= List of DRG locomotives and railbuses =

The railway vehicle classes covered by this list of DRG locomotives and railbuses belonged to the Deutsche Reichsbahn-Gesellschaft or DRG (1924–37) and its successor, the Deutsche Reichsbahn or DRB (post 1937).

The DRG (lit. German Imperial Railway Company) was formed under the terms of the Dawes Plan from the Deutsche Reichseisenbahnen (lit. Imperial Railways), a merger of the various German state railways after the First World War. The tables are generally organized in accordance with the DRG's numbering schemes for the various types of vehicles. A brief explanation of this may be found in the articles on the numbering scheme of the German railways and German steam locomotive classification.

After the end of the Second World War the West German part of the DRB became the Deutsche Bundesbahn (DB), but its East German counterpart continued to be called the Deutsche Reichsbahn (DR) – see Deutsche Reichsbahn (East Germany). The DB and the DR later introduced newly built classes into the numbering plans and also reclassified some vehicles following rebuilding. They are not covered here.

== Steam locomotives ==
The tables contain the steam locomotive classes listed in the DRG's final renumbering plan for state railway locomotives of 1925 and the classes built or rebuilt between 1925 and 1945. The locomotives taken over from private railways as well as the classes given to foreign machines immediately before and during the Second World War are covered for express passenger and passenger tender locomotives only so far.

=== Express passenger tender locomotives ===
Express passenger tender locomotives
Class	Sub-class	Origin	Type	DRG operating class	Remarks
01	01	Standard locomotive (Einheitslok)	2′C1′ h2	S 36.20	
01	01^{10}	Standard locomotive (Einheitslok)	2′C1′ h3	S 36.20	Streamlined
02	02	Standard locomotive (Einheitslok)	2′C1′ h4v	S 36.20	Rebuilt to 2′C1′ h2 class 01 from 1938 to 1942
02	02^{1}	Standard locomotive (Einheitslok)	2′C1′ h4v	S 36.18	Renumbered from class 04 in 1935
02	H 02^{10}	Experimental high pressure locomotive system Schwartzkopff-Löffler	2′C1′ h3v	S 36.20	Tested by DRG; after failed trial runs, not acquired and given back to manufacturer Schwartzkopff
03	03	Standard locomotive (Einheitslok)	2′C1′ h2	S 36.17, S 36.18	
03	03^{10}	Standard locomotive (Einheitslok)	2′C1′ h3	S 36.18	Streamlined
04		Standard locomotive (Einheitslok)	2′C1′ h4v	S 36.18	Medium pressure boiler (25 kg/cm^{2}), renumbered to class 02.1 in 1935
05		Standard locomotive (Einheitslok)	2′C2′ h3	S 37.19	Streamlined
06		Standard locomotive (Einheitslok)	2′D2′ h3	S 48.18/20	Streamlined, adjustable axle load
12	12^{0}	BBÖ 214	1′D2′ h2	S 47.17	
12	12^{1}	BBÖ 114	1′D2′ h3	S 47.17	
12	12^{2}	PKP Pu29	2′D1′ h2	S 47.18	
13	13^{0}	Prussian S 3	2′B n2v	S 24.15	
13	13^{0} (2nd)	LBE S 5^{2}	2′B n2v	S 24.16	As Prussian S 5^{2}
13	13^{0} (2nd)	PKP Pd4	2′B n2v	S 24.16	Former Prussian S 5^{2}
13	13^{1}	BBÖ 106 and PKP Pd13	2′B n2v	S 24.14	Former kkStB Class 106
13	13^{1}	BBÖ 206 and PKP Pd14	2′B n2v	S 24.14	Former kkStB Class 206
13	13^{2}	BBÖ 306	2′B h2v	S 24.14	Former kkStB Class 306
13	13^{3}	PKP Pd1	2′B n2v	S 24.15	Former Prussian S 3
13	13^{4}	PKP Pd2	2′B h2	S 24.16	Former Prussian S 4
13	13^{5}	Prussian S 4	2′B h2	S 24.16	
13	13^{5} (2nd)	PKP Pd5	2′B h2	S 24.17	Former Prussian S 6
13	13^{6–8}	Prussian S 5^{2}	2′B n2v	S 24.16	
13	13^{10–12}	Prussian S 6	2′B h2	S 24.17	
13	13^{15}	Saxon VIII V1 (1900 version)	2′B n2v	S 24.16	
13	13^{16}	Württemberg AD	2′B n2v	S 24.14	
13	13^{17}	Württemberg ADh	2′B h2	S 24.15	
13	13^{18}	Oldenburg S 3	2′B n2v	S 24.15	As Prussian S 3
13	13^{18}	Oldenburg S 5^{2}	2′B n2v	S 24.16	Modified copy of Prussian S 5^{2}
13	13^{70}	Saxon VIII 2	2′B n2	S 24.14	
13	13^{71}	Saxon VIII V1 (1896 version)	2′B n2v	S 24.15	
14	14^{0}	Prussian S 8	2′B1′ h4v	S 25.17	Former Prussian S 9, superheated and reclassified S 8 in 1913/14
14	14^{0}	Prussian S 9	2′B1′ n4v	S 25.16	
14	14^{0} (2nd)	BBÖ 308	2′B1′ n2v	S 25.14	Former kkStB 308, originally KFNB IId
14	14^{1}	Palatine P 3^{I}	2′B1′ n4v	S 25.15	
14	14^{1}	Bavarian S 2/5	2′B1 n4v	S 25.16	
14	14^{1}	Palatine P 4	2′B1′ n4v	S 25.16	
14	14^{2}	Saxon X V	2′B1′ n4v	S 25.16	
14	14^{3}	Saxon X H1	2′B1 h2	S 25.15	
15	15^{0}	Bavarian S 2/6	2′B2′ h4v	S 26.16	
15	15^{0} (2nd)	BBÖ 10	1′C1′ h4v	S 35.15	Former kkStB 10
16	16^{0}	Oldenburg S 10	1′C1′ h2	S 35.15	
16	16^{0} (2nd)	BBÖ 310 and PKP Pn12	1′C2′ h4v	S 36.14	Former kkStB Classes 310 and 310.300
16	16^{0} (2nd)	PKP Class Pn11	1′C2′ n4v, 1′C2′ h4v	S 36.14	Former 210 class; originally 1′C2′ n4v, partially superheated by PKP
17	17^{0–1}	Prussian S 10	2′C h4	S 35.17	
17	17^{0–1}	PKP Class Pk1 and LG Gr	2′C h4	S 35.17	Former Prussian S 10
17	17^{1}	LBE S 10	2′C h4	S 35.16	Lighter version of Prussian S 10 with smaller boiler
17	17^{2}	Prussian S 10^{2}	2′C h3	S 35.17	
17	17^{2}	PKP Class Pk3	2′C h3	S 35.17	Former Prussian S 10^{2}
17	17^{2}	DRG rebuild	2′C h3	S 35.18	Rebuilt from Prussian S 10^{2} in 1932, medium pressure boiler (25 kg/cm^{2})
17	H 17^{2}	DRG experimental high pressure locomotive	2′C h3v	S 35.20	Rebuilt from Prussian S 10^{2} in 1925, boiler pressure 60 kg/cm^{2}
17	17^{3}	Bavarian C V	2′C n4v	S 35.15	
17	17^{3} (2nd)	LBE S 10^{2}	2′C h3	S 35.16, S 35.17, S 35.18	Similar to Prussian S 10^{2}
17	17^{4}	Bavarian S 3/5 N	2′C h4v	S 35.15	Originally 2′C n4v, all superheated in 1924/25
17	17^{5}	Bavarian S 3/5 H	2′C h4v	S 35.16	
17	17^{6}	Saxon XII H	2′C h4	S 35.16	
17	17^{6} (2nd)	BBÖ 409	2′C h2	S 35.14	BBÖ rebuild of former kkStB 9
17	17^{7}	Saxon XII HV	2′C h4v	S 35.16, S 35.17	
17	17^{8}	Saxon XII H1	2′C h2	S 35.16	
17	17^{10–12}	Prussian S 10^{1} (1910 and 1914 version)	2′C h4v	S 35.17	
17	17^{10–12}	PKP Pk2	2′C h4v	S 35.17	Former Prussian S 10^{1} (1910 and 1914 version)
18	18^{0}	Saxon XVIII H	2′C1′ h3	S 36.17	
18	18^{1}	Württemberg C	2′C1′ h4v	S 36.16	
18	18^{2}	Baden IV f^{1–4}	2′C1′ h4v	S 36.16	
18	18^{3}	Baden IV h^{1–3}	2′C1′ h4v	S 36.17	
18	18^{4–5}	Bavarian S 3/6, Palatine S 3/6 and DRG-built S 3/6	2′C1′ h4v	S 36.16, S 36.17, S 36.18	
18	18^{6}	PKP Pm36	2′C1′ h2	S 36.17	1 unit streamlined
18	T 18^{10}	DRG experimental steam turbine locomotive	2′C1′ h	S 36.20	2 units built by Krupp and Maffei
19	19^{0}	Saxon XX HV	1′D1′ h4v	S 46.17	
19	19^{1}	PKP Pt31	1′D1′ h2	S 46.18	10 units renumbered from class 39^{10} in 1941
19	19^{10}	DRB experimental steam motor locomotive	1′Do1′ h8	S 46.18	After modification in 1943 reclassified S 46.20

=== Passenger tender locomotives ===
Passenger tender locomotives
Class	Sub-class	Origin	Type	DRG operating class	Remarks
23		Standard locomotive (Einheitslok)	1′C1′ h2	P 35.18	
24		Standard locomotive (Einheitslok)	1′C h2	P 34.15	
24		Standard locomotive (Einheitslok)	1′C h2v	P 34.15	2 units with compound engine (one originally 1′C h2, but soon converted) and medium pressure boiler (25 kg/cm^{2})
33	33^{0}	BBÖ 570	2′D h2	P 46.14	
33	33^{1}	BBÖ 113	2′D h2	P 46.15	
33	33^{2}	PKP Os 24	2′D h2	P 46.15	
34	34^{70}	BBÖ 231	C n2	P 33.14	Former kkStB Class 231, originally StEG Class IVfn
34	34^{73}	Mecklenburg P 3^{1}	1B n2	P 23.12, P 23.13	As Prussian P 3^{1}
34	34^{76}	Saxon III	1B n2	P 23.13	
34	34^{77–78}	Saxon IIIb	1′B n2	P 23.12, P 23.13	
34	34^{79}	Saxon IIIb V	1′B n2v	P 23.14	
34	34^{80}	Saxon VIb V	1′B n2v	P 23.14	
34	34^{81}	Württemberg A	1B n2	P 23.13	
34	34^{82}	Württemberg Ac	1B n2v	P 23.14	
35	35^{0}	BBÖ 110 and 110.500	1′C1′ n4v	P 35.15	Former kkStB classes 110 and 110.500
35	35^{1}	BBÖ 329 and PKP Ol11	1′C1′ n2v	P 35.14	Former kkStB Class 329
35	35^{2–4}	BBÖ 429, 429.100, 429.900, ČSD 354.7, PKP Ol12 and JDŽ 106	1′C1′ h2v, 1′C1′ h2	P 35.14	Former kkStB classes 429, 429.100, 429.900; ČSD rebuilt most of its compounds to simple expansion
35	35^{4}	ČSD 354.8	1′C1′ h2	P 35.14	Former ATE Class If
35	35^{5}	ČSD 364.0	1′C1′ h2	P 35.14	Former kkStB Class 910
35	35^{7}	PKP Ol 103	1′C1′ h2	P 35.14	Former MÁV Class 324
35	35^{8}	PKP Ol12	1′C1′ h2v, 1′C1′ h2	P 35.14	Former kkStB classes 429, 429.100, 429.900
36	36^{0–4}	Prussian P 4^{2}	2′B n2v	P 24.15	
36	36^{6}	Mecklenburg P 4^{2}	2′B n2v	P 24.14, P 24.15	As Prussian P 4^{2}
36	36^{7}	Bavarian B XI Zw	2′B n2	P 24.14	
36	36^{7–8}	Bavarian B XI Vbd	2′B n2v	P 24.15	
36	36^{8}	Bavarian P 2/4	2′B h2	P 24.15	
36	36^{9–10}	Saxon VIII V2	2′B n2v	P 24.14, P 24.15, P 24.16	
36	36^{12}	Oldenburg P 4^{1}	2′B n2	P 24.14	
36	36^{12}	Oldenburg P 4^{2}	2′B n2v	P 24.15	Modified copy of Prussian P 4^{2}
36	36^{70}	Prussian P 4^{1}	2′B n2	P 24.14	
36	36^{70} (2nd)	EWA Class IIa	2′B n2	P 24.14	
37	37^{0–1} later: 37^{0–2}	Prussian P 6	1′C h2	P 34.15	
37	37^{0–1} later: 37^{0–2}	Saar P 6, PKP Oi1, LG K 6 and LVD Bn	1′C h2	P 34.15	Former Prussian P 6
37	37^{2}	LBE P 6 and G 6	1′C h2	P 34.16	Similar to Prussian P 6; two variants with 1500 or 1400 mm drivers
37	37^{3}	ČSD 344.0	1′C h2	P 34.14	Former kkStB Class 228, originally StEG Class 39
38	38^{0}	Bavarian P 3/5 N	2′C h4v	P 35.14	Originally 2′C n4v, all superheated in 1924/25
38	38^{2–3}	Saxon XII H2 and DRG-built XII H2	2′C h2	P 35.15	
38	38^{4}	Bavarian P 3/5 H	2′C h4v	P 35.15	
38	38^{5}	JDŽ 109	2′C h2	P 35.14	Former Südbahn Class 32f
38	38^{10–40}	Prussian P 8, Mecklenburg P 8, Oldenburg P 8 and Baden P 8	2′C h2	P 35.17	
38	38^{10–40}	Saar P 8, AL P 8, PKP Ok1 and LG K 8	2′C h2	P 35.17	Former/copies of Prussian P 8
38	T 38^{10–40}	DRG experimental loco with steam turbine driven tender	2′C h2 + 1′B2′	P 35.17	Rebuilt from Prussian P 8 in 1925/26, converted back in 1937
38	38^{41}	BBÖ 209 and JDŽ 03	2′C h2	P 35.14	Former Südbahn Class 109
38	38^{42}	ČSD 354.4	2′C n2	P 35.14	Former kkStB Class 11, originally ÖNWB Class XIVa, and former BEB Class VIII
38	38^{43}	ČSD 354.4	2′C n2v	P 35.14	Former kkStB Class 11, originally ÖNWB Class XIVb
38	38^{44}	ČSD 354.4	2′C h2	P 35.14	Former BEB VIII
38	38^{45–46}	PKP Ok22	2′C h2	P 35.17	
38	38^{70}	Baden IV e^{2–6}	2′C n4v	P 35.14	
39	39^{0–2}	Prussian P 10 and DRG-built P 10	1′D1′ h3	P 46.19	
39	39^{3}	BBÖ 670	1′D1′ h2	P 46.14	BBÖ rebuild of kkStB Class 470
39	39^{4}	JDŽ 06	1′D1′ h2	P 46.18	
39	39^{10}	(PKP Pt31)	1′D1′ h2	P 46.18	Ordered by PKP, but delivered to DRB after occupation; renumbered to class 19^{1} in 1941

=== Goods tender locomotives ===
Goods tender locomotives
Class	Sub-class	Origin	Type	DRG operating class	Remarks
41		Standard locomotive (Einheitslok)	1′D1′ h2	G 46.18/20	Adjustable axle load
42		Wartime locomotive (Kriegslok)	1′E h2	G 56.17	
43		Standard locomotive (Einheitslok)	1′E h2	G 56.20	
44		Standard locomotive (Einheitslok)	1′E h3	G 56.20	Also built as 44 ÜK (Übergangskriegslok i.e. transitional wartime loco)
44		Standard locomotive (Einheitslok)	1′E h4v	G 56.20	2 units with compound engine and medium pressure boiler (25 kg/cm^{2})
45		Standard locomotive (Einheitslok)	1′E1′ h3	G 57.18/20	Adjustable axle load
50		Standard locomotive (Einheitslok)	1′E h2	G 56.15	Also built as 50 ÜK (Übergangskriegslok i.e. transitional wartime loco)
52	52	Wartime locomotive (Kriegslok)	1′E h2	G 56.15, G 56.16	169 units with condensing tender classified G 56.16
52	52^{70}	Saxon IIIb	1′B n2	G 23.13	
53	53^{0}	Prussian G4^{2}	C n2v	G 33.14	
53	53^{3}	Prussian G4^{3}	C n2v	G 33.15	
53	53^{6–7}	Saxon V V	C n2v	G 33.14, G 33.15	
53	53^{8}	Württemberg Fc	C n2v	G 33.13	
53	53^{10}	Oldenburg G 4^{2}	C n2v	G 33.13, G 33.14	As Prussian G4^{2}
53	53^{70–71}	Prussian G 3	C n2	G 33.13	
53	53^{76}	Prussian G 4^{1}	C n2	G 33.13	
53	53^{80}	Bavarian C IV Zw	C n2	G 33.13	
53	53^{80–81}	Bavarian C IV Vbd	C n2v	G 33.14	
53	53^{82}	Saxon V	C n2	G 33.13	
53	53^{83}	Württemberg F2	C n2	G 33.13	
53	53^{85}	Baden VII a^{1...17} and VII c^{1}	C n2	G 33.13	
54	54^{0}	Prussian G 5^{1}	1′C n2	G 34.13	
54	54^{2–3}	Prussian G 5^{2}	1′C n2v	G 34.14	
54	54^{6}	Prussian G 5^{3}	1′C n2	G 34.14	
54	54^{8–10}	Prussian G 5^{4} and G 5^{5}	1′C n2v, 1′C h2v	G 34.14	Originally 1′C n2v, 20 units superheated in 1925/26
54	54^{12}	Mecklenburg G 5^{4}	1′C n2v	G 34.14	As Prussian G 5^{4}
54	54^{13}	Bavarian C VI	1′C n2v	G 34.14	
54	54^{14}	Bavarian G 3/4 N	1′C n2v	G 34.14	
54	54^{15–17}	Bavarian G 3/4 H	1′C h2	G 34.16	
55	55^{0–6}	Prussian G 7^{1}	D n2v	G 44.13	
55	55^{7–13}	Prussian G 7^{2}	D n2v, D h2v	G 44.13	Originally D n2v, 2 units superheated in 1922
55	55^{16–22}	Prussian G 8	D h2	G 44.14	
55	55^{23–24}	Prussian G 9	D n2, D h2	G 44.15, Gt 44.16	Originally D n2, 35 units superheated from 1923 on and classified G 44.16
55	55^{25–56}	Prussian G 8^{1}	D n2	G 44.17	
55	55^{57}	Mecklenburg G 7^{2}	D n2v	G 44.14	Modified copy of Prussian G 7^{2}
55	55^{58}	Mecklenburg G 8^{1}	D h2	G 44.16, G 44.17	As Prussian G 8^{1}
55	55^{59}	Palatine G 5	D n2v	G 44.14	
55	55^{60}	Saxon I V	B′B n4v	G 44.15	Articulated Mallet locomotive
55	55^{62}	Oldenburg G 7^{1}	D h2v	G 44.15	Originally D n2v, all superheated from 1925 on
55	55^{72}	Palatine G 4^{I}	D n2	G 44.14	
56	56^{0}	Prussian G 7^{3}	1′D n2v	G 45.13	
56	56^{1}	Prussian G 8^{3}	1′D h3	G 45.17	
56	56^{2}	Mecklenburg G 7^{3}	1′D n2v	G 45.13	As Prussian G 7^{3}
56	56^{2–8}	DRG rebuild	1′D h2	G 45.16	Rebuilt from Prussian G 8^{1} from 1934 to 1942
56	56^{4}	Bavarian G 4/5 N	1′D n2	G 45.14	
56	56^{5}	Saxon IX V	1′D n2v	G 45.15	Klien-Lindner radial end axle
56	56^{6}	Saxon IX HV	1′D h2v	G 45.15	Klien-Lindner radial end axle
56	56^{7}	Baden VIII e^{1–5}	1′D n4v	G 45.16	
56	56^{7}	Baden VIII e^{6–8}	1′D h4v	G 45.16	
56	56^{8–11}	Bavarian G 4/5 H	1′D h4v	G 45.16	
56	56^{20–29}	Prussian G 8^{2}, Oldenburg G 8^{2} and DRG-built G 8^{2}	1′D h2	G 45.17	
57	57.0	Saxon XI V	E n2v, E h2v	G 55.14, G 55.15	Originally E n2v, 29 units superheated from 1920 on
57	57^{1}	Saxon XI H	E h2	G 55.14	
57	57^{2}	Saxon XI HV	E h2v	G 55.14, G 55.15	
57	57^{3}	Württemberg H	E h2v	G 55.15	Originally E n2v, all superheated in 1925
57	57^{4}	Württemberg Hh	E h2	G 55.15	
57	57^{5}	Bavarian G 5/5	E h4v	G 55.15, G 55.16, G 55.17	
57	57^{10–35}	Prussian G 10	E h2	G 55.15	
58	58^{0}	Prussian G 12^{1}	1′E h3	G 56.17	
58	58^{1}	Saxon XIII H (1917 version)	1′E h3	G 56.17	Modified copy of Prussian G 12^{1}
58	58^{2–3}	Baden G 12^{1–7}	1′E h3	G 56.16	As Prussian G 12
58	58^{4}	Saxon XIII H (1919 version)	1′E h3	G 56.16	As Prussian G 12
58	58^{5}	Württemberg G 12	1′E h3	G 56.16	As Prussian G 12
58	58^{10–21}	Prussian G 12	1′E h3	G 56.16	58 1001: Prussian G 12 (C.F.O.A. variant)
59	59^{0}	Württemberg K	1′F h4v	G 67.16	

=== Passenger tank locomotives ===
Passenger tank locomotives
Class	Sub-class	Origin	Type	DRG operating class	Remarks
61		Standard locomotive (Einheitslok)	2′C2′ h2t	St 37.18	Streamlined, built for the Henschel-Wegmann train (Berlin–Dresden)
61		Standard locomotive (Einheitslok)	2′C3′ h3t	St 38.18	Streamlined, built for the Henschel-Wegmann train (Berlin–Dresden)
62		Standard locomotive (Einheitslok)	2′C2′ h2t	Pt 37.20	
64		Standard locomotive (Einheitslok)	1′C1′ h2t	Pt 35.15	
70	70^{0}	Bavarian Pt 2/3	1B h2t, 1′B h2t	Pt 23.14	Approx. 50 units rebuilt to 1′B h2t with Bissel axle in 1934/37
70	70^{1}	Baden I g^{1–2} and DRG-built I g	1B h2t, 1′B h2t	Pt 23.14, Pt 23.15	Modified copy of Bavarian Pt 2/3; partially rebuilt to 1′B h2t with Bissel axle in 1934/37
70	70^{71}	Bavarian D IX	1B n2t	Pt 23.12	
71	71	Standard locomotive (Einheitslok)	1′B1′ h2t	Pt 24.15	
71	71^{0}	Prussian T 5^{1}	1′B1′ n2t	Pt 24.15	
71	71^{2}	Bavarian Pt 2/4 H	1′B1′ h2t	Pt 24.16	
71	71^{3}	Saxon IV T	1′B1′ n2t	Pt 24.15	Modified copy of Prussian T 5^{1}
71	71^{4}	Oldenburg T 5^{1}	1′B1′ n2t	Pt 24.15	Modified copy of Prussian T 5^{1}
72	72^{0}	Prussian T 5^{2}	2′B n2t	Pt 24.16	
72	72^{1}	Bavarian Pt 2/4 N	2′B n2t	Pt 24.13	
73	73^{0–1}	Palatine P 2^{II}, Bavarian D XII and Pt 2/5 N	1′B2′ n2t	Pt 25.15	
73	73^{2}	Bavarian Pt 2/5 H	1′B2′ h2t	Pt 25.16	
74	74^{0–3}	Prussian T 11	1′C n2t, 1′C h2t	Pt 34.16	Originally 1′C n2t, 20 units superheated in 1922/24
74	74^{4–13}	Prussian T 12	1′C h2t	Pt 34.17	
75	75^{0}	Württemberg T 5	1′C1′ h2t	Pt 35.15	
75	75^{1–3}	Baden VI b^{1–11}	1′C1′ n2t	Pt 35.14	
75	75^{4}	Baden VI c^{1–7}	1′C1′ h2t	Pt 35.16	
75	75^{5}	Saxon XIV HT	1′C1′ h2t	Pt 35.16	
75	75^{10–11}	Baden VI c^{8–9}	1′C1′ h2t	Pt 35.16	
76	76^{0}	Prussian T 10	2′C h2t	Pt 35.16	
77	77^{0}	Palatine P 5	1′C2′ h2t	Pt 36.16	Originally 1′C2′ n2t, all superheated in 1925
77	77^{1}	Palatine Pt 3/6 and Bavarian Pt 3/6	1′C2′ h2t	Pt 36.16	
78	78^{0–5}	Prussian T 18, Württemberg T 18 and DRG-built T 18	2′C2′ h2t	Pt 37.17	
79	79^{0}	Saxon XV HTV	CC h4v	Pt 66.15	Klien-Lindner radial end axles

=== Goods tank locomotives ===
Goods tank locomotives
Class	Sub-class	Origin	Type	DRG operating class	Remarks
80		Standard locomotive (Einheitslok)	C h2t	Gt 33.17	
81		Standard locomotive (Einheitslok)	D h2t	Gt 44.17	
84		Standard locomotive (Einheitslok)	1′E1′ h3t, 1′E1' h2t	Gt 57.18	Built for the Müglitztal line near Dresden, 2 units with Luttermöller cogwheel-linked end axles
85		Standard locomotive (Einheitslok)	1′E1′ h3t	Gt 57.20	Built for the Höllental line in the Black Forest
86		Standard locomotive (Einheitslok)	1′D1′ h2t	Gt 46.15	Also built as 86 ÜK (Übergangskriegslok, i.e. transitional wartime loco)
87		Standard locomotive (Einheitslok)	E h2t	Gt 55.17	Built for the Hamburg harbour railway, Luttermöller cogwheel-linked end axles
88	88^{71–72}	Bavarian D IV	B n2t	Gt 22.14	
88	88^{73}	Pfalz T 1	B n2t	Gt 22.14	Copy of Bavarian D IV
88	88^{74}	Württemberg T	B n2t	Gt 22.8	
88	88^{75}	Baden I b^{1–2}	B n2t	Gt 22.12	Built for pontoon bridge service across the Rhine
88	88^{75}	Baden I e^{1–6}	B n2t	Gt 22.14	
89	89^{0}	Standard locomotive (Einheitslok)	C h2t, C n2t	Gt 33.15	
89	89^{0}	Prussian T 8	C h2t	Gt 33.15	
89	89^{1}	Palatine T 3	C n2t	Gt 33.14	
89	89^{2}	Saxon V T (1895 and 1914 version)	C n2t	Gt 33.14, Gt 33.16	
89	89^{3–4}	Württemberg T 3	C n2t	Gt 33.10, Gt 33.12	
89	89^{4}	Württemberg T 3 L	C n2t	Gt 33.11	Klose drive mechanism
89	89^{6}	Bavarian D II	C n2t	Gt 33.15	
89	89^{7}	Bavarian R 3/3 (1906 version)	C n2t	Gt 33.15	
89	89^{8}	Bavarian R 3/3 (1921 version)	C n2t	Gt 33.16	
89	89^{70–75}	Prussian T 3	C n2t	Gt 33.10, Gt 33.11, Gt 33.12	
89	89^{78}	Prussian T 7	C n2t	Gt 33.14	
89	89^{80}	Mecklenburg T 3a and T 3b	C n2t	Gt 33.10, Gt 33.11	Copy of Prussian T 3
89	89^{81}	Bavarian D V	C n2t	Gt 33.15	
89	89^{82}	Saxon V T (1872, 1884 and 1895 version)	C n2t	Gt 33.14, Gt 33.15	
89	89^{83}	Baden IX a^{1}	C n2t	Gt 33.14	Former rack railway loco, cogwheels removed
90	90^{0–2}	Prussian T 9^{1}	C1′ n2t	Gt 34.14	90 116: Prussian T 9 (Elberfeld type)
91	91^{0–1}	Prussian T 9^{2}	1C n2t	G 34.14	
91	91^{3–18}	Prussian T 9^{3}	1′C n2t	Gt 34.15	
91	91^{19}	Mecklenburg T 4	1′C n2t	Gt 34.11, Gt 34.12, Gt 34.13	
91	91^{20}	Württemberg T 9	1′C n2t	Gt 34.15	Copy of Prussian T 9^{3}
92	92^{0}	Württemberg T 6	D h2t	Gt 44.15	
92	92^{1}	Württemberg T 4	D n2t	Gt 44.16	
92	92^{2–3}	Baden X b^{1–7}	D n2t	Gt 44.14, Gt 44.15	
92	92^{4}	Oldenburg T 13^{1} and Prussian T 13^{1}	D h2t	Gt 44.16	
92	92^{5–10}	Prussian T 13 and Oldenburg T 13	D n2t	Gt 44.15, Gt 44.16	
92	92^{20}	Palatine R 4/4 and Bavarian R 4/4	D n2t	Gt 44.16, Gt 44.17	
92	92^{21}	BBÖ 578, PKP Class TKp101	D n2t	Gt 44.16, Gt 44.17	
92	92^{22-23}	BBÖ 178, PKP Class TKp11, ČSD Class 422.0, JDŽ 52	D n2t	Gt 44.16, Gt 44.17	
92	92^{24}	LAG Nr. 65 to 77	D n2t		
92	92^{25}	BBÖ 478			
92	92^{26}	PKP Class TKp30			
92	92^{27}	PH G, PH G'			
92	92^{28}	PKP Class TKp12			
92	92^{29}	GörlK Nos. 181 to 183			
92	92^{33}	Stettin Harbour Railway No. IX			
93	93^{0–4}	Prussian T 14	1′D1′ h2t	Gt 46.16	
93	93^{5–12}	Prussian T 14^{1} and Württemberg T 14	1′D1′ h2t	Gt 46.17	
94	94^{0}	Palatine T 5	E n2t	Gt 55.14	
94	94^{1}	Württemberg Tn	E h2t	Gt 55.13	
94	94^{2–4}	Prussian T 16	E h2t	Gt 55.15	
94	94^{5–17}	Prussian T 16^{1}	E h2t	Gt 55.17	
94	94^{19}	Saxon XI HT (1910 version)	E h2t	Gt 55.15	
94	94^{20–21}	Saxon XI HT (1908 version)	E h2t	Gt 55.16	
95	95^{0}	Prussian T 20	1′E1′ h2t	Gt 57.19	
96	96^{0}	Bavarian Gt 2 × 4/4	D′D h4vt	Gt 88.15, Gt 88.16	Articulated Mallet locomotive

=== Rack railway locomotives ===
Rack railway locomotives
Class	Sub-class	Origin	Type	DRG operating class	Remarks
97	97^{0}	Prussian T 26	C1′ n2(4)t	Z 34.14	
97	97^{1}	Bavarian PtzL 3/4	C1′ h2(4v)t	Z 34.15	
97	97^{2}	Baden IX b^{1–2}	C1′ n2(4v)t	Z 34.14	
97	97^{3}	Württemberg Fz	1′C n2(4v)t	Z 34.14	
97	97^{4}	Prussian T 28	1′D1′ h2(4v)t	Z 46.16	
97	97^{5}	DRG new build (Württemberg Hz)	E h2(4v)t	Z 55.15	

=== Branch line locomotives ===
Branch line locomotives
Class	Sub-class	Origin	Type	DRG sub-class	Remarks
98	98^{0}	Saxon I TV	B′B′ n4vt	L 44.15	Articulated Meyer locomotive
98	98^{1}	Oldenburg T 2	B n2t	L 22.14	Copy of Prussian T 2
98	98^{2}	Oldenburg T 3	C n2t	L 33.11	Copy of Prussian T 3
98	98^{3}	Bavarian PtL 2/2	B h2t	L 22.11	
98	98^{4–5}	Palatine T 4^{II}, Bavarian D XI and PtL 3/4	C1′ n2t	L 34.10, L 34.11	
98	98^{6}	Palatine T 4^{I}, Bavarian D VIII and Palatine D VIII	C1′ n2t	L 34.12, L 34.13	
98	98^{7}	Bavarian BB II	B′B n4vt	L 44.11	Articulated Mallet locomotive
98	98^{8–9}	Bavarian GtL 4/4	D h2t	L 44.11, L 44.12	
98	98^{10}	DRG new build (Bavarian GtL 4/5)	D1′ h2t	L 45.11	
98	98^{11}	DRG rebuild (Bavarian GtL 4/5)	1′D h2t	L 45.11	Rebuilt from Bavarian GtL 4/4 in 1934/41
98	98^{70}	Saxon VII TS	B n2t	L 22.10	
98	98^{70}	Saxon VII T	B n2t	L 22.11, L 22.13, L 22.14	
98	98^{71}	Saxon VII	B n2	L 22.14	
98	98^{72}	Saxon IIIb T	B1′ n2t	L 23.14, L 23.15	
98	98^{73}	Saxon II	1B n2	L 23.13	
98	98^{74}	Oldenburg T 1^{2}	B n2t	L 22.10	
98	98^{75}	Bavarian D VI	B n2t	L 22.9	
98	98^{76}	Bavarian D VII and PtL 3/3	C n2t	L 33.9	
98	98^{77}	Bavarian D X	C1′ n2t	L 34.11	

=== Narrow gauge locomotives ===
Narrow gauge locomotives
Class	Sub-class	Origin	Type	DRG operating class	Remarks
99	1,000 mm gauge				
99	99^{00}	Palatine L 2	B n2t	K 22.8	
99	99^{01}	Palatine Pts 2/2	B h2t	K 22.7	
99	99^{02}	Oldenburg "B"	B n2t	K 22.5, K 22.6	
99	99^{03–06}	Prussian T 33	C n2t	K 33.9, K 33.10	
99	99^{07}	Bavarian LE	C n2t	K 33.6	
99	99^{08–09}	Palatine L 1 and Pts 3/3 N	C n2t	K 33.8	
99	99^{10}	Palatine Pts 3/3 H	C h2t	K 33.8	
99	99^{12}	Württemberg Ts 3	C n2t	K 33.9	
99	99^{13}	Bavarian Pts 3/4	1′C h2t	K 34.8	
99	99^{15}	Bavarian Gts 4/4	D n2t	K 44.7	
99	99^{16}	Saxon I M	B′B′ n4v	K 44.10	Articulated Fairlie locomotive
99	99^{17}	Württemberg Ts 4	D n2t	K 44.8	Klose drive mechanism
99	99^{18}	Prussian T 40	E h2t	K 55.8	Luttermöller cogwheel-linked outer axles
99	99^{19}	DRG new build (Württemberg Ts 5)	E h2t	K 55.9	
99	99^{20}	Bavarian Gts 2 × 3/3	C′C h4v	K 66.9	Articulated Mallet locomotive
99	99^{21}	DRG new build	C n2t	K 33.6	
99	99^{22}	Standard locomotive (Einheitslok)	1′E1′ h2t	K 57.10	
99	99^{710}	Prussian T 31	C n2t	K 33.7	
99	99^{720}	Baden "C"	C n2t	K 33.8	
99	900 mm gauge				
99	99^{30}	Mecklenburg T 7	C n2t	K 33.6	
99	99^{31}	Mecklenburg T 42	D n2t	K 44.8	
99	99^{32}	DRG-new build	1′D1′ h2t	K 46.8	Built with parts from the standard locomotive (Einheitslok) programme
99	785 mm gauge				
99	99^{40}	Prussian T 37	D n2t	K 44.7	
99	99^{41–42}	Prussian T 38	D h2t	K 44.8	
99	99^{43–44}	Prussian T 39	E h2t	K 55.8, K 55.9	Luttermöller cogwheel-linked outer axles
99	750 mm gauge				
99	99^{50}	Württemberg Tss 3	C n2t	K 33.7	Klose drive mechanism
99	99^{51–60}	Saxon IV K	B′B′ n4vt	K 44.7, K 44.8	Articulated Meyer locomotive
99	99^{61}	Saxon V K	D n2vt	K 44.7	Klien-Lindner radial outer axles
99	99^{62}	Württemberg Tss 4	D n2t	K 44.7	Klose drive mechanism
99	99^{63}	Württemberg Tssd	B′B n4vt	K 44.7	Articulated Mallet locomotive
99	99^{64–71}	Saxon VI K	E h2t	K 55.8, K 55.9	
99	99^{73–76}	Standard locomotive (Einheitslok)	1′E1′ h2t	K 57.9	
99	99^{750–752}	Saxon I K	C n2t	K 33.6	
99	99^{754}	Saxon III K	C1′ n2t	K 34.7	Klose drive mechanism

== Electric locomotives ==
Class	Origin	UIC classification	Remarks
E 00 02	Prussian ES 2	2′B1′	
E 01 09 to E 01 19	Prussian ES 9 to ES 19	1′C1′	
E 04		1′Co1′	
E 05		1′Co1′	
E 06		2′C2′	Originally classified as ES 51 to ES 57
E 15		(1′Bo)(Bo1′)	Trial locomotive, Tatz drive
E 16		1′Do1′	Originally classified as ES 1, Buchli drive
E 16.5		1′Do1′	Trial locomotive, Tatz drive
E 17		1′Do1′	
E 18		1′Do1′	
E 19.0		1′Do1′	
E 19.1		1′Do1′	
E 21		2′Do1′	
E 21.5		2′Do1′	
E 30	Prussian EP 202 to EP 208	1′C1′	
E 32		1′C1′	Originally classified as EP 2
E 36	Bavarian EP 3/6^{II} and EP 3	1′C2′	
E 36^{2}	Bavarian EP 3/6^{II} and EP 4	1′C2′	
E 42^{1}		B′B′	Originally classified as EP 213 and EP 214
E 42^{2}		B′B′	Originally classified as EP 215 to EP 219
E 44		Bo′Bo′	
E 44.5		Bo′Bo′	
E 49	Prussian EP 209/210 and EP 211/212	2′B+B1′	
E 50 35	Prussian EP 235	2′D1′	
E 50 36 to E 50 46	Prussian EP 236 to EP 246	2′D1′	Classified as E 50^{3}
E 50 47 to E 50 52	Prussian EP 247 to EP 252	2′D1′	Classified as E 50^{4}
E 52		2′BB2′	Originally classified as EP 5
E 60		C1′	
E 61.0 und E 61.1	Baden A^{2}	1′C1′	
E 61.2	Baden A^{3}	1′C1′	
E 61 (Zweitb.)	BBÖ 1070	D	
E 62	Bavarian EP 3/5 and EP 1	1′C1′ w1k	
E 63		C	
E 69	Lokalbahn AG 1 to 5	Bo	
E 70 02 to E 70 08	Prussian EG 502 to EG 505, Prussian EG 506, Prussian EG 507 and EG 508	D	
E 70 21 and E 70 22	Bavarian EG 2x2/2	B′B′	
E 71.1	Prussian EG 511 to EG 537	B′B′	
E 73 01 and E 73 02	Bavarian EG 4x1/1	Bo′Bo′	
E 73 03	Prussian EV 1/2	Bo+Bo	Also designated as E 73^{1}
E 73 05	Altona harbour railway EV 5	Bo′Bo′	also classified as E 73^{2}
E 73 06	Altona harbour railway EV 6	Bo′Bo′	also classified as E 73^{3}
E 75		1′BB1′	
E 77		(1B)(B1), later (1′B)(B1′)	Originally classified as EG 701 to EG 725 (Prussian version) and EG 3 (Bavarian version)
E 79	Bavarian EG 4	1′D2′	Originally classified as EG 4
E 80		(A1A)(A1A)	
E 88^{0}	BBÖ 1080	(A1A)(A1A)	
E 88^{1}	BBÖ 1080.1	(A1A)(A1A)	
E 88^{2}	BBÖ 1280	(A1A)(A1A)	
E 88^{3}	BBÖ 1082	(A1A)(A1A)	
E 89^{0}	BBÖ 1100	(1′C)(C1′)	
E 89^{1}	BBÖ 1100.1	(1′C)(C1′)	
E 90^{5}	Prussian EG 551/552 to EG 569/570	C+C	
E 91		C′C′	E 91 01 to E 91 16 (formerly classified as EG 5) and E 91 81 to E 91 94 (formerly classified as EG 581 to EG 594)
E 91^{3}	Prussian EG 538abc to EG 549abc	B+B+B	
E 91^{9}		C′C′	E 91 95 to E 91 106
E 92	Prussian EG 571ab to EG 579ab	Co+Co	
E 93		Co′Co′	
E 94		Co′Co′	
E 95		1′Co + Co1′	
E 99	NÖLB E	C′C′	
E 170			
E 171	ÖBB 1085		
E 172	ÖBB 1478		
E 173	ÖBB 1479		
E 174	kkStB 1083, ČSD E 200.0		
E 176			
E 178		1 Bo+Bo 1	DC locomotive for the north–south tunnel in Berlin with conductor rail, 1 built
E 244		Bo′Bo′	

== Diesel locomotives ==
Class		UIC classification	Year of manufacture	Remarks
to 1930	from 1930	UIC classification	Year of manufacture	Remarks
V 3001	-	1B1′	1926	
V 3201	V 120 001	2′C2′	1929	
V 3601	-	1′B	1924	
V 3602	-	B 1	1924	
V 3801	-	C 1′	1927	
-	V 12 901	Bo	1930	BBÖ 2021/s
-	V 15 001	Bo	1936	BBÖ 2000
-	V 15 901	Bo	1934–1936	BBÖ 2040/s
V 6001 - V 6003	V 16 001 to V 16 003	B	1924	test locomotive
-	V 16 004	Co	1933	test locomotive
-	V 20 001	A1A	1927	BBÖ 2020
-	V 20 901	Bo′Bo′	1930	BBÖ 2070/s
-	V 140 001	1′C1′	1935	first running number DRG V 16 101
V 6016 + V 6017	Kö 0001 - 0002	B	1930–1937	
-	Kö 0003 - 0291	B	1930–1937	also Kb
V 6004 - V 6015; A 6000 - A 6003	Kö 4000 - 5346	B	1930–1942	also Kb, Kbs, Köe, Kbe, Ks, Köf, Kbf

== Electric railbuses ==
Designation		UIC classification	Year of manufacture	Remarks
to 1940	from 1940	UIC classification	Year of manufacture	Remarks
1900–1902	ET 11	Bo′2′+2′Bo′	1936–1937	
1801–1807, 1815–1827, 1832–1838, 1849, 2401–2405, 2423–2426, 2441–2444	ET 25	Bo′2′+2′2′+2′Bo′	1935–1937	
1808–1814, 1828–1831, 2406–2422, 2427–2440, 2445–2448	ET 25.1	Bo′2′+2′2′+2′Bo′	1935–1936	
1301–1313	ET 31	Bo′2′+Bo′2′+2′Bo′	1936–1937	
1061–1066, 2061–2063, 2981–2986	ET 41	(1A)(A1)+2+2′2′	1927–1928	
1421–1422	ET 42	Bo′2′	1936	BBÖ ET 11.0
1701–1704, 2355–2358, 2501–2504	ET 51	Bo′Bo′	1934	
1705–1708, 2351–2354	ET 51.1	Bo′Bo′	1939	
1731–1734, 2449–2456	ET 55	Bo′2′+2′2′+2′Bo′	1939–1942	
1201–1225, 2201–2224, 2650–2693	ET 65	Bo′Bo′+2′2′+2′2′	1933–1938	
1031+1032, 2991+2992	ET 82	(1A)2′+2	1926	
1401–1408, 2071–2072	ET 83	(A1A)3′/Bo′2'+2′2′	1929–1930	BBÖ ET 10
1101–1136, 2801–2870, 2101–2134	ET 85	Bo′2'+2′2′	1924–1932	
1001–1006, 2001–2006, 2011–2016	ET 87	2′1+B′1+1 2′	1914	Prussian 501 Breslau to 506 Breslau
1007–1010, 2017–2019, 2901–2915	ET 88	(A1)(1A)	1923	507 Breslau to 510 Breslau
1011–1021, 2021–2028, 2916–2955	ET 89	(1A)(A1)+2+2′2′	1926	"Rübezahl"
1998+1999	ET 91	Bo′2′	1935	Observation car
1451+1452	ET 94	Bo′Bo′	1936	Goods railbus BBÖ ET 30
1501–1560	(ET 99 061–070)	Bo′1+1(1A)	1905–1907	Prussian 551/552 Altona to 669/670 Altona, Hamburg-Altona city and suburban railway, renumbering not achieved
1561–1575		Bo′ 1 + 1 2′	1909	Prussian 671/672 Altona to 719/720 Altona, Hamburg-Altona city and suburban railway
1576–1588		Bo′ 1 + 1 2′	1910–1913	Hamburg-Altona city and suburban railway,
1589–1645	(ET 99 001–52)	Bo′2′2′	1924–1933	Hamburg-Altona city and suburban railway, renumbering not achieved
3001–3022, 6001–6030	Test Trains A to F	Bo′2′+2+2+2+2′Bo′	1922–1924	S-Bahn Berlin
4501–4518, 8501–8518	ET 125	Bo′Bo′+2′2′	1934–1938	S-Bahn Berlin
3107...3795, 5056...6320	ET 165	Bo′Bo′+2′2′	1928–1932	S-Bahn Berlin
3800–3833, 6310...6344	ET 166	Bo′Bo′+2′2′	1936	S-Bahn Berlin, Olympia version
3834–4044, 6346...6555	ET 167	Bo′Bo′+2′2′	1938	S-Bahn Berlin
3065...3099, 5001...5050	ET 168	Bo′Bo′+2′2′	1926	S-Bahn Berlin
3023...3056, 6033–6078	ET 169	Bo′2′+2+2+2+2′Bo′	1925	S-Bahn Berlin
1501–1547	ET 171	Bo′Bo′+2′2′+Bo′Bo′	1939–1943	S-Bahn Hamburg
	ET 183	(1A)(A1)	1899	LAG Nos. 501 to 505
1481–1489	ET 184.0	Bo	1908	Bavarian MBCL
	ET 184.4	Bo	1895–1909	LAG Nos. 360 and 361
	ET 185	(1A)(A1)	1906	LAG Nr. 772
	ET 186.0	A1A	1896	LAG Nos. 761 and 762
	ET 186.1	A1A	1891	LAG Nos. 181 and 182
1430–1432	ET 187.0	Bo	1912	ČSD M 201
1433	ET 187.1	Bo	1924	ČSD M 201.004
1471–1473	ET 187.2	Bo	1913	BBÖ ET 24
601	ET 194.0	Bo	1908	Bavarian MBCL
	ET 194.1	Bo	1889	LAG No. 895
	ET 194.2	Bo	1912	LAG No. 891
	ET 196.0	(A1)(1A)	1908–1910	LAG No. 801 to 804
	ET 197.0	Bo	1914	LAG No. 875
1M und 2M	ET 197.2	Bo	1917	Saxon I MET
	ET 198.0	Bo	1903	SB Tw 20 and 21 of the Mödling–Hinterbrühl branch line
	ET 199.0	Bo′Bo′	1928	TVL Nos. 30 and 31

== Accumulator railbuses ==
Class	Origin	UIC classification	Remarks
201 to 205	Prussian A 1	A1A	
206	Pfalz C 3	A1A	
207 to 210	Pfalz C 4	Bo′2′	
223/224 to 233/234	Prussian A 2	2A+A2	Wittfeld type
241/242 to 353/354	Prussian A 2	2A+A2	Wittfeld type
355/356 to 489/490	Prussian A 3	2A+A2	Wittfeld type
491/492 to 531/532	Prussian A 4	2A+A2	Wittfeld type
533/534 and 535/536	Prussian A 5	3+Bo+3	Wittfeld type
537/538 to 545/546	Prussian A 4	2A+A2	Wittfeld type
547/548 to 553/554	Prussian A 6	3+Bo+3	Wittfeld type
555/556 to 563/564	Prussian A 4	2A+A2	Wittfeld type
565/566 and 567/568	Prussian A 6	3+Bo+3	Wittfeld type
569/570 to 577/578	Prussian AT 569 - 578	1A+1A+A1	
579 and 580	Prussian A 4	2A+A2	Wittfeld type
581/582 to 615/616		2A+A2	Reichsbahn type

== Steam railbuses ==
Class	Origin	UIC classification	Remarks
1 to 8	Baden 121a	A 1 h2	Kittel type
9 to 14	Württemberg DW	A 1 h2	Kittel type
15 and 16	Standard type	A 1 h2v	Doble System
17	BBÖ DT 2.01; EWA DT 101	B′2′ h3	
51 to 53	Standard type	Bo′2′ h4v	Doble System
54 to 58	Standard type	Bo′2′ h4v	Doble System
59	Standard type	2′Bo′ h4v	Doble System
63	LBE No. 2000	Bo′2′ h4v	Doble System

== Motor railbuses ==
Designation	UIC classification	Remarks
701 - 704	A 1	
705 - 708	1 A	
709 - 712	A 1	
713/714 + 715/716	A 1 + 1 A	
717 - 722	A 1	1933 reclassified into 133 000 to 133 005
717 ^{II}	A 1	BBÖ VT 10
718 ^{II} and 719 ^{II}	1 A	BBÖ VT 11
720 ^{II}	B	BBÖ VT 23
721 ^{II}	A 1	BBÖ VT 30
722 ^{II}	1 A	BBÖ VT 31
723	Bo	BBÖ VT 40
724 - 727	1 A	BBÖ VT 60
728	1 A	BBÖ VT 160
729	A 1	BBÖ VT 61
730 - 734	Bo	BBÖ VT 160
749 + 750	(1 A)(A 1)	MFWE T I and T II
751 - 754	(1 A)′(A 1)′	DB 85.903, StMB T 58
755 –766	(1 A)′(A 1)′	
767 - 769	1 A	BBÖ VT 12
770	1 A	BBÖ VT 20
771	A 1	BBÖ VT 21
772	Bo	BBÖ VT 22
773	B′ 2′	BBÖ VT 50
801 - 806	A 1	
805 ^{II} - 806 ^{II}	A 1	
807 - 811	Bo	
812/813 - 818/819	A 1 + 1 A	
820	A 1	
821 + 822	Bo	LBE VT 11 and VT 12
823 - 832	Bo	BBÖ VT 70
833 - 835	Bo	LEG T 1 - T 3
851 - 862	B′2′	
862 ^{II} - 864	B′2′	
865	Bo′2′	Bavarian MCCi
866 - 871	B′2′	
872 - 874	2′Bo′	
875 - 876	B′2′	
877 a/b	2′Bo2′	"Flying Hamburger"
880 - 889	2′Bo′	BBÖ VT 41
890 - 903	(1 A)(A 1)	BBÖ VT 42
904	(1 A)A′	BBÖ VT 43
905 - 930	B′ 2′	BBÖ VT 44
931 - 934	(1 A)(A 1)	BBÖ VT 63
10 001 - 003	B′2′	Goods railbus
10 004 + 005	B′2′	Goods railbus
133 000 - 005	A 1	
133 006 - 008	B	
133 009 - 012	A 1	Wismar Railbus, Hanover version
135 000 + 001	A 1	
135 002 - 011	A 1	
135 012 - 021	A 1	
135 022 - 045	A 1	
135 046 - 050	A 1	
135 051 - 059	A 1	
135 060	A 1	
135 061 - 076	1 A	
135 077 to 080	A 1	Wismar Railbus, Hanover version
135 083 - 132	1 A	
136 001 - 003	1 A	ČSD Class M 11.0
136 026 - 038	1 A	ČSD Class M 120.3
136 051 - 065	1 A	ČSD Class M 130.2
136 071 - 115	1 A	ČSD Class M 120.4
136 151 - 165	1 A	ČSD Class M 122.0
136 201 - 215	Bo	ČSD Class M 242.0
136 251 - 262	Bo	ČSD Class M 232.2
136 300 + 301	2′A	ČSD Class M 120.5
136 400 - 407	2′Bo	ČSD Class M 275.0
136 410 - 412	(1 A)(A 1)	ČSD Class M 220.1
136 420 - 422	(1 A)(A 1)	ČSD Class M 220.3
136 430 + 431	(1 A)(A 1)	ČSD Class M 221.2
136 500 - 506	(1 A)(A 1); 2′ Bo	Former PKP railbus
136 600	2′(1 A)+(A 1)2′	Former Latvian railbus no. 903
136 701	1 A 1	PH 01
136 751 + 752	B′B′	CVE VT 1 and VT 2
136 753 - 757	Bo′2′	CVE VT 3 to VT 7
136 758	B′B′	CVE VT 8
137 000 to 024	B′2′	
137 025 to 027	2′Bo′	Fast railbus (Eiltriebwagen)
137 028 to 035	2′Bo′	Fast railbus (Eiltriebwagen)
137 036 to 054	B′2′	
137 055 to 057	2′Bo′	Fast railbus (Eiltriebwagen)
137 058 to 110	2′Bo′	Fast railbus (Eiltriebwagen)
137 111 to 120	2′Bo′	Fast railbus (Eiltriebwagen)
137 121 to 135	B′2′	
137 136 to 148	B′2′	
137 149 to 152	2′Bo′2′	Hamburg version
137 153 and 154	B′2′2′B′	Leipzig version
137 155	(1 A) 2′ 2′ (A 1)	Kruckenberg version
137 156 to 159	2′Bo′	Fast railbus (Eiltriebwagen)
137 160 and 161	B′2′	Fast railbus (Eiltriebwagen)
137 162 and 163	B′2′	Fast railbus (Eiltriebwagen)
137 164 to 223	2′Bo′	Fast railbus (Eiltriebwagen)
137 224 to 232	2′Bo′2′	Hamburg version
137 233 to 234	2′Bo′Bo′2′	Leipzig version
137 235	B′2′	Fast railbus (Eiltriebwagen)
137 236	B′2′	Fast railbus (Eiltriebwagen)
137 237	(1 A)(A 1)	Former BLE railbus
137 238	A1A+2′2′	Former BLE railbus
137 239	Bo′1	Former KrOE railbus
137 240	(A 1)(1 A)	Observation car
137 241 to 270	B′2′	
137 271 and 272	B′2′	Fast railbus (Eiltriebwagen)
137 273 to 278	2′Bo′+2′2′+Bo′2′	Köln version
137 283 to 287	B′2′2′B′	Ruhr version, triple-unit
137 288 to 295	2′Bo′2′	Ruhr version, two-unit
137 296 to 300	2′Bo′	
137 322 to 325	B′2′	Narrow gauge railbus (750 mm)
137 326 to 331	(A 1)2′+2′(1 A)	Stettin version
137 332 to 343	1′Bo1′	BBÖ 2041/s
137 347 to 366	(A 1)2′	
137 367 to 376	(A 1)2′+2′(1 A)	Stettin version
137 377 to 396	(A 1)2′	
137 442 to 461	B′2′	
137 462 to 463	(A 1)(1 A)	Observation car
137 851 to 858	2′Bo′+2′2′+Bo2′	Köln version
137 901 to 903	2′Bo′+2′2′+2′2′+Bo2′	Berlin version

== See also ==
- Deutsche Reichsbahn
- Deutsche Reichsbahn-Gesellschaft
- UIC classification
