= Class 37 =

Class 37 or 37 class may refer to:

- British Rail Class 37, a British diesel locomotive
- BHP Newcastle 37 class, a class of Australian diesel locomotives
- LT&SR 37 Class, a class of British tank locomotives
- DRG Class 37, a class of German steam locomotives operated by the Deutsche Reichsbahn
