= Palatine T 3 =

Goods train locomotives

T 3 (Pfalz) DRG Class 89.1
Type and origin
- Power type: Steam
- Builder: Maffei
- Build date: 1889–1902
- Total produced: 27
Specifications
- Configuration
  - Whyte: 0-6-0T
  - UIC: C n2t
  - German: Gt 33.14
- Gauge: 1,435 mm (4 ft 8 1/2 in)
- Driver dia.: 1,245 mm (4 ft 1 in)
- Wheelbase: 3,475 mm (11 ft 4 3/4 in)
- Length
  - Over buffers: 8,900 or 9,085 mm (29 ft 2 1/2 in or 29 ft 9 3/4 in)
- Axle load: 14.0 tonnes (13.8 long tons; 15.4 short tons)
- Adhesive weight: 42.0 tonnes (41.3 long tons; 46.3 short tons)
- Service weight: 42.0 tonnes (41.3 long tons; 46.3 short tons)
- Fuel type: Coal
- Fuel capacity: 1.0 tonne (0.98 long tons; 1.1 short tons)
- Water cap.: 4.0 m^{3} (880 imp gal; 1,060 US gal)
- Firebox
  - Grate area: 1.53 m^{2} (16.5 sq ft)
- Boiler
  - Tube plates: 3,350 mm (11 ft 0 in)
  - Small tubes: 47.5 mm (1 7/8 in), 186 off
- Boiler pressure: 12 bar (12.2 kgf/cm^{2}; 174 psi)
- Heating surface
  - Firebox: 6.3 m^{2} (68 sq ft)
  - Tubes and flues: 83.3 m^{2} (897 sq ft)
  - Total surface: 89.60 m^{2} (964.4 sq ft)
- Cylinders: 2
- Cylinder size: 420 mm × 610 mm (16 9/16 in × 24 in)
Performance figures
- Maximum speed: 45 km/h (28 mph)
- Indicated power: 400 PS (294 kW; 395 hp)
Career
- Numbers: Pfalz: 13...285; DRG 89 101 – 89 121
- Retired: 1953

The Palatine T 3 was a class of goods train tank locomotives with a C n2t wheel arrangement in service with the Palatinate Railway. They had no running axles. They were incorporated into the Deutsche Reichsbahn as DRG Class 89^{1} with operating numbers 89 101–121. Their design was based on that of the Bavarian D V.

== History ==
Compared to other railway companies, the Palatinate Railway only procured C couplers for service on branch lines and shunting from 1889 to 1905. In Bavaria locomotives of Class C V had been in operation for 10 years.

== Procurement ==
Over a total of 16 years, the firm of Maffei acquired a total of 27 engines in four batches. The first four machines - procured in 1889/1990 - were bought as replacements for engines that had been decommissioned and they were given their numbers. The next procurement series from 1898 for seven engines and the batch ordered from 1900 for eleven engines received new, sequential numbers. In the 1902 batch of a further four locomotives, there was another re-used of previous operating numbers. In 1905 another engine with a new, consecutive number was delivered.

All the engine were given names as well as operating numbers as was usual with the Palatinate Railways at that time.

== Fate ==
Twenty one units were taken over by the Deutsche Reichsbahn, who renamed them the Class 89.1 in their numbering scheme. In 1920, six locomotives - numbers 207, 208, 246, 252, 255 and 285 - had to be handed over to the Saarland Railways.

In a list of locomotives in the French occupation zone from 1948, eight engines are allotted to the EAW Kaiserslautern. The last unit was retired in 1953 from the Deutsche Bundesbahn.

== Locomotive numbers ==
Details of the individual engines and their numbering are as follows:

Built				Numbers by epoch				Additional information	
Lfd. Nr.	Builder	Year of manufacture	Works number	Pal. Rly / R. Bav. St. Rly		DRG op. no.		Retired	
				Rly No.	Name	(initial)	(final)		
1	Maffei	1889	1503	70	OHRENBERG	89 107	89 101	< 1931	
2	Maffei	1889	1504	71	REHBERG	89 108	89 102	< 1931	
3	Maffei	1890	1541	13	HOMBURG	89 101	89 103	< 1931	
4	Maffei	1890	1542	71	ZWEYBRUECKEN	89 102	89 104	27.8.1947	
5	Maffei	1898	1906	202	EINOED	89 109	89 105	27.8.1947	
6	Maffei	1898	1907	203	WUERZBACH	89 110	89 106	< 1935	
7	Maffei	1898	1908	204	HASSEL	89 111	89 107	11.4.1947	
8	Maffei	1898	1909	205	BIERBACH	89 112	89 108	< 1933	
9	Maffei	1898	1910	206	ALTSTADT	89 113	89 109	11.4.1952	
10	Maffei	1898	1911	207	CONTWIG			< 1930	Transferred to Saar Rly in 1920, new op. no. 6101,
11	Maffei	1898	1912	208	DELLFELD			< 1932	Transferred to Saar Rly in 1920, new op. no. 6102,
12	Maffei	1900	2085	246	BAYRFELD			< 1928	Transferred to Saar Rly in 1920, new op. no. 6103,
13	Maffei	1900	2086	247	BIEBERMUEHLE	89 114	89 110	27.8.1947	
14	Maffei	1900	2087	248	BLICKWEILER	89 115	89 111	< 6/1953	
15	Maffei	1900	2088	249	BOEHL	89 116	89 112	Wartime casualty	
16	Maffei	1900	2089	250	EISENBERG	89 117	89 113	Wartime casualty	
17	Maffei	1900	2090	251	HOCHSTADT	89 118	89 114	Wartime casualty	
18	Maffei	1900	2091	252	LANGMEIL			< 1929	Transferred to Saar Rly in 1920, new op. no. 6104
19	Maffei	1900	2092	253	TIEFENTHAL	89 119	89 115	14.11.1952	
20	Maffei	1900	2093	254	RAMMELSBACH	89 120	89 116	1.11.1946	
21	Maffei	1900	2094	255	RAMSTEIN			< 1931	Transferred to Saar Rly in 1920, new op. no. 6105
22	Maffei	1900	2095	256	RODALBEN	89 121	89 117	< 11/1953	
23	Maffei	1902	2247	57	WACHENHEIM	89 103	89 118	1.6.1953	
24	Maffei	1902	2248	59	WEIDENTHAL	89 104	89 119	9.11.1953	
25	Maffei	1902	2249	64	FORST	89 105	89 120	1.6.1953	
26	Maffei	1902	2250	66	POTZBERG	89 106	89 121	9.11.1953	
27	Maffei	1905	2389	285	WALDFISCHBACH			< 1930	Transferred to Saar Rly in 1920, new op. no. 6106

== Literature ==
- Mühl, Albert (1982). Die Pfalzbahn: Geschichte, Betrieb und Fahrzeuge der pfälzischen Eisenbahnen. Theiss. 252 pp.
- Lothar Spielhoff (2011), Lokomotiven der Pfälzischen Eisenbahn (in German), Germering: Jürgen Pepke, ISBN 978-3-940798-15-2
- Schnabel, Heinz (1987). Eisenbahn-Fahrzeug-Archiv Band 2.5: Lokomotiven bayerischer Eisenbahnen (in German). Düsseldorf: Alba Publikation Alf Teloeken GmbH + Co KG. pp. 289–291, 388. ISBN 3-87094-105-7.
- Heinz Schnabel: Deutsches Lok-Archiv: Lokomotiven bayrischer Eisenbahnen. transpress, Berlin 1992, ISBN 3-344-70717-5
