= DRG Class E 91 =

Three different types of German electric goods train locomotive belonged to the Deutsche Reichsbahn's DRG Class E 91. In addition to the standard locomotives (Einheitslokomotive) described below there was also a Prussian class that was given the designation E 91^{3} in 1927.

== E 91.0 and E 91.8 ==
DRG Class E 91 DB Class 191
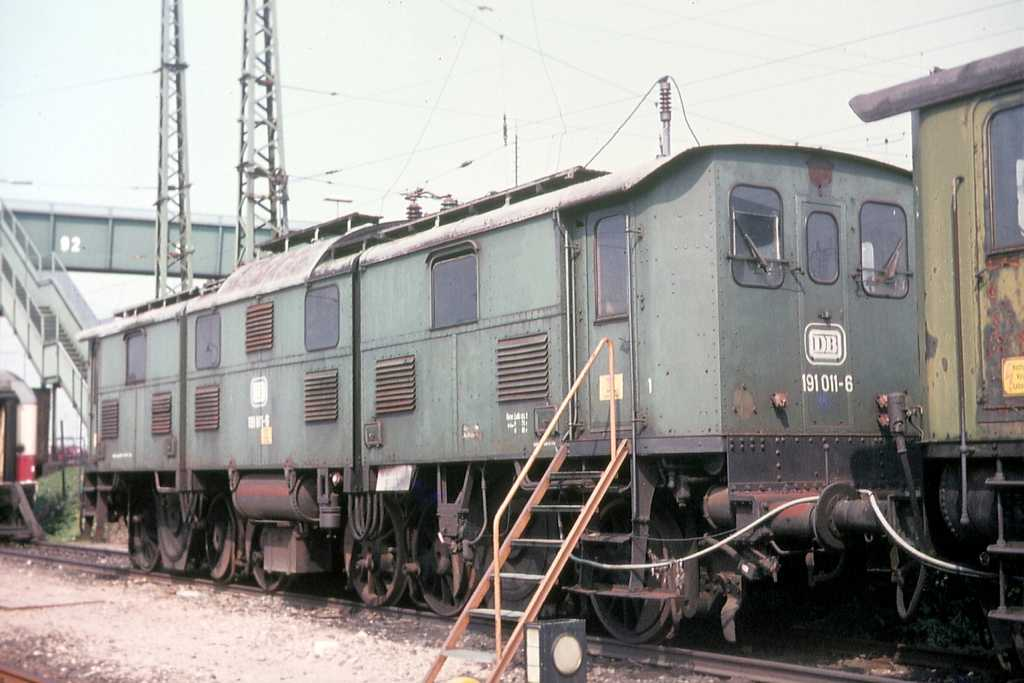
- E 99.0, retired and downgraded to a stationary engine in 1983.
Type and origin
- Builder: Krauss, WASSEG
- Build date: 1925–1927
- Total produced: 34
Specifications
- Configuration
  - UIC: C+C
- Gauge: 1,435 mm (4 ft 8 1/2 in)
- Driver dia.: 1,250 mm (49.21 in)
- Length
  - Over beams: 16,700 mm (54 ft 9.5 in)
- Axle load: 20.7 t (20.4 long tons; 22.8 short tons)
- Service weight: 123.7 t (121.7 long tons; 136.4 short tons)
- Electric system/s: 15 kV 16.7 Hz AC Catenary
- Current pickup(s): Pantograph
- Traction motors: 2 double traction motors
- Transmission: Winterthur diagonal side-rod drive
Performance figures
- Maximum speed: 55 km/h (34 mph)
- Power output
  - 1 hour: 2,200 kW (3,000 hp)
  - Continuous: 1,660 kW (2,230 hp)
- Power index: 17.8 kW/t
- Tractive effort
  - Starting: 294 kN (66,000 lb_{f})
Career
- Numbers: DRG E 91 01–20, 81–94; DB 191 001–020, 081, 088–094
- Retired: 1975

=== History ===
As early as 1922 the first order was placed by the Deutsche Reichsbahn for 30 heavy goods train electric locomotives with a C+C wheel arrangement for mountain railway services, as part of their procurement plan for electric locomotives. They were delivered by Krauss (mechanical elements) and WASSEG (electrical equipment) in 1925 and 1926. Sixteen units were allocated to the Bavarian railway network. They were given the designation EG 5 22 501 – 516 by the Bavarian Group Administration. The other 14 machines were deployed to the Silesian network as EG 581 Breslau to EG 594 Breslau. From 1927 they were given operating numbers E 91 01 – 16 and E 91 81 – 94. In 1927 a further four locomotives were delivered that had been ordered with Bavarian operating numbers, but were delivered with the new numbers E 91 17 – 20.

Classes E 91 and E 77 were very similar. The three-axle driven bogies had an inside frame. Each had a double motor driving its axles via a jackshaft and Winterthur diagonal side-rod drive (Schrägstangenantrieb). The superstructure was in three sections. The front and rear sections each had a driver's cab and an engine room and were fixed to the bogies. The centre section was suspended between the front and rear sections and was articulated. The gangways between the individual sections of the engine room were protected by bellows; there were no dividing walls. The Bavarian locomotives could be easily told from their Silesian counterparts by the additional front door between the two cab windows (see photograph, right, of the Bavarian E 91 11, parked up in AW Frankfurt as a stationary transformer for the test shop. Unlike the E 91.9, it had air vents that can be clearly seen along the lower half of the sides).

The machines were to be able to haul goods trains of 1,200 tonnes at 35 km/h on a 10 ‰ incline and passenger trains of 500 tonnes at 45 km/h. Because the engines were intended for goods and passenger services, which did not require high top speeds, these locomotives fully met their intended expectations.

In the DRG, the south German engines remained permanently in Bavaria at Munich main station, Regensburg, Rosenheim and Freilassing locomotive depots. The Silesian machines, whose delivery had begun in 1925, were homed in Hirschberg/Jelenia Góra depot. Of those, numbers E 91 89 to E 91 91 were transferred to Ulm shed in the Stuttgart Reichsbahn railway division in 1933. In 1943, E 91 88 and E 91 94 were moved to Bavaria, and E 91 82, 92 and 93 followed in 1944.

The remaining engines, E 91 83 to E 91 87, were transferred to the Soviet Zone in autumn 1945. They were given to the USSR in 1946 as war reparations. After their return in 1952–53 they remained mothballed. A new lease of life on the Rübeland Railway did not come to fruition, because it soon became apparent that this line would be electrified for 25 kV, 50 Hz. The engines were retired in 1962 and scrapped in 1965.

Of the south German engines, E 91 05 had been retired in 1934 and E 91 17 in 1944. After further retirements, 17 locomotives remained in the DB fleet in 1950 (numbers E 91 01 - 03, 07 - 11, 13, 15, 16, 18, 20, 81, 88, 89 and 94) and they were modernised between 1958 and 1960, all the electrical equipment being renewed. The driver's cabs were changed (gangways and window shields removed and the third window at front and rear replaced with a larger one). On the introduction of computerised operating numbers, the locomotives were reclassified in 1969 to 191s and given three-digit running numbers. In their final years the engines were not only deployed in south German locomotive depots, but also at Oberhausen in the Ruhrgebiet. Due to their low top speed, they were mainly used on shunting duties. They were retired between 1969 and 1975.

== E 91.9 ==
DRG Class E 91^{9} DB Class 191
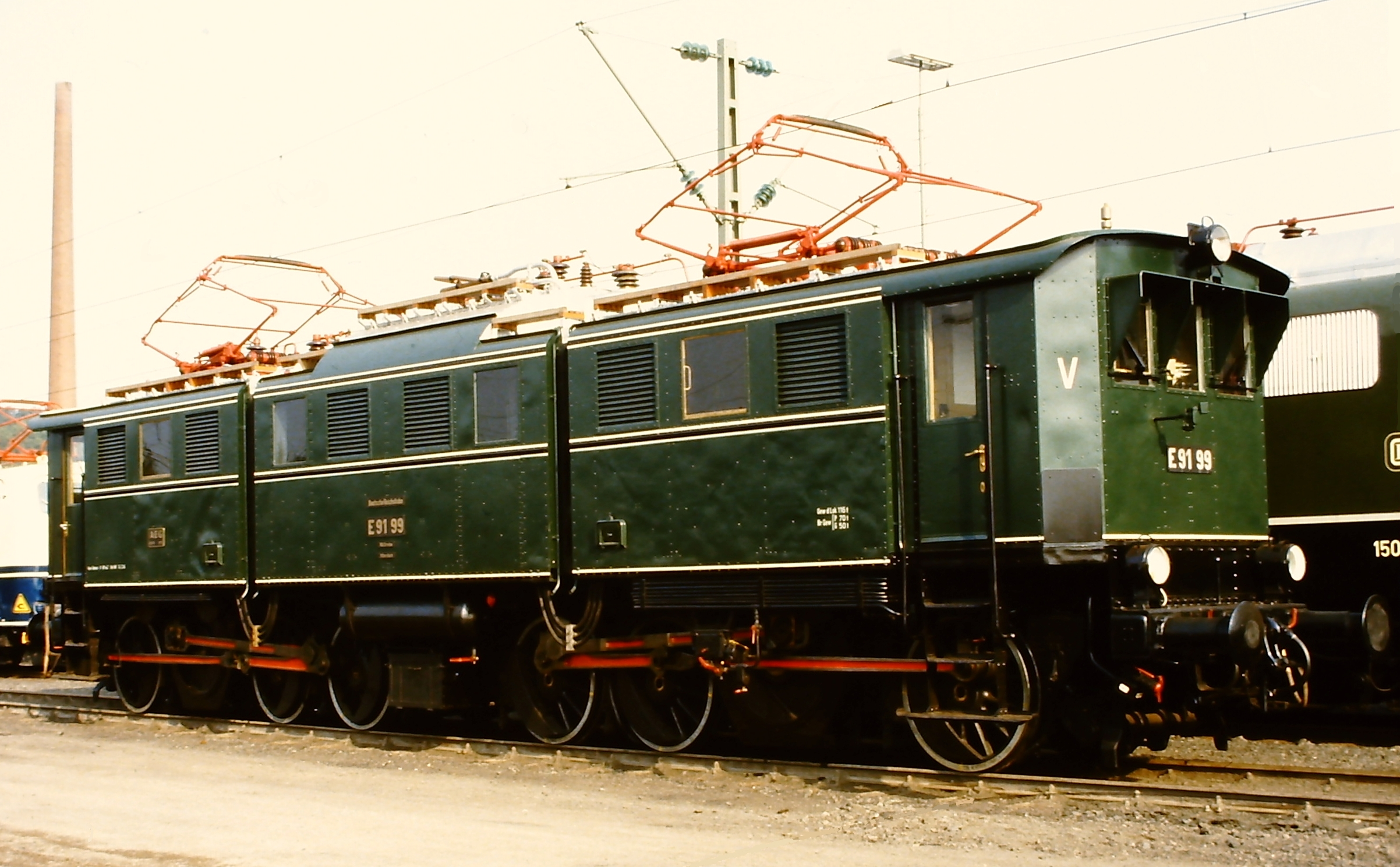
- E 91 099 newly restored at the Munich-Freimann repair shop in 1984
Type and origin
- Builder: AEG, WASSEG
- Build date: 1929
- Total produced: 12
Specifications
- Configuration
  - UIC: C+C
- Gauge: 1,435 mm (4 ft 8 1/2 in)
- Driver dia.: 1,250 mm (49.21 in)
- Length
  - Over beams: 17,300 mm (56 ft 9.1 in)
- Axle load: 19.6 t (19.3 long tons; 21.6 short tons)
- Service weight: 116.4 t (114.6 long tons; 128.3 short tons)
- Electric system/s: 15 kV 16.7 Hz AC Catenary
- Current pickup(s): Pantograph
- Traction motors: 2 double traction motors
- Transmission: Winterthur Schrägstangenantrieb Bauart
Performance figures
- Maximum speed: 55 km/h (34 mph)
- Power output
  - 1 hour: 2,200 kW (3,000 hp)
  - Continuous: 1,660 kW (2,230 hp)
- Power index: 18.9 kW/t
- Tractive effort
  - Starting: 294 kN (66,000 lb_{f})
Career
- Numbers: DRG E 91 95–106; DB 191 097–102
- Retired: 1975

=== History ===
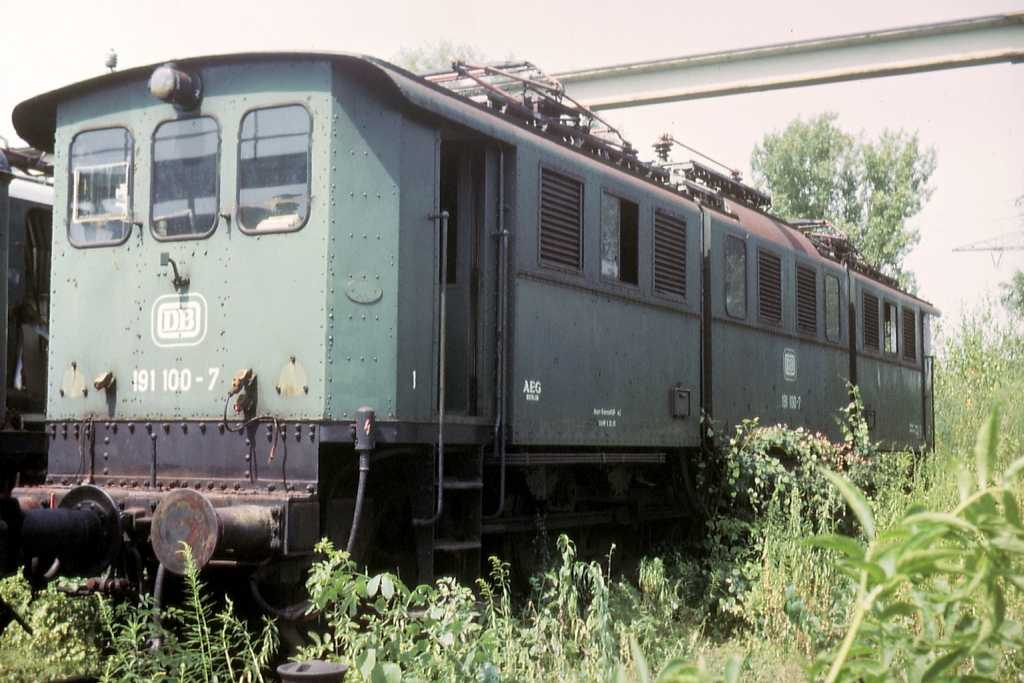
Locomotive 191 100 retired at München-Freimann shop in 1983 and used for spare parts

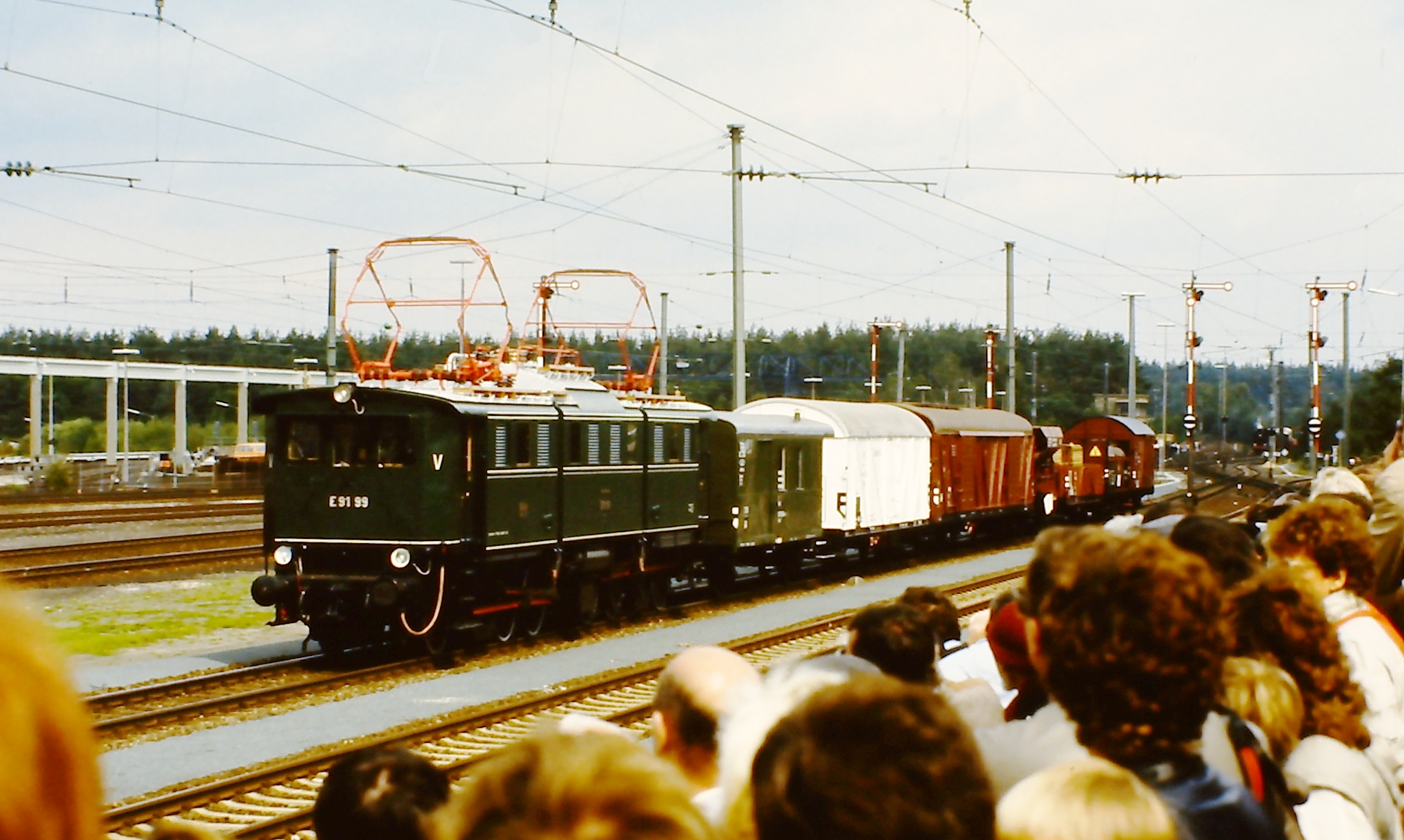
E 91 99 (14.09.1985)

Because more electric locomotives were required as a result of the expansion of the network and the increase in traffic, the Deutsche Reichsbahn-Gesellschaft issued a follow-on order for twelve E 91s in 1927 to cover the most pressing requirements. The locomotives were to be equipped with an electric brake for hauling heavy trains on long inclines. In addition the original design had to be changed in order to save weight. As a platform for testing the electric brake, locomotive E 95 02 was equipped with it on delivery.

The engines were supplied in 1929 by AEG and WASSEG (a joint venture between AEG and SSW) with numbers E 91 95 - 106 and stationed at Waldenburg-Dittersbach / Wałbrzych-Podgórze locomotive depot for duties on the Silesian network. Compared with the original version of the Class E 91, they differed not only technically in terms of their lower weight (a weight saving achieved above all by the traction motors) and electric brakes, but the locomotives were also longer. There was no difference in power between the two types. Externally the newer machines could easily be spotted from their three large cab windows and the air vents along the side, that were all level with the engine room window. In order to distinguish them from the older model, they were grouped into the new class E 91^{9}.

Locomotive E 91 96 was retired as early as 1943 after an accident, but not dismantled in southern Germany until after the war. Even before the end of the war, numbers E 91 95 to E 91 102 were moved to south Germany. Number E 91 104 found itself in the Dessau repair shop (Reichsbahnausbesserungswerk or RAW) with bomb damage. Locomotives E 91 103, 105 and 106 also sent there in October 1945. These three engines and spare parts from the dismantled E 91 104 were sent to the Soviet Union in 1946 as part of the war reparations. After their return in 1952–53 they remained sidelined, were retired in 1962 and scrapped the following year.

The war damage on E 91 95 was not repaired and it was retired in 1949. The remaining locomotives (E 91 97 - 102) remained in service with the Deutsche Bundesbahn and, like the E 91.0 engines, were modernised between 1957 and 1960. On the introduction of the DB classification scheme on 1 January 1968 they were reclassified as 191 097 - 102. Their retirement followed in 1974 (191 097, 098, 102) and 1975 (191 099 - 101).

On 27 November 1975 the last locomotive of Class 191, number 191 099, was retired, but was retained as a museum locomotive. On the occasion of the 150th anniversary of the railway in Germany in (1985) the engine was made operational with parts from 191 100 and was able to take part in the parade of locomotives during the anniversary celebrations. But as a result of damage she had to be sidelined again. She is at present in the Augsburg Railway Park.

== See also ==
- List of DB locomotives and railbuses
- List of DRG locomotives and railbuses
- List of Bavarian locomotives and railbuses

== Literature ==
- Obermayer, Horst J. (1986). Taschenbuch Deutsche Elektrolokomotiven (in German). Vol. 7. Stuttgart: Franckh'sche Verlagshandlung. ISBN 3-440-03754-1.
- Bäzold; Fiebig (1984). Eisenbahn-Fahrzeug-Archiv 4, Elektrische Lokomotiven deutscher Eisenbahnen (in German). Düsseldorf and Berlin: Alba-Verlag and Transpress Verlag. ISBN 3-87094-106-5.
