= Übergangskriegslokomotive =

The Übergangskriegslokomotiven (literally: provisional war locomotives) were austere versions of standard locomotives (Einheitslokomotiven) built by Germany during the Second World War in order to accelerate their production. They are often just called 'ÜK' locomotives.

In the Second World War the requirement for motive power, especially goods train locomotives, rose sharply. To cope with the demand the standard locomotive classes 44, 50 and 86 were built, after 1941, to a simpler, more austere design and given the designation (ÜK) after the class number.

Characteristic of ÜK locomotives are e.g. disc wheels on the carrying axles and the omission of the front side windows in the driver's cabs. Even preheaters, feed pumps, Frontschürzen, smoke deflectors and other equipment not essential for the operation of the locomotives were sometimes left out.

The ÜK classes proved however to be just an interim step. As early as 1941 the requirement for a further, more radical simplification of locomotive construction became ever more pressing. As a result, genuine war locomotives (the Kriegslokomotiven) were developed by the Deutsche Reichsbahn. They were sub-divided into wartime steam locomotives (Kriegs-Dampf-Lokomotiven or KDL) and wartime electric locomotives (Kriegs-Elektrolokomotiven or KEL). Examples include the steam classes 42 and 52, as well as the Class E 44 and E 94.

== See also ==
- DRG Class 44
- DRB Class 50
- DRG Class 86
- DRB Class 52
- DRG Class 42
