= Bavarian EP 2 =

Bavarian EP 2 DRG Class E 32 DB Class 132
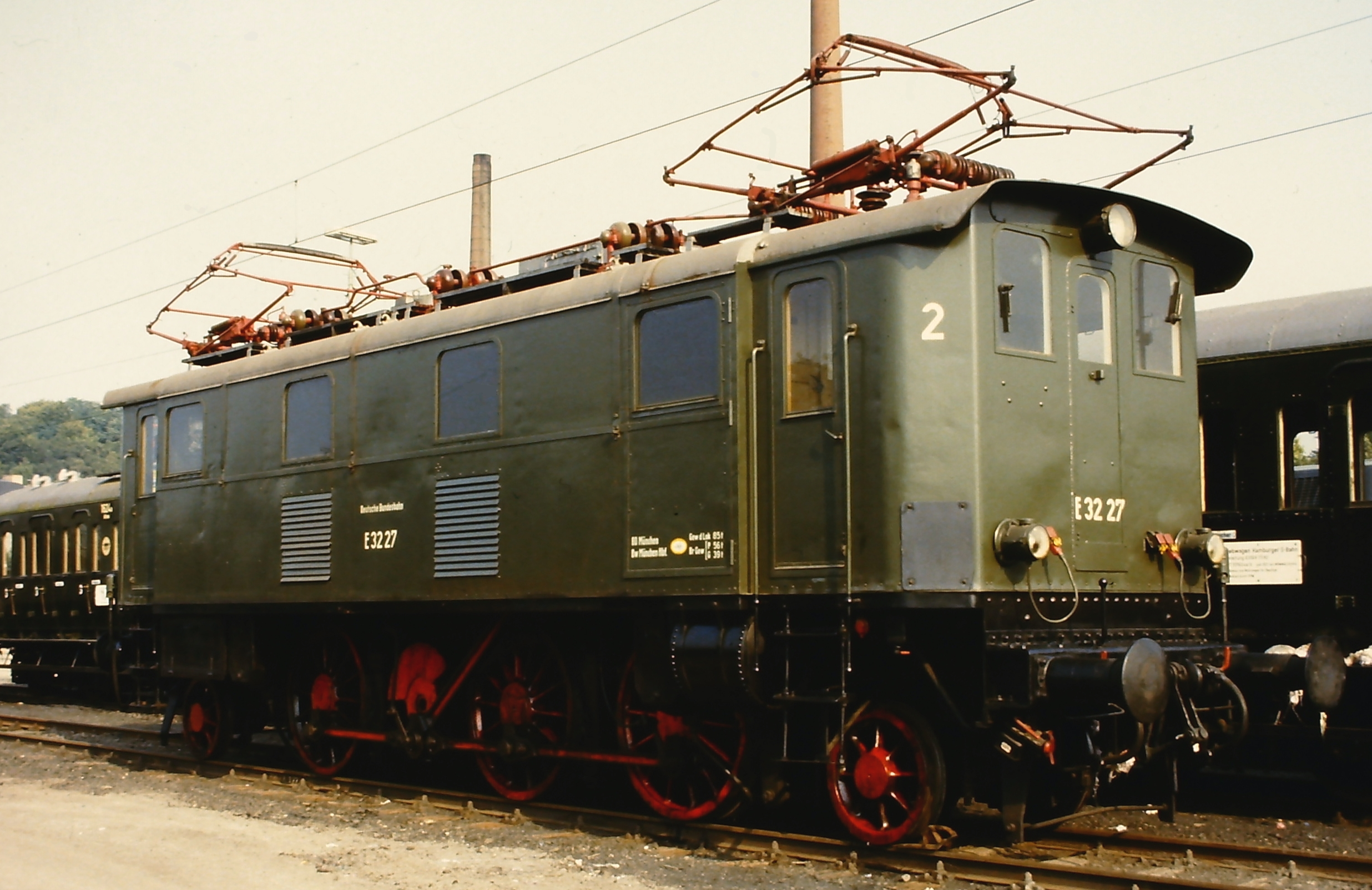
- Museum loco E 32 27
Type and origin
- Builder: Maffei (mechanical); Brown, Boveri & Cie (electrical)
- Build date: E 32.0: 1924; E 32.1: 1932
- Total produced: 29
Specifications
- Configuration
  - UIC: 1′C1′
- Gauge: 1,435 mm (4 ft 8 1/2 in)
- Driver dia.: 1,400 mm (4 ft 7 1/8 in)
- Carrying wheel diameter: 850 mm (2 ft 9 1/2 in)
- Length
  - Over beams: 13,010 mm (42 ft 8 1/4 in)
- Axle load: 18.8 t (18.5 long tons; 20.7 short tons)
- Service weight: 84.8 t (83.5 long tons; 93.5 short tons)
- Electric system/s: 15 kV 16 2/3 Hz AC
- Current pickup(s): Catenary
- Traction motors: 2
- Transmission: Rod drive
- Running step switch: Hand-operated sliding switches (Schlittenschaltwerk) with single contacts, transition resistors and 4 power shift gears (Lastschaltern)
Performance figures
- Maximum speed: E 32.0: 75 km/h (47 mph); E 32.1: 90 km/h (56 mph)
- Power output
  - 1 hour: 1,590 PS (1,170 kW; 1,570 hp)
  - Continuous: 1,370 PS (1,010 kW; 1,350 hp)
- Tractive effort
  - Starting: E 32.0: 107 kN (24,000 lbf); E 32.1: 88.5 kN (19,900 lbf)
Career
- Numbers: E 32 06 – E 32 34; E 32 101 – E 32 108 (Rebuild)
- Retired: by 1972

The electric locomotives of Bavarian Class EP 2 were in light passenger train service in Germany for almost 50 years. After their initial classification as EP 2 by the Royal Bavarian State Railways (Königlich Bayerische Staats-Eisenbahnen), they were redesignated as E 32s from 1927 to 1968 in the DRG's numbering plan and, later in the DB classification scheme. In their final years, post-1968, they were given the EDV-compatible classification of 132. Characteristic of the E 32 was its short length and link drive (Stangenantrieb).

== History ==
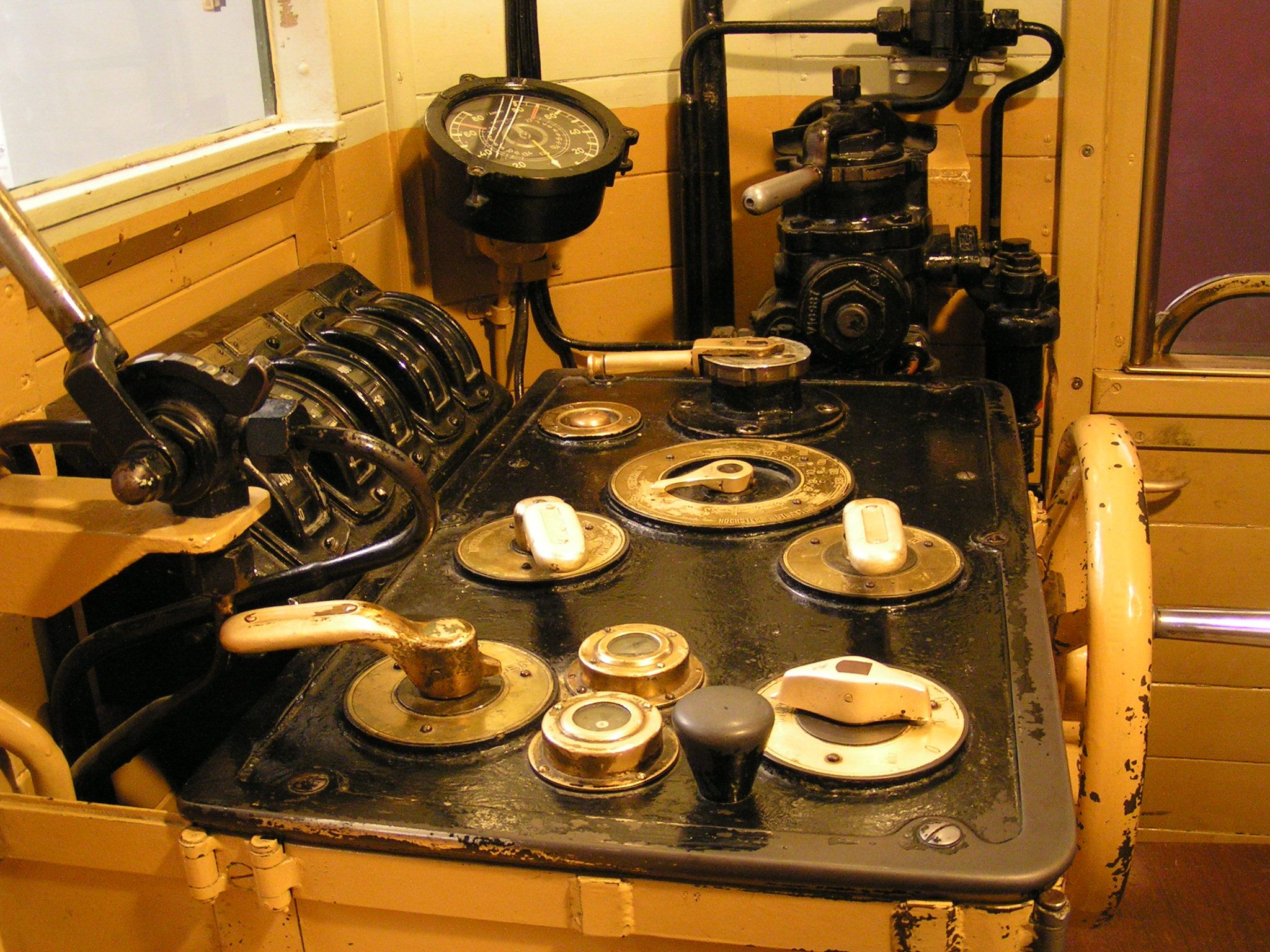
Cab of an E 32 in the Nuremberg Transport Museum Nuremberg

The Bavarian Group Administration of the Deutsche Reichsbahn procured 29 E 32 electric locomotives between 1924 and 1926-29 for light passenger train duties. To begin with they still carried their Bavarian classification of EP2 20 006 to 034, before they were allocated to DRG Class E 32. Numbers 01 to 05 were unused, because they had already been allocated to the Bavarian EP 1 (later DRG Class E 62). The E 32s were employed on all the Upper Bavarian lines. In 1932 the top speed on eight of the engines was raised from 75 to 90 km/h after they had been given new gear transmissions. These eight machines were then given the numbers E 32 101 to 108 (E32.1).

== Deutsche Bundesbahn ==
24 engines were taken over by the Deutsche Bundesbahn after the Second World War, five had had to be written off as war losses. In 1968 22 machines were renumbered ito the EDP system as Class 132. Their service ended on 1 August 1972, when the last eight 132s were retired.

== Museum ==
E 32 27 has been preserved. It is housed in the Bochum-Dahlhausen Railway Museum as a non-operational exhibit.

== See also ==
- Royal Bavarian State Railways
- List of DB locomotives and railbuses
- List of DRG locomotives and railbuses
- List of Bavarian locomotives and railbuses
