= DRG Class 37 =

The DRG Class 37 was a class of German steam locomotives with 2-6-0 wheel arrangements operated by the Deutsche Reichsbahn and may refer to the following:

- Class 37.0-1: Prussian P 6
- Class 37.1-2: PKP Class Oi1
- Class 37.2: LBE G 6
- Class 37.3: ČSD Class 344.0
- Class 37.4: PKP Class Oi101
