= DRG Class 04 =

DRG Class 04 later DRG Class 02.1
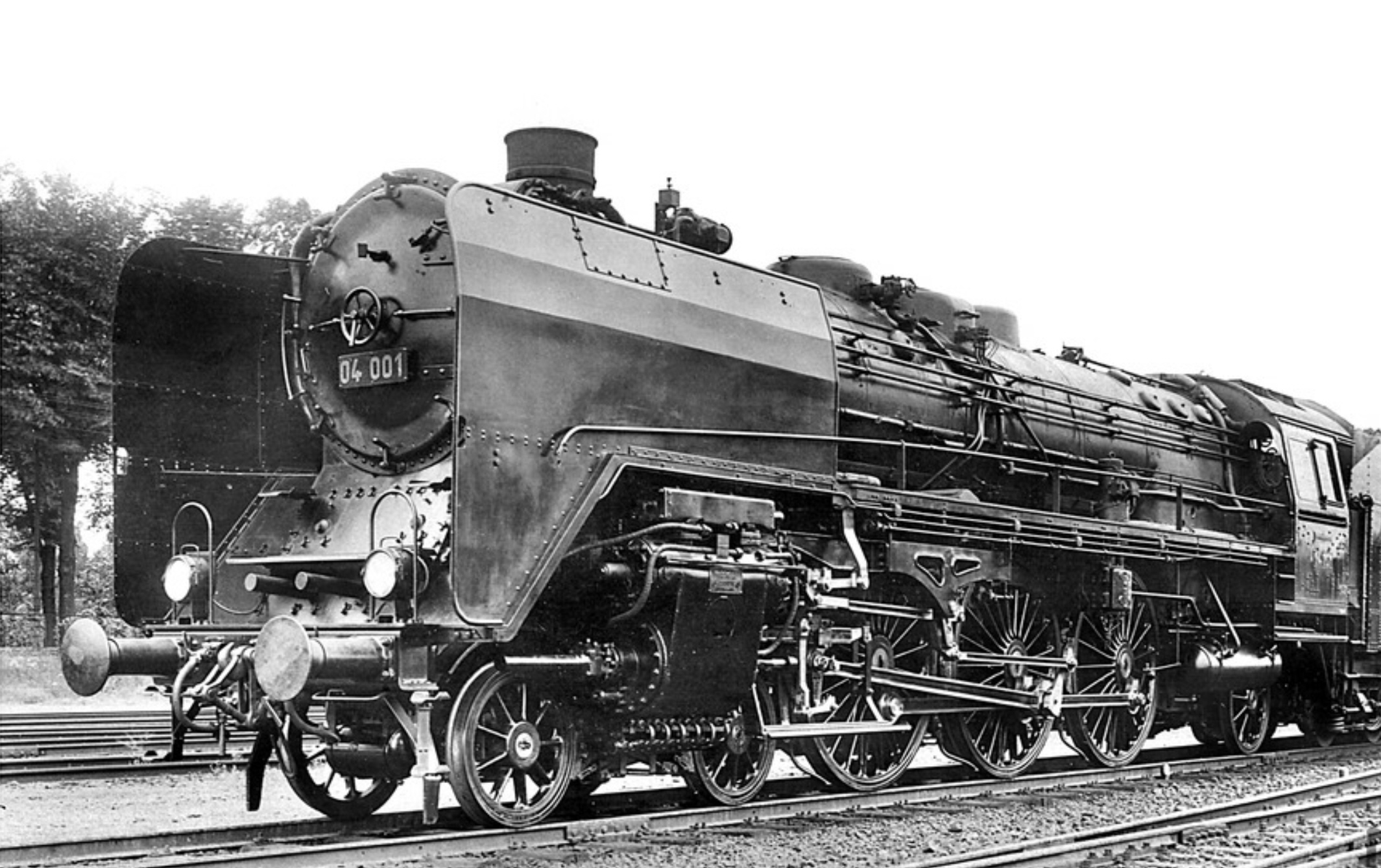
- 04 001 in 1932
Type and origin
- Power type: Steam
- Builder: Krupp
- Serial number: 1194–1195
- Build date: 1932
- Total produced: 2
Specifications
- Configuration
  - Whyte: 4-6-2
  - UIC: 2′C1′ h4v
  - German: S 36.18
- Driver: Divided: inside high-pressure cylinders to first coupled axle, outside low-pressure cylinders to second
- Gauge: 1,435 mm (4 ft 8 1/2 in)
- Leading dia.: 1,000 mm (39 3/8 in)
- Driver dia.: 2,000 mm (78 3/4 in)
- Trailing dia.: 1,250 mm (49 1/4 in)
- Tender wheels: 1,000 mm (39 3/8 in)
- Wheelbase
  - Axle spacing (Asymmetrical): 2,200 mm (7 ft 2 5/8 in) +; 1,800 mm (5 ft 10 7/8 in) +; 2,250 mm (7 ft 4 5/8 in) +; 2,250 mm (7 ft 4 5/8 in) +; 3,500 mm (11 ft 5 3/4 in) =
  - Engine: 12,000 mm (39 ft 4 1/2 in)
  - Tender: 1,900 mm (6 ft 2 3/4 in) +; 1,900 mm (6 ft 2 3/4 in) +; 1,900 mm (6 ft 2 3/4 in) =; 5,700 mm (18 ft 8 3/8 in)
  - incl. tender: 20,225 mm (66 ft 4 1/4 in)
- Length
  - Over headstocks: 22,605 mm (74 ft 2 in)
  - Over buffers: 23,905 mm (78 ft 5 1/8 in)
- Height: 4,550 mm (14 ft 11 1/8 in)
- Axle load: 18.78–18.79 tonnes (18.48–18.49 long tons; 20.70–20.71 short tons)
- Adhesive weight: 54.9–57.6 tonnes (54.0–56.7 long tons; 60.5–63.5 short tons)
- Empty weight: 97.0–118.5 tonnes (95.5–116.6 long tons; 106.9–130.6 short tons)
- Service weight: 106.3–129.9 tonnes (104.6–127.8 long tons; 117.2–143.2 short tons)
- Tender type: 2′2′ T 32
- Fuel type: Coal
- Fuel capacity: 10 tonnes (9.8 long tons; 11 short tons)
- Water cap.: 32 m^{3} (7,000 imp gal; 8,500 US gal)
- Firebox
  - Grate area: 4.10 m^{2} (44.1 sq ft)
- Boiler
  - Pitch: 3,100 mm (10 ft 2 in) +
  - Tube plates: 04 001: 5,800 mm (19 ft 3/8 in); 04 002: 6,800 mm (22 ft 3 3/4 in)
  - Small tubes: 04 001: 54 mm (2 1/8 in), 84 off; 04 002: 70 mm (2 3/4 in), 75 off
  - Large tubes: 04 001: 143 mm (5 5/8 in), 38 off; 04 002: 171 mm (6 3/4 in), 24 off
- Boiler pressure: 25 bar (25.5 kgf/cm^{2}; 363 psi)
- Heating surface
  - Firebox: 20 m^{2} (220 sq ft)
  - Tubes: 04 001: 75.1 m^{2} (808 sq ft); 04 002: 104.3 m^{2} (1,123 sq ft)
  - Flues: 04 001: 93.5 m^{2} (1,006 sq ft); 04 002: 82.5 m^{2} (888 sq ft)
  - Total surface: 04 001: 188.6 m^{2} (2,030 sq ft); 04 002: 206.8 m^{2} (2,226 sq ft)
- Superheater
  - Heating area: 04 001: 88.0 m^{2} (947 sq ft); 04 002: 84.6 m^{2} (911 sq ft)
- Cylinders: Four, compound: HP inside, LP outside
- High-pressure cylinder: 350 mm × 660 mm (13 3/4 in × 26 in)
- Low-pressure cylinder: 520 mm × 660 mm (20 1/2 in × 26 in)
- Valve gear: Heusinger (Walschaerts)
Performance figures
- Maximum speed: 130 km/h (81 mph)
- Indicated power: 2,100–2,320 PS (1,540–1,710 kW; 2,070–2,290 hp) (depending on build state)
Career
- Operators: Deutsche Reichsbahn
- Numbers: DRG 04 001 and 04 002 from 1935: 02 101 and 02 102
- Retired: 1939
- Disposition: Both scrapped

The two German Class 04 steam locomotives were experimental engines with the Deutsche Reichsbahn, that were derived from the Class 03 standard locomotives (Einheitsloks).

== History ==
In 1932, the Deutsche Reichsbahn tried to raise boiler overpressures from 156.9 to 245.1 N/cm^{2} (227.6 to 355.5 psi) by using high-tensile steel. These engines, built by the firm of Krupp, were initially tested at the Grunewald Locomotive Testing Office. With a specific steam consumption value of 5.2 kg/PSh with respect to their indicated output, the locomotives clearly undercut the very low steam consumption value of the Class 03 by over 1 kg/PSh. The coal consumption based on the effective power at the coupling hook, was 0.96 kg/PSh compared with 1.13 kg/PSh on the 03.

The medium-pressure boilers did not prove to be stable, and after a short time damage occurred to the firebox. Since the locomotives did not meet expectations even after modifications and repairs, the permissible boiler overpressure was finally reduced to 20 atmospheres in 1935 and they were added to the operating portfolio with the company numbers 02 101 and 02 102. They were then intended to be used in regular train service from the Hamburg-Altona depot, but since they had no experience with four-cylinder compound locomotives there, they were handed over to the Hof depot in 1936. Due to a lack of water, the boiler of 02 101 exploded on 3 April 1939, whereupon both engines were decommissioned and were scrapped in 1940.

The engines were equipped with a 2′2′ T 32 standard tender.

== See also ==
- List of DRG locomotives and railcars
- List of boiler explosions
