= Kriegslokomotive =

German war locomotives of WWII

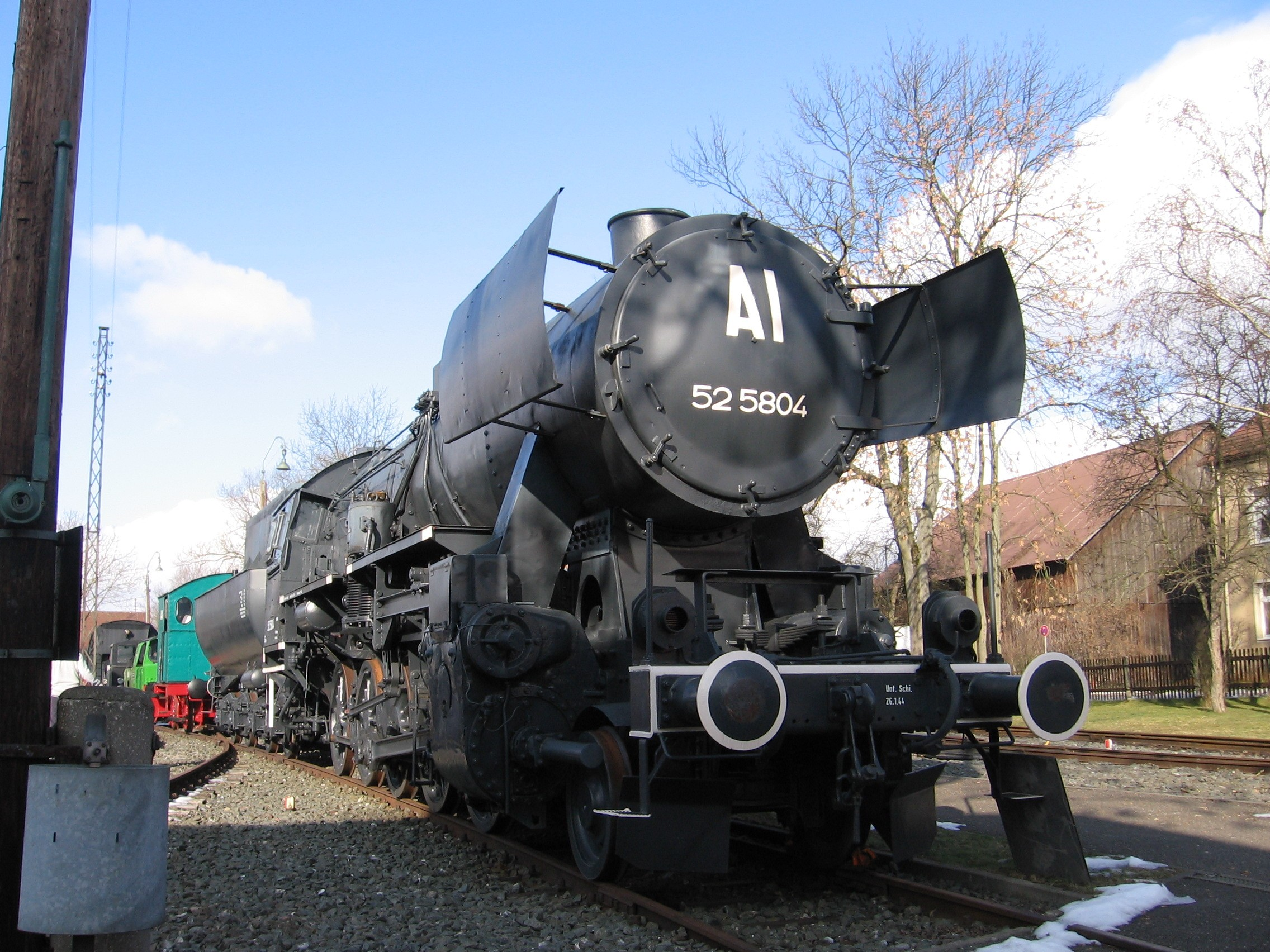
The best-known and the most produced German war locomotive, or Kriegslokomotive: DRB Class 52

Kriegslokomotiven (German: for "war locomotives", singular: Kriegslokomotive, colloquially "Kriegslok") were mostly coal-fired steam locomotives produced in large numbers during the Second World War under Nazi Germany.

Their construction was tailored to the economic circumstances of wartime Germany along with conquered and occupied territories across Europe, taking account of the shortage of materials and oil, the transportation of goods in support of military logistics, ease of maintenance under difficult conditions, resistance to extreme weather, limited life and the need for rapid, cheap mass production. In order to meet these requirements, economic drawbacks such as relatively high fuel consumption had to be accepted. Forced labour was used in the construction of some of the locomotives; German locomotive building firms employed prisoners from concentration camps and foreign, mostly Polish workers.

== Construction ==
The war locomotives (or Kriegslokomotiven) were kept technically as simple as possible and the use of scarce materials (particularly copper) was dropped. Several German firms used prisoners from concentration camps as forced labour in the production of Kriegslokomotiven. Borsig Lokomotiv Werke (AEG) used forced labour from KL Auschwitz, Schichau-Werke used forced labor from KZ Stutthof, and its subcamps. DWM Posen (Deutsche Waffen- und Munitionsfabriken Posen) took over Polish manufacturer H. Cegielski – Poznań and turned its workforce into forced labour. Oberschlesische Lokfabrik Krenau took over Polish manufacturer Fablok and used forced labour under threat of death. Identical engines were produced in Vienna, Kassel, Berlin, Munich, Stuttgart, Kirchen, Plzeň (Pilsen), and Strasbourg.

Even though Diesel locomotives and Diesel railcars originated in Germany, there always was an oil shortage in Europe which mainly depended on the Petrochemical industry in Romania. Germany, and the Dieselisation in Europe, therefore used Diesel multiple units for high speed passenger trains like the Fliegender Hamburger which were mainly useless for the war effort, when oil was needed for other purposes, like lubrication and for submarines. The supply from Romania was under threat as in June 1940 the Soviet occupation of Bessarabia and Northern Bukovina had begun, and the Oil campaign of World War II targeted German Oil industry. Diesel locomotives with reduced emission of smoke and steam, less likely to be spotted by enemy aircraft, were used for special purposes, e.g. for trains that carried VIPs or railway guns.

The manufacture of electric locomotives as Kriegslokomotiven was also a special case, because they could only be used in those parts of the core network where there was already working Railway electrification infrastructure able to supply the special 16.7 Hertz 15 kV AC railway electrification current: power stations, overhead transmission lines, electricity substations and catenary. As a rule, locomotives were preferred that were dependent on additional infrastructure as little as possible.

German electric locomotives were given aluminium windings in the traction motors and transformers, and the steam engines had steel fireboxes, hence the name Heimstofflok or 'home-grown loco'.

== Classes ==
A Kriegslokomotive usually had two classifications: one based on the normal peacetime classification system and a separate wartime classification. For example, a wartime steam locomotive or Kriegsdampflokomotive (KDL) was given a KDL class as well as its DRG (Deutsche Reichsbahn) class. Likewise a wartime motorised locomotive or Kriegsmotorlokomotive had a KML class number and a wartime electric locomotive or Kriegselektrolokomotive would have a KEL class number. Besides the DRG, the German Armed Forces had their own locomotive classes. A narrow gauge field railway locomotive belonging to the Army were known as a Heeresfeldbahnlokomotive or HF. Standard gauge engines for the Wehrmacht, mostly diesel switchers, were designated "Wehrmacht Standard Gauge Locomotive" (Wehrmachtslokomotive für Regelspur) or WR.

The following classes of Kriegslokomotive were procured by the Deutsche Reichsbahn and other customers (industrial and military railways) during the Second World War:

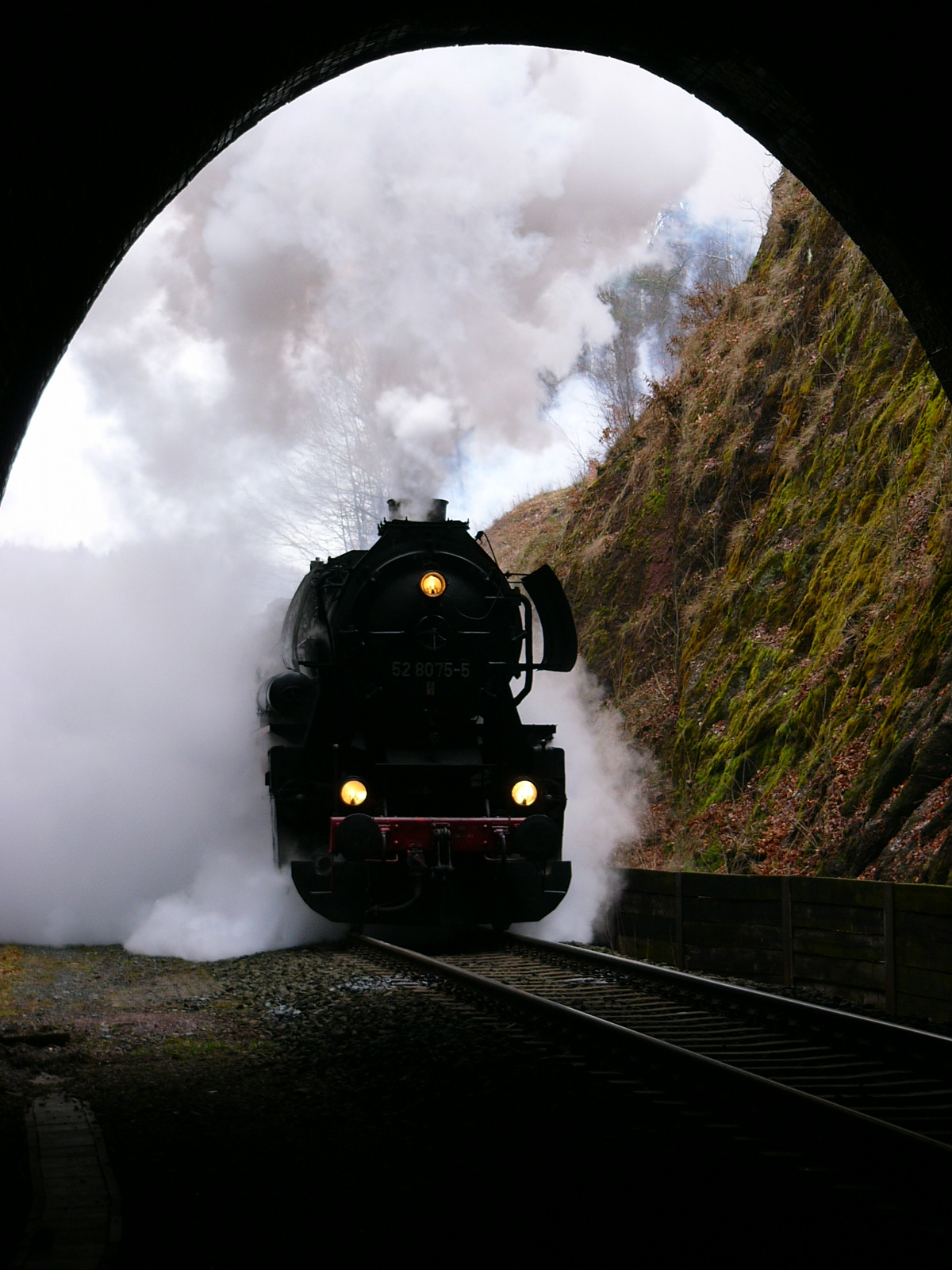
Former Kriegslokomotive, rebuilt by Deutsche Reichsbahn

Steam locomotives (Kriegsdampflokomotive or "KDL")

- DRB Class 52 (KDL 1)
- BMB Class 534.0 (KDL 2)
- DRG Class 42 (KDL 3)
- ELNA 6 0-8-0T industrial (KDL 4)
- 0-10-0T industrial (KDL 5)
- 0-8-0T industrial (KDL 6)
- 0-6-0T industrial (KDL 7)
- 0-4-0T industrial (KDL 8)
- 900 mm gauge 0-6-0T industrial (KDL 9)
- 900 mm gauge 0-4-0T industrial (KDL 10)
- HF 160 D (KDL 11)
- HF 70 C (KDL 12)
- Henschel "Riesa" type construction locomotive, austere version, (KDL 13)

Internal combustion locomotives (Kriegsmotorlokomotive or KML)

- WR 360 C 14 (KML 1)
- WR D 311 - 2 were used on the 80 cm Schwerer Gustav railway guns. Also base of some post-war development.
- DRG Köf II (KML 2)
- HF 130 C (KML 3)
- HF 50 B (KML 4)
- O&K MD 2 (KML 5)
- Twin-axled mining locomotives (KML 6, KML 7, KML 8)

Electric locomotives (Kriegselektrolokomotive or KEL)

- DRG Class E 44 (KEL 1)
- DRG Class E 94 (KEL 2)
- 900 mm gauge Bo′Bo′ mining (KEL 4)
- 550–630 mm gauge Bo industrial (KEL 5)
- 550–630 mm gauge Bo′Bo′ mining (KEL 6)
- Bo Battery-electric mining (KEL 7, KEL 8, KEL 9)

Fireless steam locomotives (Dampfspeicherlokomotive)

- 0-6-0 (KFL 1)
- 0-4-0 (KFL 2)

A large number of DRB Class 52 locomotives were rebuilt by Deutsche Reichsbahn into DR Class 52.80.

== See also ==
- Einheitsdampflokomotive, standard steam locomotive
- Übergangskriegslokomotive, transitional war locomotive
