= Kuk HB Class 578 =

k.u.k. HB Class 578 / PKP Class TKp 101 / BBÖ Class 578 / ÖBB Class 292
Type and origin
- Builder: Henschel
- Build date: 1916–1917
- Total produced: k.u.k. HB: 22; PKP: 10; BBÖ: 12; ÖBB: 8
Specifications
- Configuration
  - Whyte: 0-8-0T
  - UIC: Dn2t
- Gauge: 1,435 mm (4 ft 8 1/2 in)
- Driver dia.: 1,090 mm
- Wheelbase
  - Overall: 4,200 mm
- Length
  - Over beams: 10,940 mm
- Height: 4,100 mm
- Adhesive weight: 58.0 t
- Service weight: 58.0 t
- Fuel capacity: 2.0 t coal
- Water cap.: 7.5 m^{3}
- Boiler
- No. of heating tubes: 217
- Heating tube length: 3,900 mm
- Boiler pressure: 13.0 atm
- Heating surface
  - Firebox: 2.00 m^{2}
  - Radiative: 8.8 m^{2}
  - Tubes: 105.0 m^{2} (feuerberührt)
  - Evaporative: 113.8 m^{2} (feuerberührt)
- Cylinders: 2
- Cylinder size: 540 mm
- Piston stroke: 550 mm
- Valve gear: Walschaerts (Heusinger)
Performance figures
- Maximum speed: 45 km/h
Career
- Numbers: k.u.k. HB 578.01–22, BBÖ 578.11–22, ÖBB 292.2101–2112 (with gaps)
- Retired: 1966 (ÖBB)

The steam locomotive class k.u.k HB 578 was a tank engine operated by the Imperial and Royal Military Field Railway (k.u.k. Heeresfeldbahn) in Austria-Hungary.

In World War I, the Austrian Military Railway placed their order for additional locomotives with Henschel in Kassel, because the Austrian locomotive factories were working at full capacity. These 22 locomotives had typical Prussian features and were grouped into Class 578. After the war's end, 10 engines were left in Poland as PKP Class TKp101 and twelve with the BBÖ, which retained their classification and serial numbers and set them to work as shunters on the large Viennese railway stations.

In 1938, the Deutsche Reichsbahn classified them as 92.2101–2112. Seven Polish TKp101 also joined the DRG during the course of fighting in the Second World War and were numbered 92.2113–2119.

After the end of the war, eight engines were left with the ÖBB, which were classified as ÖBB Class 292 and retained their serial numbers. They were retired by 1966.

== See also ==
- Deutsche Reichsbahn
- List of DRG locomotives and railbuses
