= DRG H 02 1001 =

German locomotive

H 02 1001
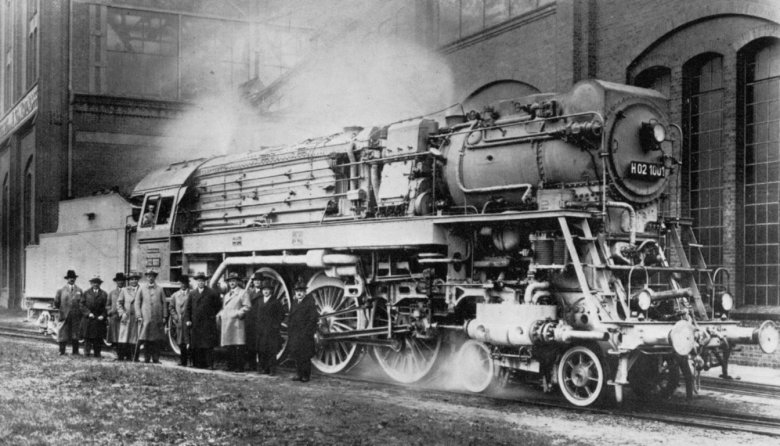
- A works photograph of H 02 1001
Type and origin
- Power type: Steam
- Builder: Berliner Maschinenbau
- Serial number: 8831
- Build date: 1929/1930
- Total produced: 1
Specifications
- Configuration
  - Whyte: 4-6-2
  - UIC: 2′C1′ h3v
- Gauge: 1,435 mm (4 ft 8 1/2 in)
- Leading dia.: 850 mm (2 ft 9 1/2 in)
- Driver dia.: 2,000 mm (6 ft 6 3/4 in)
- Trailing dia.: 1,250 mm (4 ft 1 1/4 in)
- Minimum curve: 140 m (460 ft)
- Length
  - Over buffers: 23,750 mm (77 ft 11 in)
- Adhesive weight: 60 tonnes (59 long tons; 66 short tons)
- Empty weight: 111.5 tonnes (109.7 long tons; 122.9 short tons)
- Service weight: 115 tonnes (113 long tons; 127 short tons)
- Tender type: 2′2′ T 32
- Fuel type: Coal
- Fuel capacity: 10 t (9.8 long tons; 11 short tons)
- Water cap.: 32 m^{3} (7,000 imp gal; 8,500 US gal)
- Firebox
  - Grate area: 2.4 m^{2} (26 sq ft)
- Boiler pressure: 120 bar (122 kgf/cm^{2}; 1,740 psi)
- Cylinders: Three, compound: 2 HP outside, 1 LP inside
- High-pressure cylinder: 220 mm × 660 mm (8 11/16 in × 26 in)
- Low-pressure cylinder: 600 mm × 660 mm (23 5/8 in × 26 in)
Performance figures
- Maximum speed: 110 km/h (68 mph)
- Indicated power: 2,500 PS (1,840 kW; 2,470 hp)
Career
- Retired: 1945
- Scrapped: 1954
- Disposition: Scrapped

The DRG H 02 1001 was a high-pressure steam locomotive built by the engineering firm of Berliner Maschinenbau (formerly L. Schwarzkopff) to the design of Dr L. Löffler. The aim was not only to improve fuel economy—the usual reason for adopting high steam pressures—but also to increase the amount of power that could be produced within the German loading gauge.

The H02 1001 locomotive was the only example of the Schwarzkopff-Löffler high-pressure boiler system, a complex technology in which heat was extracted from the firebox by tubes filled with steam rather than boiling water. It was delivered in 1930 to the Deutsche Reichsbahn (DRG). Schwarzkopff guaranteed in the purchase contract a coal saving of 42% over a standard 01 locomotive design, but in the event the DRG never bought the locomotive.

Steam was delivered at no less than 1,750 lbf/in^{2} (123 kgf/cm^{2}; 12.1 MPa) to two very small outside cylinders of 220 mm (8 11/16 in) diameter. These were compounded with a single 600 mm (23 5/8 in) LP inside cylinder. The wheel arrangement was 4-6-2.

After extensive trials it was found that any increase in efficiency was small compared with the greatly increased maintenance costs. The very complicated H02 1001 was also hopelessly unreliable.

The H02 1001 was retired from active service in 1945, then cut up for scrap.

== See also ==
- List of DRG locomotives and railcars
