= Bavarian D IV =

Bavarian D V, Palatine (Pfalz) T 1 DRG Class 88.71–73
Type and origin
- Builder: Krauss; Maffei
- Build date: 1878–1897
- Total produced: Bay. D V: 132; Pfalz T 1: 31
Specifications
- Configuration
  - Whyte: 0-4-0T
- Gauge: 1,435 mm (4 ft 8 1/2 in)
- Length
  - Over beams: 8,005 mm (26 ft 3 1/4 in)
- Adhesive weight: 28.8 t (28.3 long tons; 31.7 short tons)
- Service weight: 28.8 t (28.3 long tons; 31.7 short tons)
- Boiler pressure: 10 kgf/cm^{2} (981 kPa; 142 lbf/in^{2})
- Heating surface
  - Firebox: 1.00 m^{2} (10.8 sq ft)
  - Evaporative: 64.30 m^{2} (692.1 sq ft)
- Cylinders: 2
- Cylinder size: 330 mm (13 in)
- Piston stroke: 508 mm (20 in)
Performance figures
- Maximum speed: 45 km/h (28 mph)
Career
- Numbers: K.Bay.Sts.E: 700…968, 31…117, 1701–1737; DRG: 88 7101 –7201; Pfalz: 177–186, 15…73; DRG: 88 7301 – 88 7321
- Retired: 1930

The little D IV was one of the most frequently seen tank locomotives in the stations of the Royal Bavarian State Railways (Königlich Bayerische Staatsbahn). The Deutsche Reichsbahn took over almost all of them, 124 in total, of which 24 were from the Palatinate (Pfalz).

== See also ==
- Royal Bavarian State Railways
- List of Bavarian locomotives and railbuses
