= Prussian P 6 =

Class of 275 German 2-6-0 locomotive

Prussian P 6 DRG Class 37.0–1 PKP Oi1
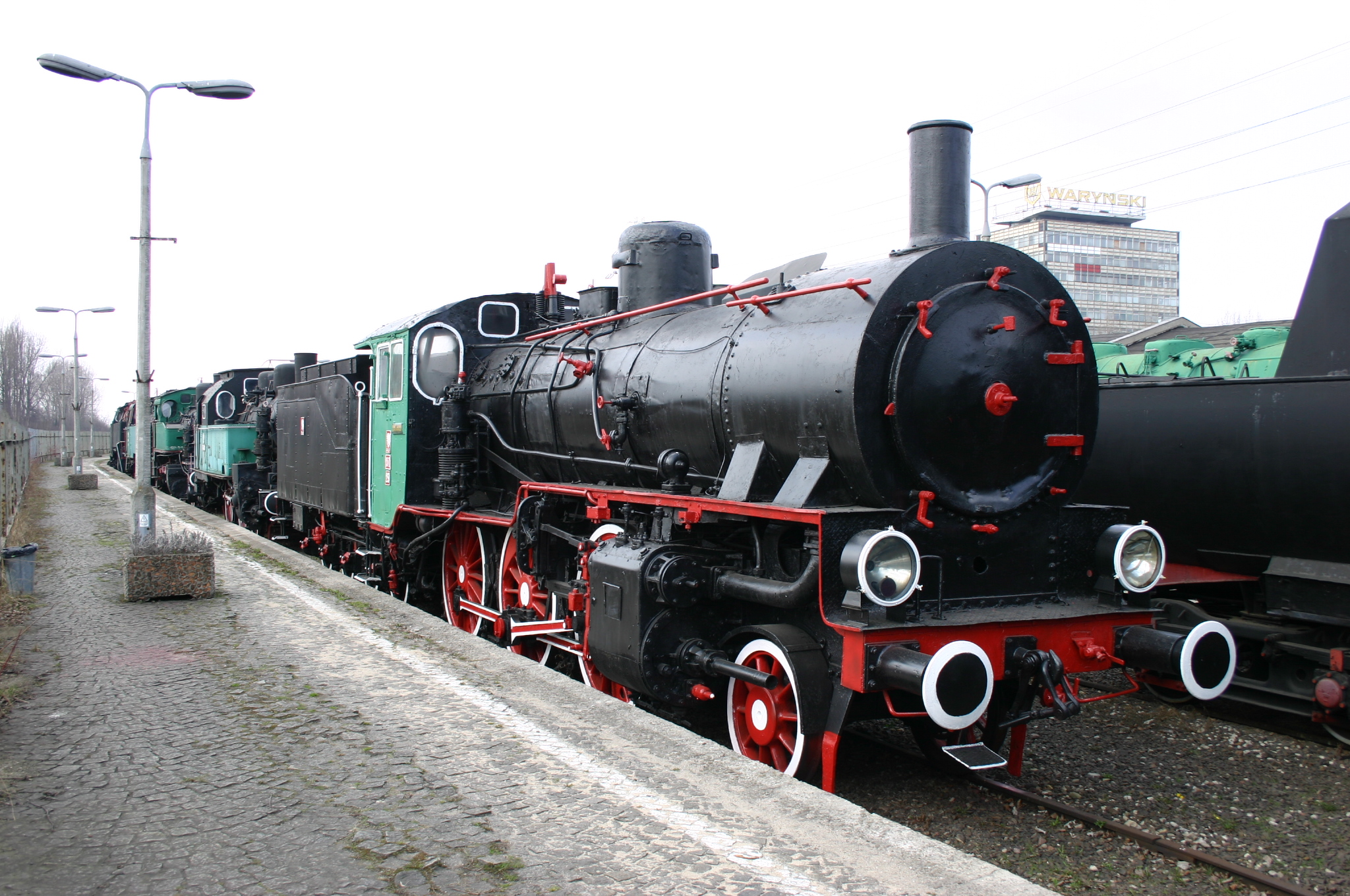
- Oi1-29 ex 37 171
Type and origin
- Builder: Hohenzollern, Schwartzkopff
- Build date: 1902–1910
- Total produced: 275
Specifications
- Configuration
  - Whyte: 2-6-0
- Gauge: 1,435 mm (4 ft 8 1/2 in) standard gauge
- Leading dia.: 1,000 mm (39.37 in)
- Driver dia.: 1,600 mm (62.99 in)
- Length
  - Over beams: 17,608 mm (57 ft 9 1/4 in)
- Axle load: 15.2 t (15.0 long tons; 16.8 short tons)
- Adhesive weight: 44.6 t (43.9 long tons; 49.2 short tons)
- Service weight: 57.1 t (56.2 long tons; 62.9 short tons)
- Water cap.: 16.0 m^{3} (3,500 imp gal; 4,200 US gal)
- Boiler pressure: 12 bar (1,200 kPa; 170 psi)
- Heating surface
  - Firebox: 2.28 m^{2} (24.5 sq ft)
  - Evaporative: 134.93 m^{2} (1,452.4 sq ft)
- Superheater
  - Heating area: 41.91 m^{2} (451.1 sq ft)
- Cylinders: 2
- Cylinder size: 540 mm (21.26 in)
- Piston stroke: 630 mm (24.80 in)
Performance figures
- Maximum speed: 90 km/h (56 mph)
- Indicated power: 755 kW (1,012 hp)
Career
- Numbers: DRG 37 001–163
- Retired: about 1950

The Prussian Class P 6s were passenger locomotives operated by the Prussian state railways with a leading axle and three coupled axles.

The P 6 was conceived as a so-called universal locomotive. The first vehicle was manufactured in 1902 at Düsseldorf by the firm of Hohenzollern. This engine has a number of features that are characteristic of its designer, Robert Garbe: a narrow chimney located well forward and the unusual position of the boiler. As a result, and in spite of the relatively small, 1,600 mm (62.99 in) diameter, driving wheels (on the prototype they were only 1,500 mm or 59.06 in), the locomotives were authorised to travel at up to 90 km/h (56 mph), a speed which could not be attained in practice due to its poor riding qualities.

The smokebox superheater installed on the first machines was soon replaced by a smoke tube superheater. In all, 275 engines of this class were built up to 1910. 110 examples had to be handed over after the First World War as reparations: 44 to Poland (PKP Oi1), 24 to Belgium, 19 to France (16 to the Nord (3.1551–3.1566), 3 to Alsace-Lorraine), 9 to Italy (FS 626), 6 to Lithuania, 4 to Latvia and 4 to the Territory of the Saar Basin (2101–2104). 163 locomotives were taken over by the Deutsche Reichsbahn as DRG Class 37.0-1, where they were allocated the running numbers 37 001 to 37 163. In 1935 the four Saar locomotives were incorporated into the DRG fleet as 37 164 to 37 167.

The locomotives with numbers 37 201–206 were, by contrast, G 6 and P 6 class engines respectively of Lübeck-Büchen Railway (LBE), that had a different design from the Prussian locomotives.

The Prussian P 6s were retired by about 1950. The few engines left after the Second World War were no longer employed by the Deutsche Bundesbahn and the Reichsbahn.

The locomotives taken over by the Polish State Railways (PKP) were given the designation Oi1. One of them has been preserved and can be viewed in the Warsaw Railway Museum. The engines were equipped with Prussian tenders of class pr 2'2' T 16.

== See also ==
- Prussian state railways
- List of Prussian locomotives and railcars
- List of preserved steam locomotives in Germany
