= Bavarian D V =

Bavarian D V DRG Class 89.81
Type and origin
- Builder: Maffei
- Build date: 1877–1878
- Total produced: 10
Specifications
- Configuration
  - Whyte: 0-6-0T
- Gauge: 1,435 mm (4 ft 8 1/2 in)
- Driver dia.: 1,212 mm (3 ft 11 3/4 in)
- Length
  - Over beams: 8,801 mm (28 ft 10 1/2 in)
- Axle load: 15.2 t (15.0 long tons; 16.8 short tons)
- Adhesive weight: 44.6 t (43.9 long tons; 49.2 short tons)
- Service weight: 44.6 t (43.9 long tons; 49.2 short tons)
- Boiler pressure: 12 kgf/cm^{2} (1,180 kPa; 171 lbf/in^{2})
- Heating surface
  - Firebox: 1.64 m^{2} (17.7 sq ft)
  - Evaporative: 92.00 m^{2} (990.3 sq ft)
- Cylinders: 2
- Cylinder size: 420 mm (16 9/16 in)
- Piston stroke: 610 mm (24 in)
Performance figures
- Maximum speed: 45 km/h (28 mph)
Career
- Numbers: K.Bay.Sts.E: 379–384, 793–796; DRG: 89 8101 – 89 8110
- Retired: 1928

The 10 examples of the Class D V (pronounced "D 5") steam engine belonging the Royal Bavarian State Railways (Königlich Bayerische Staatsbahn) were the first six-coupled tank locomotives in Bavaria. They were intended specifically for working the hilly route between Plattling and Eisenstein. Because they did not deliver the expected performance, however, they were soon relegated to shunting duties.

That said, all 10 engines went into the Reichsbahn, where they were incorporated into the numbering plan as the Class 89.81. However, they were soon replaced by Class 89.6, the ex-Bavarian R 3/3 engines. They began to be taken out of service in 1925. The last two, numbers 89 8106 and 89 8107 were retired in 1928.

== See also ==
- Royal Bavarian State Railways
- List of Bavarian locomotives and railbuses
