= DRG Class E 44 =

DRG Class E 44 DB Class 144/145 DR Class 244
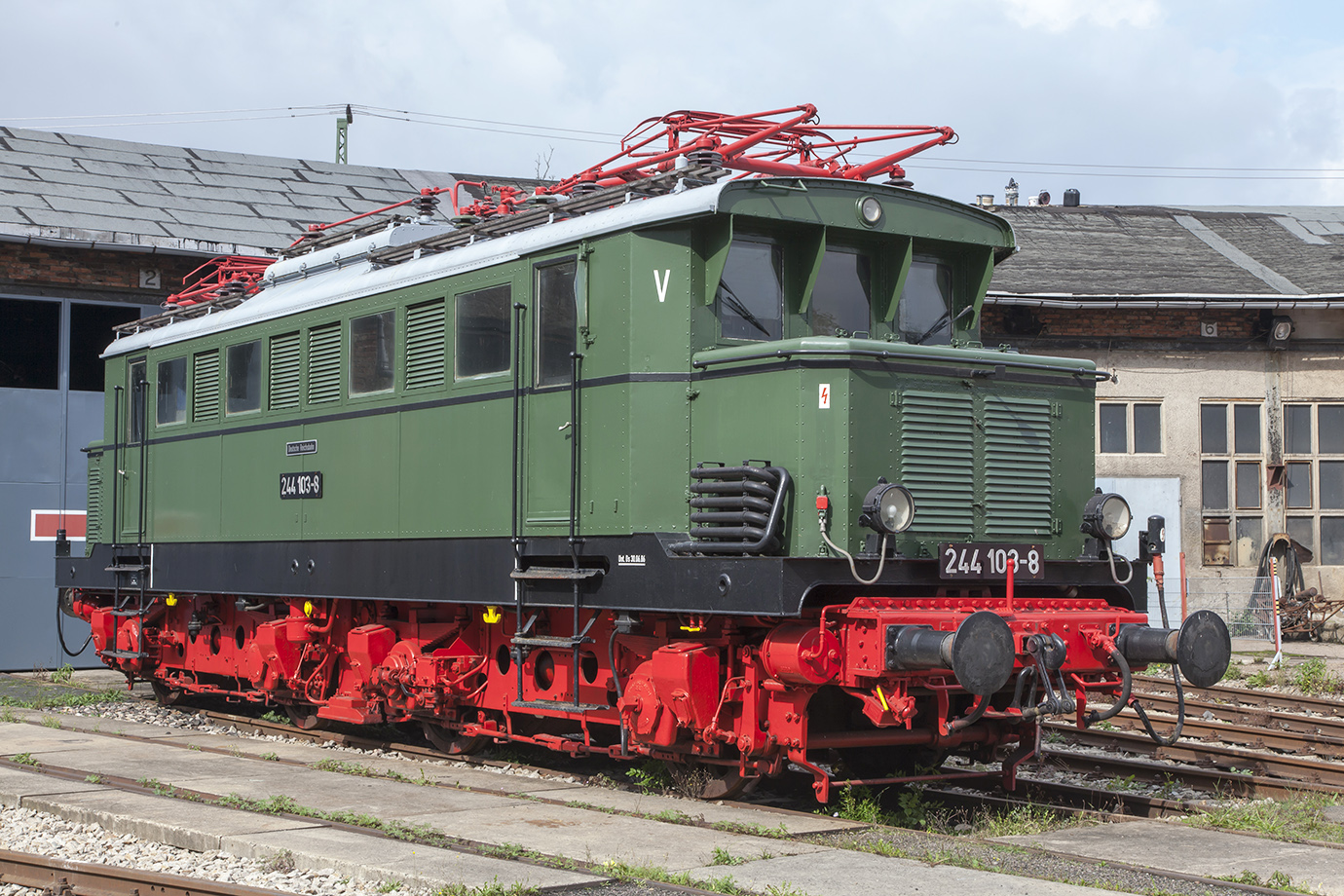
- 244 103 at Weimar railway museum, 2015
Type and origin
- Power type: Electric
- Builder: Henschel & Son, Krauss-Maffei, Lokomotivfabrik Floridsdorf, SSW (E 44.0), AEG, BMAG (E 44.5)
- Build date: 1930–1945 (E 44.0 originals), 1950–1965 (E 44.0 replicas and rebuilds), 1931–1935 (E 44.5)
- Total produced: 176 (E 44.0 originals), 13 (E 44.0 replicas and rebuilds), 9 (E 44.5)
Specifications
- Configuration
  - UIC: Bo′Bo′
- Gauge: 1,435 mm (4 ft 8 1/2 in)
- Wheel diameter: 1,250 mm (4 ft 1 1/4 in)
- Wheelbase: 9,800 mm (32 ft 1 7/8 in), 9,150 or 9,700 mm (30 ft 1/4 in or 31 ft 9 7/8 in) (E 44.5)
  - Bogie: 3,500 mm (11 ft 5 3/4 in), 3,300 or 3,400 mm (10 ft 9 7/8 in or 11 ft 1 7/8 in) (E 44.5)
- Pivot centres: 6,300 mm (20 ft 8 in), 5,640 mm (18 ft 6 in) (E 44.5)
- Length
  - Over buffers: 15,290 mm (50 ft 2 in), 13,150 or 13,520 mm (43 ft 1 3/4 in or 44 ft 4 1/4 in) (E 44.5)
- Width: 2,960 mm (9 ft 8 1/2 in), 3,190 mm (10 ft 5 5/8 in) (E 44.5)
- Height: 3,950 mm (12 ft 11 1/2 in), 3,950 or 4,260 mm (12 ft 11 1/2 in or 13 ft 11 3/4 in) (E 44.5)
- Axle load: 19.5 t (19.2 long tons; 21.5 short tons), 19.8 or 19.9 t (19.5 or 19.6 long tons; 21.8 or 21.9 short tons) (E 44.5)
- Service weight: 78.0 t (76.8 long tons; 86.0 short tons), 79.2 or 79.6 t (77.9 or 78.3 long tons; 87.3 or 87.7 short tons) (E 44.5)
- Electric system/s: 15 kV 16 2/3 Hz AC Catenary
- Current pickup: Pantograph
- Traction motors: nose-suspended, 4 off
- Head end power: 800/1000 V 16 2/3 Hz AC
- Running steps: 15
- Running step switch: manual cam switch and resistors
- MU working: push-pull (E 44B, E 44G)
- Loco brake: Air (K-GP mZ), rheostatic (E 44W)
- Train brakes: Air
Performance figures
- Maximum speed: 90 km/h (56 mph), 80 or 90 km/h (50 or 56 mph) (E 44.5)
- Power output
  - 1 hour: 2,200 kW (2,950 hp), 1,600 kW (2,150 hp) (E 44 501–505)
  - Continuous: 1,860 kW (2,490 hp)
- Tractive effort
  - Starting: 196 kN (44,000 lb_{f})
Career
- Numbers: E 44 001–175, 178 (E 44.0 originals); E 44 176, 177, 179–189 ( E 44.0 replicas and rebuilds); E 44 501–509 (E 44.5)
- Retired: DB: 1983/1984; DR: 1991
- Disposition: 21 preserved, remainder scrapped

The class E 44 is a type of electric mixed-traffic locomotives built for Deutsche Reichsbahn-Gesellschaft (DRG) from 1930. There are two technical different subclasses, the E 44.0 and the E 44.5.

== E 44.0 ==
One prototype numbered as E 44 001 was built in 1930 and further 175 units with the numbers E 44 002 to 175 and E 44 178 were built until the end of the Second World War. Eleven locomotives were ordered by Deutsche Bundesbahn (DB) and delivered between 1950 and 1955 as E 44 176 and 177 and E 44 179 to 187. Two were rebuilt from E 244 prototype locomotives in 1963 and 1965 as E 44 188 and 189. Now DB had 125 units in service. Until 1960 Deutsche Reichsbahn (DR) repaired 46 locomotives they got back from the Soviet Union. In 1968 DB reclassified its E 44 locomotives to 144 and E 44W locomotives, equipped with rheostatic braking, to 145. In 1970 DR reclassified them to 244. The last locomotives were retired by DR in 1991. Nineteen locomotives with the numbers E 44 001, 002, 044, 045, 046, 049, 051, 084, 103, 108, 119, 131, 137, 139, 143, 146, 148, 150 and 170W have been preserved.

== E 44.5 ==
One prototype and another eight E 44.5 locomotives were put into service between 1931 and 1935 as E 44 101 to 109 and renumbered E 44 501 to 509 from 1938. They were technical different from the E 44.0 and were intended for the Bad Reichenhall to Berchtesgaden railway line and mainly used their until its withdrawal by DB in 1983. Two locomotives with the numbers E 44 502 and 508 have been preserved.

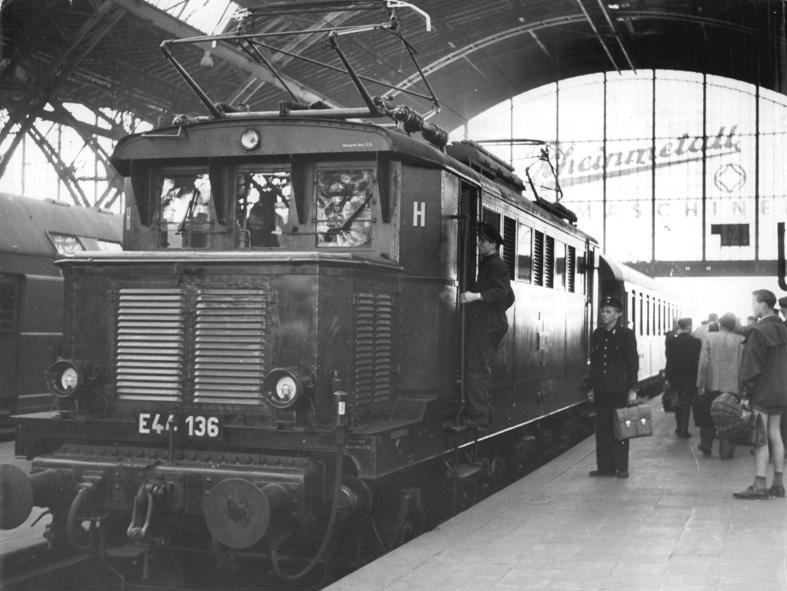
E 44 136 at Leipzig Hbf, May 1958

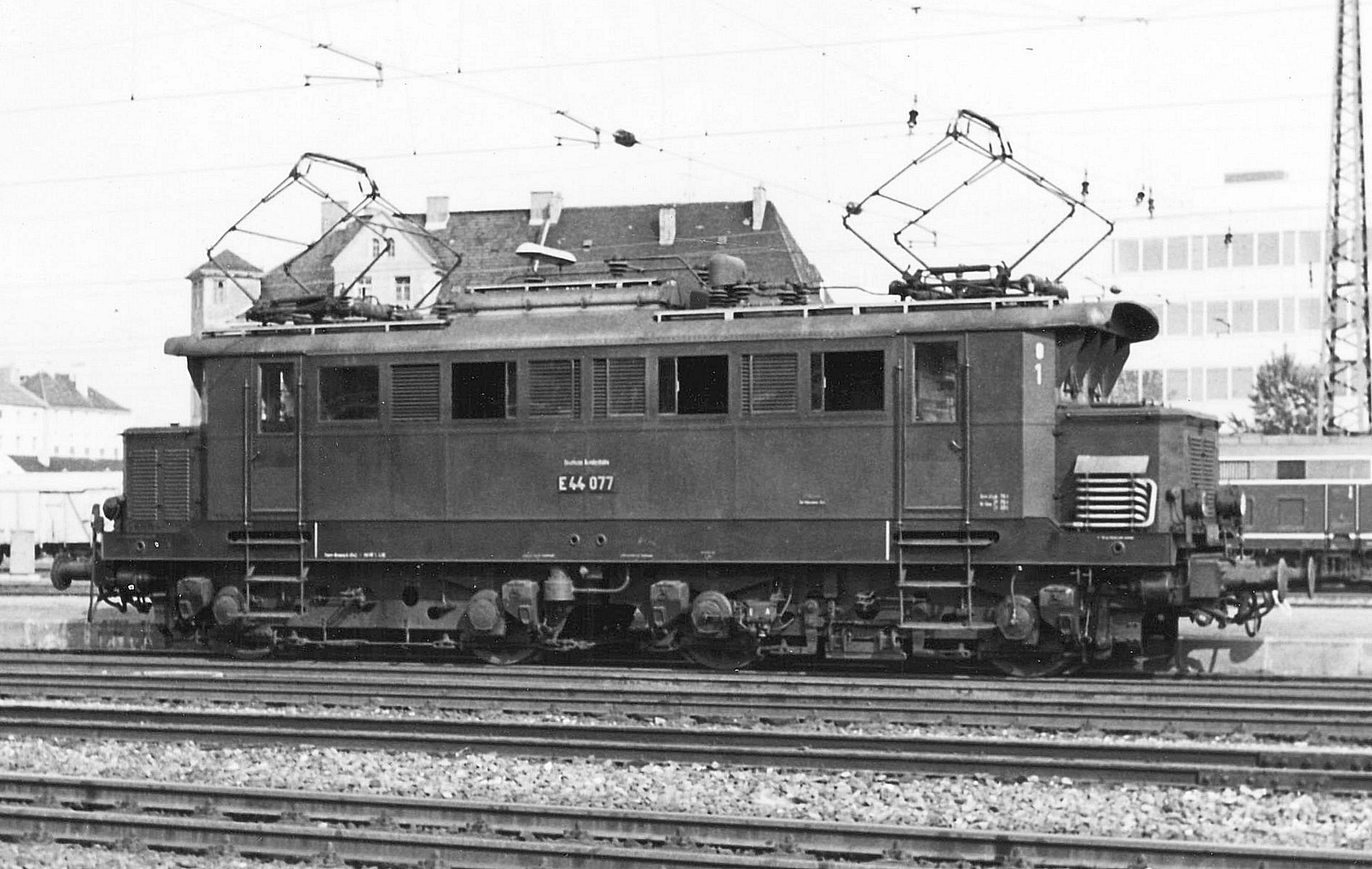
E 44 077 at München Ost, 1967

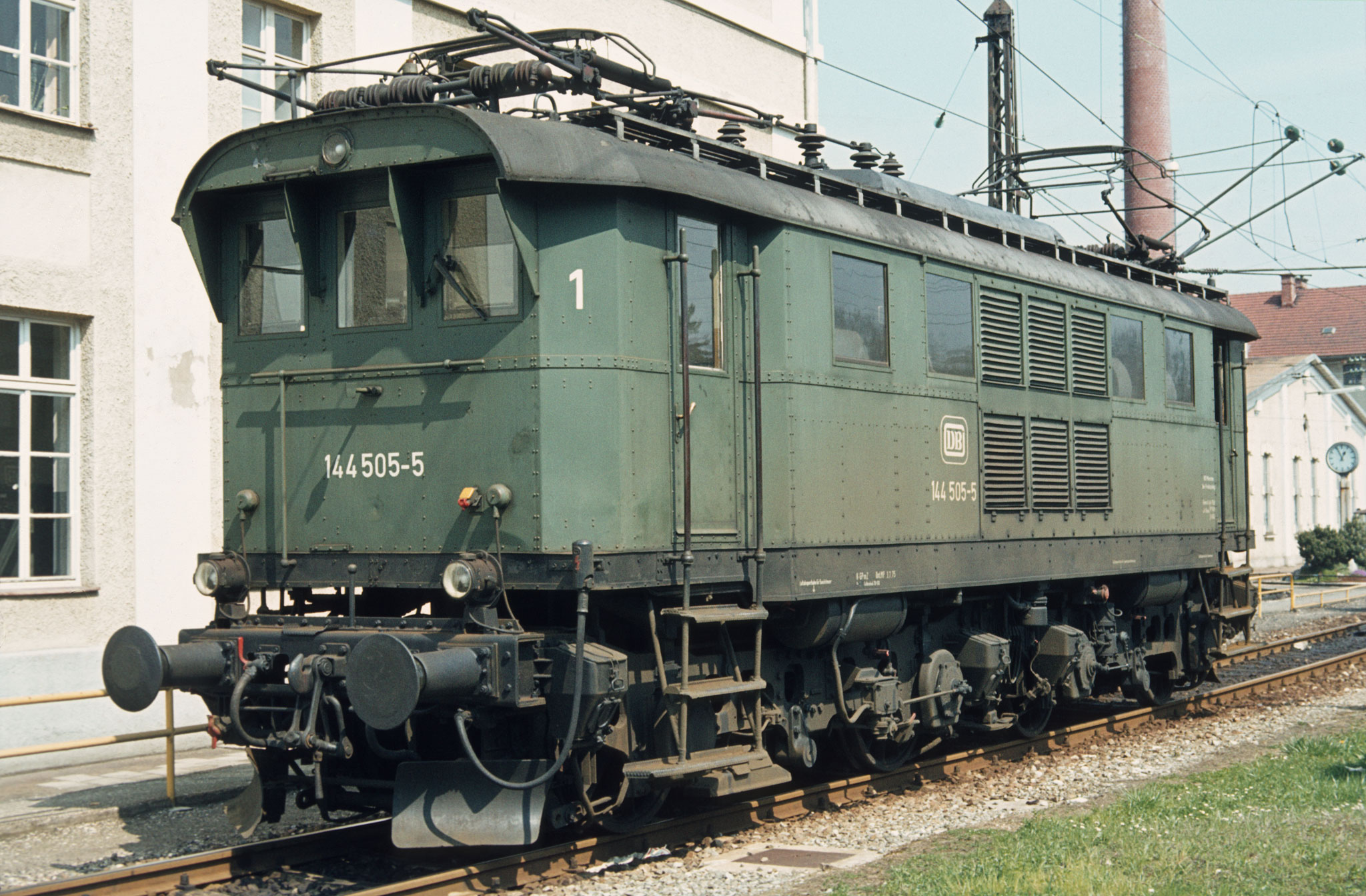
144 505 at Freilassing depot, April 1979
