= Pd4 =

Express steam locomotive of the Prussian S52 series

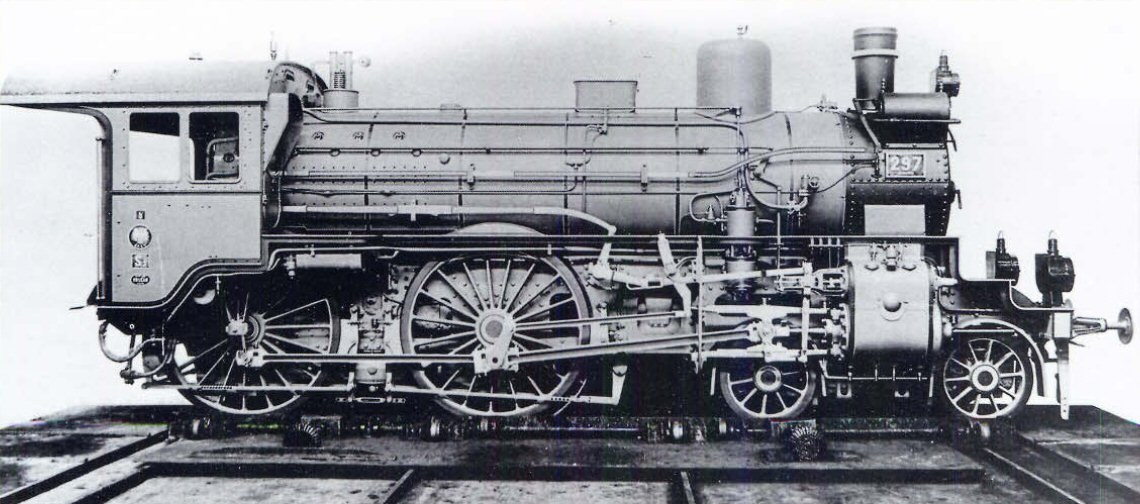
- Prussian locomotive S5²
Type and origin
- Power type: steam
- Builder: AG Vulcan Stettin and others
- Build date: 1905–1911
Specifications
- Configuration
  - UIC: 2′B n2v
- Gauge: 4 ft 8 1/2 in (1,435 mm)
- Trailing dia.: 1,000 mm (3.3 ft)
- Carrying wheel diameter: 1,980 mm (6.50 ft)
- Wheelbase: 7,600 mm (24.9 ft)
  - Drivers: 1,980 mm (6.50 ft)
- Length: 17,811 mm (58.435 ft)
- Axle load: 16.4 t (36,000 lb)
- Loco weight: 54.5 t (120,000 lb)
- Total weight: 104.6 t (231,000 lb)
- Firebox
  - Grate area: 2.27 m^{2} (24.4 sq ft)
- Boiler pressure: 12 at
- Heating surface
  - Firebox: 141.8 m^{2} (1,526 sq ft) (other data: 136.4 m^{2} (1,468 sq ft))
- Piston stroke: 600 mm (2.0 ft)
Performance figures
- Maximum speed: 100 km/h (62 mph)
- Tractive effort: 6,200 kg (13,700 lb)

Pd4 was a Polish designation for the Polish State Railways express steam locomotive of the Prussian S5² series, produced between 1905 and 1911. In German railways, it was designated as series (Br) 13^{6-8}. The locomotive had a two-cylinder compound steam engine using saturated steam. In Poland, during the interwar period, 29 locomotives of this series were in operation, and after the war, 14 were operational until 1955.

== History ==
The locomotive was constructed in 1905 at the AG Vulcan Stettin factory in Szczecin as an enhanced development of the successful and most popular Prussian express locomotive series S3 (Musterblatt III-2b). Initially referred to as verstärkte S3 (meaning strengthened S3), the new locomotive retained the same running gear and overall design from the S3 series. The main change was an enlarged boiler. From the S3 series, the proven drive scheme was also adopted – a two-cylinder compound steam engine using saturated steam. This was in contrast to the S4 and S5¹ series, which attempted to improve performance of the S3 in different ways. Due to the increased boiler efficiency, the cylinder diameters of the engine were also enlarged. The reinforced locomotive was approved as a standardized locomotive pattern (Musterblatt) III-2c.

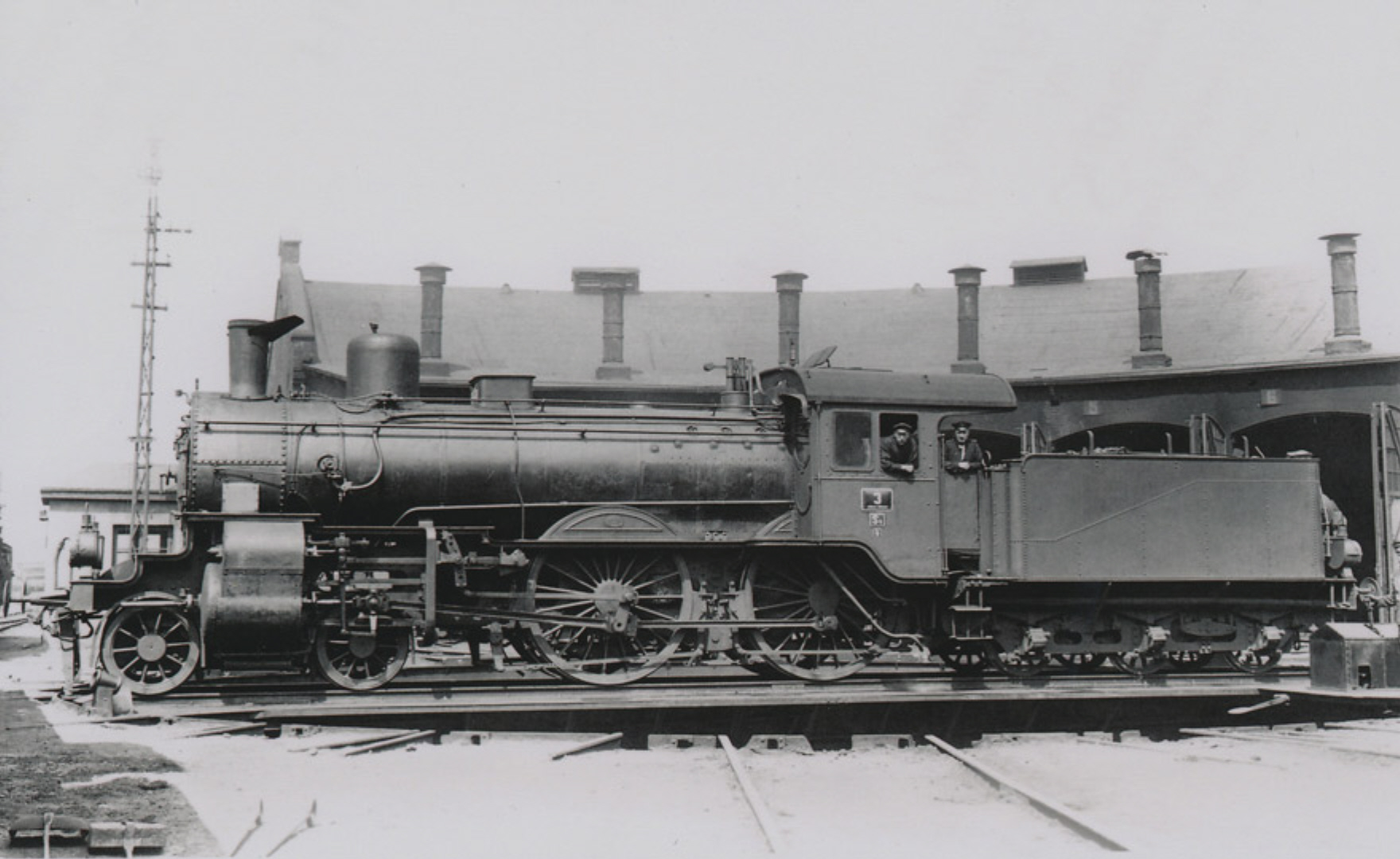
Locomotive S5.2 of the Lübeck-Büchen Railways

For the Prussian state railways, a total of 367 locomotives of type III-2c were built between 1905 and 1911 at two factories: Vulcan (186 units) and Schichau in Elbląg (181 units). Additionally, 7 locomotives of the same type were built between 1907 and 1911 at the Schwartzkopff factories in Berlin and Linke-Hofmann in Wrocław for the private Lübeck-Büchen Railways. Furthermore, another 11 similar locomotives, differing in the use of Lentz valve gear, were built between 1909 and 1913 at the Hanomag factories for the Oldenburg railways.

== Operation ==
=== Before World War I ===
Initially, in 1906, the Prussian steam locomotives of type III-2c were classified under the S3 series and were numbered in the range of 201 to 400 within respective railway administrations. Only in 1911 were they distinguished as a separate series, S5², and given numbers above 501. However, 8 locomotives under the Bydgoszcz Directorate of the Prussian state railways remained mistakenly classified as S3 series.

The S5² series locomotives were allocated to most of the Prussian state railways administrations. In 1911, the Hanover Directorate possessed the highest number with 66 units, while other directorates had between a few and 38 machines. Despite their successful design, these locomotives had to compete with more powerful four-cylinder engines like the S 7 and S 9, as well as superheated steam locomotives such as the S 6 and S 10, which entered service around the same time or even earlier. Consequently, they were soon shifted from heavy train duties on main lines to lighter express and fast trains. They served this purpose until World War I.

=== After World War I ===
After World War I, the Prussian state railways and their locomotives became part of the German railways Deutsche Reichsbahn. Initially, in a provisional plan from 1923, it was anticipated that up to 301 locomotives of the S5² series would be renumbered, but a significant portion had already been withdrawn due to the availability of newer locomotives. After the introduction of a new classification system in 1925, most of these locomotives (200 units) were classified as series (Baureihe – Br) 13^{6-8} (numbers from 13,651 to 13,850). However, their service life was short-lived, as on 1 April 1928, it was decided to retire all two-axle express locomotives as obsolete. Additionally, the German railways acquired all 11 locomotives from Oldenburg, designated as series 13^{18} (numbers from 13,851 to 13,861), which were also withdrawn between 1927 and 1928. The only German locomotive that survived longer was acquired in 1938 from the nationalized Lübeck-Büchen railway, numbered 13,001. During World War II, it served in Poland on the Łódź–Koluszki line.

After World War I, Polish State Railways operated 29 locomotives of the S5² series, designated as the Pd4 series (numbers from Pd4-1 to Pd4-29). However, Polish State Railways mistakenly classified 3 additional locomotives of the S5² series under the Pd1 series (Pd1-87, 88, and Pd1-3Dz of the Free City of Danzig railway), due to incorrect classification by the Bydgoszcz Directorate of the Prussian state railways as S3 series. In 1939, most of the Pd4 series locomotives were stationed in the Eastern Borderlands (11 in Kovel and Zdolbuniv, 2 in Sarny, additionally 4 in Dęblin and 2 in Skarżysko-Kamienna). The majority were captured by the Soviet Union after the invasion of Poland on 17 September 1939 and taken over by the Soviet railways, with only one being captured in Poland by German forces (Pd4-19). Germany captured more locomotives of this series after the attack on the Soviet Union in 1941. In total, 22 Polish locomotives of the Pd4 series were seized by Germany during the war, with 20 being given German numbers (from 13,002 to 13,021), while Pd4-7 and Pd4-28 remained unrenamed. Additionally, Germany captured two locomotives of the S5² series classified under the Pd1 series (German numbers from 13,303 and 13,338).

After World War II, Polish State Railways operated 14 locomotives designated as the Pd4 series, including two pre-war Pd13 series locomotives mistakenly classified as Pd4 (numbers Pd4-12 and 13). Furthermore, Polish State Railways still had one locomotive of the S5² series, mistakenly classified under the Pd1 series (Pd1-16, formerly Pd1-88). The Pd4 series was withdrawn from service in Poland in 1955.

A small number of S5² series locomotives also ended up in other countries after World War I: 9 in Belgium (unmarked with Belgian designations), 3 in Lithuania (following the annexation of Klaipėda to Lithuania on 10 January 1923, designated as the K5.2 series with numbers from 121 to 123), and 6 in Latvia. In Latvia, they were classified under the An series, grouping locomotives with a 2'B wheel arrangement, numbered from An-39 to An-44; they were received in February 1920 and all survived until Latvia's annexation, after which they were taken over by the Soviet railways.

Five former Polish locomotives were used after World War II by the East German Deutsche Reichsbahn and only in 1955 and 1956 at least 4 of them were returned to Poland, but they were not put back into service and were scrapped. Two former Polish locomotives were located in Austria after the war, with Pd4-8 being returned to the Soviet Union in 1948, while Pd4-28 served on the Austrian ÖBB railways until the end of 1960/1961.

== Construction ==
The S5² express steam locomotive had a 2'B axle arrangement, with a two-cylinder compound steam engine (2'B n2v). It was a direct development of the S3 locomotive design (Musterblatt III-2b). Compared to the S 3 locomotive, the boiler diameter was increased from 100 mm to 1,472 mm. The number of fire tubes was also increased from 20 to 237, and their length increased from 3,900 mm to 4,100 mm, corresponding to the increased distance between the boiler's tube plates. As a result, the heating surface of the boiler increased from 118 m² to 141 m². The boiler was raised slightly higher, with its axis located 240 mm higher at a height of 2,500 mm above the rails. The grate area, however, remained unchanged at 2.27 m².

The wheelbase of the coupled axles was 2,600 mm, and the wheelbase of the leading bogie was 2,200 mm (similar to the S 3). The leading bogie was shifted 200 mm forward, increasing the distance between the second bogie axle and the first coupled axle by that amount to 2,800 mm, and the total wheelbase to 7,600 mm. The axle load experienced a slight increase, measuring from 16 to 16.1 t for the coupled axles (other sources cite 16.4 t) and 11.2 t for the trailing axles.

The locomotive featured a two-cylinder compound engine with a high-pressure cylinder diameter of 475 mm and a low-pressure cylinder diameter of 700 mm (compared to 460 mm and 680 mm respectively in the S 3). The piston stroke was 600 mm, and the valve gear was the external Heusinger type.

Four-axle tenders of Prussian design (Musterblatt III-5f, III-5g, III-5h, III-5l) were used, with water capacities ranging from 16 m³ to 21.5 m³ and coal capacities from 4 t to 7 t. These were later designated as series pr 2’2’ T 16, T 20, T 21.5, where the number indicated the water capacity in cubic meters. The locomotive with the III-5f tender had a total length of 17,811 mm; the III-5g tender was 150 mm shorter, III-5h was 50 mm shorter, and III-5l was 60 mm shorter.

The S5² locomotive could haul trains on level track at speeds of 100 km/h with a train weight of 165 tons, at 90 km/h with 255 tons, and at 80 km/h with 340 tons (according to a 1915 specification book) or 360 tons (as per a 1924 book). The train weights at these speeds were approximately 20% higher than those for the S3 locomotives (130, 200, 280, or 325 tons respectively).

== Bibliography ==
- Rauter, Herbert; Scheingraber, Günther (1991). Preußen-Report. Band 2: Die Schnellzuglokomotiven der Gattung S 1 – S 11 (in German). Hermann Merker Verlag. ISBN 3-922404-16-2.
