= List of Prussian locomotives and railbuses =

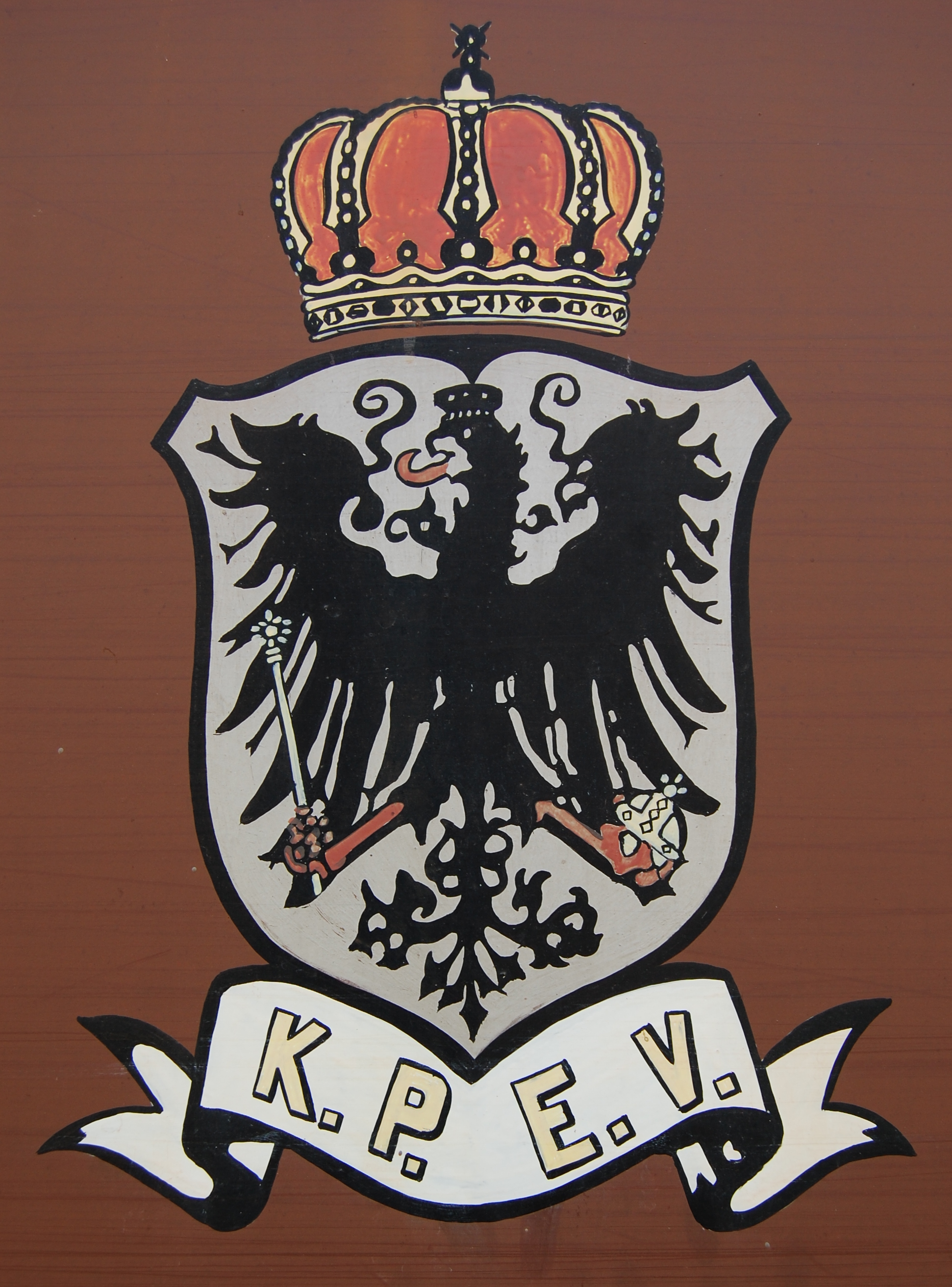
KPEV Emblem on a Prussian luggage van

This list gives an overview of the locomotives and railcars that were in the Prussian state railways. Also included are the locomotives of the Grand Duchy of Hesse State Railways (Grossherzoglich Hessischen Staatseisenbahnen) and the Prussian-Hessian Railway Company (Preussisch-Hessischen Eisenbahngemeinschaft).

== Locomotive classification ==
=== 1883 classification system ===
Up to 1 April 1883 the Prussian state railways or acquired private railways designated their locomotives with names and/or numbers. From that date the following numbering scheme was introduced into all the railway divisions.

1 to 99	uncoupled locomotives
100 to 499	four-coupled passenger train locomotives
500 to 799	four-coupled goods train locomotives
800 to 1399	six-coupled goods train locomotives
1400 to 1699	four-coupled tank locomotives
1700 to 1899	six-coupled tank locomotives
1900 to 1999	special locomotives

This scheme applied to all state railway divisions and state-managed private railways. Locomotive numbering was organised according to the above system. However a locomotive could only be identified exactly by using the divisional name and running number in combination.

Because of the increasing numbers of locomotives being procured, the classification scheme and its range of numbers were no longer sufficient. However the numbering system was not immediately replaced. As a result, numbering chaos arose as individual divisions used spare numbers and unique designations for new locomotives.

=== 1903 classification system ===
Due to the resulting confusion a new classification scheme was introduced in 1903. This was based on the systems used in the Cologne West Rhine (Coeln linksrheinisch), Elberfeld und Magdeburg railway divisions. This changeover took place between 1905 and 1908 within the divisions.

There were four main groups:

- S – Schnellzuglokomotiven = express train locomotives
- P – Personenzuglokomotiven = passenger train locomotives
- G – Güterzuglokomotiven = goods train (freight) locomotives
- T – Tenderlokomotiven = tank locomotives

An additional number represented the power delivered by the engine and together specified its group. The higher the number the more powerful the locomotive. Engines with a medium power rating were given the number 3. Saturated steam engines were given odd, and superheated steam locomotives even, numbers.

The individual locomotive groups were given a specific range of numbers, that often differentiated between two-cylinder (Zwillings-) and compound locomotives.

Because the group criteria allowed a certain degree of freedom, and because the myriad locomotives were often different, it was possible for the same type of locomotive to be placed in different groups in the different railway divisions.

From 1910 the divisions within the groups were further refined using indices. And as older locomotives were mustered out the groups became largely uniform. As a result, from that time the group designation became simultaneously a class designation. In the margins of this measure, individual locomotive types were redesignated into other groups.

From 1914 the allocation of numbers began to be no longer consistent. This situation became worse after the end of the First World War as a result of the dissolution of the railway divisions as well as the disorganised way in which locomotives were entered into service.

=== Classification system for technical and engineering purposes ===
For technical and engineering purposes, the system introduced in 1883 was not practicable. In order to describe individual types of locomotive a second system was therefore brought in.

This scheme was based on a leading fraction for the running gear ratio, capital letters to specify the primary role and type of steam used, and additional abbreviations for special features.

- H. – Heissdampf- = superheated
- S. – Schnellzug- = express train
- P. – Personenzug- = passenger train
- G. – Güterzug- = goods train
- T. – Tender- = tank
- L. – Lokomotive = locomotive
- u. – und = and
- dr. – Laufdrehgestell = carrying bogie
- dr. kr. – Krauss-Drehgestell (-Lenkgestell) = Krauss-Helmholtz bogie (pony truck)
- 3cyl. – Dreizylinder- = three-cylinder
- 4cyl. – Vierzylinder- = four-cylinder
- v. – Verbund-Triebwerk = compound drive

There were no special abbreviations for wet steam engines, tender locomotives, two-cylinder engines and simple steam expansion.

So 2/4 H. S. L. dr. meant a four-coupled, four axled, superheated express train locomotive with carrying bogie.

Further details such as 'bus' ("Omnibus") were spelt out in full. With the addition of phrases like 'with trailing axle' ("mit hinterer Laufachse") it was possible to distinguish whether a carrying wheelset was in front of or behind the coupled wheels. Following on were further descriptions in order to differentiate the different locomotives. So, for example, the name of the design company, or the name of the railway division that first procured the engine, or the fact that the locomotive was built to certain standards, were added. This classification system continued even after the introduction of the 1903 scheme. From 1910 the detail of the wheel arrangement as a fraction was replaced by a combination of figures for carrying axles and letters for coupled axles (see UIC classification).

=== Classification of electric locomotives and railbuses ===
The first locomotives built from 1908 were given the Class designation "WSL" - Wechselstrom-Schnellzug-Lokomotive (AC express train locomotive) and "WGL" - Wechselstrom-Güterzug-Lokomotive (AC goods train locomotive) as well as operating numbers: from 10201 for the goods train engines and 10501 for the expresses. In addition the name of the railway division followed. Because the system was no longer adequate for the locomotives ordered from 1911 a system was introduced similar to the steam engine classification scheme.

It comprised the class designations:

- ES – Schnellzuglokomotiven = express train locomotives (operating numbers starting at 1)
- EP – Personenzuglokomotiven = passenger train locomotives (operating numbers starting at 201)
- EG – Güterzuglokomotiven = goods train locomotives (operating numbers starting at 501)
- EV – Verschiebelokomotiven = pusher locomotives (operating numbers starting at 1)

Multiple locomotives were designated with lower case letters.

The railbuses were initially only given an operating number. From 1910 type letters were introduced.

- AT – Akkumulatortriebwagen = accumulator railbus (operating numbers starting at 201), later only "A"
- DT – Dampftriebwagen = steam railbus (operating numbers starting at 1)
- VT – Verbrennungsmotortriebwagen = combustion engine railbus (operating numbers starting at 1)
- ET – Elektrotriebwagen = electric railbus (various numbering systems)

There were far more locomotives than available 4-digit numbers; consequently each division had its own list. Locomotives transferred between divisions would be renumbered. The 22 divisions were:

- Altona [Hamburg]
- Berlin
- Breslau
- Bromberg
- Cassel
- Danzig
- Elberfeld
- Erfurt
- Essen
- Frankfurt
- Halle
- Hannover
- Kattowitz
- Köln [Cologne]
- Königsberg
- Magdeburg
- Mainz
- Münster
- Osten
- Posen
- Saarbrücken
- Stettin

The operating numbers were always given together with their originating railway division in order to avoid any possible confusion.

== Remarks about the tables ==
The lists give an overview of the locomotives procured by the Prussian state railways (Preussische(n) Staatseisenbahnen) from 1880 or as standard types thereafter.

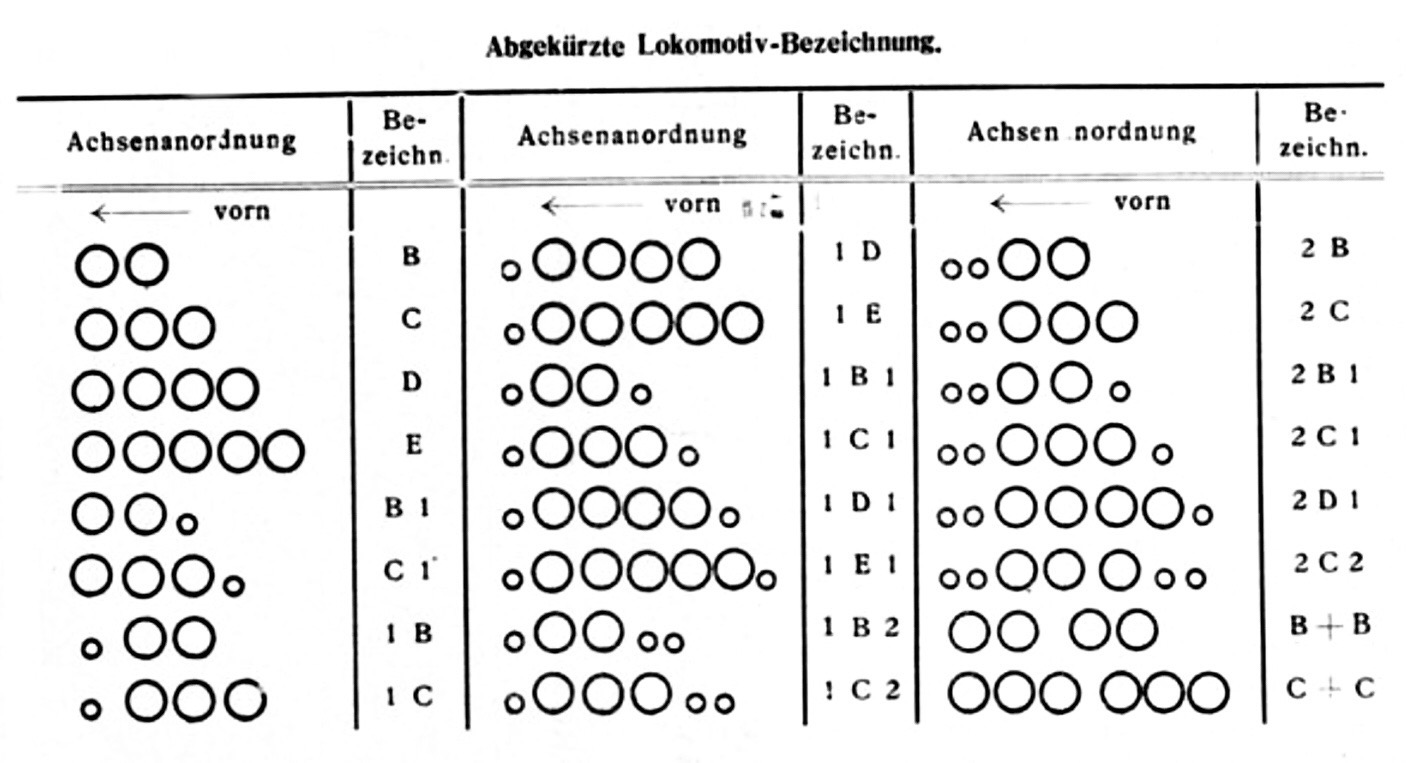
Explanation of axle arrangement (Type)

== Steam locomotives ==
=== Express train locomotives ===
Class	Number range	DRG number(s)	Quantity	Year(s) Built	Type	Remarks
S 1	1–100		14	1884–1887	1B n2v	Hanover type
S 1	1–100	(12 7001 – 7004)	260	1885–1898	1B n2	Standard type based on to M III-2; 3 units, classed as P 3
S 2	101–200		2	1890	2′B n2v	Experimental loco, Hannover
S 2	101–200		2	1891	2′B n2	Experimental loco, Erfurt variant
S 2	101–200		2	1891	2′B n2v	Experimental loco, Erfurt variant
S 2	101–200		148	1892–1893	2′B n2	Standard type based on M III-2a, copy of the Erfurt experimental loco
S 2	101–200		1	1892	2′B n2	Experimental loco with Lentz flue boiler
S 3	201–400	13 002 – 028	1027	1893–1903	2′B n2v	Standard type based on M III-2b; 4 units with Pielock water separator (Dampftrockner), classified S 4 for a time
S 3	201–400	13 001	(26)	(1904–1908)	2′B n2v	Rebuild of S 2 based on M III-2a with compound system
S 4	401–500		1	1898	2′B h2	Superheated trials engine with fire tube superheater
S 4	401–500		2	1899–1900	2′B h2	Superheated trials engine with smokebox superheater
S 4	401–500	13 501 – 504	104	1898–1909	2′B h2	Standard type based on M XIV-2
S 5.1	501–600		1	1894	2′B n4v	Experimental locomotive with four-cylinder compound engine, of the same type as for the Chemins de fer du Nord
S 5.1	501–600		17	1900–1903	2′B n4v	Hannover variant
S 5.1	501–600		22	1902–1903	2′B n4v	Grafenstaden variant
S 5^{2}	501–600	13 651 – 850	367	1905–1911	2′B n2v	Standard type based on M III-2b, so-called "strengthened S 3"; classified S 3 until 1910
S 6	601–700	13 1001 – 1286	584	1906–1913	2′B h2	Standard type based on M XIV-2a
S 7	701–800		159	1902–1906	2′B1′ n4v	Standard type based on M III-2f, Hanover variant; one with Pielock water separator, classified S 8 for a time
S 7	701–800		79	1902–1905	2′B1′ n4v	Grafenstaden variant, delivered in 3 versions
S 8	801–900	14 001 – 002	(2)	(1913–1914)	2′B1′ h4v	Rebuilt S 9 based on M III-2g with superheater
S 9 (Experimental)	901–1000		2	1904	2′B2′ n3v	Fast Wittfeld-Kuhn trials locomotive
S 9	901–1000	14 031	99	1908–1910	2′B1′ n4v	Standard type based on M III-2g, 2 prototypes initially classified as S 7
S 10	1001–1100	17 001 – 135	202	1910–1914	2′C h4	Standard type based on M XIV-2b, 2 prototypes initially classified as S 8
S 10^{1}	1101–1200	17 1001 – 1123, 17 1145 – 1153	145	1911–1914	2′C h4v	Standard type based on M XIV-2c^{1}, 1911 version
S 10^{1}	1101–1200	17 1124 – 1144, 17 1154 – 1209	92	1914–1916	2′C h4v	Standard type based on M XIV-2c^{2}, 1914 version
S 10^{2}	1201–1300	17 201 – 296	124	1914–1916	2′C h3	Standard type based on M XIV-2d; like the S 10, only with 3 cylinders
S 11	1301–1307		7	1918	1′C2′ h4v	kkStB 310.300; 10 ordered from the kkStB, 7 taken over by Prussia, handed to Poland in 1922

=== Passenger train locomotives ===
Class	Number range	DRG number(s)	Quantity	Year(s) Built	Type	Remarks
P 1	1501 –1550		56	1885–1891	1′B n2	Standard type based on M III-1b, so-called "newer Ruhr-Sieg type"; 24 units classified as P 2
P 2	1551–1600		166	1877–1884	1B n2	Standard type based on M 15, with inside valve gear; 7 units classified as P 3
P 2	1551–1600		76	1878–1883	1B n2	Standard type based on M 16, with outside valve gear; 17 units classified as P 1
P 2	1551–1600		5	1886	2′B n2	Cöln linksreheinisch Division variant
P 3	1601–1700		3	1891	2′B n2v	So-called "Mosel railway locomotives"; like the P 3^{2}, only with bogie
P 3^{1}	1601–1700	(34 7001 – 7012)	685	1885–1899	1B n2	Standard type based on M III-1
P 3^{2}	1701–1800	(34 7101 – 7134)	131	1887–1903	1B n2v	Standard type based on M III-1a
P 4^{1}	1801–1900		2	1891	2′B n2	Experimental locomotive, Erfurt variant
P 4^{1}	1801–1900		55	1891–1892	2′B n2	Standard type based on M III-1c, copy of the Erfurt experimental locomotive
P 4^{1}	1801–1900	36 7001 – 7009	424	1893–1901	2′B n2	Standard type based on M III-1d
P 4^{1}	1801–1900		1	1898	2′B h2	Superheated experimental locomotive with fire tube superheater
P 4^{2}	1901–2000		2	1891	2′B n2v	Experimental locomotive, Erfurt variant
P 4^{2}	1901–2000	36 002 – 438	707	1898–1910	2′B n2v	Standard type based on M III-1c
P 4^{2}	1901–2000	36 001	(5)	(1907)	2′B n2v	P 4^{1} rebuilt to compound operation, based on M III-c
P 6	2101–2300	37 001 – 160	272	1901–1910	1′C h2	Standard type based on M XIV-1; 37 161 - 163 identical engines of the former Royal Military Railway
P 7	2301–2400		18	1899–1902	2′C n4v	Grafenstaden variant
P 8	2401–2800	38 1001 – 1572, 38 1576 – 1749, 38 1752 – 1790, 38 1793 – 2022, 38 2024 – 2025, 38 2027 – 2118, 38 2120 – 3389, 38 3395 – 3673, 38 3677 – 3792, 38 3951 – 4000	3498	1906–1923	2′C h2	Standard type based on M XIV-1a
(P 10)	(from 2801)	39 001–- 260	260	1922–1925	1′D1′ h3	

=== Goods train locomotives ===
Class	Number range	DRG number(s)	Quantity	Year(s) Built	Type	Remarks
G 1	3001–3050		49	1887–1897	B n2	Standard type based on M III-3g
G 2	3051–3100		45	1888–1901	B1 n2	Standard type based on M III-3b; 24 units classified as P 2, 2 units classified as P 3
G 3	3101–3600	53 7001 – 7157	2219	1877–1901	C n2	Standard type based on M III-3 (old M 13 and M 14); loco with 10 kp/cm² boiler pressure should be classified as G 3, with 12 kp/cm² as G 4^{1}
G 4^{1}	3601–3800	53 7601 – 7617	2219	1877–1901	C n2	Standard type based on M III-3 (old M 13 and M 14); loco with 10 kp/cm² boiler pressure should be classified as G 3, with 12 kp/cm² as G 4^{1}
G 4^{2}	3801–3900	53 001 – 024	774	1882–1903	C n2v	Standard type based on M III-3a, compounded variant of the G 3
G 4^{3}	3901–4000	53 301 – 327	63	1903–1907	C n2v	Standard type based on M III-3o, Union variant
G 5^{1}	4001–4400	54 001 – 071	268	1892–1902	1′C n2	Standard type based on M III-3c, with Allan valve gear and Adams axle.
G 5^{2}	4001–4400	54 201 – 323, 54 325 – 342, 54 345 – 352, 54 354 – 367	499	1896–1901	1′C n2v	Standard type based on M III-3h, compounded variant of the G 5^{1}
G 5^{3}	4001–4400	54 601 – 671	206	1903–1906	1′C n2	Standard type based on M III-3l, two-cylinder variant of the G 5^{4}
G 5^{4}	4001–4400	54 801 – 981, 54 985 – 1079, 54 1083 – 1084	753	1901–1910	1′C n2v 1′C h2v	Standard type based on M III-3k, with Walschaerts valve gear and Krauss-Helmholtz bogie
G 5^{5}	4001–4400	54 1080 – 1082, 54 1085 – 1092	20	1910	1′C n2v	Standard type based on M III-3n; like the G 5^{4}, but with Adams axle
G 7^{1}	4401–4600	55 001 – 660	1205	1893–1917	D n2	Standard type based on M III-3d
G 7^{2}	4601–4800	55 702 – 55 1392	1646	1895–1911	D n2v	Standard type based on M III-3i, compounded variant of the G7^{1}
G 7^{3}	4601–4800	55 701, 56 001 – 005	85	1893–1917	1′D n2v	Standard type based on M III-3e
G 8	4801–5000	55 1601 – 2256	1054	1902–1913	D h2	Standard type based on M XIV-3
G 8^{1}	4801–5000, 5151–5400	55 2501 – 2945, 55 2947 – 3337, 55 3341 – 3366, 55 3368 – 4274, 55 4280 – 4284, 55 4286 – 5622	4958	1913–1921	D h2	Standard type based on M XIV-3b
G 8^{2}		56 2001 – 2275, 56 2281 – 2485, 56 2551 – 2916	846	1919–1928	1′D h2	
G 8^{3}		56 101 – 185	85	1919–1920	1′D h3	
G 9 (Mallet)	5001–5150		27	1893–1898	B′B n4v	Standard type based on M III-3f, articulated Mallet locomotive
G 9	5001–5150	55 2301 – 2433	200	1908–1911	D n2	Standard type based on M III-3m, 36 units, rebuilt in 1923/24 into D h2
G 10	5401–5550	57 1001 – 1123, 57 1125 – 2725, 57 2892 – 3101	2615	1910–1924	E h2	Standard type based on XIV-3a
G 12 (CFOA)	5551–5555	58 1001	5	1917	1′E h3	15 units, ordered by the CFOA (Chemin de Fer Ottomane Anatole), 5 units taken over by Prussia
G 12	from 5551	58 1002 – 2143	1168	1917–1922	1′E h3	Standard type based on M XIV-3d, 10 units, sold to Baden in 1920
G 12^{1}	from 5551	58 001 – 015	21	1915–1917	1'E h3	Standard type based on M XIV-3c

=== Tank locomotives ===
Class	Number range	DRG number(s)	Quantity	Year(s) Built	Type	Remarks
T 0	6001–6040		10	1880, 1883	1A n2t 1A n2vt	Various types
T 1	6001–6040	(98 7021)	76	1882–1886	B n2(v)t	Various types
T 2	6041–6100	(88 7001, 7002, 7601)	67	1884–1889	B n2t	Standard type
T 2 / T 4	6041–6100		70	1881–1882	1B n2t	1st Berlin type
T 2^{1}	6041–6100		18	1884	B1 n2t	
T 2 / T 3 / T 4	6041–6100		5	1895, 1902	B1 n2t	Standard type
T 3	6100–6400	89 7001 – 7511	1804	1881–1910	C n2t	
T 4	6401–6600	(70 7001)	14	1884–1888	1B n2t	Magdeberg variant
T 4	6401–6600		24	1885–1890	1′B n2t	Hanover variant
T 4	6401–6600	(69 7001 – 7002; 70 7002 – 7004; 70 7015 – 7016)	78	1888–1893	1B n2t	2nd Berlin type
T 4^{1}	6401–6600	(70 7005 – 7014, 70 7017 – 7033; 70 7036 – 7037)	177	1890–1898	1B n2t	Standard type T 4
T 4^{2}	6401–6600	(69 7003)	63	1889–1897	B1 n2t	
T 4^{3}	6401–6600	(70 7034, 7035)	3	1898	1′B n2t	
T 5^{1}	6601–6700	71 001 – 026	309	1895–1905	1′B1′ n2t	
T 5^{2}	6601–6700	72 001 – 002	36	1899–1900	2′B n2t, 2′B h2t	
T 6	6701–6800		12	1902	1′C1′ n3t, 1′C1′ n2t	
T 7	6801–7000	89 7801 – 7869	374	1876–1900	C n2	
T 8	7001–7050	89 001 – 078	100	1906–1909	C h2t	
T 9 Elberfeld	7051–7400	90 116 (90 351 – 363)	37	1891–1900	C1′ n2t	
T 9 Langenschwalbach	7051–7400	90 232, 233	19	1892–1895	C1′ n2t	
T 9^{1}	7051–7400	90 001 – 021, 90 024 – 115, 90 117 – 122, 90 125 – 231	425	1893–1909	C1′ n2t	Several locos wrongly classified as 91.0–1 (T 9.2) and 91.3 (T 9.3)
T 9^{2}	7051–7400	91 001 – 087, 91 090 – 108, 91 115	235	1892–1901	1′C n2t	Several locos wrongly classified as 90.0–2 (T 9.1)
T 9^{3}	7051–7400	91 303 – 1805	2060	1902–1922	1′C n2t	
T 10	7401–7500	76 001 – 011	12	1909	2′C h2t	
T 11	7501–7700	74 001 – 358	470	1903–1910	1′C n2t, 1′C h2t	
T 12	7701–7900; Berlin 8201–8500; Berlin 8701–8754	74 401 – 543, 74 545 – 1310	974	1902–1916	1′C h2t	
T 13 Hagans	7901–8000	(92 501 – 505)	29	1899–1902	D n2t	
T 13	7901–8000	92 501 – 584, 92 589 – 605, 92 608 – 731, 92 739 – 909, 92 914 – 954, 92 1001 – 1072	585	1899–1922	D n2t	
(T 13^{1})	7901–8000	92 405 – 413	9	1921, 1922	D h2t	
T 14 (Experimental)	Berlin 8501		1	1913	1′D1′ h2t	
T 14	8501–8700	93 001 – 417	547	1913–1918	1′D1′ h2t, 1′D1′ h3t	
T 14^{1}	8501–8700; Berlin 8901–9105	93 501 – 794, 93 815 – 831, 93 851 – 1017	729	1918–1924	1′D1′ h2t	93 1018 – 1261 procured by the DRG
T 15	8001–8100	(94 7001 – 7022)	93	1897–1905	E n2t	
T 16 (Experimental)	Erfurt 1980		1	1904	2′C2′ h4vt	Experimental locomotive
T 16	8101–8200	94 201 – 464, 94 468 – 490; 94 501	343	1905–1913	E h2t	
T 16^{1}	8101–8200; Essen 8201–8400; Essen 8601–8809	94 502 – 1377, 94 1501 – 1584	1236	1913–1924	E h2t	94 1585 – 1740 procured by the DRG
T 18	8401–8500; Essen 8901–8960	78 001 – 092, 78 094 – 145, 78 166 – 282, 78 351 – 401	460	1912–1927	2′C2′ h2t	78 402 – 528 procured by the DRG
(T 20)	(9201–9300)	95 001 – 045	45	1922–1924	1′E1′ h2t	Delivery ran into the DRG era
T 26	9001–9050	97 001 – 030	35	1902–1920	C1′ n2(4)zt	Rack railway locomotive
T 28	Erfurt 9101	97 401	1	1922	1′D1′ h2(4v)zt	Rack railway locomotive

=== Narrow gauge locomotives ===
Class	Number range	DRG number(s)	Quantity	Year(s) Built	Type	Remarks
Metre gauge
T 31	Erfurt 1–4		4	1879–1893	C n2t	Acquired with the Felda Railway
T 31	Erfurt 5, 7–8	(99 7101)	3	1887	C n2t	Acquired with the Hildburghausen-Heldburg-Lindenau Railway
T 31^{1}	Erfurt 6	99 7102	2	1875–1899	C n2t	Acquired with the Eisfeld-Unterneubrunn Railway
T 32	Erfurt 41		1	1897	C n2t	Acquired with the Eisfeld-Unterneubrunn Railway; also classified as the T 29 and T 30
T 33	Erfurt 51–63	99 031 – 032, 99 041 – 045, 99 051 – 052, 99 061 – 063	13	1908–1914	C n2t	Also classified as T 30
T 34	Erfurt 71		1	1899	C1′ n2t	Also classified as T 28 and T 29
T 35	Erfurt 81	(99 141)	1	1902	D n2t	Also classified as T 30, T 31 und T 32
(T 40)	Erfurt 91–93	99 181 – 183	3	1923	E h2t	Procurement and delivery by the DRG
785 mm (2 ft 6 29/32 in)
T 31	Kattowitz 1–9		9	1877–1880	C n2t	Acquired with the Upper Silesian Narrow Gauge Railway
T 31^{1}	Kattowitz 10–36	(99 7401 – 7404, 99 7411 – 7413)	27	1884–1899	C n2t	Acquired with the Upper Silesian Narrow Gauge Railway
T 36	Kattowitz 101–104		4	1897–1901	CB′ n2t	
T 37	Kattowitz 111–130	99 401 – 408	20	1902–1912	D n2t	
T 38	Kattowitz 211–237	99 411 – 420	27	1914–1919	D h2t	
T 39	Oppeln 251–257	99 431 – 435	7 (+6)	1919–1926	E h2t	99 441 – 446 DRG copies

== Electric locomotives ==
Class/No(s).	DRG number(s)	Quantity	Year(s) Built	Type	Remarks
ES 1 to ES 3	E 00 02	3	1911	2′B1′	
ES 4		1	1912	1′D1′	
ES 5		1	1913	1′C1′	
ES 6		1	1914	1′C1′	
ES 9 to ES 19	E 01 09 – E 01 19	11	1914–1922	1′C1′	
(ES 51 to ES 57)	E 06 01 – E 06 07	7	1924–1926	2′C2′	Procured by the DRG
EP 201		1	1912	1′D1′	Originally classified as EG 501
EP 202 to EP 208	E 30 02 – E 30 08	7	1915	1′C1′	
EP 209/210 and EP 211/212	E 49 00	2	1922	2′B+B1′	
(EP 213 and EP 214)	E 42 13, E 42 14	2	1924	B′B′	Procured by the DRG
(EP 215 to EP 219)	E 42 15 – E 42 19	5	1924–1925	B′B′	Procured by the DRG
EP 235	E 50 35	1	1917	2′D1′	
EP 236 to 246	E 50 36 – E 50 46	11	1923–1924	2′D1′	
EP 247 to 252	E 50 47 – E 50 52	6	1923–1924	2′D1′	
EG 502 to EG 505	E 70 02 – E 70 05	4	1911	D	
EG 506	E 70 06	1	1911	D	
EG 507 and EG 508	E 70 07, E 70 08	2	1913	D	
EG 509/510		1	1911	1′B + B1′	
EG 511 to EG 537	E 71 11 – E 71 37	27	1914–1922	B′B′	
EG 538abc to EG 549abc	E 91 38 – E 91 49	12	1915	B+B+B	
EG 551/552 to EG 569/570	E 90 51 – E 90 60	10	1919–1923	C+C	
EG 571ab to EG 579ab	E 92 71 – E 92 79	9	1923–1925	Co+Co	
(EG 581 to EG 594)	E 91 81 – E 91 94	14	1925–1926	C′C′	Ordered by the DRG
(EG 701 to EG 725)	E 77 51 – E 77 75	25	1924–1926	(1B)(B1)	Ordered by the DRG
EV 1/2	E 73 03	1	1911	Bo+Bo	
EV 3/4		1	1913	Bo+Bo	
EV 5^{I}		1	1910	A1A	
EV 5^{II}	E 73 05	1	1923	Bo′Bo′	
EV 6	E 73 06	1	1926	Bo′Bo′	Ordered by the DRG
EB 1 to EB 3		3	1914	B	

== Railbuses ==
Class/No(s).	DRG number(s)	Quantity	Year(s) Built	Type	Remarks
Steam Railcars
DT 1		1	1903	A1 nt2	
DT 2		2	1905	(1A)1 n2v	
DT 3		3	1905	A1 n2v	
Electric Railcars
2051 and 2052			1903	(A1A) 3′	
501 Berlin to 532 Berlin			1903–1912	Bo′2′	Berlin City Railway
551/552 Altona to 669/670 Altona	1501 a/b – 1560 a/b		1905–1907	Bo′1 + 1(1A) and Bo′1 + 1 2′	Hamburg-Altona City and Suburban Railway
671/672 Altona to 719/720 Altona	1561 a/b – 1575 a/b		1909	Bo′1 + 1 2′	Hamburg-Altona City and Suburb Railway
721/722 Altona to 829/830 Altona	1576 a/b – 1588 a/b		1910–1913	Bo′1 + 1 2′	Hamburg-Altona City and Suburban Railway
501 Breslau to 506 Breslau	ET 87 01 – ET 87 05		1914, 1915	2′ 1 + B′1 + 1 2′	
507 Breslau to 510 Breslau	ET 88 01 – ET 88 04		1923	(A1)(1A)	
(Experimental Berlin A to F)	3001 Berlin – 3022e Berlin, 6001 Berlin – 6030 Berlin		1920	Bo′2′+2+2+2+2′Bo', Bo′2′2′2′2′Bo′	Experimental trains for the Berlin S-Bahn, ordered by the DRG
Battery Railcars
A 1	201 – 205		1907	A 1 A	Old class AT 1/06
AT 2			1907	(1A)Bo′, Bo′Bo′	
AT 2	223/224 – 233/234, 241/242 – 353/354		1908–1911	1A+A1, 2A+A2	Wittfeld type, old class AT 3/11 and AT 3/06
A 3	355/356 – 489/490		1910–1912	2A+A2	Wittfeld type, old class AT 3/09 and AT 3/11
A 4	491/492 – 531/532, 537/538 – 545/546, 555/556 – 563/564, 579/580		1913	2A+A2	Wittfeld type, old class AT 3/13
A 5	533/534 + 535/536		1913, 1914	3+Bo+3	Wittfeld type, old class AT 3/12
A 6	547/548 – 553/554, 565/566 – 567/568		1913, 1914	3+Bo+3	
AT 569 - 578			1916	1A+1A+A1	
Internal Combustion Railcars
Experimental Railbus VT30			1907	(1A)(A1)	
VT 1 to VT 20			1909	2′Bo′	
VT 101 to VT 103			1914	3′B′	

== See also ==
- History of rail transport in Germany
- Länderbahnen
- Kingdom of Prussia
- Krauss Locomotive Works
- Prussian state railways
- UIC classification
