= Triptis–Marxgrün railway =

Railway line in Germany

Coordinates: 50°23′04″N 11°41′27″E

Triptis–Unterlemnitz–Blankenstein–Marxgrün
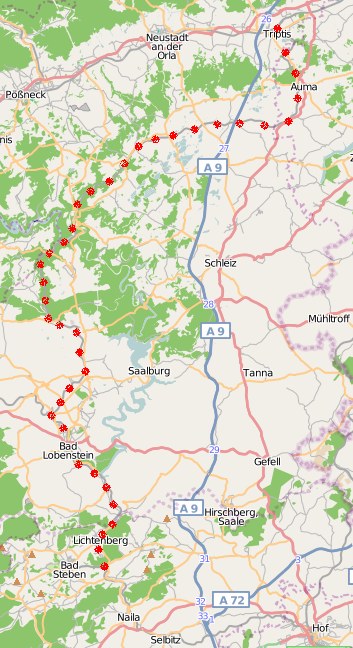

Overview
- Line number: 6683

Service
- Route number: 556

Technical
- Line length: 68.76 km (42.73 mi)
- Track gauge: 1,435 mm (4 ft 8 1/2 in)

The Triptis–Marxgrün railway is a branch line in Germany that runs through the states of Thuringia and Bavaria, and which was originally built and operated by the Prussian state railways. It ran from Triptis via Ziegenrück, Bad Lobenstein and Blankenstein to Marxgrün. The only section still in service today is the stretch of line between Ebersdorf-Friesau and Blankenstein. The Thuringian section is also called the Oberlandbahn ("Oberland railway"); the Bavarian section the Höllentalbahn ("Hell Valley Railway").

== History ==
=== Planning and construction ===
The legal basis for the construction of the Höllental Railway was a state treaty between the German states of Bavaria, Reuss Junior Line and Prussia of 30 January 1897. From 1908 there was a through route from Bavaria to Saalfeld via the Hockeroda–Unterlemnitz railway.

Opening dates:

- Triptis–Ziegenrück: 17 December 1894
- Ziegenrück–Unterlemnitz–Lobenstein (Thür.): 16 September 1895
- Lobenstein (Thür.)–Lemnitzhammer Güterbahnhof (Gbf): 1 December 1896
- Lemnitzhammer Gbf–Blankenstein (Saale): 15 July 1897
- Blankenstein (Saale)–Marxgrün: 15 August 1901

The boundary between the jurisdiction of the Royal Bavarian State Railways and the Prussian state railways crossed the line shortly before the station at Marxgrün at kilometre post 68.24, calculated from the original start of the route in Triptis. This spot also marked the subsequent boundary between the Reichsbahn divisions of Erfurt and Regensburg.

=== Second World War ===
During the Second World War, the Triptis–Marxgrün railway was used as an alternative route for north–south traffic, because it was a long way from centres of population that were vulnerable to bombing raids. In order to increase the capacity of the line, a further two crossing stations were established during the war. Even Adolf Hitler's special train regularly used this route on the way from Berlin to Berchtesgaden. During the day the train was stored in the Kesselfels tunnel to protect it from bombing, because for safety reasons the train only ran at night. During these times no other traffic moved on the line.

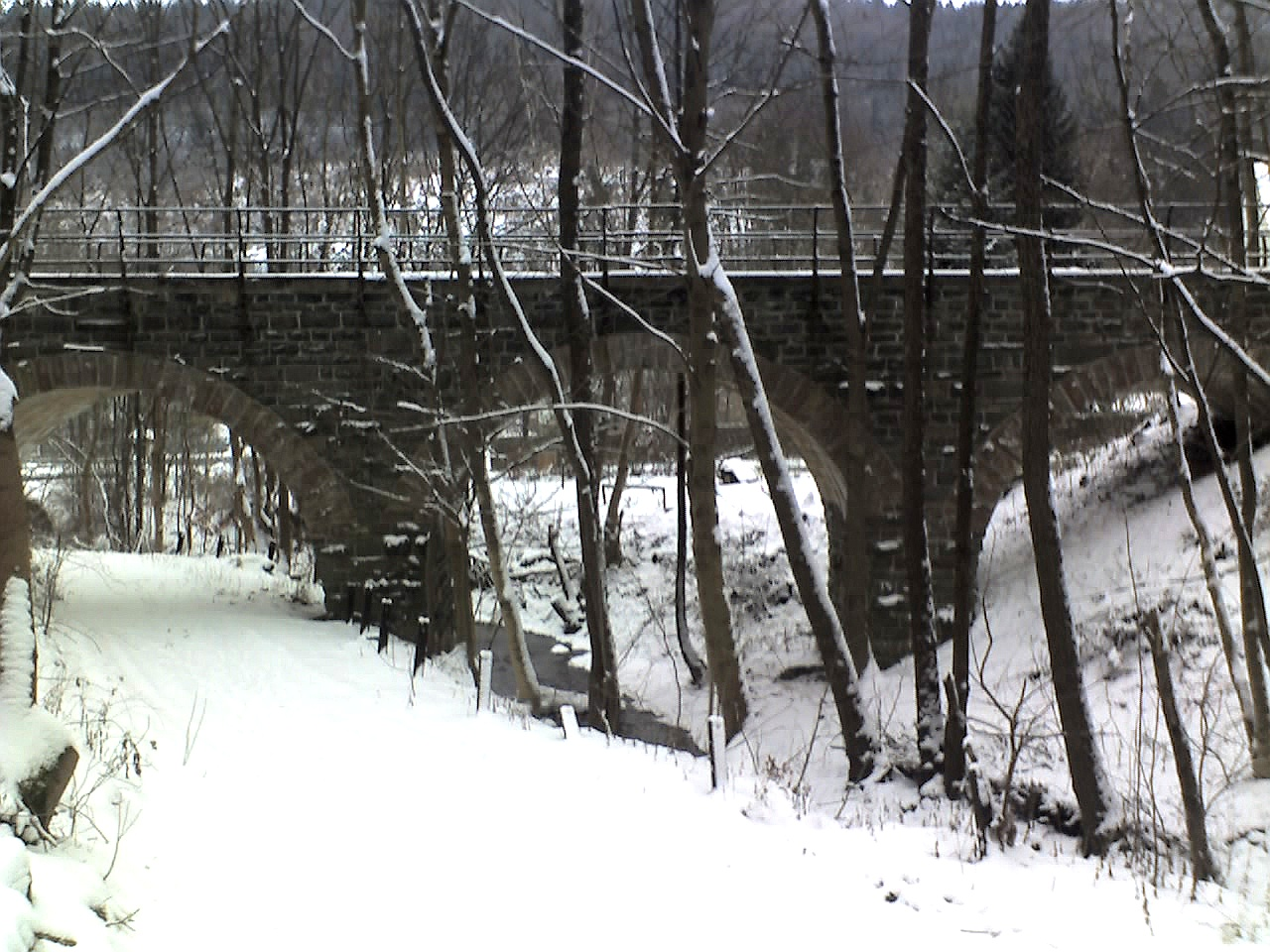
Border bridge between the then GDR and FRG

=== Division of Germany ===
After the occupation of Thuringia by the Red Army in June 1945 the Bavarian-Thuringian state border became the demarcation line between the American and Soviet-occupied zones in Germany. As a result, railway traffic across the border ceased on 3 June 1945. The boundary between the two railway divisions was later adjusted to align with the state border which later became the Inner German Border.

==== Triptis–Blankenstein in Thuringia ====
The northern section of the line continued to be important for passenger and goods services into the 1990s. In the timetable the route was listed as KBS 534 Triptis–Lobenstein (Thür). The rest of the line to Blankenstein was part of route no. KBS 565 Saalfeld–Lobenstein (Thür)–Blankenstein.

There were hardly ever any through trains between Triptis or Saalfeld and Blankenstein in GDR times. The station of Blankenstein ended up in the out-of-bounds area immediately adjacent to the so-called Staatsgrenze West (i.e. Inner German Border), which required police checks to be carried out on all passengers. For that reason, special trains ran between Lobenstein and Blankenstein. This way of operating continued until the political changes or Wende in East Germany in 1990.

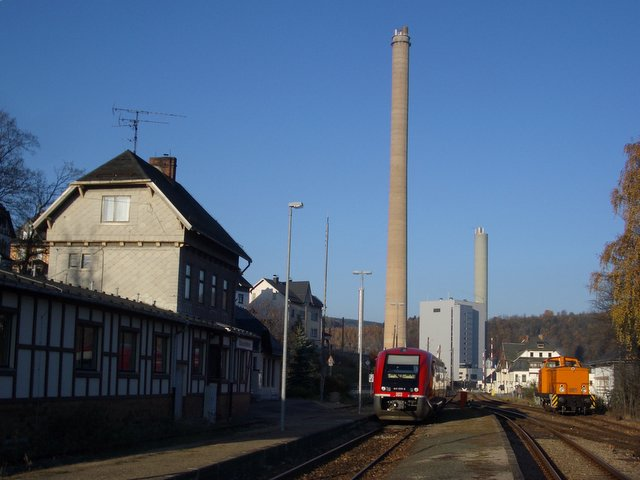
Regionalbahn in Blankenstein (2005)

On 24 May 1998 the state of Thuringia withdrew passenger services between Triptis and Unterlemnitz. Since then only the section from Unterlemnitz to Blankenstein has been worked; by Regionalbahn trains on the Saalfeld–Blankenstein route. At the end of that year, goods traffic between Triptis and Ebersdorf-Friesau also ceased. From that time on Ebersdorf-Friesau station, with its siding to a large sawmill, was served from Saalfeld. That meant the line between Triptis and Lobenstein was de facto empty of traffic. Shortly before its closure, however, several heavy load transporters passed through to the transformer station of Remptendorf. On 1 January 2005 this section was closed, however the tracks have yet to be lifted.

The German Regional Railway (Deutsche Regionaleisenbahn or DRE) has rented the closed section between Triptis and Ebersdorf-Friesau, initially until 31 December 2009 with the aim of preserving the trackbed. An important step in this regard was the decision of the Federal Administrative Court in Leipzig over an urgent appeal by the DRE, that the railway overbridge over the A9 motorway (BAB 9) at Mossbach would not be torn down as part of the widening of that motorway. However the reactivation of the line will not be supported by the Thuringian state parliament, because "the Remptendorf–Triptis section … is not important for transportation". In spite of that, at the end of October 2008, the DRE was able to agree with the Deutsche Einheit Fernstraßenplanungs- und Baugesellschaft mbH (DEGES) a railway crossing agreement that will see the demolition and subsequent rebuilding of the railway bridge over the BAB 9 in 2009.

In the current 2007/2008 Deutsche Bahn timetable the line from Triptis to Bad Lobenstein is number KBS 556.

==== Lichtenberg–Marxgrün in Bavaria ====
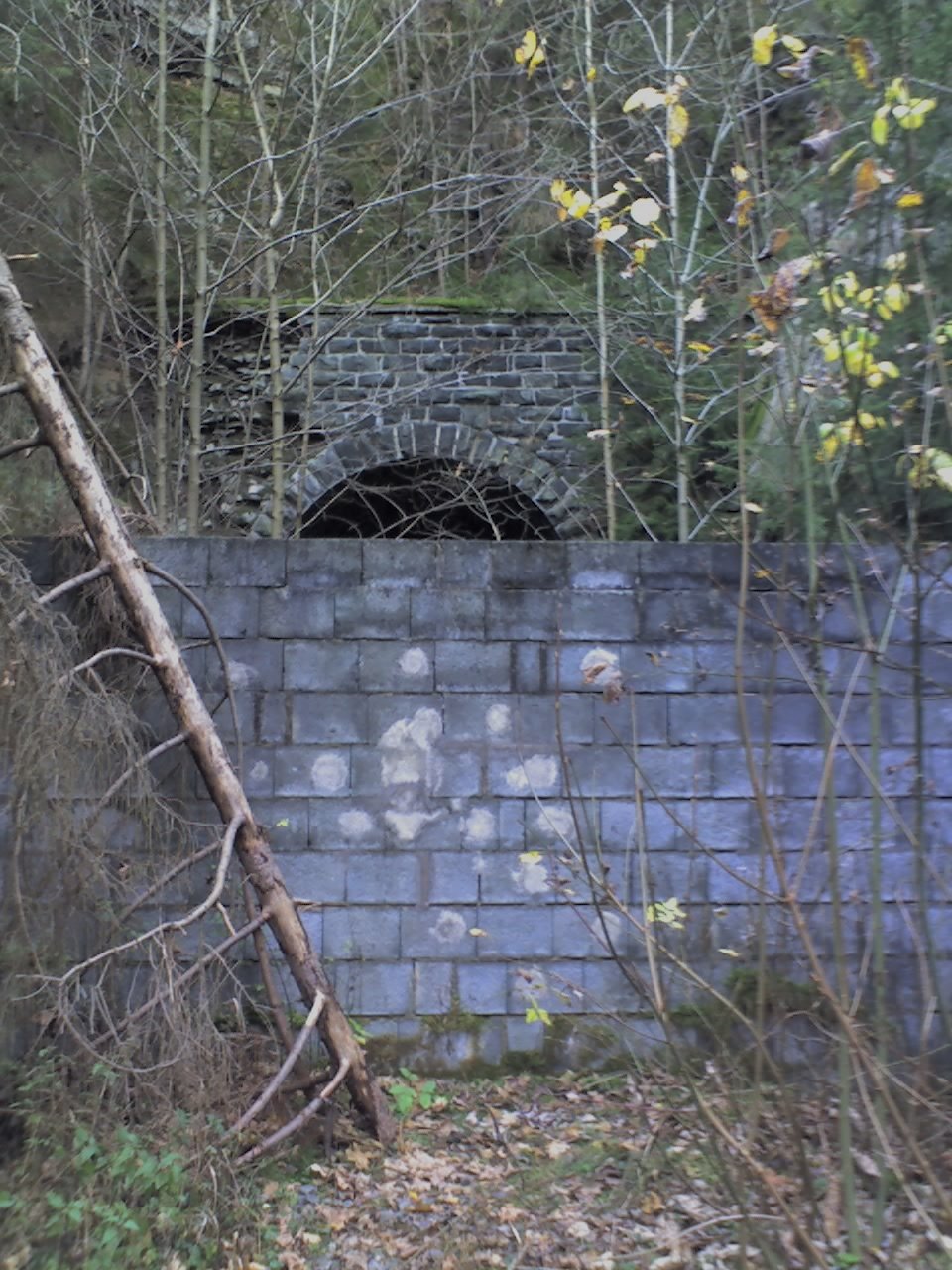
Entrance to the Kesselfels tunnel, 2008

On the Bavarian side after the Second World War the only significant use of the line between Lichtenberg and Marxgrün was for local goods traffic. Since 23 May 1971 even that was withdrawn and the line closed. Shortly before Hölle station the siding of Wiede was installed which for a long time was used to transport carbonic acid made at the Wiede acid works served by the siding.

The dismantling of the track in the Höllental began in September 1982. On 30 October 1987 services to the firm of Wiede ended and the rest of the line was lifted. The bridges in the Hölle Valley were not demolished, but the tunnel was walled up for safety reasons.

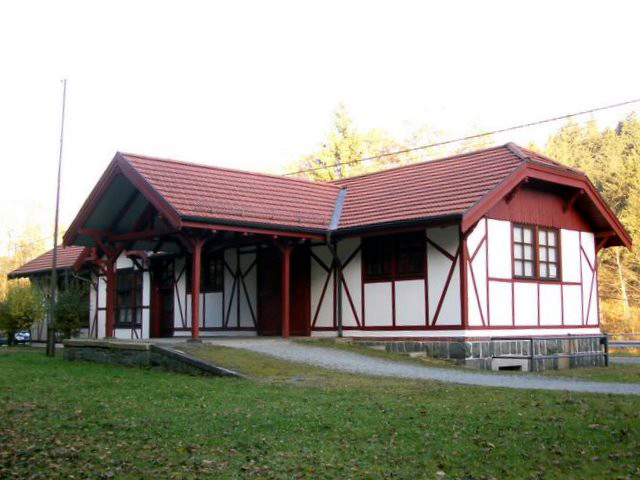
Lichtenberg station

After its final closure in 1971 a Lokalbahn working group (Lokalbahn-Arbeitsgemeinschaft or LAG) was founded in Hof, one goal of which was to organise a museum railway on the Hölle Valley railway. The home of the LAG was the engine shed at Marxgrün. Here there was already a 1937 steam engine from the Regensburg sugar factory. The maintenance of the line exceeded the financial means of the LAG. The locomotive shed in Marxgrün has meanwhile been cleared. The building is in a very dilapidated state.

The timber-framed station building in Hölle was to have been preserved and used as a guest house for visitors to the spa town. These plans, produced in 1977, could not however been put into effect. The building was finally demolished and the station yard turned into a car park.

I the former station of Lichtenberg there is an information centre for the Franconian Forest Nature Reserve, where a functioning model of the Höllentalbahn, in 1:87 (H0) scale, can be viewed. The layout is looked after by the MEC 01 Münchberger Eisenbahnfreunde e.V.. In front of Lichtenberg station, on a short piece of track, an old industrial locomotive (Lok 3; Cfl; Babelsberg 1969/219189; FLC - 92061) from the Rosenthal Cellulose and Paper Factory (ZPR) in Blankenstein as well as several coaches and wagons recall the days of the train in the Hölle Valley.

Currently the Deutsche Regionaleisenbahn is striving to take over the Höllentalbahn (Blankenstein–Marxgrün). (as at 06/2008)

== Prospects ==
The Höllental Railway Network Initiative wants to reactivate the line through the Höllental in order to generate an effective railway link between Thuringia and Bavaria, especially for goods traffic.

The Rosenthal Cellulose and Paper Factory in Blankenstein has a major interest in closing the gap in the network in the direction of Bavaria. Because 63% of its production is already transported by rail, this proportion would be further increased if there were a direct railway link to the south. The firm has therefore organised a transport conference to develop the infrastructure in the southern Saale-Orla-Kreis on 9 December 2008.

On 16 December 2008, the town of Naila demanded that the reactivation of the route between Marxgrün and Blankenstein be included in the regional plan for Upper Franconia-East (Oberfranken-Ost). This was founded in order to improve rail traffic between Bavaria and Thuringia especially with regard to tourism and goods traffic for the logging industry. Counter-arguments include the fact that the Hölle valley was declared a nature reserve in 1997.

== Locomotives ==
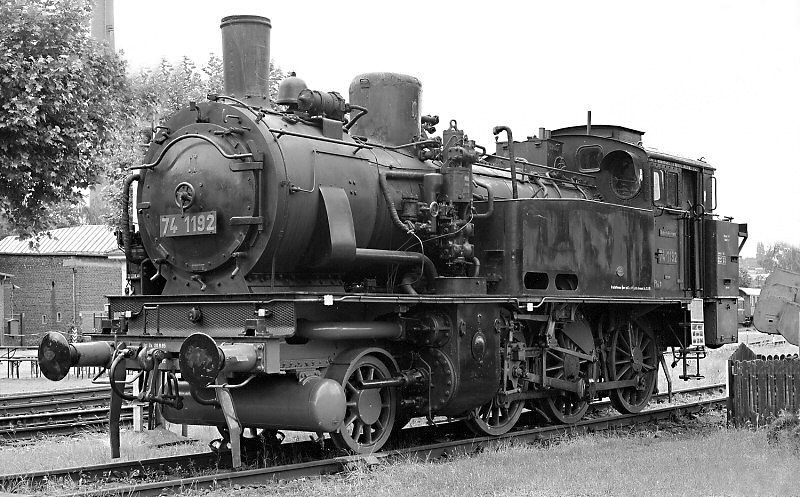
Class 74.4 (Prussian T 12)

There were Prussian locomotives on the Hölle Valley railway in the early years:

- G 2 - goods train, tender locomotive
- G 3 (BR 53.70) - goods train, tender locomotive
- G 5.1 (BR 54.0) / G 5.1 (BR 54.2) / G 5.3 (BR 54.6) / G 5.4 (BR 54.8) / G 5.5 (BR 54.10) - goods train, tender locomotive
- G 8 (BR 55.16) - goods train, tender locomotive
- P 2 - passenger train, tender locomotive
- T 9.3 (BR 91.3) - goods train, tank locomotive
- T 11 (BR 74.0) - passenger train, tank locomotive
- T 12 (BR 74.4) - passenger train, tank locomotive
- T 13 (BR 92.5) - goods train, tank locomotive
- T 14 (BR 93.0) - goods train, tank locomotive

Later the following standard locomotives (Einheitslokomotiven) were employed:

- BR 64 - passenger train, tank locomotive (only Hof-Bad Steben)
- BR 86 - goods train, tank locomotive

Diesel locomotives also found their way into the Hölle valley towards the end:

- BR V60 (260) - shunter
- BR V100 (211) – mixed locomotive
- BR Köf III (331-333) – station pilot

== Sources ==
- Horst W. Bauer, Vom Paradies in die Hölle, in Hp1 - Eisenbahnmodellbau heute Ausgabe Nr. 17/2001, Willy Kosak Verlag, Neuhaus (Pegnitz) 2001
- Stefan Winkler, Einmal Hölle und Zurück, Sonderausgabe des Eisenbahnjournals 1/93
- Siegfried Bufe, Eisenbahn in Oberfranken, Bufe-Fachbuch-Verlag, München 1982, ISBN 3-922138-13-6
- Ralf Roman Rossberg, Grenze über deutschen Schienen, Eisenbahn-Kurier Verlag, Freiburg im Breisgau 1980, ISBN 3-88255-828-8
- Deutsche Reichsbahn / Horst-Werner Dumjahn, Die deutschen Eisenbahnen in ihrer Entwicklung 1835 - 1935, Reichsdruckerei, Berlin 1935 / Nachdruck mit Vorwort von Horst-Werner Dumjahn: Dumjahn Verlag, Mainz 1984, ISBN 3-921426-29-4
