= Prussian S 5.1 =

Prussian express steam locomotive

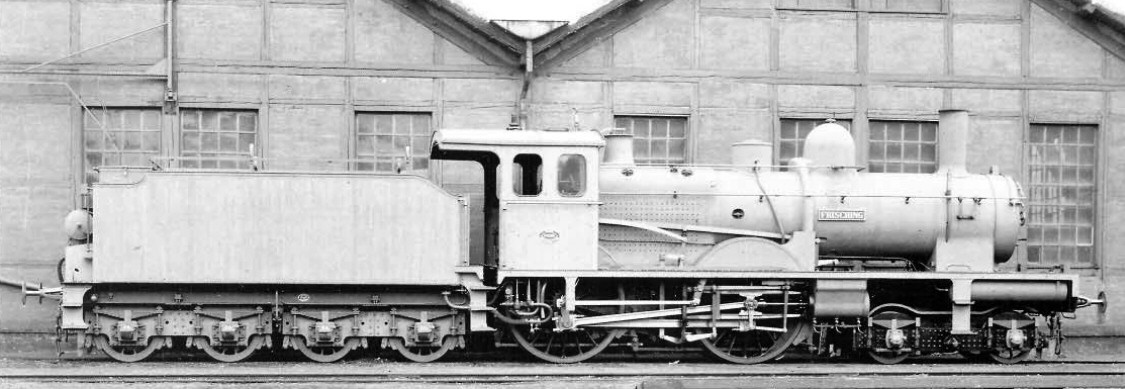
- A18 (S 5) series locomotive of the Alsace-Lorraine railways
Type and origin
- Power type: Steam
- Builder: Grafenstaden, Henschel & Son, Hanomag
- Build date: 1900–1904
Specifications
- Configuration
  - UIC: 2'B n4v (2-2-0)
- Leading dia.: 1,980 mm (78 in)
- Trailing dia.: 1,000 mm (39 in)
- Wheelbase: 7,450 mm (293 in)/7,500 mm (300 in)
- Length: 17,550 mm (691 in)/17,620 mm (694 in)
- Service weight: 54 t (53 long tons; 60 short tons)/52.8 t (52.0 long tons; 58.2 short tons)
- Firebox
  - Grate area: 2.3 m^{2} (25 sq ft)/2.27 m^{2} (24.4 sq ft)
- Boiler pressure: 14 at
- Heating surface: 122 m^{2} (1,310 sq ft)/119 m^{2} (1,280 sq ft)
- Piston stroke: 640 mm (25 in)/600 mm (24 in)
Performance figures
- Maximum speed: 100 km/h (62 mph)
- Tractive effort: 6,400 kg (14,100 lb)

The S 5.1 was the Prussian express steam locomotive series (originally S 5), produced between 1900 and 1903 in two variants. It featured a four-cylinder compound engine using saturated steam and a wheel arrangement of 2'B (2-2-0). After World War I, only one S 5.1 locomotive was used by the Polish State Railways, designated Pd3. A similar series was employed by the Alsace-Lorraine railways.

== Development history ==
In the late 19th century, four-cylinder compound engines were considered ideal for express locomotives, offering high power, operational efficiency, and excellent balance compared to two-cylinder designs. This was particularly important for express locomotives. The concept was independently promoted in Germany by August von Borries of the Hanover Prussian railway directorate, designer of the popular Prussian S 3 express locomotive, and Alfred de Glehn, who developed the world's first four-cylinder compound locomotive in 1886. De Glehn, director of the Belfort works linked to the Alsatian Machine Factory Grafenstaden in German-annexed Alsace, built the first 2'B four-cylinder compound locomotive for the French Nord railways in 1891.

To test this configuration, the Prussian railways ordered an experimental express locomotive with a 2'B wheel arrangement, numbered Berlin 37, built by Grafenstaden in 1894 (factory number 4550), the first Prussian locomotive with a four-cylinder compound engine. Later designated Erfurt 37, and from 1906 as Erfurt 501 in the S5 series (though not reclassified as S 5.1), it followed de Glehn's design with high-pressure cylinders driving the second driving axle, positioned externally near the locomotive's midpoint, behind the front bogie and just before the coupled wheels. Low-pressure cylinders, located inside the frame under the smokebox, drove the first driving axle via a crank axle. This made both coupled axles powered, reducing stress on a single axle. The locomotive featured an external Heusinger valve gear, a Belpaire boiler with a 110 m² heating surface and 2.05 m² grate area, and a distinctive bogie with an external frame. Initially, it had a French-style minimal cab, later rebuilt to Prussian standards. It used a three-axle tender with 15 m³ water and 5 t coal capacity.

The production locomotives, designated S 5 from 1906 and S 5.1 from 1911 (with the introduction of the S 5.2), belonged to two variants: Grafenstaden and Hannover.

== S 5.1 Grafenstaden variant ==
22 locomotives ordered for the Prussian railways used de Glehn's four-cylinder compound system. 10 were built in 1902 by Grafenstaden, and 12 in 1903 by Henschel & Son in Kassel. These retained de Glehn's design but featured a heavier build, a more efficient Belpaire boiler with a 122 m² heating surface, a 2.3 m² grate, and an extended smokebox. The boiler was raised 19 cm (centerline at 245 cm instead of 226 cm). The engine dimensions remained unchanged, but the driving wheel diameter was reduced to 1.98 m, standard for German 2'B locomotives since the S 3. The design speed increased from 90 to 100 km/h. The coupled axle spacing remained 3 m, while the bogie axle spacing increased to 2.05 m (Grafenstaden) or 2.1 m (Henschel). The Grafenstaden variant had a hemispherical steam dome, while Henschel's was cylindrical. They used a standard Prussian four-axle tender (Musterblatt III-5f) with 16 m³ water and 5 t coal capacity.

These locomotives served in the Prussian railway directorates of Altona (11 units), Erfurt, Magdeburg, and, from 1906, Hanover and Danzig, numbered 501–600. No further orders were placed due to the introduction of the S 7 series, considered the definitive design.

54 similar locomotives were built by Grafenstaden for the Alsace-Lorraine railways, reflecting the factory's location. 50 were produced between 1902 and 1904, with four more in 1913 for unclear reasons, as the series was outdated. Designated A18, then S 3 (1906), and S 5 (1912), they had a higher boiler pressure (15 atm) and French-style safety valves. The first 20 had 226 fire tubes (121.96 m² heating surface), while the later 34 had 104 larger tubes (169.85 m²). Outnumbering the Alsace-Lorraine S 3 (40 units), they operated expresses from Strasbourg until 1937.

== S 5.1 Hannover variant ==
The second S 5.1 variant, designed by von Borries and built by Hanomag in Hanover, produced 17 units. The prototype, built in 1900, won the Grand Prix at the Paris World Exhibition, with 16 more built between 1902 and 1903, all used in Hanover (numbered 501–517).

In von Borries' design, left and right cylinder pairs were cast together under the smokebox, at the bogie's midpoint. Low-pressure cylinders, positioned externally, drove the first coupled axle, while internal high-pressure cylinders drove the same axle via a crank axle, simplifying the mechanism but causing stress on curves, leading to deformations. It used an internal Heusinger valve gear, with von Borries' start-up valve. Despite literature suggesting otherwise, von Borries supported superheaters and planned to equip the prototype with a Schmidt chamber superheater, but this was blocked by Robert Garbe, who favored simple twin-cylinder superheated designs.

The locomotive evolved from the S 3, retaining its key dimensions: 1.98 m driving wheels, 2.7 m coupled axle spacing, 2.2 m bogie spacing, and a 119 m² boiler heating surface. It used the same Musterblatt III-5f tender. It differed from the S 3 and de Glehn designs with a rear-shifted tall steam dome and an additional front cylindrical air reservoir (later replaced by a horizontal one), with a prominent sandbox between.

== Service after World War I and in Poland ==
After World War I, Prussian locomotives were taken over by the German Railways. Most S 5.1 locomotives of both variants were withdrawn between 1919 and 1920, with the rest phased out soon after, none receiving new German Railways numbers.

Only one S 5.1, a de Glehn variant (Henschel, factory number 6447, Danzig 513, formerly Magdeburg 501), was transferred to Poland and designated Pd3-1 by the Polish State Railways. It was withdrawn before 1926, the only S 5.1 used outside Germany.

== Bibliography ==
- Rauter, Herbert; Scheingraber, Günther (1991). Preußen-Report. Band 2: Die Schnellzuglokomotiven der Gattung S 1 – S 11 [Prussia Report. Volume 2: Express Locomotives of Classes S 1 – S 11] (in German). Hermann Merker Verlag. ISBN 3-922404-16-2.
