= Pd1 =

PD1 may refer to:

- Prussian S 3 a 19th-century steam locomotive
- PD-1 the Programmed cell death protein 1 receptor
