= Prussian S 4 =

Prussian S 4 DRG Class 13.5, 13.4
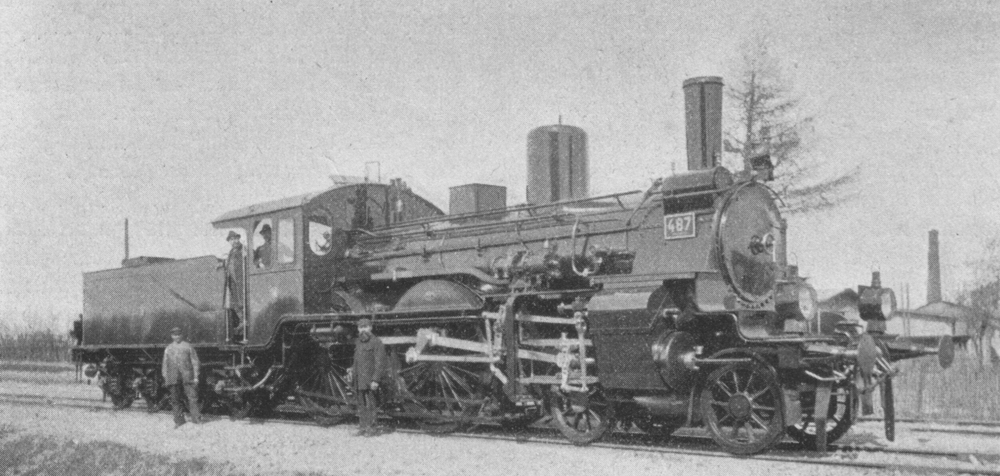
Type and origin
- Builder: Borsig (40); Henschel & Sohn (54); Humboldt (10)
- Build date: 1902–1909
- Total produced: 104
Specifications
- Configuration
  - Whyte: 4-4-0
  - German: S 24.16
- Gauge: 1,435 mm (4 ft 8 1/2 in)
- Leading dia.: 1,000 mm
- Driver dia.: 1,980 mm
- Length
  - Over beams: 18,210 mm
- Axle load: 16.0 t
- Adhesive weight: 31.9 t
- Service weight: 50.2 t
- Water cap.: 13.0/15.0/16.0 m^{3}
- Boiler
- No. of heating tubes: 115
- No. of smoke tubes: 18
- Heating tube length: 4,300 mm
- Boiler pressure: 12 bar
- Heating surface
  - Firebox: 2.32 m^{2}
  - Radiative: 10.65 m^{2}
  - Evaporative: 117.70 m^{2}
- Cylinders: 2
- Cylinder size: 540 mm
- Piston stroke: 600 mm
- Valve gear: Walschaerts (Heusinger, outside)
Performance figures
- Maximum speed: 100 km/h
- Indicated power: 736 kW
Career
- Numbers: DRG 13 501–504
- Retired: 1927
- Data for production series

The Prussian S 4's were German superheated express steam locomotives with the Prussian state railways, later grouped as DRG Class 13.5 in the Deutsche Reichsbahn. They were an evolutionary development of the Prussian S 3. The first locomotive was built in 1898 by Vulcan, Stettin as a modified S 3. She was the first superheated locomotive in the world. She was initially designated as Hannover 74 and towards the end as the S 4 Cassel 401. Two further trials locomotives appeared in 1899 and 1900 as Hannover 86 and Berlin 74 also classed as S 3's. They were later reclassified as S 4's Hannover 401 and Posen 401.

Not until the teething troubles had been resolved was the S 4 put into series production in 1902 in Borsig, from 1906 also in Henschel and Humboldt. Unlike the prototypes the production engines were developed independently of the S 3, and 104 examples were built in the years to 1909 when procurement was halted in favour of the Prussian S 6. Up to 1906 a smokebox superheater was installed; afterwards smoke tube superheaters were used.

The S 4's star waned even before the First World War, so that within a few years most of the engines had disappeared from the tracks. The remainder were employed on passenger train or even goods train duties.

In 1923 the Deutsche Reichsbahn recorded 44 S 4's in its provisional renumbering plan as 13 501-544. But by 1925 only four of them were left. These were given running numbers 13 501–504 in 1925 and were retired by 1927.

After the First World War, six locomotives were given to the Polish State Railways (PKP), where they were classified as Pd2 class, numbers 1 to 6. During the Second World War five S 4s came into the Reichsbahn holdings from Poland as 13 401–405. Two of them were eventually given back to Poland in 1955 by the DR.

The locomotives were equipped with tenders of Prussian classes pr 2’2’ T 16, pr 3 T 13 and pr 3 T 15.

== See also ==
- Prussian state railways
- List of DRG locomotives and railcars
- List of Prussian locomotives and railcars

== Literature ==
- Hütter, Ingo (2009). Die Dampflokomotiven der Baureihen 01 bis 45 der DRG, DRB, DB, und DR (in German). Werl: DGEG Medien. pp. 114–116. ISBN 978-3-937189-45-1.
- Rauter, Herbert; Scheingraber, Günther (1991). Preußen-Report. Band 2: Die Schnellzuglokomotiven der Gattung S 1 - S 11 (in German). Hermann Merker Verlag. ISBN 3-922404-16-2.
- Weisbrod, Manfred; Müller, Hans; Petznik, Wolfgang (1976). Dampflokomotiven deutscher Eisenbahnen, Baureihe 01–39 (EFA 1.1) (in German) (3rd ed.). Düsseldorf: Alba Buchverlag. pp. 77–78. ISBN 3-87094-081-6.
