= Robert Garbe =

Robert Hermann Garbe (pronounced 'Garber') (9 January 1847 – 23 May 1932) was a German railway engineer and chief engineer of the Berlin division in the Prussian state railways from 1895 to 1917. He was especially known for his steam locomotive designs and is described as one of the greatest authorities on the locomotive. He was the first to suggest the use of superheated steam, universally. However, he saw superheated steam as competing with other innovations such as double expansion compound steam engines (he held a grudge against Hannover's August Borries that his pupil Richard Paul Wagner inherited) or combustion chambers.

His designs were, on the one hand, simple to maintain and operate; on the other hand, he blocked innovations that every other pre-Reichsbahn state railway used successfully. He held the belief that two coupled axles were enough for any express engine (his masterpiece being the Prussian S 6 class) and trailing axles as in the "Pacific" configuration were unnecessary. The Prussian P 8 class had to be re-designed almost entirely from his design to become successful, and he envisaged it as an express engine.

In that way, he is known as one of the key pioneers of locomotive design because of his achievements concerning the use of superheated steam; his image is tarnished, however, by a conservatism that was proven wrong time and again contemporarily (e.g. by the Bavarian S 3/6, and thereafter André Chapelon designed highly successful modern compound locomotives, proving the success of every single innovation Garbe rejected).

== Childhood and Education ==
Born in Oppeln (present-day Opole, Opole Voivodeship), in Prussian Upper Silesia on 9 January 1847, Garbe was the eldest son of the master locksmith, Ferdinand Garbe. He went to elementary school in Oppeln and learned his father's locksmith trade. The desire for further education led him to the Technische Hochschule in Breslau, where he worked in the main workshops of the Upper Silesian Railway and passed his exams as an engine driver in 1867. He also visited the provincial trade school in Brieg, passed the leaving exams with distinction and went, in 1869, to the Königliche Gewerbeakademie (later the Technische Hochschule in Charlottenburg and now Technische Universität Berlin)). He finished his studies in 1872 with top marks in all disciplines.

== Prussian Railway Division ==
Afterwards, Garbe was the director of the Central Railway Workshop in Frankfurt (Oder). In 1877 the Ministry entrusted him with leading the main workshop in Berlin-Rummelsburg. In 1895 Garbe was nominated simultaneously as a board member of the Prussian Railway Division at Berlin and Head of Department for the Design and Procurement of Locomotives. In this capacity he also chaired the locomotive committee that had to make recommendations about future locomotive procurement to the Ministry of Public Works.

In 1907 the Prussian Railway Central Office was founded in Berlin. Here, Garbe took over the sphere of "Construction of Superheated Steam Locomotives and Tenders". Inspired by the work of Wilhelm Schmidt ('Hot Steam Schmidt') from Kassel, Garbe was already in 1893 of the view that the use of superheated steam would give steam locomotives a power advantage.

== Locomotive Development ==
The locomotives developed on the basis of the policy issued by Garbe were characterised above all by good performance and simple construction. Consciously, he did not strive for high performance with his designs, but gave priority to reliability and ease of maintenance. By the time Garbe retired, a total of 13 superheated steam locomotive classes had been developed along those lines for all the important locomotive duties, together with a number of experimental designs. Garbe's design fundamentals had been so much part of Prussian locomotive development that they continued to be used even after his retirement.

The Prussian P 8 symbolises to a great extent Garbe's design principles. A total of 3,948 examples were built (including the Rumanian copies) and they were working German railway routes until the end of the steam era around 1972–1974.

Garbe's major achievement in the field of technical steam locomotive development was the introduction of superheating, for which he was a keen advocate. He disapproved of compound working; he saw superheating as a total replacement for complicated and maintenance-intensive compound systems, not as an enhancement of them to produce increased power.

The most significant acknowledgement was granted to Garbe after he left the service of the state. The Technische Hochschule in Charlottenburg (now Technische Universität Berlin) awarded him an Honorary Doctorate of Engineering for his services in developing the superheated steam locomotive.

He died on 23 May 1932 in Berlin.

== Sources ==
- Robert Garbe: Die Dampflokomotiven der Gegenwart. (erschienen 1920) 1981 im Steiger-Verlag in Moers als Reprint.
- Robert Garbe: Die zeitgemäße Heißdampflokomotive. (1924) 1981 im Steiger-Verlag in Moers als Reprint.
- Maedel/Gottwald: Deutsche Dampflokomotiven - Die Entwicklungsgeschichte 1999 im Transpress-Verlag.
