= Prussian P 2 =

The Prussian Class P 2 consisted of various types of early, passenger train, steam locomotive operated by the Prussian state railways. There were 294 2-4-0 locomotives, 24 0-4-2 locomotives and two engines with a 4-4-0 wheel arrangement. Of the 2-4-0 type, 88 came from railway companies that were the predecessors to the Prussian state railways and did not comply with Prussian norms, 24 were of the Ruhr-Sieg type (see Prussian P 1) and 182 were standard P 2s. The 0-4-2 locomotives were identical with the Prussian G 2.

== P 2 (older standard type) ==
Prussian P 2
Type and origin
- Build date: 1877–1885
- Total produced: 242
Specifications
- Configuration
  - Whyte: 2-4-0
  - UIC: 1B
- Gauge: 1,435 mm (4 ft 8 1/2 in)
- Leading dia.: 980 mm
- Driver dia.: 1,580 mm
- Length
  - Over beams: 14,823
- Axle load: 10.2 t
- Adhesive weight: 25.1 t
- Service weight: 38.0 t
- Water cap.: 10.5 m^{3}
- Boiler pressure: 10 bar
- Heating surface
  - Firebox: 1.73 m^{2}
  - Evaporative: 95.36 m^{2}
- Cylinder size: 420 mm
- Piston stroke: 600 mm
Performance figures
- Maximum speed: 70–90 km/h

Between 1877 and 1885 a total of 242 locomotives of the standard P 2 class were delivered to the Prussian state railways and its forebears. The engines were initially intended for services on the so-called Cannons Railway (Kanonenbahn) from Berlin to Wetzlar and Metz. Later they were also employed on other routes in express and passenger train service. When locomotives were reclassified in 1906, 17 units were allocated to Class P 1, 182 to Class P 2 and 7 to Class P 3. The rest had already been retired by that time.

The Royal Prussian Military Railway (Königlich Preussische Militär-Eisenbahn) also had a P 2. Several were built for the Neustrelitz-Warnemünde Railway (Neustrelitz-Warnemünder Eisenbahn) in Mecklenburg and six for the Grand Duchy of Mecklenburg Friedrich-Franz Railway (see Mecklenburg P 2). The Lübeck-Büchen Railway had 9 P 2s in its fleet; however these were smaller and less powerful than their Prussian cousins.

The vehicles were equipped with a Crampton boiler, inside valve gear of the template (Musterblatt) 15 type (158 units) or outside valve gear of the template 16 type (84 units). They were coupled with tenders of Class 3 T 10.5.

Although they proved very reliable, all the machines were retired by the First World War. Only four P 2s from Mecklenburg made it into the DRG's provisional renumbering plan in 1923 as nos. 34 7201 - 7204.

== P 2 (Rhenish Railway) ==
P 2 (Rhenish Railway)
Type and origin
- Build date: 1879, 1886
- Total produced: 12
Specifications
- Configuration
  - Whyte: 4-4-0
  - UIC: 2'B
- Gauge: 1,435 mm (4 ft 8 1/2 in)
- Leading dia.: 905 mm
- Driver dia.: 1,708 mm
- Length
  - Over beams: 14,125 mm
- Axle load: 12.4 t
- Adhesive weight: 24.8 t
- Service weight: 36.5 t
- Tender type: pr 2 T 7
- Fuel capacity: 3.5 t coal
- Water cap.: 7 m^{3}
- Boiler pressure: 10 bar
- Heating surface
  - Firebox: 1.70 m^{2}
  - Evaporative: 85.7 m^{2}
- Cylinder size: 432 mm
- Piston stroke: 610 mm
Career
- Retired: by 1906

The Rhenish Railway Company (Rheinische Eisenbahn-Gesellschaft) procured seven 4-4-0 locomotives for use in express and passenger train service on the winding Cologne - Euskirchen - Trier route. These were the first 4-4-0 locomotives in Prussia. The movable, leading bogie meant that the wear and tear on the wheel flanges was not as severe as that on locomotives with fixed carrying axles. The first seven locomotives bought from Vulcan in 1879 were followed by a further 5 from Hanomage in 1886 delivered to Cologne West (Cöln linksrheinisch) railway division. These engines were subsequently transferred to the Saarbrücken division, two being reclassified as P 2 Saarbrücken, nos. 1567 and 1568, but were retired by 1906.

== See also ==
- Prussian state railways
- List of Prussian locomotives and railbuses

== Sources ==
- Rauter, Herbert (1991). Preußen-Report Band Nr. 4 (in German). Hermann-Merker-Verlag Fürstenfeldbruck. ISBN 3-922404-21-9.
- Wagner, Andreas; Bäzold, Dieter; Zschech, Rainer; Lüderitz, Ralph (1990). Lokomotiven preußischer Eisenbahnen, Schnellzug- und Personenzuglokomotiven (EFA 2.3.1) (in German). Düsseldorf: Alba. pp. 233–244, 325–326. ISBN 3-87094-133-2.
