= Prussian S 9 =

Locomotive

Prussian S 8, S 9 DRG Class 14.0 SNCB Type 69
Type and origin
- Builder: Hanomag
- Build date: 1908ff.
- Total produced: 99 (2 were "S8"s)
Specifications
- Configuration
  - UIC: 4-4-2
  - German: S 8: S 2/5 h4v S 9: S 2/5 n4v
- Gauge: 1,435 mm (4 ft 8 1/2 in)
- Leading dia.: 1,000 mm (3 ft 3 in)
- Coupled dia.: 1,980 mm (6 ft 6 in)
- Trailing dia.: 1,250 mm (4 ft 1 in)
- Wheelbase
  - Overall: 10,750 mm (35.27 ft)
- Length
  - Over beams: 21,860 mm (71.72 ft)
- Axle load: 16.5 t (16.2 long tons; 18.2 short tons)
- Adhesive weight: 33.0 t (32.5 long tons; 36.4 short tons)
- Empty weight: 68.0 t (66.9 long tons; 75.0 short tons)
- Service weight: 74.7 t (73.5 long tons; 82.3 short tons)
- Water cap.: 21.5 / 30.0 / 31.5 m^{3} (4,700 / 6,600 / 6,900 imp gal; 5,700 / 7,900 / 8,300 US gal)
- Boiler
- No. of heating tubes: 272
- Heating tube length: 5,200 mm (17.1 ft)
- Boiler pressure: 14 bar (1,400 kPa; 200 psi)
- Heating surface
  - Firebox: 4.00 m^{2} (43.1 ft^{2})
  - Radiative: 14.10 m^{2} (151.8 ft^{2})
  - Tubes: 222.00 m^{2} (2,389.6 ft^{2})
  - Evaporative: S 8: 229.71 m^{2} (2,472.6 ft^{2}); S 9: 182.54 m^{2} (1,964.8 ft^{2})
- Cylinders: 4
- High-pressure cylinder: 380 mm (15.0 in)
- Low-pressure cylinder: 580 mm (22.8 in)
- Piston stroke: 600 mm (23.6 in)
Performance figures
- Maximum speed: 110 km/h (68 mph)
Career
- Numbers: DRG 14 001, 002, 031
- Retired: 1926

The Prussian S 9 was a class of express steam locomotive with the Prussian state railways, first built in 1908. It had a 4-4-2 (Atlantic) wheel arrangement and a four-cylinder compound engine. It was developed by the firm of Hanomag in Hanover who delivered a total of 99 engines of this class.

There were also some high-speed trials locomotives which were classified as S 9s, but did not belong to this particular class. These included two cab-forward 4-4-4 locomotives Altona 561 and 562.

Although at the time superheated technology was widespread, the state of Prussia still wanted to have saturated steam engines delivered by Hanomag. The locomotives procured as a result had a very powerful boiler and, at 4 m^{2} (43 ft^{2}), the largest grate area of any Prussian steam locomotive. The quantity of steam generated was however more than the high-pressure cylinders could cope with. As a result, the performance of the S 9 was little better than the considerably smaller superheated locomotive, the Prussian S 6. Nevertheless, the S 9 initially formed the backbone of express train services from Berlin to Hanover. Like all German Atlantic locomotives, the S 9 quickly proved too underpowered for the increasingly heavy trains it had to haul.

Two locomotives (Hannover 903 and 905) were fitted with superheated boilers in 1913 and 1914 and reclassified as S 8s.

After 1919 17 locomotives had to handed over to Belgium and 4 to France. Only three of them, the two S 8s and a saturated steam engine, were taken over by the Deutsche Reichsbahn as DRG Class 14.0. The two S 8s were given numbers 14 001 and 14 002; the S 9 ("Essen 907") number 14 031. All three were retired by 1926.

The locomotives were equipped with Prussian tenders of classes pr 2'2' T 21.5, pr 2'2' T 30 und pr 2'2' T 31.5.

Belgian engines managed to outlive German engines by several years since they were only written-off in 1948. They were used on fast trains on the lines around Antwerp.

== See also ==
- Prussian state railways
- List of Prussian locomotives and railcars
