= Prussian S 10 =

Steam locomotives in Prussia

The Prussian Class S 10 included all express train locomotives in the Prussian state railways that had a 4-6-0 wheel arrangement. There were four sub-classes: the S 10, S 10.1 (with 1911 and 1914 variants) and S 10.2.

== Prussian S 10 ==
Prussian S 10 DRG Class 17.0–1 SNCB Type 60
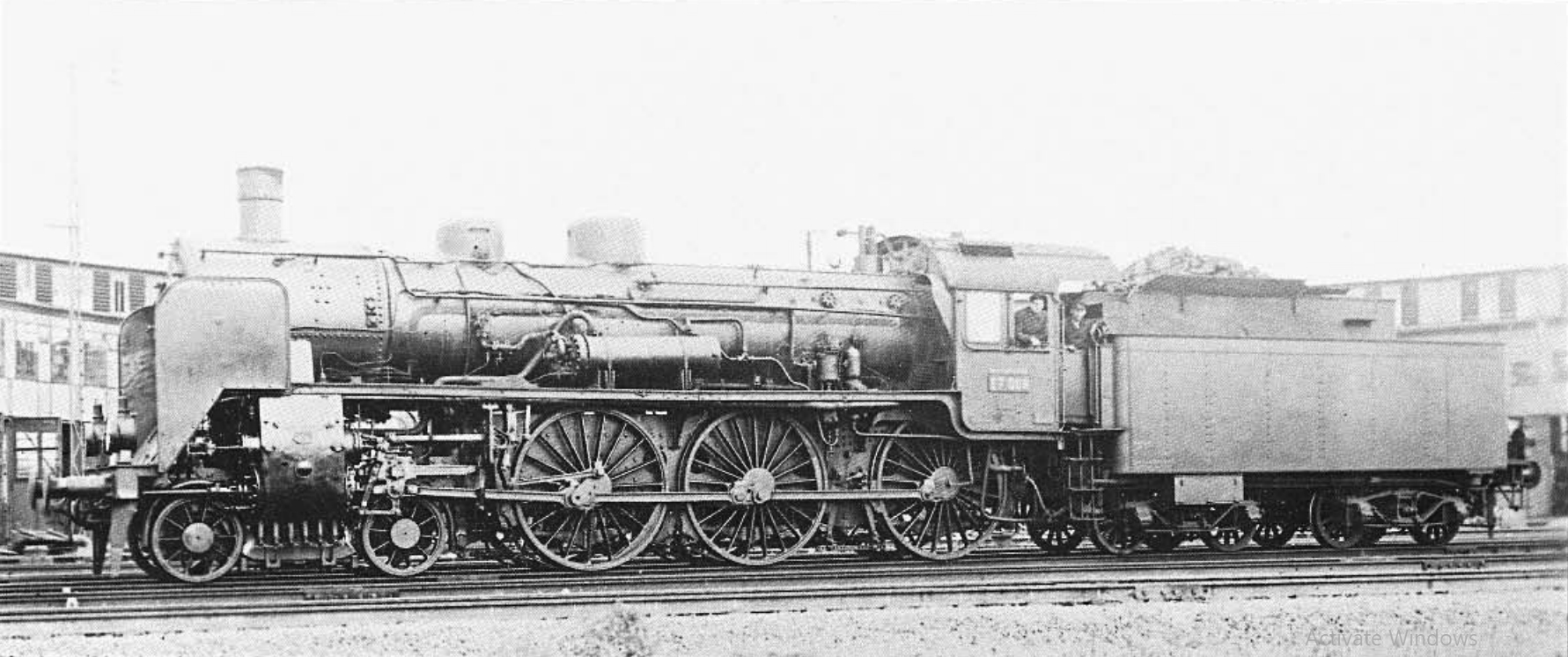
Type and origin
- Builder: Berliner Maschinenbau AG
- Build date: 1910–1914
- Total produced: 202
Specifications
- Configuration
  - Whyte: 4-6-0
- Gauge: 1,435 mm (4 ft 8 1/2 in)
- Leading dia.: 1,000 mm (39.4 in)
- Driver dia.: 1,980 mm (78.0 in)
- Length
  - Over beams: 20,750 mm (68 ft 1 in)
- Axle load: 17.5 t (39,000 lb)
- Adhesive weight: 50.9 t (112,000 lb)
- Service weight: 77.2 t (170,000 lb)
- Water cap.: 21.5 m^{3} (5,700 US gal), 31.5 m^{3} (8,300 US gal)
- Boiler pressure: 14 bar (1.4 MPa)
- Heating surface
  - Firebox: 2.86 m^{2} (4,430 in^{2})
  - Evaporative: 153.09 m^{2} (1,647.8 ft^{2})
- Superheater
  - Heating area: 61.50 m^{2} (662.0 ft^{2})
- Cylinders: 4
- Cylinder size: 430 mm (16.93 in)
- Piston stroke: 630 mm (24.80 in)
Performance figures
- Maximum speed: 110 km/h (68 mph)
- Indicated power: 861 kW (1,155 hp)
Career
- Numbers: DRG 17 001–135
- Retired: 1954

As a result of the lack of powerful express locomotives in the first decade of the 20th century, the Prussian state railways ordered the Class S 10 locomotives from Schwartzkopff. This engine was an evolutionary development of the passenger train locomotive, the Prussian P 8, which can be seen from the similarity in their locomotive frames. Unlike the P 8, however, the S 10—inspired by the Saxon XII H—had a four-cylinder engine with simple expansion.

Between 1910 and 1914 a total of 202 locomotives were built. The two prototypes were initially designated as S 8 class and only reclassified in 1912 to S 10. The Lübeck-Büchen Railway took delivery of five similar, albeit somewhat less powerful, machines that they also designated as the S 10.

Over the course of time several modifications were made. In the end the S 10 proved to be worse than the S 10^{1}, a four-cylinder compound locomotive in terms of both steam and coal consumption and was one of the most uneconomical Prussian locomotives.

The Deutsche Reichsbahn took over 135 locomotives into its Class 17.0-1 and gave them the running numbers 17 001–135. They were retired by 1935, however, due to their high fuel consumption. Only three examples (17 039, 102 and 107) survived the Second World War, as braking locomotives. The last S 10 was retired in 1954.

Number 17 008 has been sectioned and is on display in the German Museum of Technology in Berlin .

The S 10s were coupled with tenders of classes pr 2'2' T 21.5 and pr 2'2' T 31.5.

== Prussian S 10.1 (1911 variant) ==
Prussian S 10.1 - 1911 variant (Prussia, Alsace-Lorraine) DRG Class 17.10–11 ÖBB Class 617
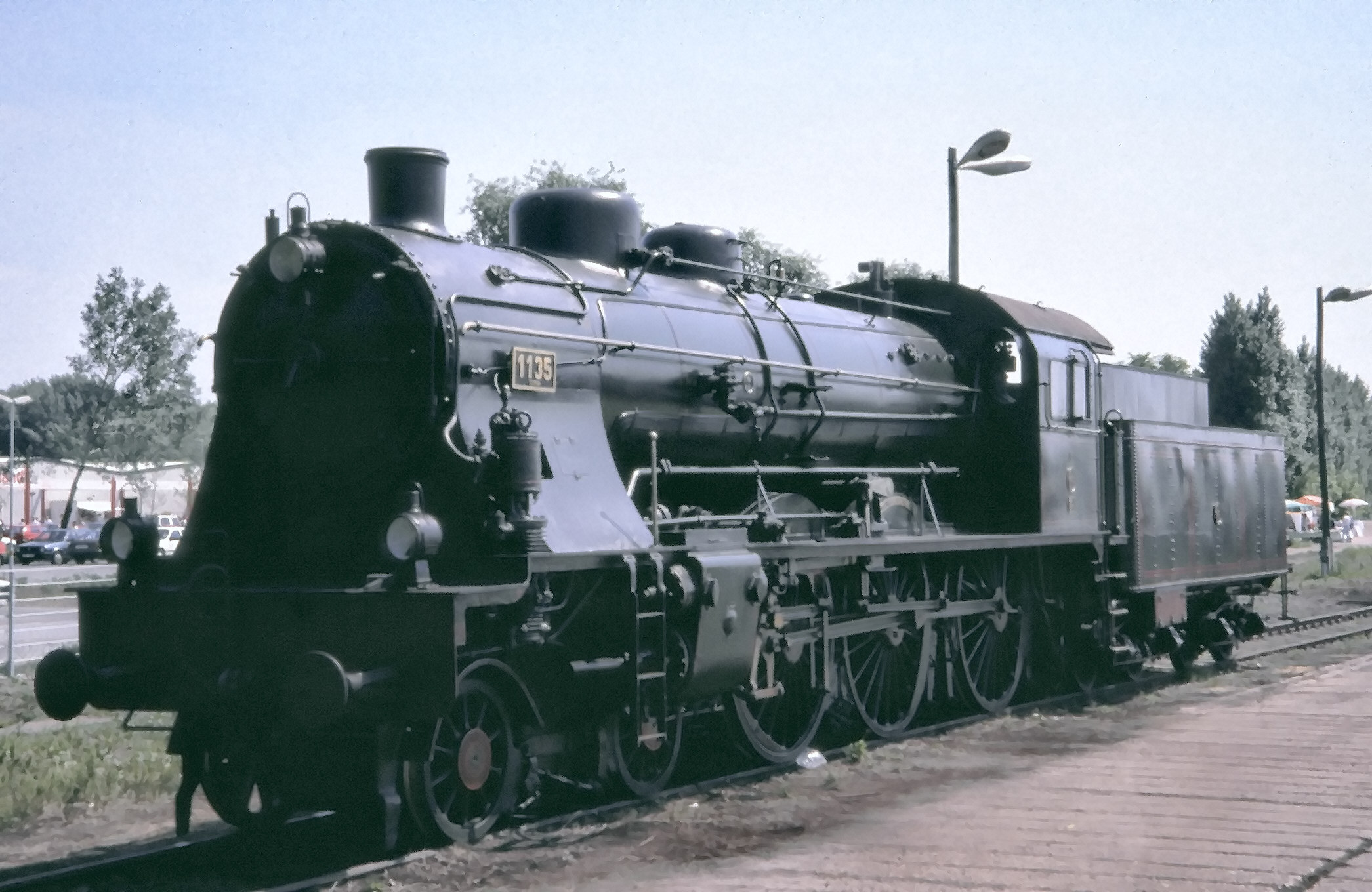
- Prussian S10.1 as "Osten 1135" on 17.5.1993 in Potsdam
Type and origin
- Builder: Henschel
- Build date: 1911–1914
- Total produced: 152
Specifications
- Configuration
  - Whyte: 4-6-0
- Gauge: 1,435 mm (4 ft 8 1/2 in)
- Leading dia.: 1,000 mm
- Driver dia.: 1,980 mm
- Length
  - Over beams: 21,110 mm
- Axle load: 17.8 t
- Adhesive weight: 53.2 t
- Service weight: 83.1 t
- Water cap.: 21.5/31.5 m^{3}
- Boiler pressure: 15 bar (1.5 MPa)
- Heating surface
  - Firebox: 3.18 m^{2}
  - Evaporative: 161.22 m^{2}
- Superheater
  - Heating area: 58.50 m^{2}
- Cylinders: 4
- Cylinder size: 2×400/610 mm
- Piston stroke: 660 mm
Performance figures
- Maximum speed: 120 km/h
- Indicated power: 1,044 kW
Career
- Numbers: DRG 17 1001–1123, 1145–1153
- Retired: 1963

Even as production started on the S 10, Henschel were given an order for the manufacture of a compound locomotive, which promised to deliver lower coal consumption.

This locomotive, classified as the S 10.1, was not based on the S 10, but was a new design. The four-cylinder compound engine was of the de Glehn type, which meant that the outside cylinders, set well to the rear, drove the second coupled axle and the inside cylinder drove the first. The engines were larger and more powerful than the S 10 and, thanks to their compound engines, also more economical.

Between 1911 and 1914, no less than 135 examples were built for Prussia and 17 for Alsace-Lorraine. Following initial dissatisfaction with the vehicles, several modifications to the locomotives finally led to the desired success. For example, no feedwater preheater was fitted to start with for weight-saving reasons, but one was later installed. The remaining disadvantages, such as the poor accessibility of the inside drive, led to the development of a new version in the shape of the 1914 variant.

After three locomotives were sent abroad as reparations, the Deutsche Reichsbahn took over the remaining 132 vehicles as Class 17.10–11 with numbers 17 1001–1123 and 17 1145–1153.

The three locomotives left in 1945 with the Austrian Federal Railway were renumbered to 617.1004, 617.1089 and 617.1099 and retired in 1957.

The Deutsche Bundesbahn withdrew their last S 10.1 engines in 1952. The Deutsche Reichsbahn in East Germany held onto these locomotives for longer and converted 13 examples to coal-dust firing. Locomotive number 17 1119 was given a condensing tender. In 1963 the last machines were taken out of service by the DR.

Number 17 1055 (formerly "Posen 1107", running as "Osten 1135") was partly returned to its original configuration and belongs today to the Dresden Transport Museum.

The S 10.1s were equipped with tenders of Prussian classes pr 2'2' T 21.5 and pr 2'2' T 31.5.

== Prussian S 10.1 (1914 variant) ==
Prussian S 10.1 - 1914 variant DRG Class 17.11–12 SNCB Type 61
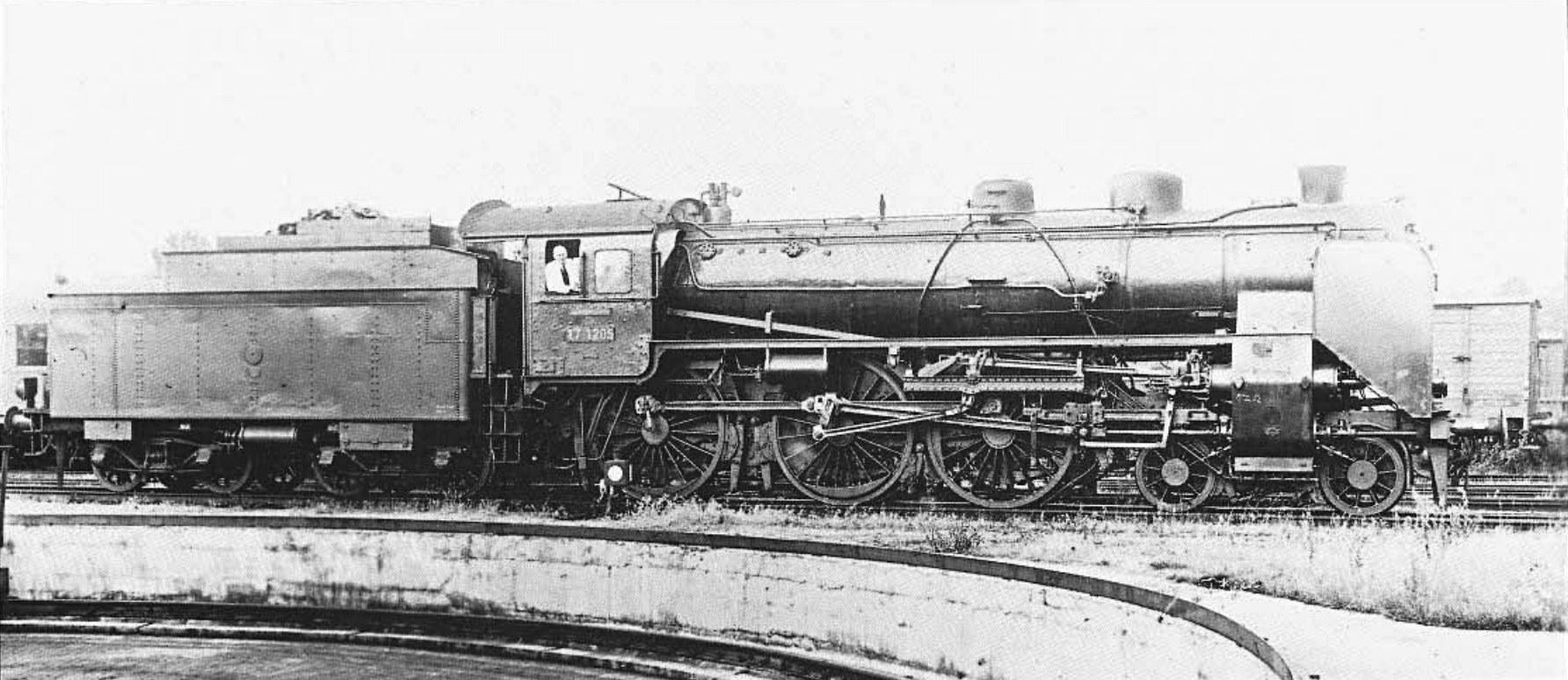
Type and origin
- Builder: Henschel
- Build date: 1914ff.
- Total produced: 109
Specifications
- Configuration
  - Whyte: 4-6-0
- Gauge: 1,435 mm (4 ft 8 1/2 in)
- Leading dia.: 1,000 mm
- Driver dia.: 1,980 mm
- Length
  - Over beams: 17,670 mm
- Axle load: 17,7 t
- Adhesive weight: 52.0 t
- Service weight: 84.2 t
- Boiler pressure: 15 bar (1.5 MPa)
- Heating surface
  - Firebox: 2.95 m^{2}
  - Evaporative: 161.22 m^{2}
- Superheater
  - Heating area: 52.10 m^{2}
- Cylinders: 4
- Cylinder size: 2×400/610 mm
- Piston stroke: 660 mm
Performance figures
- Maximum speed: 110 km/h
- Indicated power: > 1,100 kW
Career
- Numbers: DRG 17 1124–1144, 1154–1209
- Retired: 1964

Various disadvantages of the 1911 variant of the S 10.1, such as the difficulty of accessing the inside driving gear and the long steam lines between high and low-pressure cylinders, caused the Prussian state railways to have the design reworked.

The four cylinders were now located – as on the von Borries compound – on a slant; the twin-axle drive configuration was however retained. Even the boiler was modified; grate and firebox heating areas and the superheater were increased in size. Due to the altered location of the cylinders the running plate could be raised, which gave the locomotives a higher and more modern appearance, although in fact the height of the boiler axis above the rails remained unchanged.

In spite of these considerable differences, the 1914 variant was also designated as the S 10.1. These locomotives were the most powerful expresses in Prussia, and the Prussian state railways continued to live without Pacific locomotives. In 1914, one locomotive reached a speed of 152 km/h on a trial run with three coaches (according to some sources it may even have reached 156 km/h).

The Deutsche Reichsbahn took over 77 locomotives as Class 17.11-12 with the numbers 17 1124–1144 and 1154–1209.

In the DR in the GDR two 1914 variant locomotives were given Wendler coal-dust firing. The last engine was retired in 1964. Unlike the 1911 variant, no 1914 variant of this locomotive class remains preserved.

== Prussian S 10.2 ==
Prussian S 10.2 DRG Class 17.2 SNCB Type 62
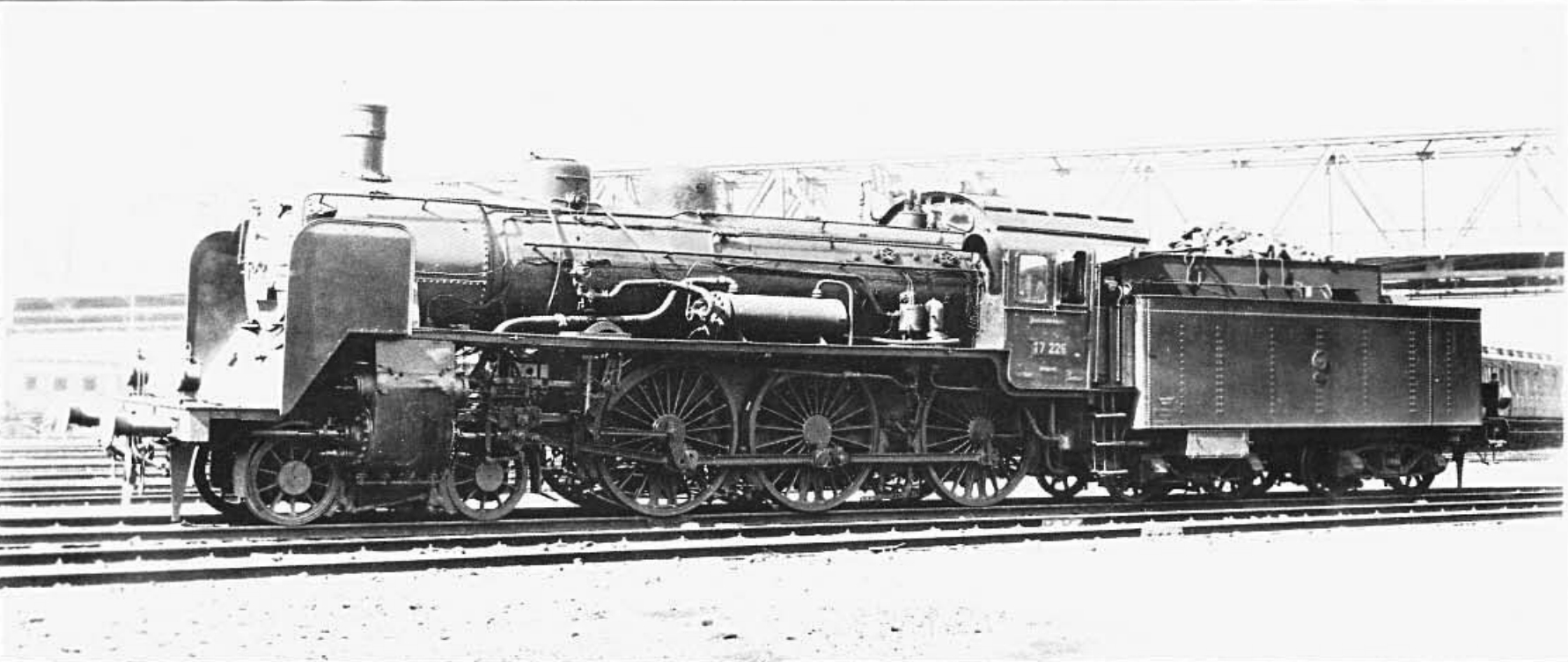
Type and origin
- Builder: Vulcan
- Build date: 1914ff.
- Total produced: 124
Specifications
- Configuration
  - Whyte: 4-6-0
- Gauge: 1,435 mm (4 ft 8 1/2 in)
- Leading dia.: 1,000 mm
- Driver dia.: 1,980 mm
- Length
  - Over beams: 21,200 mm
- Axle load: 17.8 t
- Adhesive weight: 53.4 t
- Service weight: 80.9 t
- Water cap.: 31.5 m^{3}
- Boiler pressure: 14 bar (1.4 MPa)
- Heating surface
  - Firebox: 2.86 m^{2}
  - Evaporative: 153.09 m^{2}
- Superheater
  - Heating area: 61.50 m^{2}
- Cylinders: 3
- Cylinder size: 500 mm
- Piston stroke: 630 mm
Performance figures
- Maximum speed: 120 km/h
- Indicated power: 883 kW
Career
- Numbers: DRG 17 201–296
- Retired: 1948

The Stettiner Maschinenbau AG Vulcan built the Class S 10.2 based on the S 10. In contrast to the S 10 it only had three cylinders, but was otherwise largely identical.

The Prussian state railways bought a total of 124 locomotives from 1914. These variants were certainly superior to the S 10, but not the S 10.1.

28 engines had to be handed to foreign railway administrations after the First World War. The Deutsche Reichsbahn took over the remaining 96 vehicles, incorporating them into Class 17.2 with running numbers 17 201–296. The remaining engines were gathered together into the northern and central German Reichsbahn railway divisions. Here they were partly replaced from 1930 by the Class 03.

88 engines survived the Second World War and ended up with the Deutsche Bundesbahn, where they were retired by 1948.

The S 10.2s were equipped with pr 2'2' T 31.5 tenders.

== Trial locomotives ==
Three S 10.2s were fitted with Stumpf parallel-flow cylinders (Gleichstromzylinder) for test purposes, whereby unlike the production models, the outer cylinders drove the second coupled axle. Even when they were converted to the standard configuration, the twin-axle drive was retained. One of these engines went to Poland after the First World War; the others were given numbers 17 203 and 17 204 by the Deutsche Reichsbahn.

In 1925, locomotive 17 206 was given a Schmidt-Hartmann high-pressure boiler with a boiler overpressure of 5.884 MPa (58.84 bar), and the drive was converted to a compound configuration. The increased performance of the H 17 206 designated locomotive compared with the production design did not justify the higher construction costs however; the engine was converted back to the standard design in 1929 and retired in 1936.

The two locomotives with running numbers 17 236 and 17 239 were given a medium-pressure boiler in 1933 with a boiler overpressure of 2.452 MPa (24.52 bar), and they were also converted to compound operation at the same time. The performance of these converted engines matched that of the DRG Class 03 and they were employed together with the Class 03s in scheduled services. After several cases of boiler damage, however, the boiler pressure had to be reduced to 16 bar (1.6 MPa) in order to avoid further problems. During the 1930s the two medium-pressure locomotives were reconverted again. Both engines survived the war and were retired together with the other S 10.2s in 1948.

== See also ==
- Prussian state railways
- List of Prussian locomotives and railcars
- List of preserved steam locomotives in Germany

== Sources ==
- Hütter, Ingo (2009). Die Dampflokomotiven der Baureihen 01 bis 45 der DRG, DRB, DB, und DR (in German). Werl: DGEG Medien. pp. 153–156, 158–162, 173–181. ISBN 978-3-937189-45-1.
- Weisbrod; Bäzold; Obermayer (1994). Das große Typenbuch deutscher Dampflokomotiven (in German). Transpress Verlag. ISBN 3-344-70751-5.
- Reuter, Wilhelm (1978). Rekordlokomotiven (in German). Motorbuch Verlag Stuttgart. ISBN 3-87943-582-0.
- Vandenberghen, J (1989). La guerre 1914 - 1918 et les locomotives "Armistice", 2. Description des locomotives K.P.E.V. (PDF) (in French). Brussels: SNCB. pp. 79–106.
- Wagner, Andreas; Bäzold, Dieter; Zschech, Rainer; Lüderitz, Ralph (1990). Lokomotiven preußischer Eisenbahnen, Schnellzug- und Personenzuglokomotiven (EFA 2.3.1) (in German). Düsseldorf: Alba. pp. 212–232, 322–324. ISBN 3-87094-133-2.
- Weisbrod, Manfred; Müller, Hans; Petznik, Wolfgang (1976). Dampflokomotiven deutscher Eisenbahnen, Baureihe 01–39 (EFA 1.1) (in German) (3rd ed.). Düsseldorf: Alba Buchverlag. pp. 107–114, 124–132. ISBN 3-87094-081-6.
