= Prussian G 9 (Mallet) =

Type and origin
- Builder: Grafenstaden
- Build date: 1893–1898
- Total produced: 27
Specifications
- Configuration
  - Whyte: 0-4-4-0
- Gauge: 1,435 mm (4 ft 8 1/2 in)
- Driver dia.: 1,250 mm (4 ft 1 1/4 in)
- Length
  - Over beams: 16,480 mm (54 ft 3/4 in)
- Axle load: 15.1 t (14.9 long tons; 16.6 short tons)
- Adhesive weight: 60.0 t (59.1 long tons; 66.1 short tons)
- Service weight: 60.0 t (59.1 long tons; 66.1 short tons)
- Water cap.: 12.0 m^{3} (2,600 imp gal; 3,200 US gal)
- Boiler pressure: 12 kgf/cm^{2} (1,180 kPa; 171 lbf/in^{2})
- Heating surface
  - Firebox: 1.94 m^{2} (20.9 sq ft)
  - Evaporative: 145.40 m^{2} (1,565.1 sq ft)
- Cylinders: 4
- High-pressure cylinder: 630 mm (24 13/16 in)
- Low-pressure cylinder: 400 or 420 mm (15 3/4 or 16 9/16 in)
- Piston stroke: 600 mm (23 5/8 in)
Performance figures
- Maximum speed: 45 km/h (28 mph)
Career
- Retired: 1922

The Prussian G 9 Mallet was a class of 27 German 0-4-4-0 Mallet tender locomotives of the Prussian state railways that were used to haul goods trains.

== Description ==
As an 0-4-4-0 Mallet locomotive, the G 9 has two drive assemblies, each with two driven axles and a pair of cylinders. The front group was designed as a bogie, the rear sat firmly in the frame. This arrangement made the locomotives particularly suitable for winding routes. The straight-line stability was initially not so good due to rolling movements, but was later improved through modifications. Due to the frequent leaks in the moving steam lines and their complex construction, they were very maintenance-intensive. Consequently, only 27 examples were purchased, which were built between 1893 and 1898 by Elsässische Maschinenbau-Gesellschaft Grafenstaden. The Grand Duchy of Baden State Railway acquired almost identical locomotives as their class VIIIc. The locomotives were equipped with a Prussian three-axle tender of the pr 3 T 12 type.

The locomotives were developed for the routes in the Eifel hills, the Moselle valley, in the Saarland and in Silesia. They were initially assigned to the Royal Railway Divisions (Königlichen Eisenbahn-Direktionen, KED) of Breslau, Essen, Kattowitz and Saarbrücken. In 1910, four locomotives were assigned to KED Breslau, ten to KED Kassel, eleven to KED Essen, and two to KED Kattowitz. In 1912, two of the Essen locomotives were stationed at the depot (Bahnbetriebswerk, Bw) Thorn-Mocker in KED Bromberg. The first locomotive retirements were in 1912/13, the last were withdrawn during World War I.
