= Prussian G 1 =

Class of 93 German 0-4-0 locomotives

Type and origin
- Builder: Schwartzkopf; Hanomag; Hohenzollern; Wöhlert; Schichau-Werke; Borsig; Henschel & Sohn
- Build date: 1878–1879 / 1887–1898
- Total produced: 93
Specifications
- Driver dia.: 1,350 mm (4 ft 5 1/8 in)
- Length
  - Over beams: 13,175 or 13,353 mm (43 ft 2 3/4 in or 43 ft 9 3/4 in)
- Axle load: 13.35 or 12.95 t (13.14 or 12.75 long tons; 14.72 or 14.27 short tons)
- Adhesive weight: 26.7 or 25.9 t (26.3 or 25.5 long tons; 29.4 or 28.5 short tons)
- Service weight: 26.7 or 25.9 t (26.3 or 25.5 long tons; 29.4 or 28.5 short tons)
- Water cap.: 8.0 m^{3} (8,000 L; 1,800 imp gal; 2,100 US gal)
- Boiler pressure: 10.0 or 12.0 bar (10.2 or 12.2 kgf/cm^{2}; 1.00 or 1.20 MPa; 145 or 174 lbf/in^{2})
- Heating surface
  - Firebox: 1.46 or 1.45 m^{2} (15.7 or 15.6 sq ft)
  - Radiative: 5.6 or 5.7 m^{2} (60 or 61 sq ft)
  - Tubes: 89.5 or 87.1 m^{2} (963 or 938 sq ft)
  - Evaporative: 94.1 or 92.8 m^{2} (1,013 or 999 sq ft)
- Cylinders: 2
- Cylinder size: 420 or 375 mm (16 9/16 or 14 3/4 in)
- Piston stroke: 610 or 630 mm (24 or 24 13/16 in)
Performance figures
- Maximum speed: 45 km/h (28 mph)
Career
- Retired: by early 1920s

The Prussian G 1 was a class of 0-4-0 goods locomotive of the Prussian States Railways. The original design came from the Prussian Eastern Railway. The long branch lines required tender locomotives, as tank locomotives could not carry sufficient coal and water. A total of 44 locomotives of this type were delivered to the Prussian Eastern Railway in 1878 and 1879.

After the establishment of the Prussian State Railways, a need for more locomotives of this type was identified. Therefore, between 1887 and 1898, another 49 locomotives of this type were ordered. In 1905, these locomotives received the classification G 1, and were renumbered into the 3001–3050 number block. The differences between the two delivery series were minor.

The Deutsche Reichsbahn did not include any of these locomotives in their renumbering plan; the last of the type was retired in the early 1920s.

The locomotives were couples to type 2 T 8 tenders.
