= Prussian G 2 =

Type and origin
- Builder: Henschel, Union
- Build date: 1888 - 1901
- Total produced: 45
Specifications
- Configuration
  - Whyte: 0-4-2
  - UIC: B1
- Driver dia.: 1,550/1,580 mm
- Trailing dia.: 1,130 mm
- Length
  - Over beams: 14,212 / 14,970 mm
- Axle load: 13.9 t
- Adhesive weight: 27.7 t
- Service weight: 37.2 t
- Water cap.: 8,0 / 10.5 m^{2}
- Boiler pressure: 12 bar
- Heating surface
  - Firebox: 1.82 m^{2}
  - Evaporative: 103.5 m^{2}
- Cylinders: 2
- Cylinder size: 420 mm
- Piston stroke: 600 mm
Performance figures
- Maximum speed: 65 km/h
Career
- Retired: early 1920s

The Prussian Class G 2 was allocated by the Prussian state railways to a number of older, 0-4-2 and 0-6-0 goods train locomotives which it had taken over from its predecessor railway companies. In addition it included a number of Prussian G 3 engines of the type operated by the Frankfurt/M and Mainz railway divisions. The best known was the standard G 2 type.

== Prussian G 2 (standard type) ==
In 1888/89 the Marsch Railway (Marschbahn) in Schleswig-Holstein procured a total of eleven locomotives for mixed traffic on branch lines, which were an evolutionary development of an older locomotive class from 1875. The engines were described as scissors locomotives (Scherenlokomotiven) because the second axle was directly driven and the first axle coupled. That meant that the connecting rods and coupling rods looked as if they were sliding across one another like a pair of scissors. The trailing axle and low-pitched firebox gave the engine good riding qualities. The design also meant that the wheel guards (Radkästen) did not extend into the driver's cab and that the latter was protected from the vibration of a driven axle.

Because the class gave a good account of itself, the Prussian state railways procured another ten of these locomotives after the acquisition of the Marschbahn in 1890, of which two were deployed to the Magdeburg division and the remainder were stationed at Altona. The East Prussian Southern Railway, taken over by the Prussian state railways in 1903, also ordered 24 of these engines between 1890 and 1901, for which a template (Musterblatt) based on Prussian norms had been prepared. The locomotives were used in charge of goods trains as well as passenger services. As a result, they were allocated to various classes from 1905: The Altona engines were classified as G 2's, the Königsberg ones as P 2's and the Magdeburg locos as P 3's (later being reclassed as G 2's). The Deutsche Reichsbahn took over about 30 locomotives, but they were then retired by 1923, so that they were never given Reichsbahn locomotive numbers.

The machines were coupled with Class 2 T 8 and 3 T 10.5 tenders.

== See also ==
- Prussian state railways
- List of Prussian locomotives and railbuses
