= Prussian S 6 =

Class of German steam locomotives

Prussian S 6 DRG Class 13.10–12 PKP Pd 5 SNCB Type 66
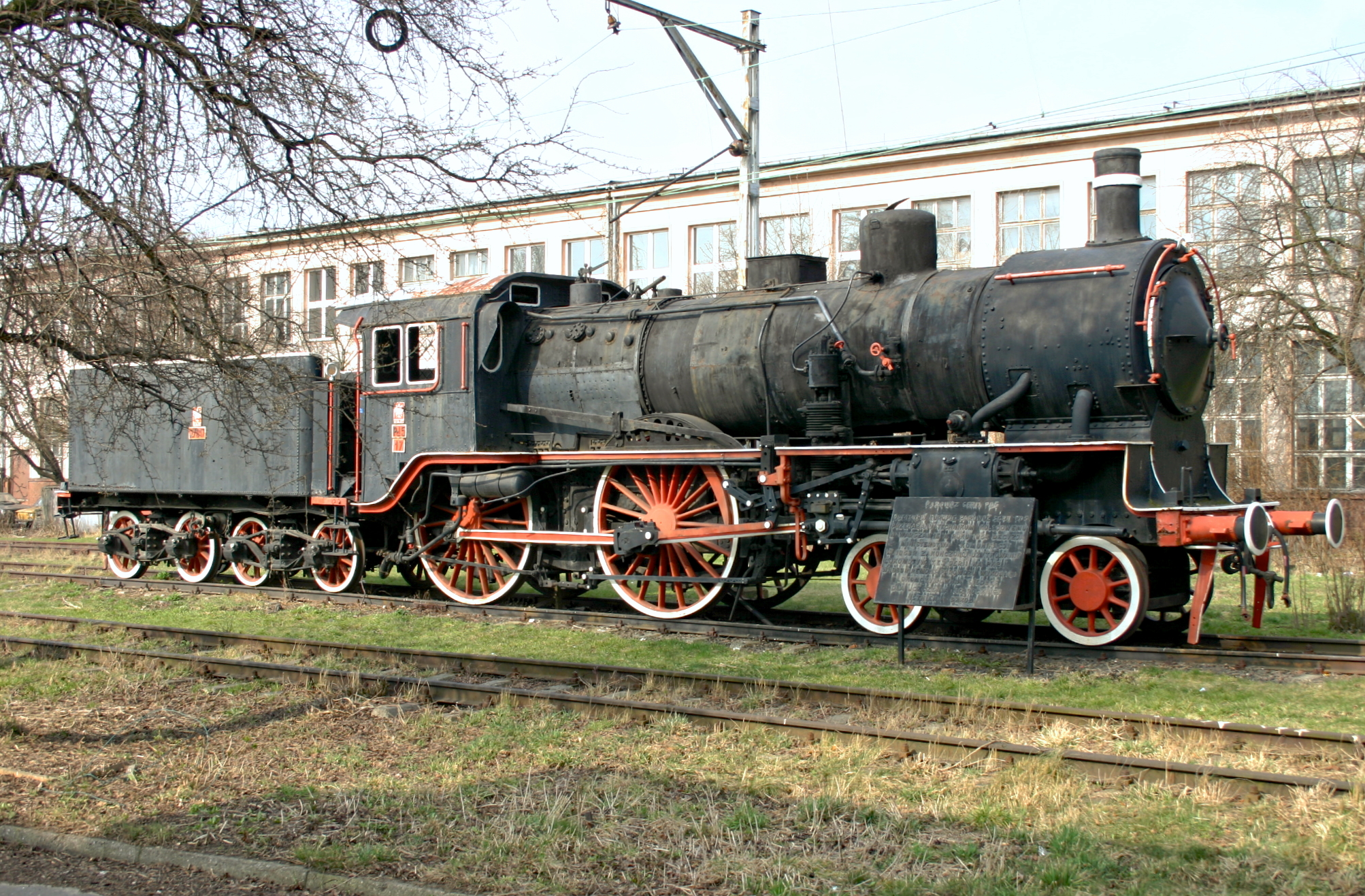
- Pd 5-17
Type and origin
- Builder: Linke-Hofmann (330); Henschel (173), Humboldt (81)
- Build date: 1906–1913
- Total produced: 584
Specifications
- Configuration
  - Whyte: 4-4-0
  - German: 2 24.18
- Gauge: 1,435 mm (4 ft 8 1/2 in) standard gauge
- Leading dia.: 1,000 mm (39.37 in)
- Driver dia.: 2,100 mm (82.68 in)
- Length
  - Over beams: 18,350 mm (60 ft 2.4 in)
- Axle load: 17.6 t (17.3 long tons; 19.4 short tons)
- Adhesive weight: 34.7 t (34.2 long tons; 38.3 short tons)
- Service weight: 60.6 t (59.6 long tons; 66.8 short tons)
- Water cap.: 21.5 m^{3} (4,700 imp gal; 5,700 US gal)
- Boiler pressure: 12 bar (1,200 kPa; 170 psi)
- Heating surface
  - Firebox: 2.35 m^{2} (25.3 sq ft)
  - Evaporative: 136.98 m^{2} (1,474.4 sq ft)
- Superheater
  - Heating area: 40.32 m^{2} (434.0 sq ft)
- Cylinders: 2
- Cylinder size: 550 mm (21.65 in)
- Piston stroke: 630 mm (24.80 in)
Performance figures
- Maximum speed: 110 km/h (68 mph)
- Indicated power: 679 kW (911 hp)
Career
- Numbers: DRG 13 1001–1286
- Retired: 1931

The Prussian S 6 (later DRG Class 13.10–12) was a class of German steam locomotive with a 4-4-0 wheel arrangement operated by the Prussian state railways for express train services.

== Development ==
After the Prussian steam locomotive classes S 4 and S 5 proved less than fully satisfactory, there was a requirement in Prussia for faster and more powerful express locomotives. To that end the Head of the Locomotive Design and Procurement Department, Robert Garbe, proposed to the Locomotive Committee in 1904 a design by Linke-Hofmann of Breslau for a 4-4-0 superheated, express train locomotive. This was an evolutionary development of the Prussian Class S 4 that also had a 4-4-0 configuration. In putting this forward, Garbe was especially keen to prove the superiority of his design compared with the four-cylinder, saturated steam, compound locomotives, particularly its predecessor, the Prussian Class S 7.

In 1905/1906 Garbe pushed through the construction of the S 6. Between 1906 and 1913 a total of 584 units were manufactured by Linke-Hofmann, Henschel-Werke and the Maschinenbauanstalt Humboldt in Cologne. They were the last four-coupled, express locomotives to be built in Germany and, for a long time, were the most economical locomotives in the Prussian state railways.

== Design features ==
The design initially caused major difficulties, because it had to keep to the maximum permitted axle load for the railway network of 16 t (15.7 long tons; 17.6 short tons).

This limitation led to the weight savings in many areas. At first, the plate frame was made of 22 mm (0.87 in) thick material; this later had to be changed to the usual 25 mm (0.98 in). On the first few engines, a smokebox superheater was installed, but the design this was changed during the first year in favour of a Schmidt smoke tube superheater. The long boiler was located well forward in order to spread the weight to the front carrying wheels and to keep the axle load within the maximum limits, thus giving the engine the typical appearance of a "Garbe locomotive".

The driving wheels of the S6 had the rather unusual diameter of 2,100 mm (82.68 in) in order to keep the rpm down and to guarantee the smooth running of the driving gear. Originally a diameter of 2,200 mm (86.61 in) had been planned, but in the end, it was reduced by 100 mm (3.94 in). The heavy balancing masses of the driving gear were badly affected by weight savings. That resulted in serious jerkiness when running. A remedy was achieved by coupling the tender closer to the locomotive and thus raising the compression of the buffer springs.

Not until the lines were upgraded in 1910 to take a 17-tonne (16.7-long-ton; 18.7-short-ton) axle load, could the necessary reinforcing measures be taken. The S 6 then became the heaviest 4-4-0 locomotive on continental Europe, even outweighing the subsequently built four-cylinder, saturated steam locomotives of Class S 7.

The driver's cab was initially built with a tapered front and conical smokebox doors in order to reduce wind resistance. An unfortunate side effect of the streamlined driver's cab, however, was that the engine crew were dazzled at night by reflections from the diagonally oriented front windowpanes. From 1908/1909 the cab was built with a flat front.

The locomotives were equipped with Prussian Class pr 2’2’ T 21.5 tenders.

== Performance ==
The S 6 achieved its highest indicated power of 1,160 PS (870 kW or 1,170 hp) at a speed of 100 km/h (62 mph). On the level it could haul a train of 500 tonnes (490 long tons; 550 short tons) (the equivalent of 13 eight-wheeled D-Zug coaches) at a continuous speed of 90 km/h (56 mph). On engines with a feedwater preheater the performance was about 10% higher.

== Distribution ==
Initial allocation of S 6
Division	Quantity of S6	Division	Quantity of S6	Division	Quantity of S6
Altona	70	Elberfeld	23	Kattowitz	21
Breslau	44	Erfurt	17	Magdeburg	41
Bromberg	31	Essen	31	Mainz	9
Cassel	10	Frankfurt	5	Münster	45
Coeln	27	Halle	68	Posen	35
Danzig	21	Hannover	42	Stettin	44

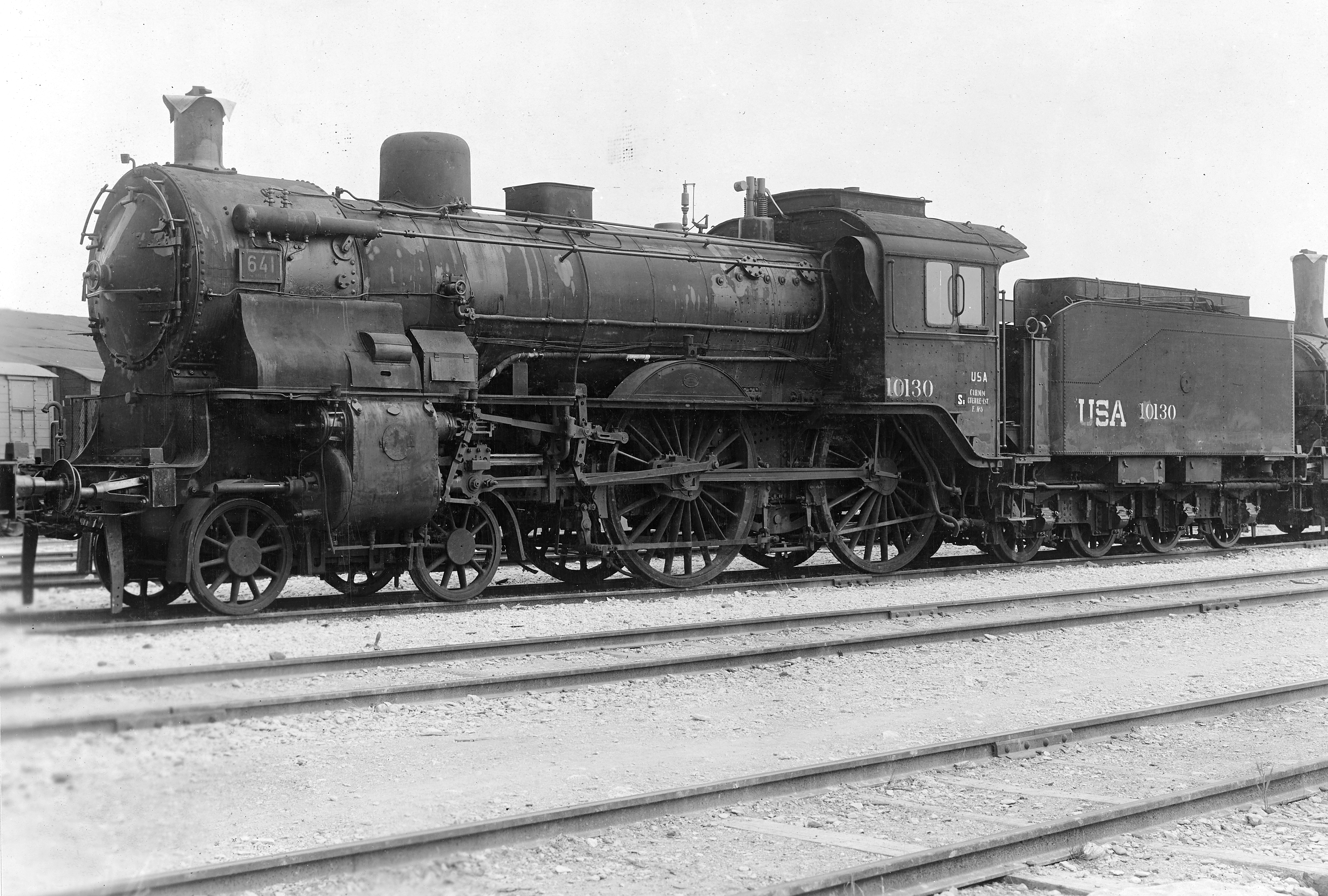
641 Halle at Camp Williams, Is-sur-Tille, France, in June 1919. This one would become locomotive 6641 of the Belgian State Railways and ran until 1949.

Apart from the divisions of Berlin and Königsberg (other sources also name Saarbrücken), the S 6 was procured by all the Prussian railway divisions S 6. There were only a few transfers.

After the First World War the S 6 was employed in express train duties (on the Leipzig–Dresden, Berlin–Dresden and other lines) as well as in passenger train services. Many of the engines were rehomed at Dresden.

== Preserved locomotives ==
From 1912 the S 6 was ousted from heavy express train services by the S 10.

In the 1923 DRG renumbering plan for steam locomotives, 442 S 6 engines were listed for renumbering into the 13 1001 to 13 1442 series. In the third and final renumbering plan only 286 engines were listed: numbers 13 1001 to 13 1286. The last engines in Germany were retired between 1926 and 1931.

After World War I, 81 locomotives were handed over to Poland (class Pd5), 42 to Belgium (type 66), two to Italy (class 553) and one to Lithuania as reparations.

The engines in those countries survived considerably longer in service; in Belgium they were not retired until 1949.

During the Second World War, a total of 56 S 6 came back into the Reichsbahn fleet from Poland as numbers 13 501-556.

One S 6 has been preserved in Warsaw (Poland).

== See also ==
- Prussian state railways
- List of Prussian locomotives and railcars
- List of preserved steam locomotives in Germany
