= Prussian S 3 =

Prussian S 3 DRG Class 13.0
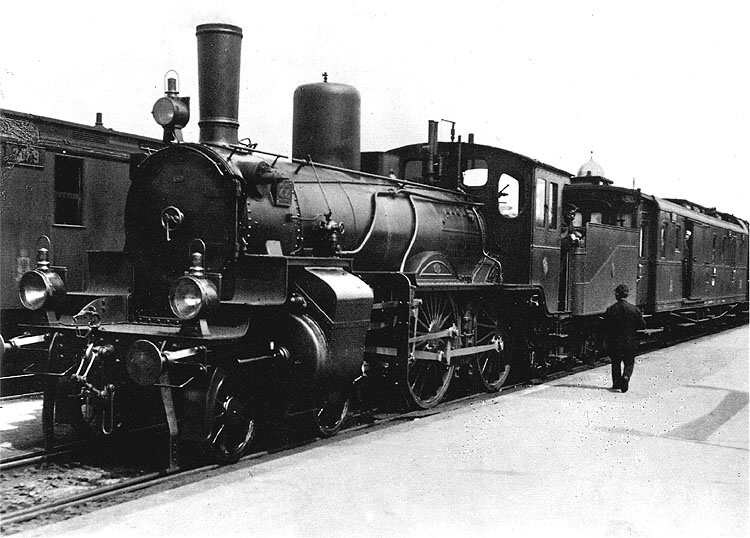
- Prussian S3 photographed in 1895 at Berlin-Charlottenburg
Type and origin
- Builder: Hanomag (213); Berliner Maschinenbau (185); Borsig (84); Grafenstaden (75); Henschel & Sohn (94); Schichau-Werke (132); Union Gießerei (93); AG Vulcan Stettin (153)
- Build date: 1893–1904
- Total produced: 1027
Specifications
- Configuration
  - Whyte: 4-4-0
  - German: S 24.16
- Gauge: 1,435 mm (4 ft 8 1/2 in)
- Leading dia.: 1,000 mm (39 3/8 in)
- Driver dia.: 1,980 mm (78 in)
- Length
  - Over beams: 17,561 mm (57 ft 7 1/2 in)
- Axle load: 15.6 t (15.4 long tons; 17.2 short tons)
- Adhesive weight: 30.9 t (30.4 long tons; 34.1 short tons)
- Service weight: 50.5 t (49.7 long tons; 55.7 short tons)
- Water cap.: 15.0 m^{3} (530 cu ft); 16.0 m^{3} (570 cu ft); 20.0 m^{3} (710 cu ft); 21.5 m^{3} (760 cu ft)
- Boiler pressure: 12 kgf/cm^{2} (1,180 kPa; 171 psi)
- Heating surface
  - Firebox: 2.32 m^{2} (25.0 sq ft)
  - Evaporative: 117.70 m^{2} (1,266.9 sq ft)
- Cylinders: Two, outside
- High-pressure cylinder: 460 mm (18 1/8 in)
- Low-pressure cylinder: 680 mm (26 3/4 in)
- Piston stroke: 600 mm (23 5/8 in)
Performance figures
- Maximum speed: 100 km/h (62 mph)
Career
- Numbers: DRG 13 002–028
- Retired: 1927

The Prussian Class S 3s were saturated steam locomotives developed by Hanomag for the Prussian state railways and were built from 1893.

== Design ==
They were a further development of the S 2 and used the same boiler. The "S" stood for Schnellzuglokomotive, or express locomotive, of which the S 3 was a large and powerful type. Because larger turntables with a 16-metre diameter were then being built, the wheelbase could be longer, which gave it better riding qualities. The locomotive had one high-pressure and one low-pressure cylinder, coupled to four driving wheels in a 4-4-0 configuration.

They were the first class of locomotives to use superheating, a process in which the steam leaving the boiler is re-heated, resulting in better efficiency.

== Procurement ==
The railway procured a total of 1,027 locomotives of this class up to 1904, and they were stabled at almost all locomotive depots (Betriebswerk or Bw), making them the most numerous German express train locomotives. In addition, several hundred units were manufactured with smaller driving wheels - dubbed the P4 class.

Another 40 examples went to the Imperial Railways in Alsace-Lorraine (see Alsace-Lorraine S 3) and six units, with a modified axle base, to the Grand Duchy of Oldenburg State Railways (see Oldenburg S 3).

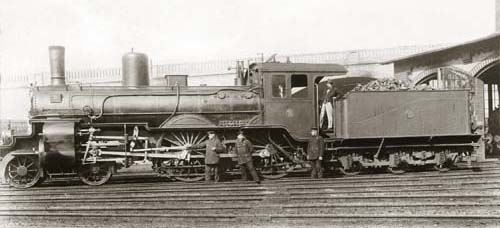
Locomotive "S3 Stettin 9" (BMAG 2374/1897) around 1905 in Bw Berlin-Gesundbrunnen

== Reichsbahn Era ==
Whilst the Deutsche Reichsbahn still listed 451 Prussian S 3 engines in its 1923 renumbering plan (as 13 008 - 458), only 27 of them were left in 1925. They were grouped as DRG Class 13.0 with operating numbers 13 002–028. Locomotive 13 001 was not an S 3, but a Prussian S 2 converted into an Erfurt-type compound locomotive. The machines were retired by 1927.

The Oldenburg State Railway locomotives were allocated numbers 13 1801–1806 in 1925, but were retired only a year later.

After the First World War over 100 engines were left with the Polish (PKP) and Lithuanian Railways where some were still in service in the 1940s. Some were incorporated into the Reichsbahn fleet during the Second World War as 13 010, 301, 302, 305 - 337, 339 and 340. Several of these locomotives were in the East German Deutsche Reichsbahn until 1955 and were then returned to Poland.

The locomotives were equipped with Prussian 3 T 15, 2'2' T 16, 2'2' T 20 and 2'2' T 21.5 tenders.

== See also ==
- List of DRG locomotives and railbuses
- List of preserved steam locomotives in Germany
- List of Prussian locomotives and railbuses
- Prussian state railways
