= DRG renumbering plan for steam locomotives =

In 1922, the Deutsche Reichsbahn began to develop a renumbering plan to standardize the numbering of steam locomotives that had been taken over from the state railways (Länderbahnen). Its basis was the corresponding DRG classification system.

The first renumbering plan in 1922 envisaged more class numbers than the later plans. The development of this scheme was discontinued because it was seen that there would be problems in practically adopting it.

The second, provisional, renumbering plan of 25 July 1923 was very like the final version of 1925 in its basic structure. It incorporated space for the new standard locomotives (Einheitslokomotiven) that were planned. The third and final renumbering plan of 1925 differed from its predecessor primarily in that all the locomotives retired up to that point—in some cases entire classes—were deleted; in addition, several mistakes in the numbering were corrected.

With the exception of Bavarian classes, new locomotives built after 1923 were delivered from the outset with their new operating numbers. The actual renumbering of older engines did not begin until 1926.

Locomotives that were seen as obsolete and which would therefore soon be retired were given serial numbers from 7001 after their class number.

== Express train locomotives ==
Original operating numbers 1923 - 2nd renumbering plan	Final operating numbers 1925 renumbering plan	State railway class	Remarks
12 7001 - 7004		Prussian S 1	
13 002 - 007	13 001	Prussian S 3	Rebuild of a S 2 to a compound locomotive
13 008 - 457	13 002 - 028	Prussian S 3	
13 501 - 544	13 501 - 504	Prussian S 4	
13 601 -647*, 651 - 904	13 651 - 850	Prussian S 5.2	* Wrongly thought to be S 5.1s and so grouped into their own number range
13 1001 - 1442	13 1001 - 1286	Prussian S 6	
13 1501 - 1512	13 1501 - 1511	Saxon VIII V1	Built 1900
13 1601 - 1697	13 1601 - 1624	Württemberg AD	
13 1701 - 1714	13 1701 - 1714	Württemberg ADh	
13 1801 - 1806	13 1801 - 1806	Oldenburg S 3	
13 1851 - 1861	13 1851 - 1861	Oldenburg S 5.2	
13 7001 - 7020	13 7001 - 7012	Saxon VIII 2	
13 7101 - 7120	13 7101 - 7112	Saxon VIII V1	Built 1896/97
14 001, 002	14 001, 002	Prussian S 8	Rebuild of S 9 into superheated steam version
14 031 - 081	14 031	Prussian S 9	
14 101 - 112	14 101 - 105	Palatine P 3.I	
14 121		Palatine P 3.II	
14 131, 132		Bavarian S 2/5 (Baldwin)	Vauclain compounds
14 141 - 150	14 141 - 145	Bavarian S 2/5	
14 151 - 161	14 141 - 145	Palatine P 4	
14 201 - 215	14 201 - 215	Saxon X V	
14 301 - 318	14 301 - 317	Saxon X H1	
14 401 - 403, 451 - 454		Baden II d	
15 001	15 001	Bavarian S 2/6	
16 001 - 003	16 001 - 003	Oldenburg S 10	
17 001 - 127	17 001 - 135	Prussian S 10	
17 201 - 292	17 201 - 296	Prussian S 10.2	
17 301 - 326	17 301 - 322	Bavarian C V	
17 401 - 420	17 401 - 420	Bavarian S 3/5N	
17 501 - 524	17 501 - 524	Bavarian S 3/5H	
17 601 - 606	17 601 - 606	Saxon XII H	
17 701 - 734, 751 - 755	17 701 - 734, 751 - 755	Saxon XII HV	
17 801 - 804	17 801 - 804	Saxon XII H1	
17 1001 - 1208	17 1001 - 1209	Prussian S 10.1	1911 and 1914 versions
18 001 - 010	18 001 - 010	Saxon XVIII H	
18 101 - 137	18 101 - 137	Württemberg C	
18 201...258	18 201...256	Baden IV f	Not all numbers were utilised
18 301 - 303, 311 - 319, 321 - 328	18 301 - 303, 311 - 319, 321 - 328	Baden IV h	
18 401 - 447, 451 - 463, 471 - 480	18 401 - 434, 441 - 458, 461 - 508	Bavarian S 3/6, Palatine S 3/6	18 509 - 548 were follow-on orders by the DRG
19 001 - 023	19 001 - 023	Saxon XX HV	

== Passenger train locomotives ==
Original operating numbers 1923 - 2nd renumbering plan	Final operating numbers 1925 renumbering plan	State railway class	Remarks
33 7001 - 7007		Oldenburg P 3.2	
34 7001 - 7012		Prussian P 3.1	
34 7101 - 7134		Prussian P 3.2	
34 7201 - 7204		Mecklenburg P 2	
34 7301 - 7318, 7354 - 7366, 7370 - 7377	34 7301 - 7308, 7351 - 7364	Mecklenburg P 3.1	
34 7351 - 7353		Mecklenburg P 3.2	Ex Prussian P 3.2, transferred in 1920 to Mecklenburg
34 7401, 7402		Palatine P 1.I	
34 7411 - 7415		Palatine P 1.III	
34 7421 - 7440		Bavarian B IX	
34 7451		Palatine P 1.II	
34 7461, 7462		Bavarian B VI	
34 7501 - 7513		Bavarian B X	
34 7601 - 7604, 7611 - 7633	34 7611	Saxon III	
34 7701 - 7882	34 7701, 7702, 7721 - 7807	Saxon IIIb	
34 7901 - 7918	34 7901, 7902	Saxon IIIb V	
34 8001 - 8003		Saxon VI	
34 8011 - 8023	34 8011	Saxon VIb V	
34 8101 - 8123	34 8101, 8102	Württemberg A	
34 8131 - 8134		Württemberg Ab	
34 8201 - 8231	34 8201 - 8209	Württemberg Ac	
35 7001 - 7020		Palatine P 2.I	
36 001 - 002	36 001	Prussian P 4.2	Rebuild of P 4.1, Erfurt version, to compound working
36 003 - 540	36 002 - 438	Prussian P 4.2	Standard version
36 601 - 626, 651 - 662	36 601 - 620, 651 - 662	Mecklenburg P 4.2	
36 701 - 731	36 701 - 708	Bavarian B XI Zw	Two-cylinder locomotive
36 751 - 850	36 751 - 826	Bavarian B XI Vb	Compound locomotive
	36 861	Bavarian P 2/4	Not included in the second renumbering plan
36 901 - 919, 921 - 1018	36 901 - 919, 921 - 948, 951 - 1014	Saxon VIII V2	
36 1101-1106		Baden II c	Built 1900
36 1201 - 1219	36 1201 - 1219	Oldenburg P 4.1	
36 1251 - 1258	36 1251 - 1258	Oldenburg P 4.2	
36 7001, 7002		Prussian P 4.1	Erfurt version
36 7003 - 7168	36 7001 - 7009	Prussian P 4.1	Standard version (so-called Hannover version)
36 7201, 7202		Mecklenburg P 4.1	Ex Prussian P 4.1, transferred in 1920 to Mecklenburg
36 7301 - 7303, 7311 - 7314, 7321 - 7323		Baden II a	
36 7331 - 7335		Baden II b	
36 7351, 7361 - 7371, 7381, 7382		Baden II c	Built 1892 - 1897
37 001 - 151	37 001 - 163	Prussian P 6	
38 001 - 013	38 001 - 013	Bavarian P 3/5 N	
38 101 - 108		Württemberg D	
38 201 - 324	38 201 - 324	Saxon XII H2	38 325 - 334 were follow-on orders by the DRG
38 401 - 480	38 401 - 480	Bavarian P 3/5 H	
38 1001 - 3825, 3951 - 4051	38 1001 - 3832, 3951 - 4051	Prussian P 8, Mecklenburg P 8, Oldenburg P 8, Baden P 8	
38 7001...7080	38 7001...7073	Baden IV e	Not all numbers were utilised
39 001 - 209	39 001 - 230	Prussian P 10	39 231 - 260 were follow-on orders by the DRG

== Goods train locomotives ==
Original operating numbers 1923 - 2nd renumbering plan	Final operating numbers 1925 renumbering plan	State railway class	Remarks
51 7001 - 7019		Oldenburg G 1	
52 7001 - 7006	52 7001	Saxon IIIb	
52 7101		Württemberg B 3	
53 001 - 297	53 001 - 025	Prussian G 4.2	
53 301 - 337	53 301 - 327	Prussian G 4.3	
53 401 - 405, 451		Mecklenburg G 4.2	
53 501 - 504		Palatine G 3/3	
53 601 - 740, 751	53 601 - 729, 751	Saxon V V	53 751 was a follow-on order with a different boiler
53 801-898	53 801 - 865	Württemberg Fc	
53 901-926		Baden VII d	Built 1901/02
53 1001 - 1011, 1051–1058	53 1001 - 1011, 1051–1058	Oldenburg G 4.2	
53 7001 - 7522	53 7001 - 7157	Prussian G 3	
53 7601 - 7692	53 7601 - 7617	Prussian G 4.1	
53 7701 - 7705		Mecklenburg G 3	
53 7801 - 7821		Palatine G 2.I	
53 7831 - 7833		Bavarian C III	Sigl version
53 7834 - 7868		Bavarian C III	Ex Bavarian Ostbahn
53 7871 - 7990		Bavarian C III	
53 7991 - 8009		Palatine G 2.II	
53 8011 - 8080	53 8011 - 8076	Bavarian C IV Zw	Two-cylinder locomotive
53 8081 - 8170	53 8081 - 8168	Bavarian C IV Vb	Compound locomotive
53 8201 - 8294	53 8201 - 8211	Saxon V	
53 8301 - 8387	53 8301	Württemberg F 2	
53 8401-8411		Württemberg F 1	
53 8451, 8452		Württemberg F 1c	
53 8501 - 8596	53 8501...8586	Baden VII a	Last number range was not fully utilised
53 8597 - 8599	53 8587, 8597, 8598	Baden VII c	
53 8601 - 8665		Baden VII d	Built 1893 - 1899
54 001 - 193	54 001 - 071	Prussian G 5.1	
54 201 - 517	54 201 - 386	Prussian G 5.2	53 368 - 386 and other ex-Alsace-Lorraine G 5.2
54 601 - 708	54 601 - 671	Prussian G 5.3	
54 801 - 1156	54 801 - 1092	Prussian G 5.4	
54 1201 - 1204	54 1201 - 1203	Mecklenburg G 5.4	
54 1301 - 1359	54 1301 - 1364	Bavarian C VI	
54 1401 - 1427	54 1401 - 1432	Bavarian G 3/4 N	
54 1501 - 1725	54 1501 - 1725	Bavarian G 3/4 H	
55 001 - 680	55 001 - 660	Prussian G 7.1	
55 701 - 1533	55 701 - 1392	Prussian G 7.2	
55 1601 - 2266	55 1601 - 2256	Prussian G 8	
55 2301 - 2432	55 2301 - 2433	Prussian G 9	
55 2501 - 5667	55 2501 - 3366, 3367 - 5622	Prussian G 8.1	
55 5701 - 5705	55 5701 - 5705	Mecklenburg G 7.2	
55 5801 - 5810, 5851 - 5852	55 5801 - 5810, 5851 - 5852	Mecklenburg G 8.1	
55 5901 - 5922	55 5901 - 5922	Palatine G 5	
55 6001 - 6023	55 6001 - 6013	Saxon I V	
55 6101 - 6119		Baden VIII c	
55 6201 - 6213	55 6201 - 6213	Oldenburg G 7	
55 7001-7006		Palatine G 3	
55 7101, 7102		Bavarian BB I Palatine G 4.II	
55 7201 - 7215	55 7201 - 7215	Palatine G 4.I	
56 001 - 005	56 001 - 005	Prussian G 7.3	
56 101 - 185	56 101 - 185	Prussian G 8.3	
56 201 - 205	56 201 - 205	Mecklenburg G 7.3	
56 301 - 353		Bavarian E I	
56 401 - 404	56 401 - 404	Bavarian G 4/5 N	
56 501 - 516	56 501 - 516	Saxon IX V	
56 601 - 625	56 601 - 625	Saxon IX HV	
56 701...785	56 701...785	Baden VIII e	Not all numbers were utilised
56 801 - 809, 901 - 1034, 1101–1125	56 801 - 809, 901 - 1035, 1101–1125	Bavarian G 4/5 H	
56 2001 - 2485	56 2001 - 2485, 2551 - 2905	Prussian G 8.2, Oldenburg G 8.2	56 2906 - 2916 were follow-on orders by the DRG
57 001 - 014, 021 - 083	57 001 - 014, 021 - 083	Saxon XI V	
57 101 - 105	57 101 - 105	Saxon XI H	
57 201 - 218	57 201 - 218	Saxon XI HV	
57 301 - 304	57 301 - 304	Württemberg H	
57 401 - 417	57 401 - 417	Württemberg Hh	
57 501 - 508, 511 - 590	57 501 - 507, 511 - 590	Bavarian G 5/5	
57 1001 - 1394, 1396 - 2740, 2892 - 3100	57 1001 - 2726, 2892 - 3524	Prussian G 10	
58 001 - 015	58 001 - 015	Prussian G 12.1	
58 101 - 114	58 101 - 114	Saxon XIII H	Built 1917, like the Prussian G 12.1
58 201...318	58 201...318	Baden G 12	Not all numbers were utilised
58 401 - 462	58 401 - 462	Saxon XIII H	Built 1919 - 1924, wie Prussian G 12
58 501 - 543	58 501 - 543	Württemberg G 12	
58 1001	58 1001	Prussian G 12	Built for the CFOA (Turkey), taken over by Prussia
58 1002 - 2143	58 1002 - 2143	Prussian G 12	
59 001 - 034	59 001 - 044	Württemberg K	

== Passenger train tank locomotives ==
Original operating numbers 1923 - 2nd renumbering plan	Final operating numbers 1925 renumbering plan	State railway class	Remarks
69 7001 - 7003*		Prussian T 4.2	* 69 7001, 7002 wrongly classed as T 4 of the 2nd Berlin variant
70 001 - 097	70 001 - 097	Bavarian Pt 2/3	
70 101 - 105, 111 - 125	70 101 - 105, 111 - 125	Baden I g	70 126 - 133 were follow-on orders by the DRG
70 7001		Prussian T 4	1. Magdeburg variant
70 7002 - 7004, 7015 - 7016		Prussian T 4	2nd Berlin variant
70 7005 - 7014, 7017 - 7033, 7036 - 7038		Prussian T 4.1	
70 7034, 7035		Prussian T 4.3	
70 7101 - 7155	70 7101 - 7154	Bavarian D IX	
71 001 - 116*	71 001 - 026	Prussian T 5.1	* 71 019, 020, 029 - 031 wrongly classed T 5.2
71 201 - 212	71 201 - 212	Bavarian Pt 2/4 H	
71 301 - 391	71 301 - 385	Saxon IV T	
71 401 - 420	71 401 - 420	Oldenburg T 5.1	
71 7001 - 7005		Baden IV d	
72 001 - 016*	72 001, 002	Prussian T 5.2	* 72 016 wrongly classed T 5.1
72 101, 102	72 101, 102	Bavarian Pt 2/4 N	
73 001 - 028	73 001 - 028	Palatine P 2.II	
73 031 - 124	73 031 - 125	Bavarian D XII	73 125 ex Alsace-Lorraine T 5
73 131 - 139	73 131 - 139	Bavarian Pt 2/5 N	
73 201	73 201	Bavarian Pt 2/5 H	
74 001 - 368	74 001 - 358	Prussian T 11	
74 401 - 1396	74 401 - 543, 545 - 1300	Prussian T 12	
75 001 - 093	75 001 - 093	Württemberg T 5	
75 101...302	75 101...302	Baden VI b	Not all numbers were utilised
75 401...494	75 401...494	Baden VI c	Built 1914 - 1918, Not all numbers were utilised
75 501 - 505, 511 - 588	75 501 - 505, 511 - 588	Saxon XIV HT	
75 1001 - 1023, 1101–1120	75 1001 - 1023, 1101–1120	Baden VI c	Built 1920/21
76 001 - 011	76 001 - 011	Prussian T 10	
77 001 - 012	77 001 - 012	Palatine P 5	
77 101 - 129	77 101 - 129	Palatine Pt 3/6, Bavarian Pt 3/6	
78 001 - 281, 321 - 371	78 001 - 282, 351 - 523	Prussian T 18, Württemberg T 18	78 524 - 528 were follow-on orders by the DRG
79 001, 002	79 001, 002	Saxon XV HTV	

== Goods train tank locomotives ==
Original operating numbers 1923 - 2nd renumbering plan	Final operating numbers 1925 renumbering plan	State railway class	Remarks
88 7001 - 7003		Palatine T 2.I	
88 7011 - 7017		Bavarian D I	
88 7021 - 7026		Bavarian D IV	ex-Bavarian Ostbahn
88 7101 - 7232	88 7101 - 7201	Bavarian D IV	
88 7301 - 7331	88 7301 - 7321	Palatine T 1	
88 7401	88 7401	Württemberg T	
88 7501 - 7503	88 7501 - 7503	Baden I b	
88 7511...7563	88 7511...7563	Baden I e	Not all numbers were utilised
89 001 - 080	89 001 - 078	Prussian T 8	
89 101 - 121	89 101 - 121	Palatine T 3	
89 201 - 274	89 201 - 269	Saxon V T	Built 1896 - 1901
89 281 - 295	89 281 - 295	Saxon V T	Built 1914 - 1919
89 301 - 403	89 301 - 410	Württemberg T 3	
89 411 - 414	89 411	Württemberg T 3L	
89 501 - 506		Baden X a	
89 601 - 670	89 601 - 670	Bavarian D II	
89 701 - 717	89 701 - 717	Bavarian R 3/3	Built 1906 - 1913, same as the D II
89 801 - 890	89 801 - 890	Bavarian R 3/3	Built 1921 - 1922
89 7001 - 7745	89 7001 - 7511	Prussian T 3	
89 7801 - 7937	89 7801 - 7868	Prussian T 7	
89 8001 - 8045, 8050 - 8051	89 8001 - 8022, 8050 - 8051	Mecklenburg T 3a	
89 8053 - 8069	89 8053 - 8068	Mecklenburg T 3b	
89 8101 - 8110	89 8101 - 8110	Bavarian D V	
89 8201 - 8233, 8251 - 8272	89 8201 - 8221, 8251 - 8267	Saxon V T	Built 1872 - 1895
89 8301 - 8307	89 8301, 8302	Baden IX a	Former cog locomotives
90 001 - 328 (including T 9 and wrongly classed T 9.2)	90 001 - 115, 117 - 231*	Prussian T 9.1	* 90 022, 023, 123, 124 wrongly classed T 9.2
90 002, 003, 066, 067		Prussian T 9	Langenschwalbach version
90 154, 155, 167, 180 - 183, 351 - 363	90 116	Prussian T 9	Elberfeld version
91 001 - 162 (including the wrongly classed T 9.1)	91 001 - 115*	Prussian T 9.2	* 91 088, 089, 109 - 114 wrongly classed as T 9.1
91 301 - 1771 (including the wrongly classed T 9.1)	91 301 - 1805*	Prussian T 9.3	* 91 301, 302 wrongly classed T 9.1
91 1901 - 1950	91 1901 - 1950	Mecklenburg T 4	
91 2001 - 2010	91 2001 - 2010	Württemberg T 9	
92 001 - 011	92 001 - 011	Württemberg T 6	
92 101 - 108	92 101 - 108	Württemberg T 4	
92 201...320	92 201...320	Baden X b	Not all numbers were utilised
92 401 - 413	92 401 - 413	Oldenburg T 13.1, Prussian T 13.1	
92 501 - 505		Prussian T 13	Hagans type
92 506 - 986	92 501 - 913, 1001–1072	Prussian T 13, Oldenburg T 13	
92 2001 - 2040	92 2001 - 2049	Palatine R 4/4, Bavarian R 4/4	
93 001 - 405	93 001 - 406	Prussian T 14	
93 406 - 739	93 501 - 1261	Prussian T 14.1, Württemberg T 14	
94 001 - 004	94 001 - 004	Palatine T 5	
94 101 - 130	94 101 - 130	Württemberg Tn	
94 201 - 462	94 201 - 467*	Prussian T 16	* 94 465 - 467 wrongly classed T 16.1, reclassified in 1934 to 94 1378 - 1380
94 501 - 1390	94 501 - 1377*, 1501–1740	Prussian T 16.1	* 94 501 wrongly classed T 16
94 1901 - 1908	94 1901 - 1908	Saxon XI HT	Axle load 15 t
94 2001 - 2087	94 2001 - 2139	Saxon XI HT	Axle load 16 t
94 7001 - 7022		Prussian T 15	Hagans version
	95 001 - 045	Prussian T 20	
96 001 - 025	96 001 - 025	Bavarian Gt 2x4/4	

== Cog locomotives ==
Original operating numbers 1923 - 2nd renumbering plan	Final operating numbers 1925 renumbering plan	State railway class	Remarks
97 001 - 034	97 001 - 030	Prussian T 26	
97 101 - 104	97 101 - 104	Bavarian PtzL 3/4	
97 201 - 204, 251 - 253	97 201 - 204, 251 - 253	Baden IX b	
97 301 - 309	97 301 - 307	Württemberg Fz	
97 401	97 401	Prussian T 28	
	97 501 - 504	Württemberg Hz	

== Branch line locomotives ==
Original operating numbers 1923 - 2nd renumbering plan	Final operating numbers 1925 renumbering plan	State railway class	Remarks
98 001 - 015	98 001 - 015	Saxon I TV	
98 101 - 138	98 101 - 137	Oldenburg T 2	
98 201 - 215	98 201 - 215	Oldenburg T 3	
98 301 - 306		Bavarian PtL 2/2 (Krauss)	Krauss type, inside drive
98 311 - 339	98 301 - 309	Bavarian PtL 2/2 (Krauss)	Krauss type, jackshaft
98 340 - 352	98 310 - 322	Bavarian PtL 2/2 (Krauss)	Krauss type, standard drive
98 361 - 383		Bavarian PtL 2/2 (Maffei)	Maffei version
98 401 - 403	98 401 - 403	Palatine T 4.II	
98 411 - 423, 431 - 556	98 411 - 423, 431 - 556	Bavarian D XI	
98 561 - 568	98 561 - 568	Bavarian PtL 3/4	
98 571 - 577	98 651 - 657	Palatine T 4.I	
98 581 - 588	98 681 - 688	Palatine D VIII	
98 591 - 600	98 661 - 669	Bavarian D VIII	Built 1888-1893
98 601 - 609	98 671 - 679	Bavarian D VIII	Built 1898-1903
98 701 - 731	98 701 - 731	Bavarian BB II	
98 801 - 853	98 801 - 900	Bavarian GtL 4/4	98 901-917 were follow-on orders by the DRG
98 7001		Saxon VII TSV	
98 7011 - 7016	98 7011	Saxon VII TS	
98 7021		Saxon VII T	ex Berlin-Dresden line, Hanomag version, built 1884
98 7031	98 7031	Saxon VII T	Hartmann version, built 1885
98 7041	98 7041	Saxon VII T	Karlsruhe version, built 1873
98 7051 - 7088	98 7051 - 7079	Saxon VII T	Hartmann version, built 1882 - 1894
98 7091 - 7093	98 7091	Saxon VII T	Schichau version, Years of manufacture 1873/74
98 7101, 7111 - 7120	98 7111 - 7113	Saxon VII	
98 7201 - 7204, 7211 - 7239	98 7211, 7212, 7221 - 7227	Saxon IIIb T	
98 7301, 7302, 7311-7316	98 7311, 7312	Saxon II	
98 7401 - 7406	98 7401 - 7405	Oldenburg T 1.2	
98 7501 - 7545	98 7501 - 7526	Bavarian D VI	
98 7601 - 7614, 7621 - 7681	98 7601 - 7614, 7621 - 7681	Bavarian D VII	
98 7691, 7692	98 7691, 7692	Bavarian PtL 3/3	
98 7701 - 7709	98 7701 - 7709	Bavarian D X	

== Narrow gauge locomotives ==
=== 1000 mm Gauge ===
Original operating numbers 1923 - 2nd renumbering plan	Final operating numbers 1925 renumbering plan	State railway class	Remarks
99 001 - 005	99 001 - 005	Palatine L 2	
99 011	99 011	Palatine Pts 2/2	
99 021 - 023	99 021 - 023	Oldenburg B	
99 031, 032, 041 - 045, 051, 052, 061 - 063	99 031, 032, 041 - 045, 051, 052, 061 - 063	Prussian T 33	
99 071 - 075	99 071 - 075	Bavarian LE	
99 081 - 092	99 081 - 092	Palatine L 1	
99 093	99 093	Palatine Pts 3/3 N	
99 101 - 103	99 101 - 103	Palatine Pts 3/3 H	
99 121	99 121	Württemberg Ts 3	
99 131 - 133	99 131 - 133	Bavarian Pts 3/4	
99 141		Prussian T 35	
99 151	99 151	Bavarian Gts 4/4	
99 161 - 163	99 161 - 163	Saxon I M	
99 171 - 173	99 171 - 173	Württemberg Ts 4	
	99 181 - 183	Prussian T 40	
		(Württemberg Ts 5)	99 191 - 194 were follow-on orders by the DRG
99 201	99 201	Bavarian Gts 2x3/3	
99 7101, 7102	99 7102	Prussian T 31	

=== 900 mm Gauge ===
Original operating numbers 1923 - 2nd renumbering plan	Final operating numbers 1925 renumbering plan	State railway class	Remarks
99 301, 302		Mecklenburg T 7	Built 1891 - 1898
99 303 - 305	99 301 - 303	Mecklenburg T 7	Built 1910 - 1914
99 311 - 313	99 311 - 313	(Mecklenburg T 42)	

=== 785 mm Gauge ===
Original operating numbers 1923 - 2nd renumbering plan	Final operating numbers 1925 renumbering plan	State railway class	Remarks
99 401 - 408	99 401 - 408	Prussian T 37	
99 411 - 421	99 411 - 421	Prussian T 38	
99 431 - 435	99 431 - 435	Prussian T 39	99 441 - 446 were follow-on orders by the DRG
99 7401 - 7404		Prussian T 31	
99 7411 - 7413		Prussian T 31	

=== 750 mm Gauge ===
Original operating numbers 1923 - 2nd renumbering plan	Final operating numbers 1925 renumbering plan	State railway class	Remarks
99 501 - 504	99 501 - 504	Württemberg Tss 3	
99 511 - 546, 551 - 558, 561 - 579, 581 - 608	99 511 - 546, 551 - 558, 561 - 579, 581 - 608	Saxon IV K	
99 611 - 619	99 611 - 619	Saxon V K	
99 631 - 623	99 621, 622	Württemberg Tss 4	
99 631 - 639	99 631 - 639	Württemberg Tssd	
99 641 - 655, 99 671 - 717	99 641 - 655, 99 671 - 717	Saxon VI K	
99 7501 - 7537	99 7501 - 7527	Saxon I K	
99 7541 - 7546	99 7541 - 7546	Saxon III K	
99 7551		Saxon II K	Double locomotive, comprising two I Ks

== Literature ==
- Helmut Griebl, Fr. Schadow: Verzeichnis der deutschen Lokomotiven 1923 - 1965; Transpress VEB Verlag für Verkehrswesen Berlin, Verlag Josef Otto Slezak Wien 1967
- Valtin, Wolfgang: Verzeichnis aller Lokomotiven und Triebwagen - Band 2; Transpress Verlagsgesellschaft mbH Berlin 1992; ISBN 3-344-70740-X
- Herbert Rauter, Dr. Günter Scheingraber, Manfred Weisbrod: Preußen-Report, Bände 3 - 8; Herrmann Merker Verlag Fürstenfeldbruck 1991 - 1994

== See also ==
- History of rail transport in Germany
- Deutsche Reichsbahn
- Deutsche Reichsbahn-Gesellschaft
- UIC classification
