= Class 71 =

Class 71 may refer to:

- GMB Class 71, a Norwegian passenger train.
- British Rail Class 71
- DRG Class 71, a class of German tank locomotives with a 2-4-2T wheel arrangement operated by the Deutsche Reichsbahn comprising the:
  - DRG Class 71.0: Standard locomotive Einheitslokomotive
  - Class 71.0: Prussian T 5.1
  - Class 71.2: Bavarian Pt 2/4 H
  - Class 71.3: Saxon IV T
  - Class 71.4: Oldenburg T 5.1
  - Class 71.5: BBÖ DT 1
  - Class 71.6: PH E
  - Class 71.70: PKP Class OKe1
