= Class 93 =

Class 93 may refer to:

- British Rail Class 93 (InterCity 250), an unbuilt locomotive type, planned by British Rail.
- British Rail Class 93 (Stadler), an upcoming tri-mode electric-diesel-battery locomotive, built by Stadler Rail.
- DRG or DR Class 93, a German 2-8-2 tank locomotive operated by the Deutsche Reichsbahn:
  - Class 93.0-4: Prussian T 14, PKP Class Tkt 1, SNCB Class 97
  - Class 93.5-12: Prussian T 14.1, Württemberg T 14, PKP-Class Tkt 2
  - Class 93.13-14: BBÖ Class 378
  - Class 93.15: ČSD Class 423.0
  - Class 93.1601 + 1602: MFWE Nos. 33 and 34
  - Class 93.1611 + 1612: PE Nos. 7 and 22
  - Class 93.64: diverse locomotives taken over in 1949 by the Deutsche Reichsbahn
  - Class 93.65: locomotive taken over in 1949 by the Deutsche Reichsbahn BStB No. 59
  - Class 93.66: diverse locomotives taken over in 1949 by the Deutsche Reichsbahn
  - Class 93.67: locomotives taken over in 1949 by the Deutsche Reichsbahn HBE Nos. 10 to 12
- KTM Class 93, a Malaysian electric multiple unit (EMU) train
