= Prussian G 4.3 =

Class of 63 German 0-6-0 locomotives

Prussian G 4.3 DR class 53.3 PKP Th4
Type and origin
- Builder: Union Gießerei
- Build date: 1903–1907
- Total produced: 63
Specifications
- Gauge: 1,435 mm (4 ft 8 1/2 in)
- Driver dia.: 1,350 mm (4 ft 5 1/8 in)
- Length
  - Over beams: 15,362 mm (50 ft 4 3/4 in)
- Axle load: 16.0 t (15.7 long tons; 17.6 short tons)
- Adhesive weight: 46.7 t (46.0 long tons; 51.5 short tons)
- Service weight: 46.7 t (46.0 long tons; 51.5 short tons)
- Tender type: pr 3 T 10.5 or 3 T 12
- Fuel capacity: 4 or 7 t (3.9 or 6.9 long tons; 4.4 or 7.7 short tons)
- Water cap.: 10.5 or 12.0 m^{3} (10,500 or 12,000 L; 2,300 or 2,600 imp gal; 2,800 or 3,200 US gal)
- Boiler
- No. of heating tubes: 217
- Heating tube length: 3,900 mm (153 1/2 in)
- Boiler pressure: 12.0 bar (12.2 kgf/cm^{2}; 1.20 MPa; 174 lbf/in^{2})
- Heating surface
  - Firebox: 1.73 m^{2} (18.6 sq ft)
  - Radiative: 8.7 m^{2} (94 sq ft)
  - Tubes: 109.0 m^{2} (1,173 sq ft)
  - Evaporative: 117.71 m^{2} (1,267.0 sq ft)
- Cylinders: Two, outside
- High-pressure cylinder: 460 mm (18 1/8 in)
- Low-pressure cylinder: 680 mm (26 3/4 in)
- Piston stroke: 630 mm (24 13/16 in)
- Valve gear: Heusinger (Walschaerts), outside
Performance figures
- Maximum speed: 60 km/h (37 mph)
Career
- Numbers: KPEV 3901–4000; DR 53 301 – 53 328; DR 53 7751 – 53 7753
- Retired: by 1928

The Prussian G 4.3 was a class of 0-6-0 goods locomotive of the Prussian State Railways; they were manufactured between 1903 and 1907 by Union Giesserei in Königsberg. The type was developed with the aim of improving the running characteristics of 6-coupled locomotives. They proved a more capable design than the normal-type (G 4.2), and so had a higher maximum speed of 60 km/h (37 mph). However, they were quickly outclassed by increasing weight of freight trains.

They were used for passenger and ordinary freight services, as well as express freight trains, mainly in the eastern divisions. Only 63 locomotives were manufactured, of which 39 were included in the 1923 DRG renumbering plan, as 53 296 and 297, and 53 301 to 53 337. In the final 1925 plan, the Reichsbahn renumbered the remaining 28 locomotives as 53 301 to 53 328. They were all retired by 1928.

After World War I, ten locomotives were transferred to Poland, and five to the Free City of Danzig. The PKP operated all 15 as class Th4. Nine locomotives were transferred to Belgium; they were not renumbered, and all were retired in 1923.

During World War II, three of the Danzig locomotives were taken back into the Reichsbahn fleet as 53 7751 to 53 7753. They passed to Deutsche Bundesbahn at the end of the war; one was sold to a sugar factory in 1946, but all were retired in 1951.

The locomotives were coupled to type pr 3 T 10.5 or pr 3 T 12 tenders.
