= Prussian G 9 =

Prussian G 9 DRG Class 55.23–24 ČSD class 427.05 PKP Tp5 SNCB Type 79
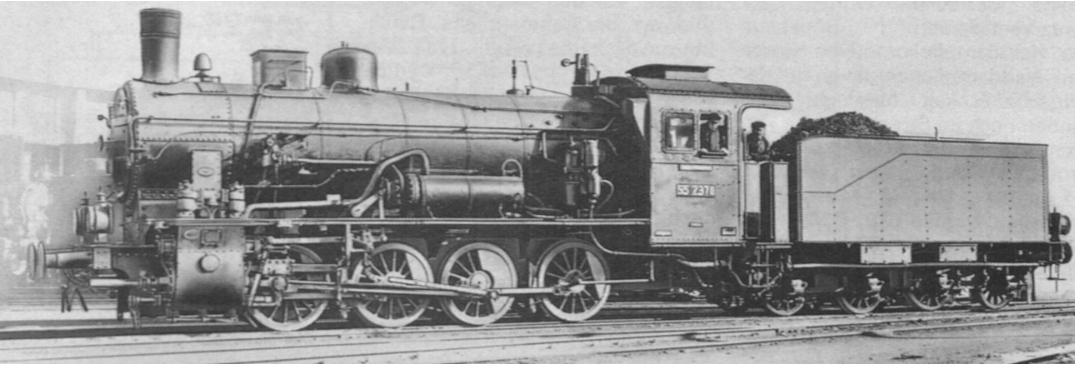
Type and origin
- Builder: Schichau-Werke; Hanomag; Henschel & Sohn; Borsig
- Build date: 1908–1911
- Total produced: 200
Specifications
- Configuration
  - Whyte: 0-8-0
- Gauge: 1,435 mm (4 ft 8 1/2 in)
- Driver dia.: 1,250 mm (4 ft 1 1/4 in)
- Length
  - Over beams: 16,758 mm (54 ft 11 3/4 in)
- Axle load: 15.2 t (15.0 long tons; 16.8 short tons)
- Adhesive weight: 59.0 t (58.1 long tons; 65.0 short tons)
- Service weight: 59.0 t (58.1 long tons; 65.0 short tons)
- Water cap.: 12.0 m^{3} (2,600 imp gal; 3,200 US gal)
- Boiler pressure: 12 kgf/cm^{2} (1,180 kPa; 171 lbf/in^{2})
- Heating surface
  - Firebox: 3.05 m^{2} (32.8 sq ft)
  - Evaporative: 197.58 m^{2} (2,126.7 sq ft)
- Cylinders: 2
- Cylinder size: 550 mm (21 5/8 in)
- Piston stroke: 630 mm (24 13/16 in)
Performance figures
- Maximum speed: 45 km/h (28 mph)
- Indicated power: 925 PS (680 kW; 912 hp)
Career
- Numbers: DRG: 55 2301 – 55 2433
- Retired: by 1961

The Prussian G 9 was the last saturated (i.e non-superheated) locomotive class developed for the Prussian state railways. A total of 200 were put into service between 1908 and 1911, first by Schichau, and later by other locomotive manufacturers. Since problems arose with the G 8, the superheated steam technology was not really trusted. The chassis was taken from the G 7, whereas the larger boiler was a new design. The G 9 remained inferior to the G 8 in terms of performance. At first a number of locomotives were referred to as G 7, but they were later reclassified G 9. They mainly operated in ore traffic between the Ruhr area and the North Sea.

After World War I, 58 locomotives were ceded to Belgium (type 79), eight to Poland for the Polish State Railways (PKP), who classified them as Tp5, and one locomotive to the Saarland.

133 locomotives passed to Deutsche Reichsbahn and were given the fleet numbers 55 2301 to 55 2433. Thirty-six of them were fitted with superheaters in the 1920s, which led to an increase in performance and speed. The locomotives that survived World War II were either retired (in the western zones by 1949, in East Germany as the last in 1961, 55 2361) or sold to private railways.

After 1945, the ČSD had two locomotives. They were designated as series 427.05. They originally came from Poland, part of PKP's Tp5 series. In 1947 they were returned to the PKP.

The locomotives were equipped with a Prussian 3-axle tender, type pr 3 T 12, to diagram sheet III-5b.
