= Prussian G 7.2 =

Prussian G 7.2 Mecklenburg G 7.2 DR Class 55.7–14, 55.57 ČSD Class 413.3 PKP Tp2 SNCB Type 72
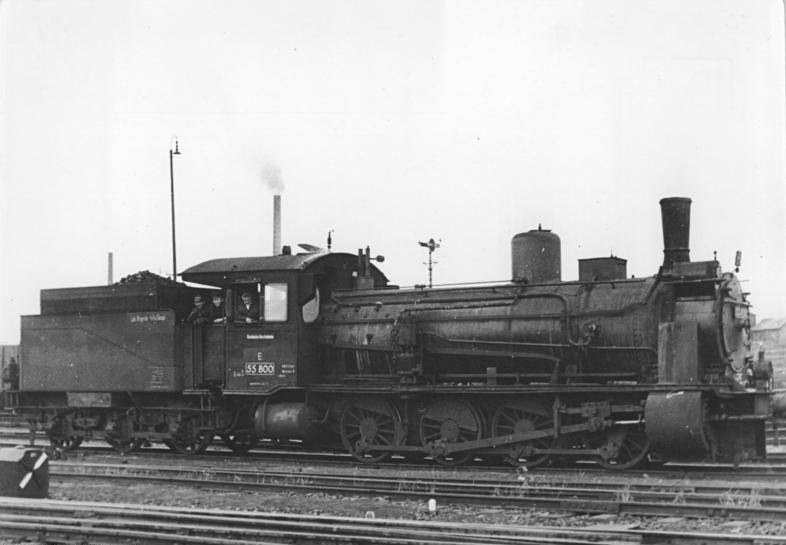
- DB 55 800 in August 1952
Type and origin
- Builder: Vulcan; Hanomag; Schichau-Werke; Linke-Hofmann; Berliner Maschinenbau; Henschel & Sohn; Hohenzollern; Union Gießerei; Orenstein & Koppel; Grafenstaden
- Build date: Prussia: 1895–1911; Mecklenburg: 1914–1916
- Total produced: Prussia: 1642; Mecklenburg: 11
Specifications
- Configuration
  - Whyte: 0-8-0
  - German: Prussia: G 44.12; Mecklenburg: G 44.14
- Gauge: 1,435 mm (4 ft 8 1/2 in)
- Driver dia.: 1,250 mm (4 ft 1 1/4 in)
- Wheelbase
  - Overall: 4,500 mm (14 ft 9 1/4 in)
  - incl. tender: 11,775 mm (38 ft 7 1/2 in)
- Length
  - Over beams: 16,620 mm (54 ft 6 1/4 in)
- Height: 4,200 mm (13 ft 9 3/8 in)
- Axle load: Prussia: 13.3–13.6 t (13.1–13.4 long tons; 14.7–15.0 short tons); Mecklenburg: 14.0 t (13.8 long tons; 15.4 short tons)
- Adhesive weight: Prussia: 53.3–54.5 t (52.5–53.6 long tons; 58.8–60.1 short tons); Mecklenburg: 55.8 t (54.9 long tons; 61.5 short tons)
- Empty weight: Prussia: 47.9–48.5 t (47.1–47.7 long tons; 52.8–53.5 short tons); Mecklenburg: 51.0 t (50.2 long tons; 56.2 short tons)
- Service weight: Prussia: 53.3–54.5 t (52.5–53.6 long tons; 58.8–60.1 short tons); Mecklenburg: 55.8 t (54.9 long tons; 61.5 short tons)
- Tender type: Prussia: pr 3 T 12; Mecklenburg: meck 3 T 12
- Fuel capacity: 5 t (11,000 lb) of coal
- Water cap.: 12 m^{3} (2,600 imp gal; 3,200 US gal)
- Boiler
- No. of heating tubes: Prussia: 218–222; Mecklenburg: 216
- Heating tube length: 4,100 mm (13 ft 5 1/2 in)
- Boiler pressure: 12 kg/cm^{2} (1,180 kPa; 171 lbf/in^{2})
- Heating surface
  - Firebox: 2.29 m^{2} (24.6 sq ft)
  - Radiative: 10.33 m^{2} (111.2 sq ft)
  - Tubes: Prussia: 126.29–128.6 m^{2} (1,359.4–1,384.2 sq ft); Mecklenburg: 125.2 m^{2} (1,348 sq ft)
  - Evaporative: Prussia: 136.61–138.6 m^{2} (1,470.5–1,491.9 sq ft); Mecklenburg: 135.52 m^{2} (1,458.7 sq ft)
- Cylinders: 2
- High-pressure cylinder: 530 mm (20 7/8 in)
- Low-pressure cylinder: 750 mm (29 1/2 in)
- Piston stroke: 630 mm (24 13/16 in)
- Valve gear: Allan
Performance figures
- Maximum speed: 45 km/h (28 mph)
Career
- Numbers: DRG 55 702 – 55 1412; MFFE 466–476 → DRG 55 5701 – 55 5705
- Retired: 1922–1961

The Prussian G 7.2 was a class of 0-8-0 tender compound locomotives of the Prussian state railways. In the 1925 renumbering plan of Deutsche Reichsbahn, the former Prussian locomotives produced from 1895 to 1911 were given the class designation 55.7–13; while the locomotives of former Mecklenburgische Friedrich-Franz-Eisenbahn (MFFE) locomotives were classified as 55.57.

== History ==
=== Prussian State Railways ===
In 1895 the Prussian Ministry for Public Works decided that compound locomotives could be built. Thus, the procurement of a compound version of G 7.1 according to diagram (Musterblatt) III 3i began. By 1911, 1642 locomotives had been put into service with the Prussian State Railways. They were supplied by all Prussian locomotive manufacturers. The design of the G 7.2 largely followed that of the G 7.1. Owing to the weight of the low-pressure cylinder, the boiler barrel was shortened, and the smokebox extended.

The locomotives had to move a 1,400-tonne (1,380-long-ton; 1,540-short-ton) train on the level at 40 km/h (25 mph), and a 690-tonne (680-long-ton; 760-short-ton) train on a 5‰ (0.5%, 1 in 200) at 30 km/h (19 mph). Owing to the fuel consumption figures, the compound locomotives were cheaper to run than the two-cylinder simple locomotives, especially in mainline service; they were less suitable for shunting. With the exception of the Berlin Division (Direktion Berlin), the design was procured for all Prussian railway divisions. The locomotives were assigned the number groups 4601 to 4800 and 5801 to 6000.

An experiment carried out in 1903 with a Lentz-type corrugated tube boiler fitted to Hannover 1302 was unsuccessful.

In 1919, many locomotives had to be surrendered as reparations to the railways in Poland (PKP Tp2), Lithuania (LG P 7.2), Belgium (Type 72) and France. Thirty-one locomotives were transferred to the Imperial Railways in Alsace-Lorraine (Reichseisenbahnen in Elsaß-Lothringen) and were taken over by the Chemin de fer d’Alsace-Lorraine. They were given the fleet numbers 4321 to 4351. They were used over the entire route network.

The locomotives delivered to France were spread over four networks:

- the Administration des chemins de fer d’Alsace et de Lorraine (AL) received 20 locomotives (as G7.2 4321–4340); a further 11 locos (G7.2 4341–4351) came to the AL as war booty;
- the Compagnie des Chemins de fer de l’Est (Est) received a solitary G7.2 (fleet number 4704), which was withdrawn in 1926;
- the Compagnie des chemins de fer du Nord (Nord) received 98 locos (4.1001–4.1098), all bar one from the Prussian State Railways. The exception was 4.1076 which came from the MFFE;
- the Compagnie du chemin de fer de Paris à Orléans (P.O.) received six locos (1306–1311, renumbered 1387–1392 in 1924).

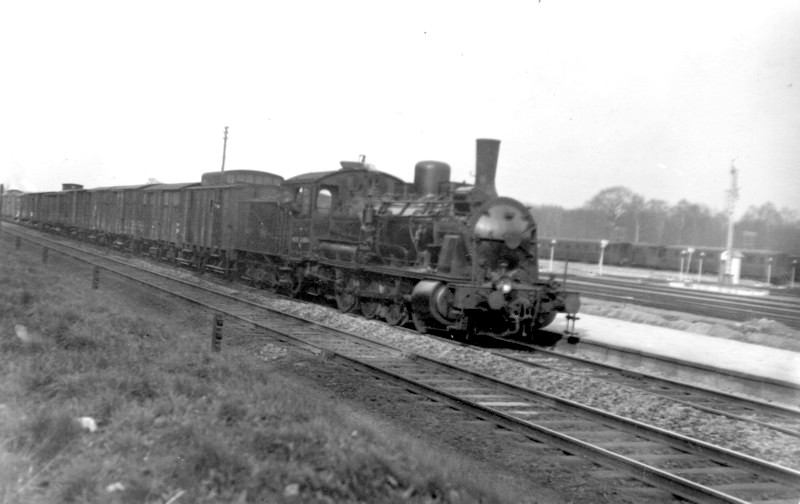
Nord 4.1084 at the head of a goods train (pre-1938)

Twenty-three of the Alsace-Lorraine locomotives passed to the SNCF in 1938 and were assigned to the 1-040.B.301 to 1-040.B.351 number series. The last locomotive was withdrawn in 1951. Most of the Nord locomotives also passed to the SNCF and were renumbered 2-040.B.1 to 2-040.B.97.

In 1925, the Deutsche Reichsbahn planned the renumbering of 691 locomotives as 55 702 to 55 1392. The number 55 701 was assigned in error to a G 7.3. Most locomotives were retired by the late 1930s. In 1935, the Reichsbahn inherited 18 former Prussian locomotives from the Railways of the Saarland; they were renumbered 55 1393 to 55 1410; the last three had been acquired from Alasace-Lorraine for border services only a few month earlier. After the Invasion of Poland in 1939, the locomotives that had been surrendered to Poland and Lithuania were renumbered in the range 55 701 to 55 894 and 55 1412 by the Reichsbahn. After World War II, the locomotives came in to stock of the West German Deutsche Bundesbahn and the East German Deutsche Reichsbahn.

=== Mecklenburg Friedrich-Franz Railway ===
The Grand Duchy of Mecklenburg Friedrich-Franz Railway ordered its first G 7.2 from Linke-Hofmann in 1914, three years after the last of the type had been delivered to the Prussian state railways. As the MFFE workshops were not set up for superheated steam locomotives, a saturated design was used. The locomotives were delivered until 1916, and were given the fleet numbers 466 to 476. Compared to the Prussian version, the locomotives had a Knorr feedwater heater on the second ring of the boiler behind the steam dome. This appliance increased the overall mass of the locomotive. In 1919 five locomotives had to be surrendered to Belgium (État Belge 7295–7299) and one to France (CF du Nord 4.1076). The locomotives that passed to the Deutsche Reichsbahn were renumbered as 55 5701 to 55 5705 in 1925, and were retired by 1930.

== Service elsewhere ==
The Deutsche Bundesbahn sold some of the locomotives to non-federal railways (Mindener Kreisbahnen, Kahlgrund-Eisenbahn). Some locomotives remained in eastern European countries and were later mostly sold to the Polish State Railways.

== Construction features ==
The locomotives has a rivetted and screwed plate metal frame. The three-ring long-boiler was rivetted. The sandbox sat on the first ring, the steam dome on the second. The Ramsbottom safety valve was on the firebox wrapper in front of the cab. The boiler was fed by two Strube injectors.

The two-cylinder saturated compound drive was external, and was connected to the third coupled axle. The right-hand high-pressure and left-hand low-pressure cylinders were inclined at 1 in 20. A Mallet/von Borries-type starting valve was fitted; for locomotives built from 1897 a Dultz-type was used instead. The Allan valve gear was between the frames.

The frame was supported at four points. the leaf spring packages were below the axle bearings. The spring assemblies of the first and second as well as the third and fourth axles were connected by compensating levers.

The steam brake acted on the second and fourth wheelsets from above. The sanding gear applied sand in front of the second wheelset. The locomotives were equipped with a type 3 T 12 tender holding 5 or 7 tonnes (11,000 or 15,000 lb) of coal.

The locomotives built in the first two years had cabs with short roofs, from 1897 they were extended over the tender fallplate.
