= Prussian T 13 =

Class of German 0-8-0T tank locomotives

The Prussian T 13 was a series of tank locomotives built in large numbers for the various German state railways, notably the Prussian state railways, and the Deutsche Reichsbahn during the early part of the 20th century.

== T 13 ==
Prussian T 13 Oldenburg T 13 Alsace-Lorraine T 13 DRG Class 92.5–10 ÖBB 792 État-Belge Type 99
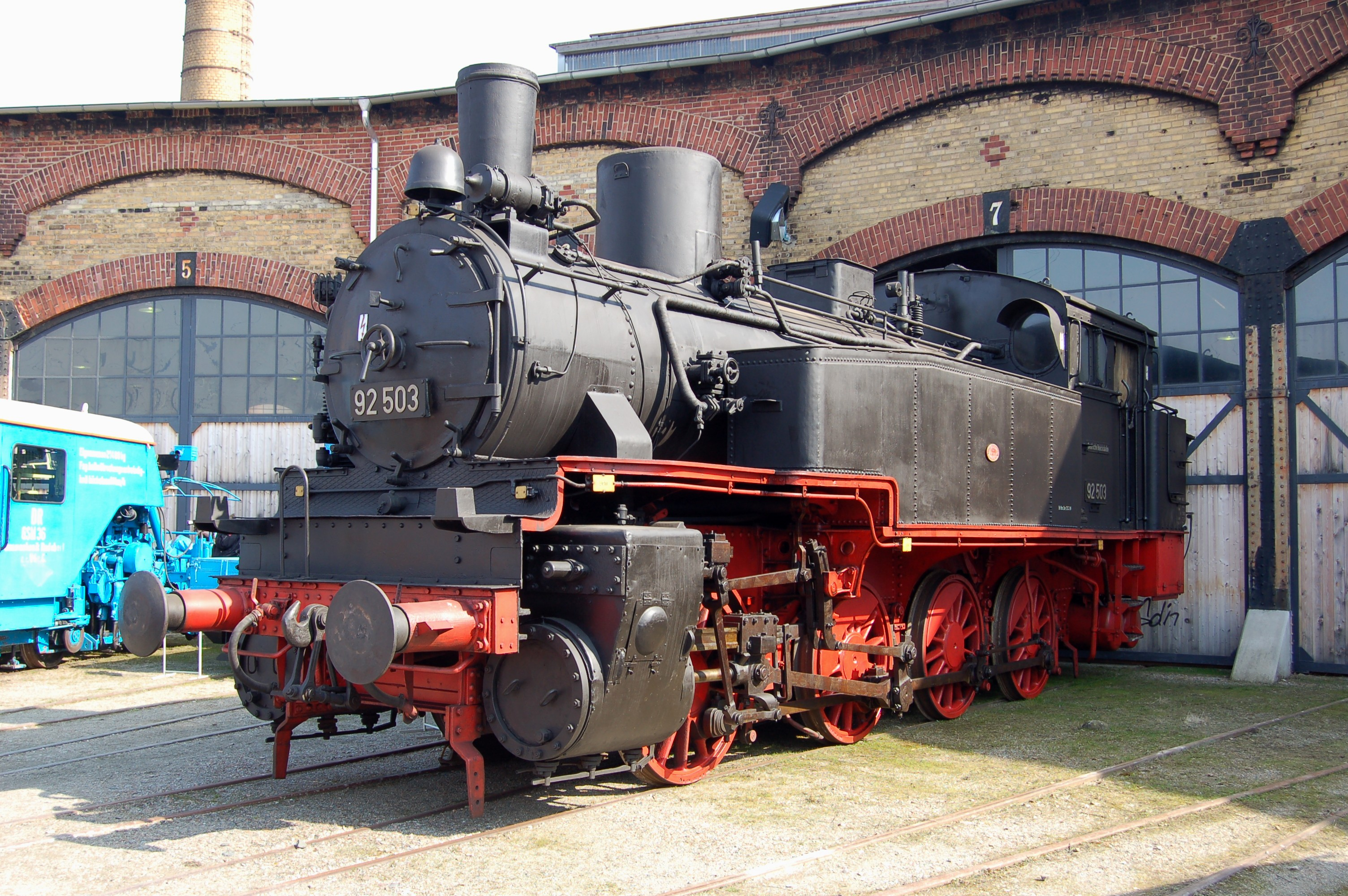
Type and origin
- Builder: Union Gießerei Königsberg and others
- Build date: 1910–1922
- Total produced: 656
Specifications
- Configuration
  - Whyte: 0-8-0T
  - German: Gt 44.15; Gt 44.16 (1921/2)
- Gauge: 1,435 mm (4 ft 8 1/2 in)
- Driver dia.: 1,250 mm (4 ft 1 1/4 in)
- Length
  - Over beams: 11,100 mm (36 ft 5 in)
- Axle load: 15.0 tonnes (14.8 long tons; 16.5 short tons)
- Adhesive weight: 59.9 tonnes (59.0 long tons; 66.0 short tons)
- Service weight: 59.9 tonnes (59.0 long tons; 66.0 short tons)
- Boiler pressure: 12 bar (1.20 MPa; 174 psi)
- Heating surface
  - Firebox: 1.68 m^{2} (18.1 sq ft)
  - Evaporative: 112.44 m^{2} (1,210.3 sq ft)
- Cylinder size: 500 mm (19 11/16 in)
- Piston stroke: 600 mm (23 5/8 in)
Performance figures
- Maximum speed: 45 km/h (28 mph)
- Indicated power: 370 kW (503 PS; 496 hp)
Career
- Numbers: DRG 92 501–1072
- Retired: 1968

The physically identical T 13 locomotives of the Prussian state railways, the Imperial Railways in Alsace-Lorraine and the Grand Duchy of Oldenburg State Railways were goods train, tank locomotives with an 0-8-0T wheel arrangement. They were primarily employing on shunting duties. Between 1910 and 1916 a total of 512 were built by various manufacturers for the Prussian state railways. As a result of heavy losses after the First World War, another 72 were ordered by the Deutsche Reichsbahn and 12 by the Saar Railways which were delivered in 1921 and 1922. The Imperial Railways in Alsace-Lorraine also had 60 T 13s and Oldenburg had ten of this class.

They were incorporated in 1925 into the DRG renumbering plan for steam locomotives as DRG Class 92.5–10 and given operating numbers 92 501–913 and 92 1001–1072. Of these, numbers 92 585–588, 92 606, 92 607, 92 910–913 were locomotives that originated in the Grand Duchy of Oldenburg State Railways and 92 732–738 from the Imperial Railways in Alsace-Lorraine.

In 1935, locomotives 92 919–950 were transferred from the Saar Railways to the Deutsche Reichsbahn. In 1943 they were joined by a further five locomotives from the Zschipkau-Finsterwald Railway Company with numbers 92 991–995. During the Second World War, numbers 92 951–990 and 996 from Poland and 92 1101–1112 from Czechoslovakia were added. The Deutsche Reichsbahn (East Germany) took over in 1950 locomotives 92 6401 and 92 6501–6504 from private railways. Numbers 92 6502–6504 were T 13s that had been procured directly by the Brandenburg Städtebahn. Also in this block of numbers were 92 914 to 92 918, which were the former Bremen Harbour Railway (Hafenbahn Bremen, Hf Brm) 20 to 24 that had been acquired when the Hf Brm had been nationalised in 1930; they were not Prussian T 13s, but an industrial 0-8-0T design by Arnold Jung Lokomotivfabrik.

The Deutsche Bundesbahn retired the last engine in 1965 at Kassel Locomotive Depot (Bahnbetriebswerk or Bw); the Reichsbahn followed suit in 1968.

Four representatives of the D-h2t Class 92.10 remained in Austria after the Second World War. These were numbers 92 1052, 1055, 1063 and 1068. The ÖBB retained their serial numbers but grouped them into ÖBB Class 792. All the engines in this class had been retired by 1962.

== T 13.1 ==
Prussian T 13.1 Oldenburg T 13.1 DRG Class 92.4
Type and origin
- Builder: Hanomag, Krauss
- Build date: 1921ff.
- Total produced: 18
Specifications
- Configuration
  - Whyte: 0-8-0T
  - German: Gt 44.16
- Gauge: 1,435 mm (4 ft 8 1/2 in)
- Driver dia.: 1,250 mm (4 ft 1 1/4 in)
- Length
  - Over beams: 11,100 mm (36 ft 5 in)
- Axle load: 16.5 tonnes (16.2 long tons; 18.2 short tons)
- Adhesive weight: 65.4 tonnes (64.4 long tons; 72.1 short tons)
- Service weight: 65.4 tonnes (64.4 long tons; 72.1 short tons)
- Boiler pressure: 12 bar (1.20 MPa; 174 psi)
- Heating surface
  - Firebox: 1.73 m^{2} (18.6 sq ft)
  - Evaporative: 92.51 m^{2} (995.8 sq ft)
- Superheater
  - Heating area: 49.30 m^{2} (530.7 sq ft)
- Cylinder size: 500 mm (19 11/16 in)
- Piston stroke: 600 mm (23 5/8 in)
Performance figures
- Maximum speed: 45 km/h (28 mph)
- Indicated power: 440 kW (598 PS; 590 hp)
Career
- Numbers: DRG 92 401–418
- Retired: 1948

In the early 1920s, the newly founded Reichsbahn ordered 13 of the proven T 13 engines in a superheated variant, the T 13.1, for the Oldenburg division (the former Grand Duchy of Oldenburg State Railways) and Altona division. They were goods train, tank locomotives with a 0-8-0T wheel arrangement and were subsequently incorporated into the Deutsche Reichsbahn's renumbering plan as DRG Class 92.4 with operating numbers 92 401 to 92 413.

The Saar Railways, too, procured five T 13.1s in 1922 from Krauss in Munich, which were however somewhat different. Amongst other things, they had a differently designed driver's cab and additional equipment on top of the boilers. They were numbered by the Reichsbahn as 92 414 to 92 418.

Other former private railway locomotives, that were numbered as 92 421, 92 431–437 and 92 441 and 442 by the Reichsbahn were not Prussian T 13.1s.

The engines remaining in the western zones of occupation after the Second World War were sold by 1948 to private railways.

== T 13 Hagans variant ==
Prussian T 13, Hagans variant DRG Class 92.5
Type and origin
- Builder: Henschel
- Build date: 1899ff.
- Total produced: 29
Specifications
- Configuration
  - Whyte: 0-8-0T
  - UIC: D t
- Gauge: 1,435 mm (4 ft 8 1/2 in)
- Driver dia.: 1,250 mm (4 ft 1 1/4 in)
- Length
  - Over beams: 10,870 mm (35 ft 8 in)
- Axle load: 15.2 tonnes (15.0 long tons; 16.8 short tons)
- Adhesive weight: 59.2 tonnes (58.3 long tons; 65.3 short tons)
- Service weight: 59.2 tonnes (58.3 long tons; 65.3 short tons)
- Boiler pressure: 12 bar (1.20 MPa; 174 psi)
- Heating surface
  - Firebox: 1.78 m^{2} (19.2 sq ft)
  - Evaporative: 91.04 m^{2} (979.9 sq ft)
- Cylinder size: 430 mm (16 15/16 in)
- Piston stroke: 630 mm (24 13/16 in)
Performance figures
- Maximum speed: 42 km/h (26 mph)
Career
- Numbers: DRG 92 501–505 (planned)
- Retired: 1923

The T 13 Hagans Variant built for the Prussian state railways was also a goods train, tank engine, with an 0-8-0T wheel arrangement, but had Hagans driving gear. The firm of Hagans in Erfurt developed this design with a split locomotive frame in order to achieve better curve running qualities. In the main frame were located the two front driving axles, whilst the rear two, were housed in a swivelling frame and driven via a specially developed arrangement of levers by the front axles. The Hagans T 13 was built as a smaller version of the Prussian T 15 by the firm of Henschel from 1899to 1902. It was delivered to the railway divisions of Erfurt, Saarbrücken, Magdeburg and Frankfurt am Main. Unfortunately its complicated construction proved to be very maintenance-intensive, which had a negative impact on its economy. As a result, the locomotives were retired as early as 1923. Two similar engines had been supplied by Henschel to the Baden state railways as the Class VIII d.

The Deutsche Reichsbahn grouped five of these locomotives into its 1923 renumbering plan as 92 501–505, but in 1925 they were no longer in service.

== T 13 Mallet variant ==
Prussian T 13 Mallet variant
Type and origin
- Builder: Humboldt, Hohenzollern
- Build date: 1903ff.
- Total produced: 5
Specifications
- Configuration
  - Whyte: 0-4-4-0T
- Gauge: 1,435 mm (4 ft 8 1/2 in)
- Length
  - Over beams: 10,700 mm (35 ft 1 1/4 in)
Career
- Numbers: Cöln 7946–7950
- Retired: 1921

Within the T 13 class of locomotives were also the five Mallet tank engines that were taken over on 1 January 1913 along with the Bergheimer Kreisbahn and Mödrath-Liblar-Brühler railway west of the Rhine. This handful of B'B n4vt engines was acquired by the Royal Prussian Railway Division of Cöln (Cologne) and they were numbered as Cöln 7946–7950. They were the only Mallet tank locomotives in Prussia. At the same time several locomotives of the Hohenzollern version were delivered to the Filderbahn and Moselbahn. The Cologne engines were retired in 1920/21.

== See also ==
- List of DRG locomotives and railbuses
- List of Prussian locomotives and railbuses
- List of preserved steam locomotives in Germany
