= Bavarian B VI =

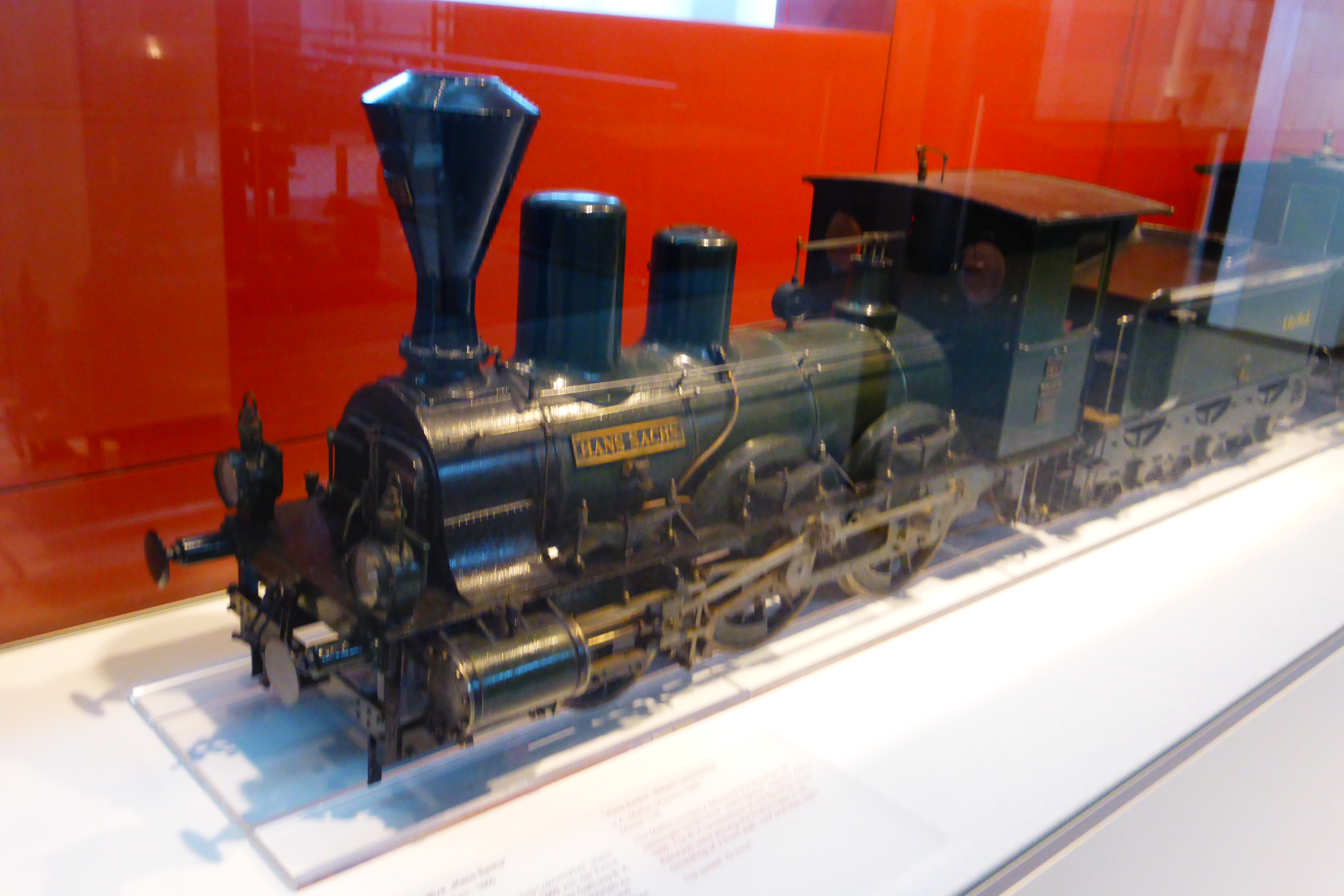
- Model of the B VI, No. 418 Hans Sachs
Type and origin
- Builder: Maffei
- Build date: 1863–1871
- Total produced: 107 (57 in Series 1, 50 in Series 2)
Specifications
- Configuration
  - Whyte: 2-4-0
- Gauge: 1,435 mm (4 ft 8 1/2 in)
- Leading dia.: 1,118–1,150 mm (3 ft 8 in – 3 ft 9 1/4 in)
- Driver dia.: 1,600–1,620 mm (5 ft 3 in – 5 ft 3 3/4 in)
- Length
  - Over beams: 13,310–13,800 mm (43 ft 8 in – 45 ft 3 1/4 in)
- Axle load: 10.7–12.1 t (10.5–11.9 long tons; 11.8–13.3 short tons)
- Adhesive weight: 21.5–24.2 t (21.2–23.8 long tons; 23.7–26.7 short tons)
- Service weight: 30.0–33.5 t (29.5–33.0 long tons; 33.1–36.9 short tons)
- Water cap.: 9.0 or 9.6 m^{3} (2,000 or 2,100 imp gal; 2,400 or 2,500 US gal)
- Boiler pressure: 8 or 10 kgf/cm^{2} (785 or 981 kPa; 114 or 142 lbf/in^{2})
- Heating surface
  - Firebox: 1.24 m^{2} (13.3 sq ft)
  - Evaporative: 90.20–91.40 m^{2} (970.9–983.8 sq ft)
- Cylinders: 2
- Cylinder size: 406 mm (16 in)
- Piston stroke: 610 mm (24 in)
Performance figures
- Maximum speed: 75 km/h
Career
- Numbers: 266 MOOSBURG to 496 BÜRGER (not consecutive); DRG 34 7461 - 34 7462 (provisional no. scheme)
- Retired: 1896–1923

The Bavarian B VI steam engines were 2-4-0 locomotives with the Royal Bavarian State Railways (Königlich Bayerische Staatsbahn).

This class was a development of the B V; its dimensions, heating area and grate area being almost the same, only the driving wheel diameter being larger. It was built in two series.

Series 1 delivered 57 locomotives in four batches which had a boiler overpressure of 8 bar. The first two batches, delivered in 1863 and 1864, had a large goblet-shaped smokestack and open driver's platform with a windshield. Batches 3 and 4, delivered from 1865 to 1867 added a roof over the driver's platform; the smokestacks were now cylindrical or pear-shaped and an injector and pump for the feedwater.

On the second series of five batches, the boiler overpressure was raised to 10 bar. The first two batches (delivered 1867–1869), unusually, were peat-fired and hauled a covered peat tender. The first batch had side windows on the driver's cab and cylindrical or funnel-shaped chimneys. The second batch (see illustration of ORLANDO DI LASSO) lost the side windows again. Batches three and four, delivered in 1870, were a mix of peat-fired engines with funnel smokestacks and coal-fired engines with conical chimneys. The final batch of 6 engines, delivered in 1871, were peat-fired with funnel smokestacks and no side windows and rounded corners to the cabs.

The last two examples remaining in service (422 WREDE and 432 MARKTL) were transferred to the ownership of the Reichsbahn in 1920 and were listed in the DRG's 1923 provisional renumbering plan as nos. 34 7461 and 34 7462. However the renumbering was never carried out because they had retired by 1923.

They were coupled to Bavarian 3 T 9 and 3 T 9.6 tenders.

== See also ==
- Royal Bavarian State Railways
- List of Bavarian locomotives and railbuses
