= Bavarian D I =

Bavarian tank locomotive

Type and origin
- Builder: Maffei
- Build date: 1871-75
- Total produced: 15
Specifications
- Configuration
  - Whyte: 0-4-0
- Gauge: 1,435 mm (4 ft 8 1/2 in) standard gauge
- Driver dia.: 996 mm (39.21 in), later 1,006 mm (39.61 in)
- Wheelbase
  - Overall: 2,135 mm (7 ft 0 in)
- Length
  - Over beams: 7,100 mm (23 ft 3 1/2 in)
- Axle load: 11.2 and 11.8 t (11.0 and 11.6 long tons; 12.3 and 13.0 short tons) (centre)
- Adhesive weight: 22.4 and 23.5 t (22.0 and 23.1 long tons; 24.7 and 25.9 short tons)
- Service weight: 22.4 and 23.5 t (22.0 and 23.1 long tons; 24.7 and 25.9 short tons)
- Fuel capacity: 1.2 t (1.2 long tons; 1.3 short tons) coal
- Water cap.: 1.74 and 3.0 m^{3} (61 and 106 cu ft)
- Boiler pressure: 10 kp/cm^{2} (9.8 bar; 980 kPa; 140 psi)
- Heating surface
  - Firebox: 0.74 m^{2} (8.0 sq ft)
  - Evaporative: 47.0 m^{2} (506 sq ft)
- Cylinders: 2
- Cylinder size: 280 mm (11.02 in)
- Piston stroke: 508 mm (20.00 in)
- Valve gear: Stephenson, outside
- Parking brake: Exter counterweight brake
Performance figures
- Maximum speed: 45 km/h (28 mph)
Career
- Numbers: Names and works nos. DRG 88 7011–7017 (planned)
- Retired: by 1923

Class D I of the Royal Bavarian State Railways (Königlich Bayerische Staatsbahn) was a tank locomotive with two coupled axles designed for shunting. As had been specified, these locomotives were simple and robust. They had a double-frame, with water tanks being suspended between the sole bars of the front section. Because the water capacity of 1.74 m^{3} soon proved too little even for a shunter operating only within the limits of its own station, additional side tanks were added to some engines during the 1880s. The outside Stephenson valve gear moved the valves on top of the horizontal cylinders. The locomotives could be braked using an Exter counterweight brake.

The D I saw shunting duties on small and medium-sized stations, for example in Schwandorf, Straubing or Neumarkt in der Oberpfalz. 13 locomotives were still in service when the Bavarian State Railway transferred to the Deutsche Reichsbahn in 1920. Seven vehicles were allocated numbers in the DRG renumbering plan for steam locomotives, but none were implemented as they were retired in 1923.

== See also ==
- Royal Bavarian State Railways
- List of Bavarian locomotives and railbuses

== Sources ==
- Hütter, Ingo (2021). Die Dampflokomotiven der Baureihen 60 bis 91 der DRG, DRB, DB, und DR (in German). Werl: DGEG Medien. p. 297. ISBN 978-3-946594-21-5.
- v. Welser, Ludwig (1995). Bayern-Report. Band No. 5. Fürstenfeldbruck: Merker Verlag. ISBN 3-922404-78-2.
