= Prussian T 14.1 =

20th century German 2-8-2T locomotive

Prussian T 14.1, Württemberg T 14 DRG Class 93.5–12 DB Class 093, DR Class 93.1–6 PKP TKt2
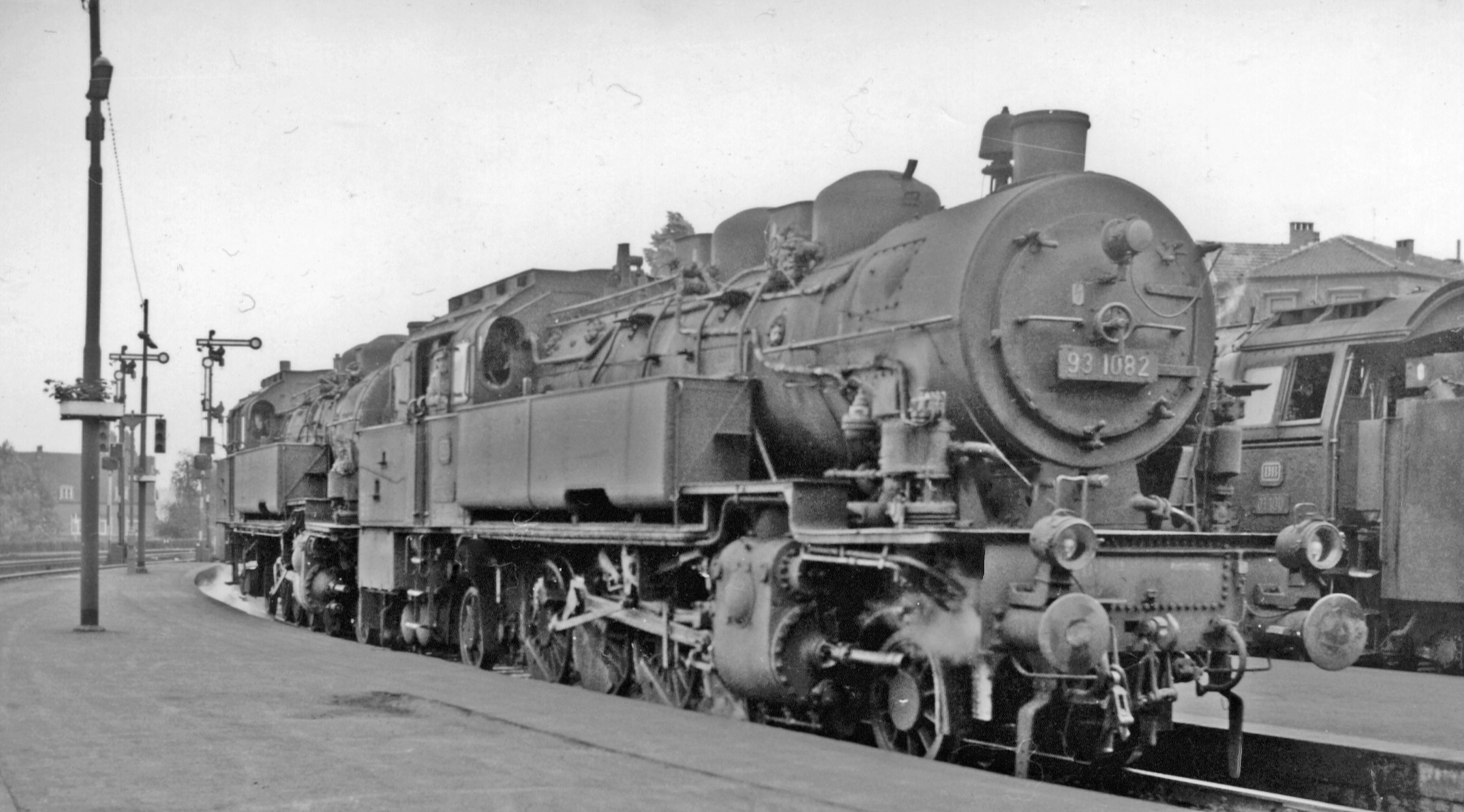
Type and origin
- Builder: Union Gießerei; Hohenzollern; Maschinenfabrik Esslingen; Hanomag; Henschel & Sohn; Berliner Maschinenbau; Schichau-Werke; Rheinmetall; Krupp; Maschinenfabrik Buckau R. Wolf
- Build date: 1918–1924
- Total produced: 768
Specifications
- Configuration
  - Whyte: 2-8-2T
  - UIC: 1′D1′ t
- Gauge: 1,435 mm (4 ft 8 1/2 in)
- Leading dia.: 1,000 mm (3 ft 3 3/8 in)
- Driver dia.: 1,350 mm (4 ft 5 1/8 in)
- Trailing dia.: 1,000 mm (3 ft 3 3/8 in)
- Length
  - Over beams: 14,500 mm (47 ft 6 3/4 in)
- Axle load: 17.9 tonnes (17.6 long tons; 19.7 short tons)
- Adhesive weight: 67.9 tonnes (66.8 long tons; 74.8 short tons)
- Service weight: 101.0 tonnes (99.4 long tons; 111.3 short tons)
- Boiler pressure: 12 bar (1.20 MPa; 174 psi)
- Heating surface
  - Firebox: 2.49 m^{2} (26.8 sq ft)
  - Evaporative: 126.62 m^{2} (1,362.9 sq ft)
- Superheater
  - Heating area: 50.28 m^{2} (541.2 sq ft)
- Cylinder size: 600 mm (23 5/8 in)
- Piston stroke: 660 mm (26 in)
Performance figures
- Maximum speed: 70 km/h (43 mph)
- Indicated power: 734 kW (998 PS; 984 hp)
Career
- Numbers: DRG 93 501–1261
- Retired: 1972

The Prussian Class T 14.1 was a German 2-8-2T, goods train, tank locomotive operated by the Prussian state railways and the Royal Württemberg State Railways. They were later incorporated by the Deutsche Reichsbahn into the DRG renumbering plan for steam locomotives as DRG Class 93.5–12.

Compared with the Prussian T 14 the axle load on the trailing wheels of the T 14.1 was initially 187.3 kN higher than that of the driving wheels. Later this was able to be reduced to 170,6 kN. The water tanks and coal bunkers were larger, so that more water and coal could be carried. Through changes in the running gear, the top speed could be increased to 70 km/h.

Because many engines had been lost due to break downs or World War I reparations, the Württemberg State Railway procured these locomotives initially for the lines from Esslingen am Neckar via Stuttgart to Ludwigsburg. They were based on the Prussian T 14.1 and differed only in a few details from their prototype.

In all 729 vehicles were procured between 1918 and 1924 for the Prussian state railways and the Prussian railway divisions of the Deutsche Reichsbahn. The Royal Württemberg State Railways and the DRG's Stuttgart division bought 39 engines between 1921 and 1922. They were given numbers 93 501 - 1261, of which 93 795–814 and 832–850 were former Württemberg machines.

The Deutsche Bundesbahn retired the last T 14.1, designated in 1968 as Class 093, that same year. In the Deutsche Reichsbahn (GDR) the engines, which had been designated in 1970 as 93.1–6, were withdrawn by 1972.

The only existing example, number 93 526, is to be found in the German Steam Locomotive Museum at Neuenmarkt-Wirsberg and is currently being restored there.

== See also ==
- Prussian state railways
- List of Prussian locomotives and railcars
