= Prussian G 8 =

Prussian locomotive

Prussian G 8 DRG Class 55.16–22 ÖBB Class 755 PKP Tp 3 FS Class 422 SNCB Type 80
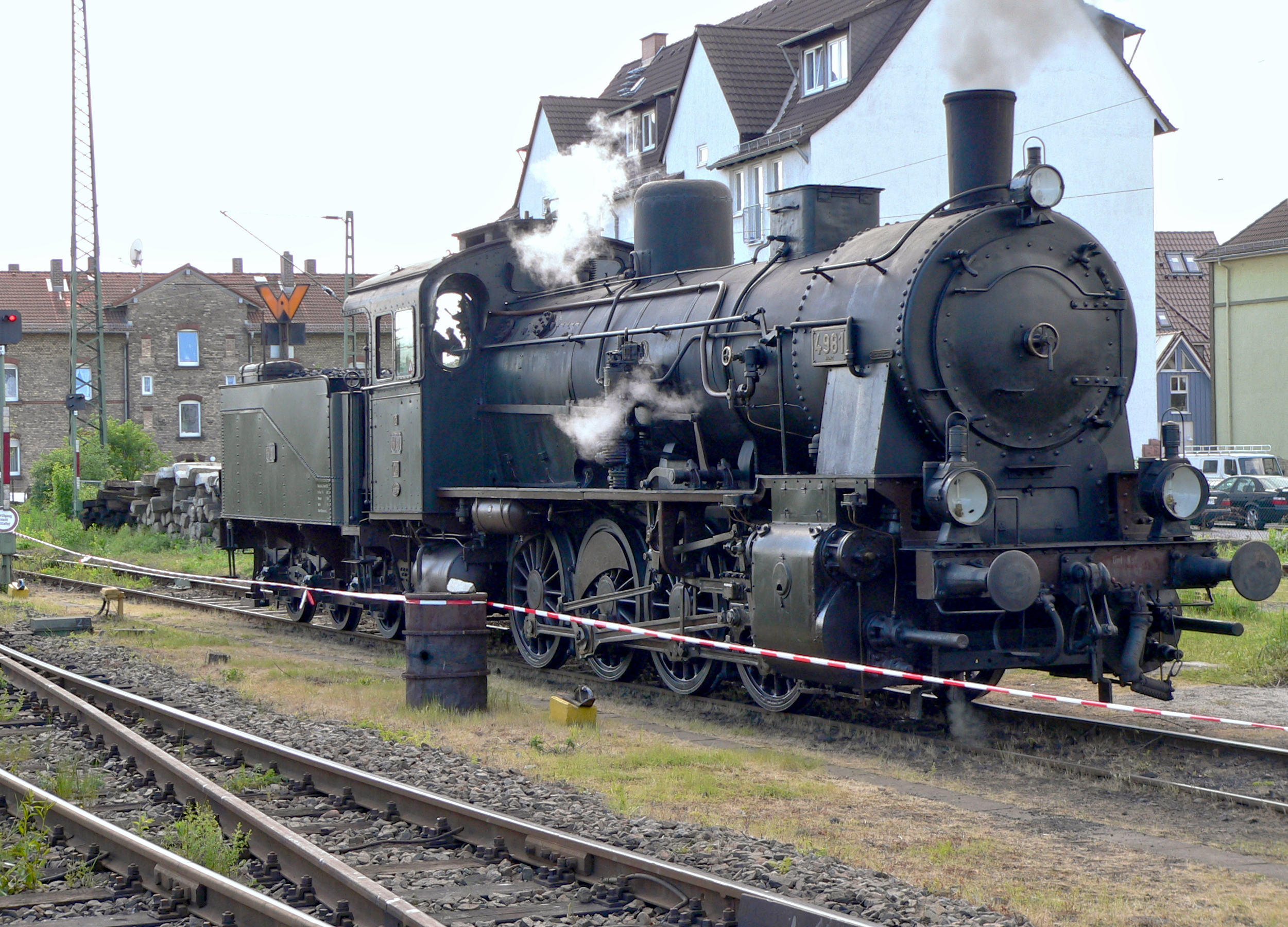
- Prussian G 8, "Mainz "
Type and origin
- Builder: AG Vulcan Stettin; Grafenstaden; Hanomag; Henschel; Schichau
- Build date: 1902–1913
- Total produced: 1,054
Specifications
  - German: G 44.14
- Gauge: 1,435 mm (4 ft 8 1/2 in) standard gauge
- Driver dia.: 1,350 mm (53.15 in)
- Length
  - Over beams: 16,938 mm (55 ft 6.9 in) (3 T 12) / 17,968 mm (58 ft 11.4 in) (3 T 16.5)
- Axle load: 14.7 t (14.5 long tons; 16.2 short tons)
- Adhesive weight: 58.5 t (57.6 long tons; 64.5 short tons)
- Service weight: 58.5 t (57.6 long tons; 64.5 short tons)
- Water cap.: 12.0 m^{3} (2,600 imp gal; 3,200 US gal) / 15.0 m^{3} (3,300 imp gal; 4,000 US gal) / 16.0 m^{3} (3,500 imp gal; 4,200 US gal) / 16.5 m^{3} (3,600 imp gal; 4,400 US gal)
- Boiler pressure: 12 bar (1,200 kPa; 170 psi)
- Heating surface
  - Firebox: 2.25 m^{2} (24.2 sq ft) / 2.35 m^{2} (25.3 sq ft)
  - Evaporative: 135.2 m^{2} (1,455 sq ft) / 140.0 m^{2} (1,507 sq ft)
- Superheater
  - Heating area: 31.7 m^{2} (341 sq ft) / 41.2 m^{2} (443 sq ft)
- Cylinder size: 575 mm (22.64 in) / 590 mm (23.23 in) / 600 mm (23.62 in)
- Piston stroke: 660 mm (25.98 in)
Performance figures
- Maximum speed: 55 km/h (34 mph)
- Indicated power: 809 kW (1,085 hp)
Career
- Numbers: DRG 55 1601–2268
- Retired: 1969

The Prussian Class G 8 locomotives were eight-coupled, superheated, freight locomotives operated by the Prussian state railways. There were two variants: the G 8 built from 1902 with a 14 tonne axle load and the "reinforced G 8" (verstärkte G 8) built from 1913 (later designated the G 8.1) with a 17-tonne (17-long-ton; 19-short-ton) axle load. The latter was the most numerous German state railway (Länderbahn) locomotive, over 5,000 examples being built.

== History ==
A total of 1,054 Prussian G 8 locomotives were built between 1902 and 1913 by various manufacturers. It was the first superheated goods train locomotive in Prussia, which is why it initially suffered from a host of teething troubles. One further problem was the restriction to a 14-tonne (14-long-ton; 15-short-ton) axle load; as a result many components had to be made too light in order to save weight. During its period of procurement constant modifications were made to the locomotives: the cylinder bore was increased from 575 to 600 mm (22.64 to 23.62 in); and the grate area, evaporative heating area and superheater area were also increased in size.

Seven engines were experimentally fitted with Stumpf parallel flow cylinders (Gleichstrom-Zylindern). Ten more were given Lenz valve gear. Neither of these variants improved on the standard design however.

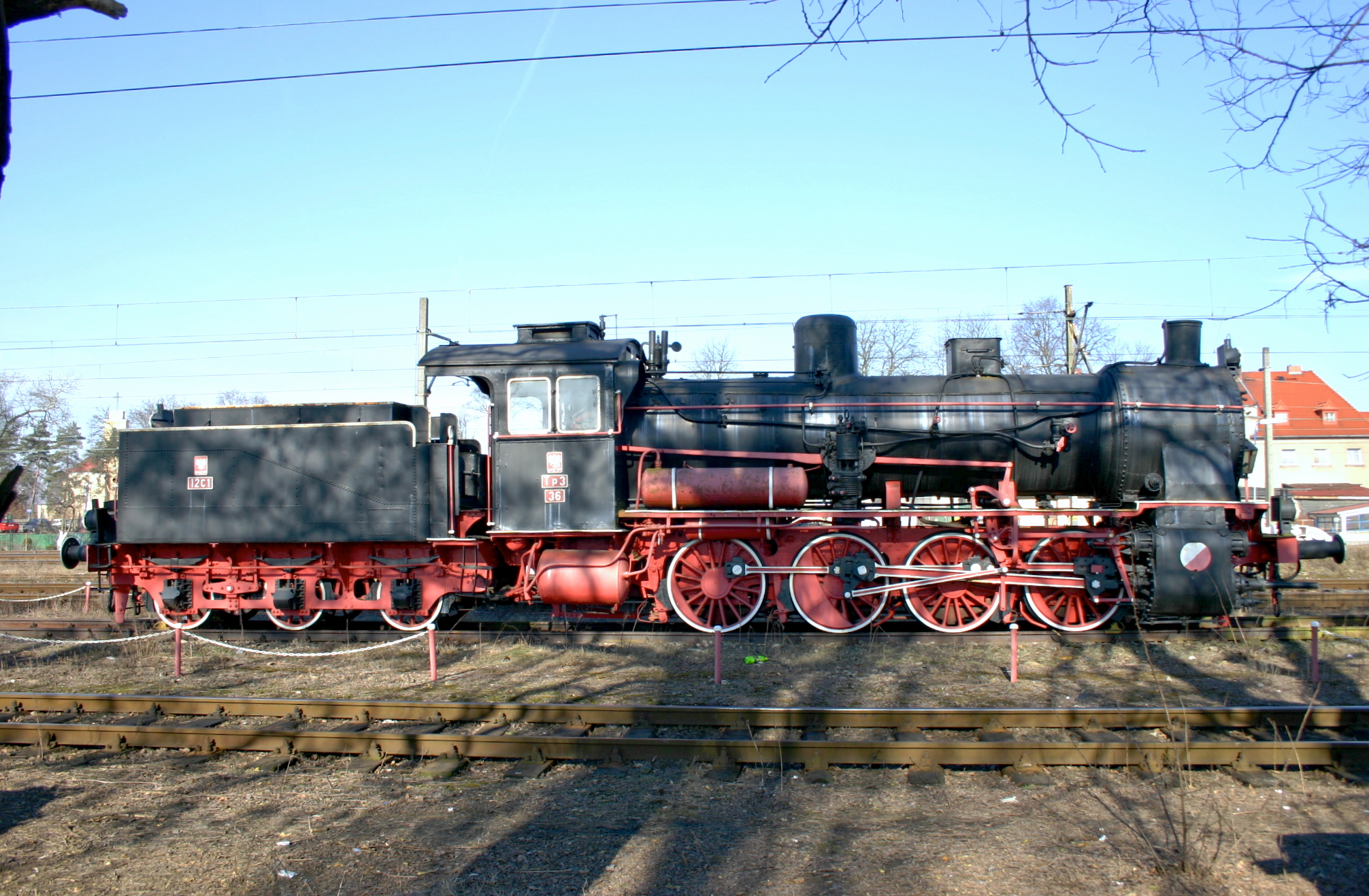
Tp 3-36, ex 55 2199, Hanomag 6712-1913

After the First World War, 336 locomotives had to be given to Germany's former enemies as reparations and 18 units to the Saar Railway. In 1925 the Deutsche Reichsbahn took over 656 locomotives as Class 55.16-22, numbering them as 55 1601 to 55 2256 in their renumbering plan. In 1935 they were joined by another twelve from the Saarbahn, nos. 55 2257 to 55 2268. In the Second World War several more came from Poland and were given the numbers of already retired engines between 55 1604 and 55 1710.

After the war the DB ended up with 205 examples, and the DR 50. In the GDR the last one was retired in 1969, whereas the DB had retired them by 1955.

After the Second World War, locomotives 55 1681, 1881 and 2180 were left in Austria. No. 55 1881 was returned to the DB in 1950. The two remaining engines formed ÖBB Class 755 in the ÖBB keeping their serial numbers. Number 755.2180 was retired in 1954, and 755.1681 not until 1957.

Locomotive Nr. 4981 Mainz (see picture in the infobox) is in working condition. Built in 1913 by Hanomag as No. 6721 and in service with the Prussian state railways as 4981 Münster, it sent was to work in 1916, along with 24 others, on the construction of the Baghdad Railway (Bagdadbahn) in Turkey, where she was given Turkish Railways number 44 079. In 1987, the still operational locomotive was purchased by German railway fans, to be hauled across Bulgaria, Yugoslavia and Austria to Germany and restored by the Darmstadt-Kranichstein Railway Museum. The journey, which had cost 47,000 deutschmarks of which 36,531 DM were invoiced by Deutsche Bahn for the leg in Germany, is documented in a book.

Two units of the 22 assigned to Italy as war reparations (and classified by the Ferrovie dello Stato Italiane as FS Class 422) survive to this day, both property of the Museo Ferroviario Piemontese; one is exposed at Savigliano, while the other is kept in a nearby railway station.

The locomotives were equipped with Prussian tenders of classes pr 3 T 12, pr 3 T 16.5 and pr 2'2' T 16.

== See also ==
- Prussian state railways
- List of Prussian locomotives and railcars
