= Prussian T 14 =

T 14 (Prussia, Alsace-Lorraine) DRG Class 93.0–4 DR Class 93.8, ÖBB Class 693, PKP TKt1 SNCB/NMBS Type 97
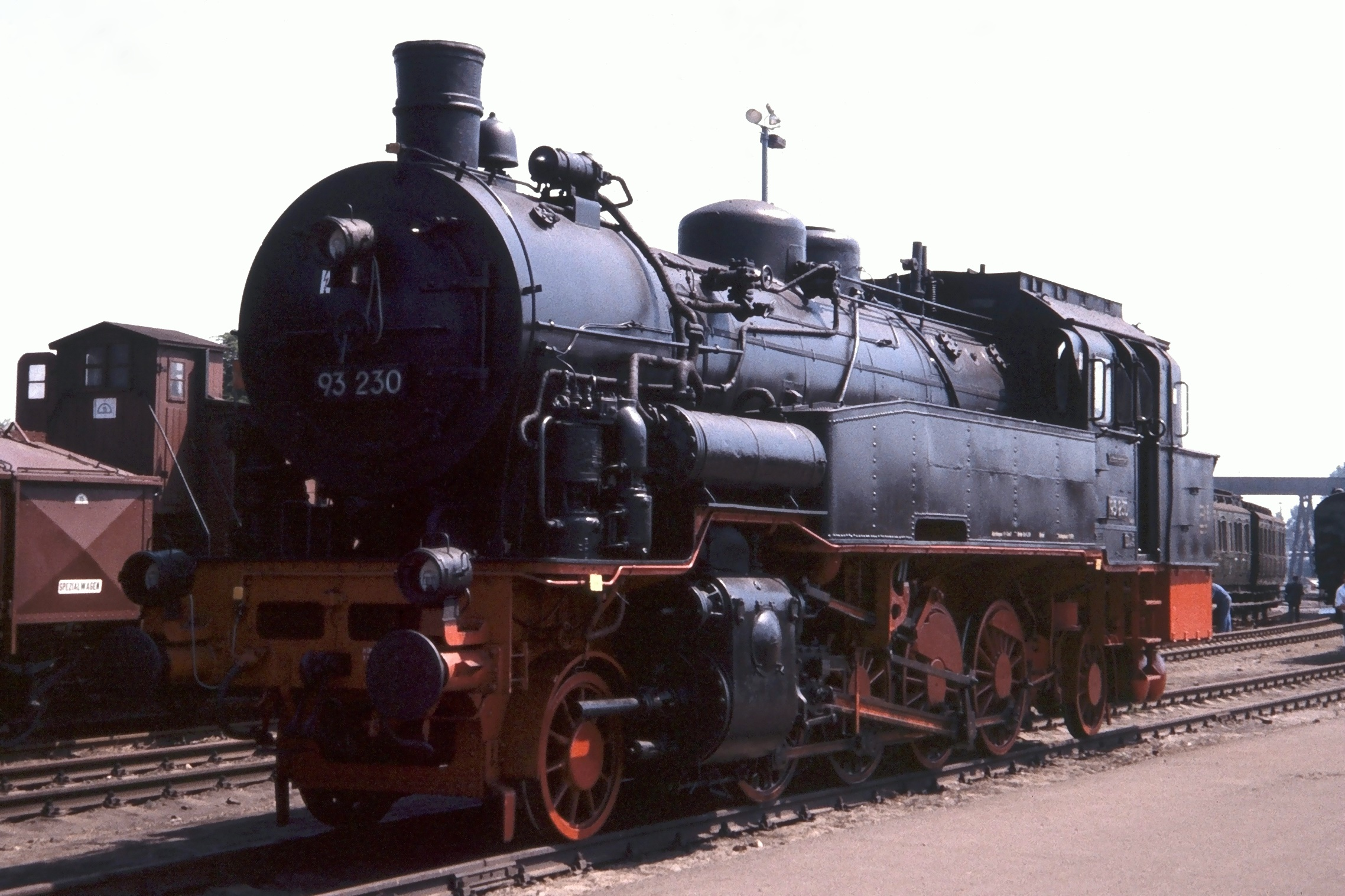
- DR 93 230 in Potsdam (1993)
Type and origin
- Builder: Union Gießerei; Henschel & Sohn; Hohenzollern; Hanomag
- Build date: 1914–1918
- Total produced: 497
Specifications
- Configuration
  - Whyte: 2-8-2T
  - UIC: 1′D1′ t
- Gauge: 1,435 mm (4 ft 8 1/2 in)
- Leading dia.: 1,000 mm (3 ft 3 3/8 in)
- Driver dia.: 1,350 mm (4 ft 5 1/8 in)
- Trailing dia.: 1,000 mm (3 ft 3 3/8 in)
- Length
  - Over beams: 13,800 mm (45 ft 3 1/4 in)
- Axle load: 16.9 tonnes (16.6 long tons; 18.6 short tons)
- Adhesive weight: 63.4 tonnes (62.4 long tons; 69.9 short tons)
- Service weight: 97.6 tonnes (96.1 long tons; 107.6 short tons)
- Boiler pressure: 12 bar (1.20 MPa; 174 psi)
- Heating surface
  - Firebox: 2.49 m^{2} (26.8 sq ft)
  - Evaporative: 126.62 m^{2} (1,362.9 sq ft)
- Superheater
  - Heating area: 50.28 m^{2} (541.2 sq ft)
- Cylinder size: 600 mm (23 5/8 in)
- Piston stroke: 660 mm (26 in)
Performance figures
- Maximum speed: 65 km/h (40 mph)
- Indicated power: 734 kW (998 PS; 984 hp)
Career
- Numbers: DRG 93 001–459
- Retired: 1971

The Prussian T 14s were German, 2-8-2T, goods train, tank locomotives operated by the Prussian state railways and the Imperial Railways in Alsace-Lorraine. They were later incorporated by the Deutsche Reichsbahn into their renumbering plan as Class 93.0–4.

These locomotives were intended for goods traffic and Sunday excursion services on the lines of the Berlin Stadtbahn. Later the T 14 was also procured by other railway divisions for goods trains on main lines and even for passenger services. In all, 457 of this class was built for the Prussian state railways and 40 for the Imperial Railways in Alsace-Lorraine between 1914 and 1918.

Due to uneven weight distribution the axle load on the leading wheels was 169.7 kN higher than that of the driving wheels.

The Deutsche Reichsbahn took over 400 T 14s from Prussia and six from the Imperial Railways in Alsace-Lorraine as 93 001 to 93 406. The T 14s from Alsace-Lorraine were given numbers 93 094, 188–191 and 237. In 1927 two more T 14s were acquired from the Farge-Vegesack Railway and numbered as 93 407 and 408; and in 1935 locomotives 93 409 to 93 417 from the Saar Railway were added. In World War II several T 14s came from Poland and Belgium into the DRB fleet as 93 418 to 93 450. After the Second World War the Deutsche Reichsbahn (GDR) incorporated further T 14s, which came from France and Belgium, as 93 451 to 93 459.

The Deutsche Bundesbahn began retiring them in 1960. In the East German Deutsche Reichsbahn the last ones were even given new computerised numbers in 1970 and classified as DR Class 93.8. The last T 14 there retired in 1971.

After the Second World War locomotives 93 058, 324 and 405 were left in Austria. As a result, the Austrian Federal Railway (ÖBB) formed them into their ÖBB Class 693 retaining their serial numbers. Number 693.058 was retired as early as 1953, the other two engines remained in the ÖBB fleet until 1958.

Locomotive 93 230 has been preserved and belongs to the Dresden Transport Museum. Another unit, PKP TKt1-63, is preserved in Poland at Chabówka railroad museum.

== See also ==
- Prussian state railways
- List of Prussian locomotives and railcars
