= Saxon IV T =

Class of 91 German 2-4-2T locomotives

Sächsische IV T DRG Class 71.3
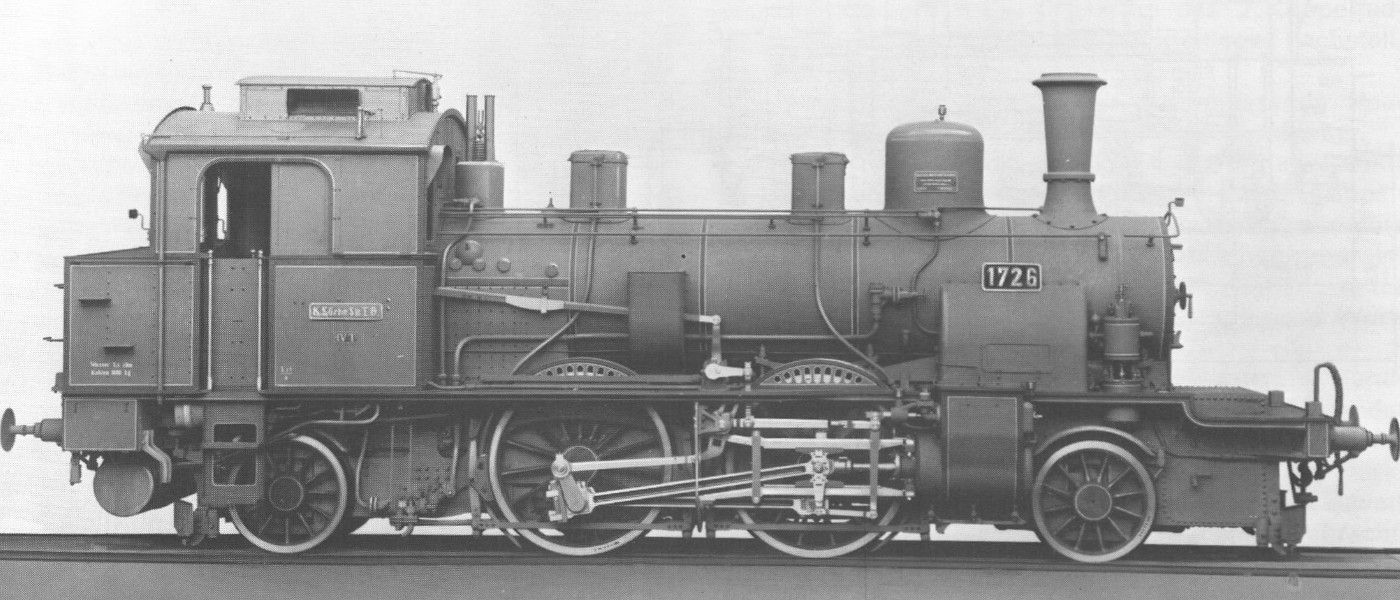
Type and origin
- Builder: Sächsische Maschinenfabrik
- Build date: 1897–1909
- Total produced: 91
Specifications
- Gauge: 1,435 mm (4 ft 8 1/2 in)
- Driver dia.: 1,590 mm (5 ft 2 5/8 in)
- Carrying wheel diameter: 1,065 mm (3 ft 5 7/8 in)
- Wheelbase
  - Overall: 6,800 mm (22 ft 3 3/4 in)
- Length
  - Over beams: 11,770 mm (38 ft 7 1/2 in)
- Height: 4,150 mm (13 ft 7 3/8 in)
- Axle load: 15.4 tonnes (15.2 long tons; 17.0 short tons)
- Adhesive weight: 30.6 tonnes (30.1 long tons; 33.7 short tons)
- Service weight: 60.1 tonnes (59.2 long tons; 66.2 short tons)
- Fuel capacity: 1,600 kg (3,500 lb) of coal
- Water cap.: 5,600 or 7,500 litres (1,200 or 1,600 imp gal; 1,500 or 2,000 US gal)
- Boiler
  - Tube plates: 4,000 mm (13 ft 1 1/2 in)
- No. of heating tubes: 171
- Boiler pressure: 12 kg/cm^{2} (1.2 MPa; 170 psi)
- Heating surface
  - Firebox: 1.56 m^{2} (16.8 sq ft)
  - Radiative: 8.07 m^{2} (86.9 sq ft)
  - Tubes: 85.91 m^{2} (924.7 sq ft)
  - Evaporative: 94.01 m^{2} (1,011.9 sq ft)
- Cylinders: 2
- Cylinder size: 430 millimetres (16 15/16 in)
- Piston stroke: 600 millimetres (23 5/8 in)
- Valve gear: Heusinger
Performance figures
- Maximum speed: 75 km/h (47 mph)
Career
- Numbers: IV T 1701–1791; DRG 71 301–385
- Retired: bis 1955

The Royal Saxon State Railway designated four-coupled tank locomotives for passenger train service as class IV T (four-T), and the Deutsche Reichsbahn subsequently grouped these locomotives into DRG Class 71.3 in 1925.

== History ==
In terms of design, the locomotives were based on the class T 5.1 of the Prussian State Railways. Despite the defects that emerged, such as the uneven running at high speed, which led to derailments, 91 copies of this locomotive were procured from 1897 to 1909 in several lots. On Saxon routes it is not so much a high top speed that matters, but rather good acceleration due to the relatively short distance between the stops.

The first locomotives were named after small towns in Saxony and were listed as VIII bb T; in 1900 the designation was changed to IV T.

Locomotive 1727 was the leading locomotive in the serious accident at Braunsdorf between Braunsdorf and Frankenberg on the Roßwein–Niederwiesa railway line on 14 December 1913. The lead locomotive was repaired – hard to believe, if you look at the accident – but not until 1933 when it became DRG 71 322.

The Deutsche Reichsbahn took over 85 locomotives of this type and gave them the numbers 71 301 to 71 385. Six locomotives were taken out of service shortly before the re-designation; another wave of retirement followed around 1930. After World War II, two locomotives remained with ČSD, while ten locomotives came to the Deutsche Reichsbahn. The locomotives were retired by the Deutsche Reichsbahn by 1955; none of them survived.

== Technical features ==
The two-ring boiler provided saturated steam to the two cylinders which had a bore of 430 mm (16 15/16 in) and a stroke of 600 mm (23 5/8 in). The connecting rod drove the second axle via Heusinger (Walschaerts) valve gear. The driving wheels were of 1,590 mm (5 ft 2 1/2 in) diameter.

The fixed wheelbase of the coupled driving axles was 2,000 mm (6 ft 6 3/4 in), the total wheelbase was 6,800 mm (22 ft 3 3/4 in). The two carrying axles were designed as Adam axles.

The first delivery series had a 12-millimetre (1/2 in) thick riveted plate frame; from 1902, the plate frames were 20 millimetres (13/16 in) thick. In the last series, cutouts were also left in the firebox area.

In addition to handbrake, the Westinghouse brake, which acted on both sets of coupling wheels, was available. The air pump required for this was arranged on the right-hand side of the smokebox.

Between the frames was a well tank with a capacity of 5,600 litres (1,200 imp gal; 1,500 US gal); from 1906 the locomotives were supplied with additional water tanks on the side, increasing the capacity to 7,500 litres (1,600 imp gal; 2,000 US gal). All previously delivered machines were later retrofitted in this way. The coal supply of 1,600 kilograms (3,500 lb) was subsequently increased in some locomotives and / or a coal box attachment was added so that a maximum of 2 cubic metres (71 ft^{3}) of coal could be loaded.

The first delivery series had a driver's cab with a large door cutout; from 1902, the locomotives were instead equipped with sliding windows on the side. The ventilation attachment on the driver's cab roof was subsequently supplemented by four ventilation hoods.
