= Prussian G 12.1 =

Prussia, Alsace-Lorraine G 12.1 DRG Class 58.0 SNCF 1-150.B Belgian State Railways Type 92
Type and origin
- Builder: Henschel
- Build date: 1915–1917
- Total produced: 33
Specifications
- Configuration
  - Whyte: 2-10-0
  - German: G 56.17
- Gauge: 1,435 mm (4 ft 8 1/2 in)
- Leading dia.: 1,000 mm (3 ft 3 3/8 in)
- Driver dia.: 1,400 mm (4 ft 7 1/8 in)
- Length
  - Over beams: 20,340 mm (66 ft 8 3/4 in)
- Axle load: 17.1 t (16.8 long tons; 18.8 short tons)
- Adhesive weight: 84.3 t (83.0 long tons; 92.9 short tons)
- Service weight: 98.8 t (97.2 long tons; 108.9 short tons)
- Water cap.: 21.5 m^{3} (4,700 imp gal; 5,700 US gal)
- Boiler pressure: 14 kgf/cm^{2} (1.37 MPa; 199 lbf/in^{2})
- Heating surface
  - Firebox: 3.28 m^{2} (35.3 sq ft)
  - Evaporative: 195.63 m^{2} (2,105.7 sq ft)
- Superheater
  - Heating area: 77.72 m^{2} (836.6 sq ft)
- Cylinders: 3
- Cylinder size: 560 mm (22 1/16 in)
- Piston stroke: 660 mm (26 in)
Performance figures
- Maximum speed: 60 km/h (37 mph)
- Indicated power: 1,203 kW 1,640 PS (1,210 kW; 1,620 hp)
Career
- Numbers: Erfurt 5551–5554; Cassel 5551–5555; Saarbrücken 5551–5562; EL 5551–5562; DRG 58 001 – 58 015
- Retired: 1957

The Prussian G 12.1 was a German steam locomotive built for the Prussian state railways during the First World War and was the largest Prussian freight locomotive with a 2-10-0 wheel arrangement. It had three cylinders, the two outer ones driving the third axle and the inner one the second axle.

== History ==
As early as 1913 there was a requirement for a powerful goods train locomotive in several of the divisions within the Prussian state railways. This need grew as a result of the First World War; at the same time however the delivery of the first engine by Henschel-Werke was delayed until 1915.

Between 1915 and 1917, 21 vehicles were built for Prussia and 12 for the Imperial Railways in Alsace-Lorraine. All the locomotives were manufactured by Henschel. The Prussian locos went to the Erfurt (4), Cassel (5) and Saarbrücken (12) divisions. Further production was then ceased in favour of the G 12.

The Deutsche Reichsbahn took over 15 vehicles from Prussia as the DRG Class 58.0 and gave them operating numbers 58 001 to 58 015. The majority of locomotives were retired by 1935. Numbers 58 002 and 58 005 ended up in the Deutsche Reichsbahn in East Germany after the Second World War. The last one, number 58 005, was retired in 1957.

Five of the Saarbrücken Division locomotives had to be surrendered to France as reparations. They went to the Chemins de fer de l'Est, who numbered then 5101–5105. They sold them to the Administration des chemins de fer d'Alsace et de Lorraine in 1925, who renumbered then 5546–5550, below the G 12.1 locomotives that they had had from new, the higher numbers already being occupied by G 12 locomotives. They were allocated to the Hausbergen and Thionville locomotive depots and used to haul heavy heavy coal and ore trains. In 1938, all 17 passed to the SNCF, who renumbered them as 1–150.B.546 to 1–150.B.562 and scrapped them by 1955.

One Erfurt Division locomotive was surrendered to Belgium, where the Belgian State Railways classified it as Type 92, and numbered it 9252.

The engines were equipped with tenders of Class pr 2′2′ T 21.5.

== Saxon XIII H ==
Saxon XIII H DRG Class 58.1 SNCF 1-150.D
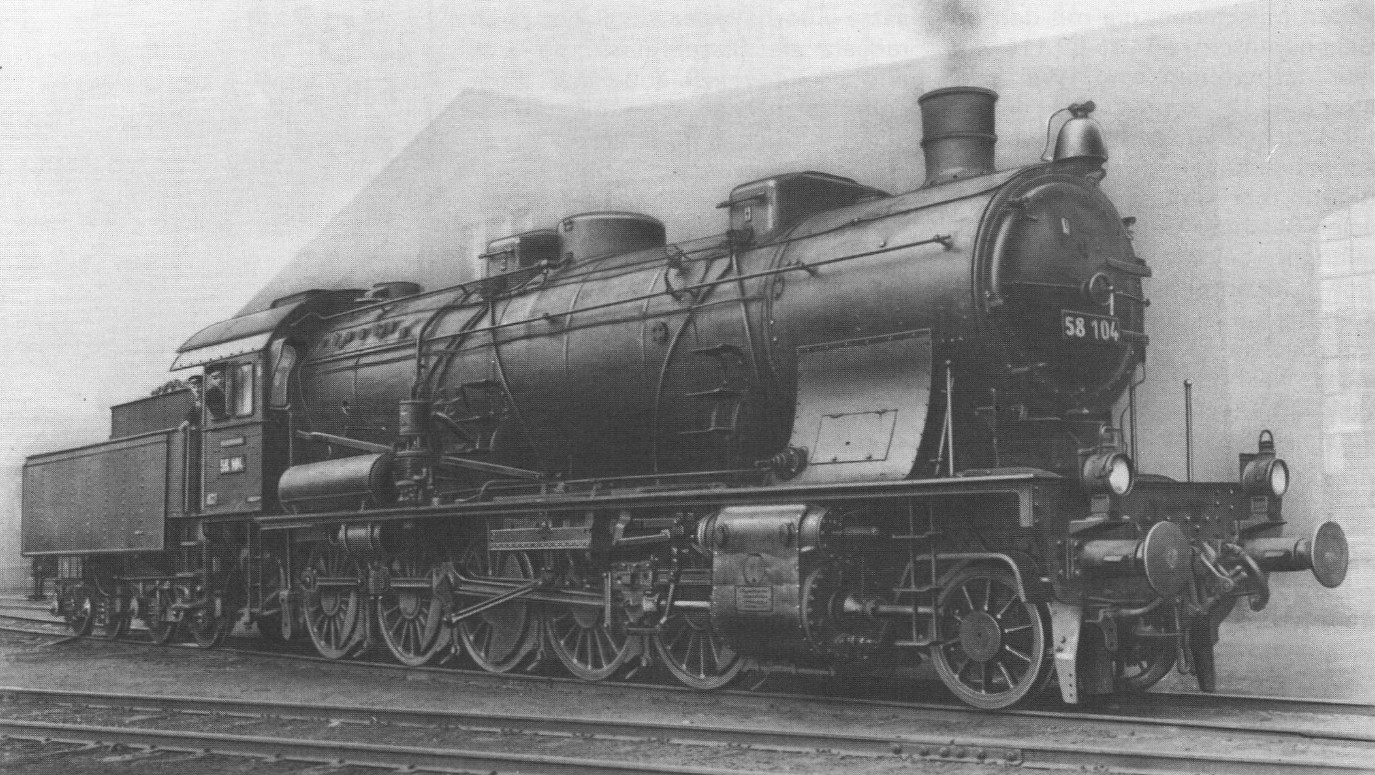
Type and origin
- Builder: Hartmann
- Build date: 1917
- Total produced: 20
Specifications
- Length
  - Over beams: 20,703 mm (67 ft 11 in)
- Service weight: 101.1 t (99.5 long tons; 111.4 short tons)
- Water cap.: 21.0 m^{3} (4,600 imp gal; 5,500 US gal)
- Heating surface
  - Evaporative: 210.51 m^{2} (2,265.9 sq ft)
- Superheater
  - Heating area: 81.26 m^{2} (874.7 sq ft)
Career
- Numbers: K.Sä.St.E.: 1165–1184 Est: 5201–5206; DRG 58 101 – 58 114
- data shown where different from G 12.1

In 1917 the Royal Saxon State Railways ordered Hartmann to build 20 locomotives based on the Prussian G 12.1. The engines were classified as the Saxon XIII H but had numerous improvements compared with their prototypes. They were given a larger total heating area, a bigger superheater area and new tubing. They were therefore heavier than the Prussian locomotives and were the first German locomotives to exceed 100 tonnes. They were supplied with sä 2′2′ T 21 tenders.

The 20 locomotives were given railway numbers 1165–1184. After the First World War six units had to be given to France as reparations. The Deutsche Reichsbahn took over the remaining 14 vehicles as DRG Class 58.1 with operating numbers 58 101 to 58 114. The locomotives in France were allocated to the Chemin de fer de l'Est who numbered them 5201 to 5206. They all passed to the SNCF in 1938 who renumbered them 1–150.D.201 to 1–150.D.206.

The German locomotives had a short life of 16 years – the DRG retired them in 1933 and 1934. During the Second World War the SNCF locomotives were sent to Saxony as so-called 'loan locomotives' (Leihlokomotiven) They remained in East Germany after the war and went into the DR fleet. They were retired by 1951, although it was April 1953 before the SNCF wrote the locomotives off its books.

Like Prussia, after the initial series, Saxony only ordered further batches of its successor, the Prussian G 12, although it was also designated the Class XIII H. The Chemins de fer de l'Est however, used the design as the basis for its 5211-series (later 150.001-series), a class of 195 locomotives built 1926 to 1932 by French manufacturers.

== See also ==
- List of Prussian locomotives and railcars
- Württemberg G 12
