= Prussian T 16 =

Prussian T 16; Alsace-Lorraine T 16; DR Baureihe 94.2–4; PKP TKw1; SNCB Type 98 (17/53)
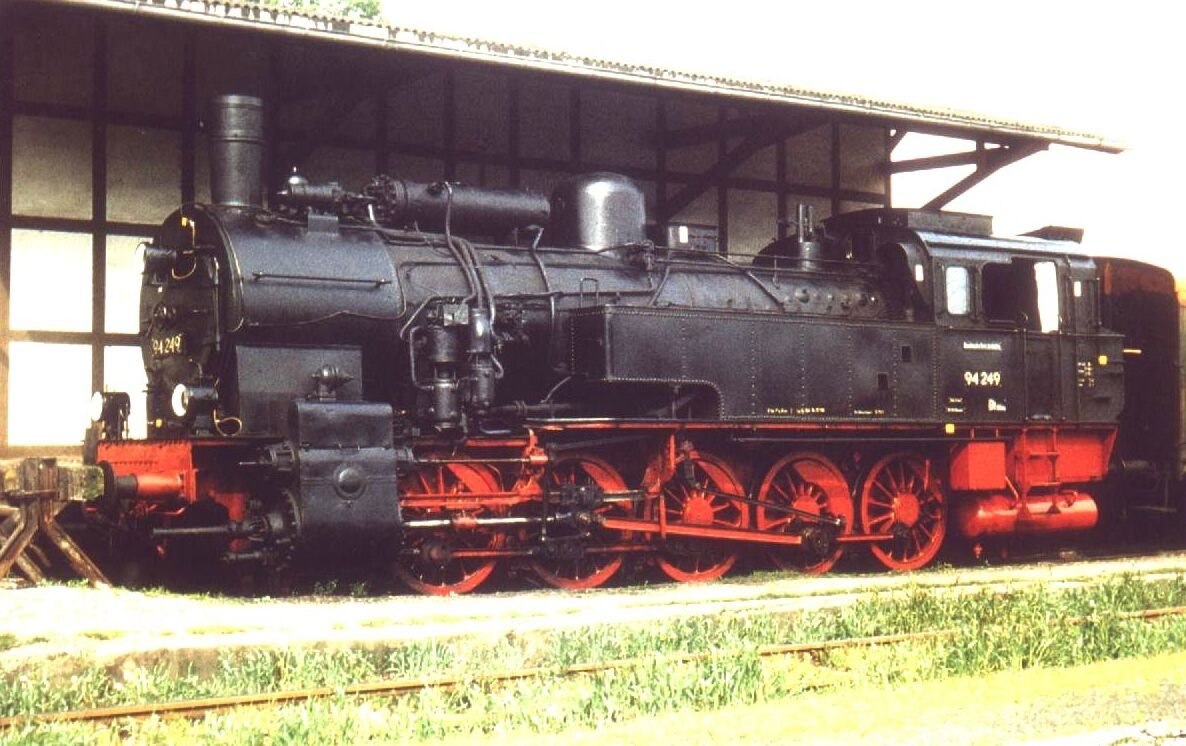
- 94 249, (BMAG 4106 of 1908), the only preserved T 16, and an example of the earlier type
Type and origin
- Builder: Berliner Maschinenbau (343); Grafenstaden (12)
- Build date: 1905–1913
- Total produced: Prussia: 343; AL: 12
Specifications
  - German: Gt 55.17
- Gauge: 1,435 mm (4 ft 8 1/2 in)
- Driver dia.: 1,350 mm (4 ft 5 1/8 in)
- Length
  - Over beams: 12,500 mm (41 ft 1/4 in)
- Axle load: 16.5 tonnes (16.2 long tons; 18.2 short tons)
- Adhesive weight: 75.6 tonnes (74.4 long tons; 83.3 short tons)
- Service weight: 75.6 tonnes (74.4 long tons; 83.3 short tons)
- Fuel capacity: 2.5 tonnes (5,500 lb) of coal
- Water cap.: 7.0 m^{3} (1,500 imp gal; 1,800 US gal)
- Boiler pressure: 12 kgf/cm^{2} (1.18 MPa; 171 psi)
- Heating surface
  - Firebox: 2.22 m^{2} (23.9 sq ft)
  - Evaporative: 134.14 m^{2} (1,443.9 sq ft)
- Superheater
  - Heating area: 41.40 m^{2} (445.6 sq ft)
- Cylinders: 2
- Cylinder size: 610 mm (24 in)
- Piston stroke: 660 mm (26 in)
Performance figures
- Maximum speed: 40 km/h (25 mph)
- Indicated power: 1,070 PS (787 kW; 1,060 hp)
Career
- Numbers: DR 94 201–464, 468–490, 501
- Retired: 1968

The Prussian T16 locomotives were ten-coupled superheated freight tank locomotives of the Prussian State Railways. They were later renumbered in the 94.2–4 by Deutsche Reichsbahn

== History ==
The development of the T16 locomotives was influenced by the ideas of Karl Gölsdorf. The design included three Gölsdorf axles – the first, third, and fifth – and enabled elimination of the articulated frame that had been used on the Prussian T 15. While mainly bought for banking trains up steep gradients, they were also used for freight trains and shunting. They proved to be more powerful and economical than the T 15 class.

Between 1905 and 1913, 343 T 16 locomotives were built by Berliner Maschinenbau for the Prussian State Railways, and 12 by Elsässische Maschinenbau-Gesellschaft Grafenstaden for the Imperial Railways in Alsace-Lorraine. During construction, some design changes were made; for example the drive was moved from the fourth axle to the third in order to reduce the length and weight of the connecting rod and therefore to reduce hammer blow. This also required reducing the number of Gölsdorf axles to two – on the second and fourth axles. These early locomotives were sometimes referred to as "T 16.0".

After the World War I, 65 locomotives were surrendered, including 57 to Poland, and three to the Free City of Danzig. The PKP classified its T 16 and T 16.1 as TKw1 (the T 16.1s were not split out into TKw2 until 1949). Belgium received 17 T16.0 as war reparations (17/53 of the SNCB Type 98).

The Deutsche Reichsbahn renumbered the T 16s 94 201–467, although the last three were actually T 16.1s – this error was corrected in 1934. In addition one T 16 locomotive had been renumbered as a T 16.1 in error, but 94 501 was withdrawn in 1931 before the error was corrected. Locomotives 94 462–464 came from Alsace-Lorraine. Eight T 16s remained in Alsace-Lorraine and eventually became SNCF 1-050.TA.101 to 112. In addition the SNCF inherited four T 16s from the Chemins de fer du Nord (2-050.TB.1 to 4, ex Nord 5.501–5.504) and twelve from the Chemins de fer de Paris à Lyon et à la Méditerranée (5-050.TA.1 to 12, ex PLM 5.AT.1 to 12, previously PLM 5801–5812) that the two railway companies had received as war reparations.

Many of the DR locomotives were retired in the 1930s.

During World War II, a number of Polish locomotives, and one Belgium locomotive were taken into stock, as 94 468–490. One Belgian locomotive was in the Soviet zone at the end of the war and became 94 1811 in the East German Deutsche Reichsbahn fleet. In Poland, there were 39 TKw1 class locomotive in the PKP fleet; the last TKw1 locomotive was retired in 1970.

== Preservation ==
Most T 16s stayed in the west; the last Deutsche Bundesbahn 94.2 was retired in 1955. The few locomotives that stayed in the east had been retired by 1968. The last locomotive, 94 249 was transferred to the Dresden Transport Museum. In 1983, it was de-accessioned and traded to Heiligenstädter Eisenbahnverein (Heiligenstadt Railway Club) for 60 tonnes of scrap. On 26 May 1994, the State of Thuringia declared it a listed monument.
