= Prussian T 5 =

The Prussian state railways grouped a variety of different types of passenger tank locomotive into its Prussian Class T 5. Several examples of the sub-classes T 5.1 and T 5.2 transferred into the Deutsche Reichsbahn as DRG Classes 71.0 and 72.0.

== Prussian T 5.1 ==
No less than 309 Class T 5.1 engines, which had a 2-4-2T wheel arrangement, were built by Henschel from 1895 to 1905. They were initially procured for the Berlin Stadtbahn routes, in order to replace the older 2-4-0T and 0-4-2T locomotives which were no longer powerful enough. Later, they were also given to many other railway divisions. Another 20 locomotives went into the Grand Duchy of Oldenburg State Railways as Oldenburg T 5.1s.

Following the appearance of more powerful engines the T 5.1 was ousted from branch line services. Although there were still 115 locomotives shown in the 1923 DRG renumbering plan for steam locomotives as numbers 71 001–018, 021–028, 032–119 and 72 016, by 1925 this had reduced to just 26 engines with running numbers 71 001–026. By 1930 all of them had been retired.

In 1934, the range of numbers from 71 001 to 71 006 was re-used for the standard locomotives (Einheitslokomotiven) of the DRG Class 71.0.

In World War II four T 5.1 engines from Poland (ex-PKP class OKe1) were recorded as 71 7001–7004 in the Reichsbahn fleet, but the locomotives did not carry those numbers.

There are no surviving examples of the Prussian Class T 5.1.

== Prussian T 5.2 ==
The locomotives of Prussian Class T 5.2 (also known as the Wannsee Variant) were built by the firms of Henschel (30 examples) and Grafenstaden (6 examples). They were intended for traffic between Berlin and Potsdam and were to replace the T 5.1s on the Berlin Stadtbahn.

A 4-4-0T wheel arrangement promised to result in better riding qualities than those of the T 5.1. However the T 5.2s were less suited to running cab first due to the lack of a trailing axle and the large driving wheels, and so their employment was restricted to the Berlin ring.

In 1923 the Reichsbahn had still intended to include 20 locomotives as numbers 71 019, 020, 029 - 031 and 72 001–015 in their renumbering plan, but only took over two of them into their final numbering scheme in 1925, with numbers 72 001 and 72 002. They were retired by 1926.

In 1941 two more engines from the Eutin-Lübeck Railway Company, built by Henschel in 1911, came into the Reichsbahn fleet. They were given numbers 72 001 and 002. One of the two engines, which had both been converted to superheated working, remained in the ownership of the Deutsche Reichsbahn in East Germany until 1955.

No examples of the Prussian Class T 5.2 locomotive have survived.

== Prussian T 5.2 (Superheated) ==
The superheated variant of the Prussian T 5.was the first superheated tank locomotive in the Prussian state railways. They were built to a Schmidt design and had better performance than the saturated steam variant of the T 5.2. Externally they differed from the wet steam T 5.2 locomotive in that they had a higher smokebox, a different location for the steam dome and a longer wheelbase. The two locomotives were built in 1900 by Henschel. They were not taken into Reichsbahn service.

== 0-6-0T Prussian T 5 of the Main-Neckar Railway ==
The Prussian T 5 locomotives for the Main-Neckar Railway, that went into Prussian ownership in 1866, were intended for the route between Weinheim and Fürth (Odenwald) (Weschnitz Valley Railway). But they ended up being used on the line between Frankfurt and Heidelberg, because difficulties occurred on the steep sections of the route. The six locomotives had been built in 1896 and 1898 by the Maschinenbau-Gesellschaft Karlsruhe.

No Main-Neckar variants of the 0-6-0T Prussian Class T 5 have been preserved.

== 2-6-0T Prussian T 5 of the Main-Neckar Railway ==
In addition to the 0-6-0T locomotives, four 2-6-0T engines from the Main-Neckar Railway also entered the Prussian state railways. They had been built in 1899 by the Maschinenbau-Gesellschaft Karlsruhe. From 1906 they were numbered as "Mainz 6691–6694".

== Prussian T 5 of the Lower Elbe Railway ==
The T 5s of the Lower Elbe Railway Company were passenger tank locomotives with a 2-4-2T wheel arrangement. The ten locomotives had been ordered for services on the Harburg–Cuxhaven line in 1880 by the Elsässischen Maschinenbau-Gesellschaft Grafenstaden. From 1906 they were given the running numbers "Altona 6601–6609" and were retired by 1911.

== Technical data ==
Prussian T 5
	T 5.1 DRG Class 71.0	T 5.2 DRG Class 72.0	T 5.2 Superheated	T 5 Main-Neckar 0-6-0T	T 5 Main-Neckar 2-6-0T	T 5 Lower Elbe Railway
Numbers:	DRG 71 001–026	72 001–002			Mainz 6691–6694	Altona 6601–6609
Quantity:	309	36	2	6	4	10
Manufacturer:	Henschel	Henschel, Grafenstaden	Henschel	Karlsruhe	Karlsruhe	Grafenstaden
Year(s) of manufacture:	1895–1905	1899–1900	1900	1896	1899	1880
Retired:	1930	1955	um 1920			1911
Wheel arrangement:	2-4-2T	4-4-0T	4-4-0T	0-6-0T	2-6-0T	2-4-2T
Axle arrangement:	1'B1'	2'B	2'B	C	1'C	1B1
Track gauge:	1,435 mm (4 ft 8 1/2 in)					
Length over buffers:	11,685 mm	10,856 mm	11,606 mm	9,934 mm		10,800 mm
Service weight:	53.2 t	56.4 t	60.6 t	45.5 t	51.0 t	51.8 t
Adhesive weight:	31.4 t	31.6 t	31.6 t	45.5 t	44.0 t	27.0 t
Axle load:	15.7 t	16.7 t	15.8 t	15.2 t		
Top speed:	75 km/h	75 km/h	75 km/h	65 km/h	65 km/h	80 km/h
Driving wheel diameter:	1,600 mm	1,600 mm	1,600 mm	1,726 mm	1,726 mm	1,730 mm
Leading wheel diameter:	1,000 mm	800 mm	850 mm			
Trailing wheel diameter:	1,000 mm					
Cylinder bore:	430 mm	440 mm	440 mm	430 mm	430 mm	440 mm
Piston stroke:	600 mm					
Boiler overpressure:	12 bar					9 bar
Grate area:	1.68 m^{2}	1.69 m^{2}	1.54 m^{2}	1.54 m^{2}	2.20 m^{2}	
Superheater area:			29.00 m^{2}			
Evaporative heating area:	95.09 m^{2}	100.68 m^{2}	109.40 m^{2}	96.40 m^{2}	106.00 m^{2}	110.8 m^{2}

== See also ==
- Prussian state railways
- List of Prussian locomotives and railcars
