= Prussian G 7.1 =

Type of steam locomotive

Prussian G 7.1 DRG Class 55.0–6 ÖBB Class 655 SNCB Type 71
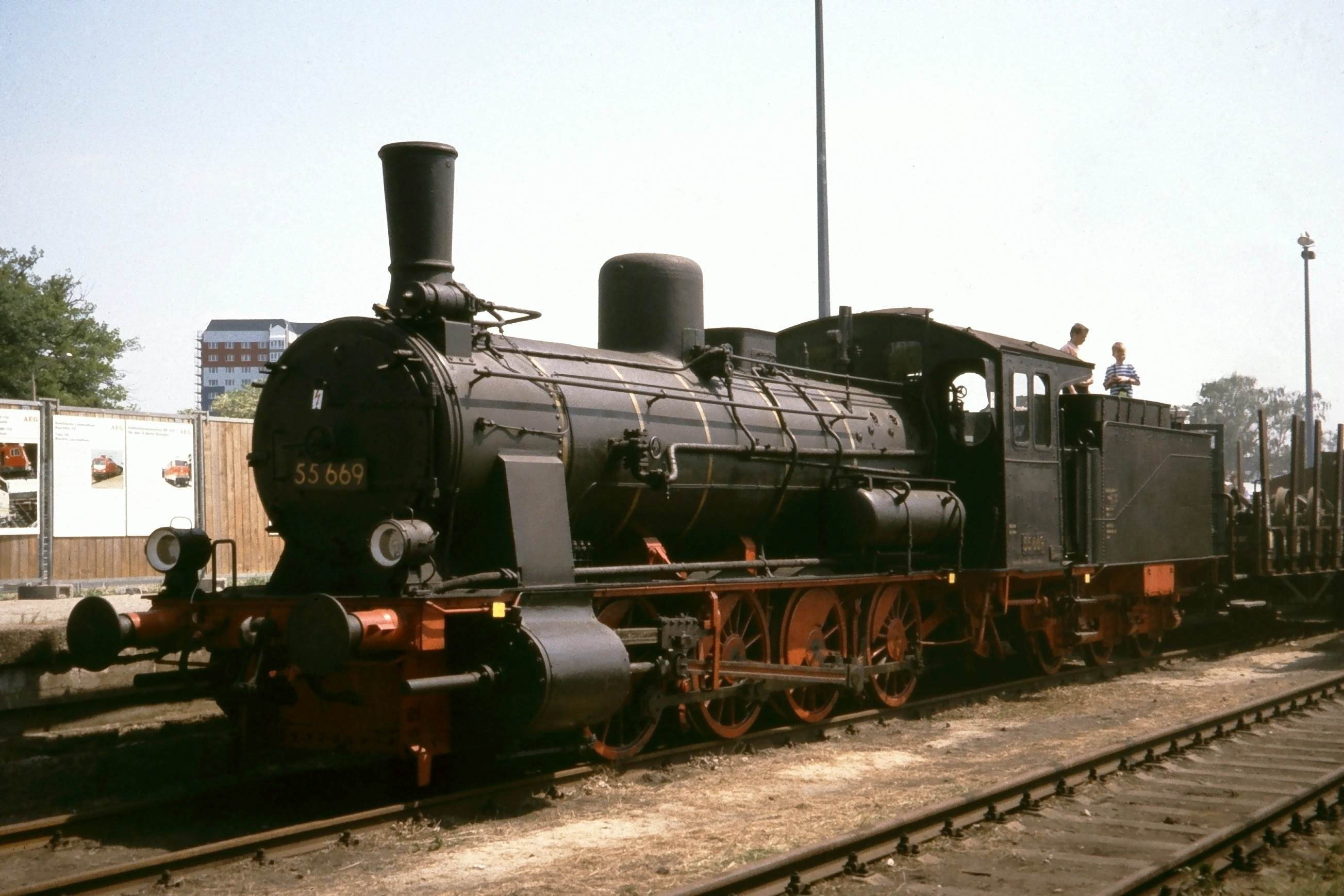
- 55 669 in Potsdam (17.5.93)
Type and origin
- Builder: Vulcan; Hanomag; Schichau-Werke; Linke-Hofmann; Sächsische Maschinenfabrik; Berliner Maschinenbau; Henschel & Sohn; Hohenzollern; Orenstein & Koppel; Borsig; Arnold Jung Lokomotivfabrik
- Build date: 1893–1917
- Total produced: 1,202
Specifications
- Configuration
  - Whyte: 0-8-0
- Gauge: 1,435 mm (4 ft 8 1/2 in) standard gauge
- Driver dia.: 1,250 mm (49 1/4 in)
- Length
  - Over beams: 16,613 mm (54 ft 6 in)
- Axle load: 14.7 t (14.5 long tons; 16.2 short tons)
- Adhesive weight: 52.6 t (51.8 long tons; 58.0 short tons)
- Service weight: 52.6 t (51.8 long tons; 58.0 short tons)
- Water cap.: 12.0 m^{3} (2,600 imp gal; 3,200 US gal) / 16.5 m^{3} (3,600 imp gal; 4,400 US gal)
- Boiler pressure: 12.0 bar (1.20 MPa; 12.2 kgf/cm^{2}; 174 psi)
- Heating surface
  - Firebox: 2.22 m^{2} (23.9 sq ft)
  - Evaporative: 151.21 m^{2} (1,627.6 sq ft)
- Cylinders: 2
- Cylinder size: 520 mm (20 1/2 in)
- Piston stroke: 630 mm (24 13/16 in)
Performance figures
- Maximum speed: 45 km/h (28 mph)
- Indicated power: 485 kW (659 PS; 650 hp)
Career
- Numbers: KPEV: 4401–4600 (from 1905); DRG: 55 001–660, 661–674, 681–683
- Retired: 1966

The Prussian Class G 7.1 engines of the Prussian state railways were German 0-8-0 steam locomotives design for hauling goods trains.

== History ==
They were first built in 1893 by the firm of Stettiner Maschinenbau AG Vulcan, but later by the other larger Prussian locomotive manufacturers as well. The boiler was the same as that of the G 5.1.

The locomotives were intended for heavy goods duties, especially on hilly routes. As a result, most of the engines went to the western German and Silesian railway divisions. By 1909, 1,002 examples had been delivered to the Prussian state railways. During the First World War simple and robust locomotives were required for military use. As a result, in 1916/1917 a further 200 G 7.1s were built. From 1916, the k.u.k. Heeresbahn in Austria had 35 units of the Class G 7.1 which it named the Class 274. They were intended for use on the broad gauge Russian Railways. The Lübeck-Büchen Railway also bought three G 7.1s, which had been manufactured in 1898 by Schwartzkopff. Another seven engines went to the Gutehoffnungshütte. Even the Palatinate Railway placed 27 of its G 4' in service; the design of these was based on the Prussian G 7.1.

In 1923 the Deutsche Reichsbahn took over no less than 680 from the Prussian state railways into its renumbering plan; in 1925 they listed locomotive numbers 55 001–660. In 1935, 14 more came from the Saar railways Reichsbahn fleet as 55 661 to 55 674; this included one locomotive that the Saar Railways had acquired from Alsace-Lorraine for border services. The three G 7.1s with the Lübeck-Büchen Railway were given numbers 55 681–683 in 1938.

In the Second World War 105 G 7.1s were taken over from Poland into the Reichsbahn's inventory. They were given the numbers of engines already retired. In addition, G 7.1 engines from Lithuania were added as numbers 55 274 and 55 691-694.

After the Second World War, the locomotives that ended up in the Deutsche Bundesbahn were mainly used in shunting duties and were retired by 1957. In the Deutsche Reichsbahn in East Germany the last G 7.1 was not retired until 1966, including number 55 642.

== Preserved locomotives ==
Locomotive 55 669 was retired in 1964 and has been displayed since in the Dresden Transport Museum in Dresden. Photograph of the 55 669

Locomotives 55 196, 393, 400, 493 and 553 were left in Austrian territory after the Second World War. Apart from 55 553, which had been taken over by 1950, the ÖBB incorporated them into their ÖBB Class 655, retaining their serial numbers. The last one, 655.393, was withdrawn in 1957. Its task had been shunting at Stadlau station.

The vehicles were equipped with tenders of classes pr 3 T 12 and pr 3 T 16.5 (built 1916/17).

== See also ==
- Prussian state railways
- List of Prussian locomotives and railcars
