= Bavarian Pt 2/4 H =

Bavarian Pt 2/4 H DRG Class 71.2
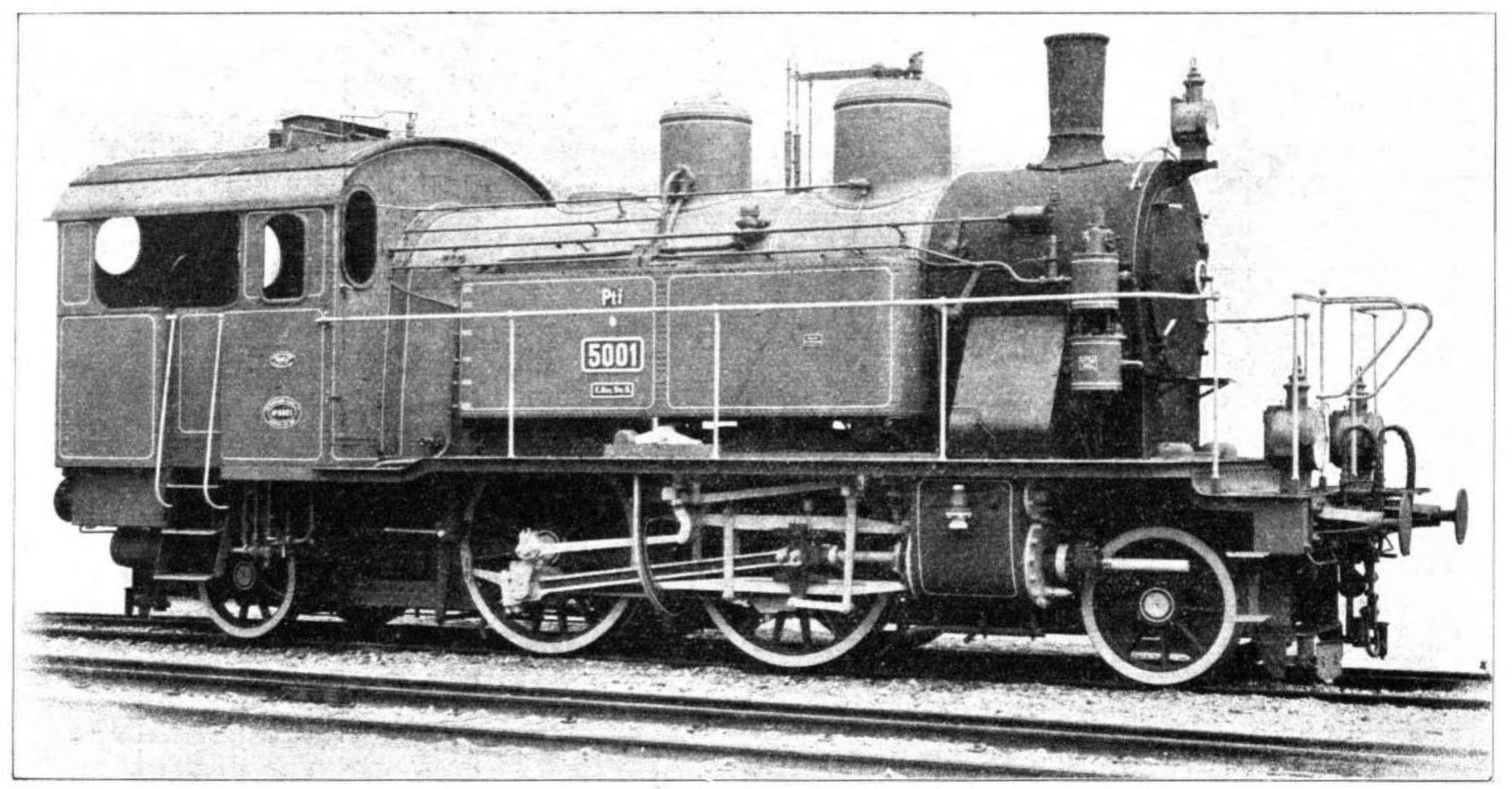
Type and origin
- Builder: Krauss
- Build date: 1906–1908
- Total produced: 12
Specifications
- Configuration
  - Whyte: 2-4-2T
- Gauge: 1,435 mm (4 ft 8 1/2 in)
- Leading dia.: 1,006 mm (3 ft 3 5/8 in)
- Driver dia.: 1,546 mm (5 ft 7/8 in)
- Trailing dia.: 1,006 mm (3 ft 3 5/8 in)
- Length
  - Over beams: 10,700 mm (35 ft 1 1/4 in)
- Axle load: 16.0 t (15.7 long tons; 17.6 short tons)
- Adhesive weight: 31.7 t (31.2 long tons; 34.9 short tons)
- Service weight: 60.0 t (59.1 long tons; 66.1 short tons)
- Boiler pressure: 12 kgf/cm^{2} (1,180 kPa; 171 lbf/in^{2})
- Heating surface
  - Firebox: 1.23 m^{2} (13.2 sq ft)
  - Evaporative: 67.90 m^{2} (730.9 sq ft)
- Superheater
  - Heating area: 19.60 m^{2} (211.0 sq ft)
- Cylinders: 2
- Cylinder size: 490 mm (19 5/16 in)
- Piston stroke: 540 mm (21 1/4 in)
Performance figures
- Maximum speed: 75 km/h (47 mph)
Career
- Numbers: K.Bay.Sts.E.: 5001–5012; DRG: 71 201–212
- Retired: 1948

The Pt 2/4 H was a class of steam locomotive built by the firm of Krauss for the Royal Bavarian State Railways (Königlich Bayerische Staatsbahn) between 1906 and 1908. They were used on routes in Bavaria to haul light, fast passenger trains.

The vehicles all had a gravity-fed firebox with a hopper over the grate for one-man operation. It was possible to access the train directly from the locomotive via doors in the front and rear walls and gangways. On several engines, the Reichsbahn later made modifications to the driver's cab.

The Deutsche Reichsbahn took all engines of this type over. The last Pt 2/4 H locomotive was retired in 1948.

== See also ==
- Royal Bavarian State Railways
- List of Bavarian locomotives and railbuses
