= Oldenburg T 5.1 =

Oldenburg T 5.1 DRG Class 71.4
Type and origin
- Builder: Hanomag
- Build date: 1907–1921
- Total produced: 20
Specifications
- Configuration
  - Whyte: 2-4-2T
- Gauge: 1,435 mm (4 ft 8 1/2 in)
- Leading dia.: 1,000 mm (3 ft 3 3/8 in)
- Driver dia.: 1,600 mm (5 ft 3 in)
- Trailing dia.: 1,000 mm (3 ft 3 3/8 in)
- Wheelbase
  - Overall: 6,800 mm (22 ft 3 3/4 in); 7,000 mm (22 ft 11 1/2 in)*
- Length
  - Over beams: 11,685 mm (38 ft 4 in)
- Axle load: 15.0 t (14.8 long tons; 16.5 short tons)
- Adhesive weight: 30.00 t (29.53 long tons; 33.07 short tons)
- Empty weight: 41.50 t (40.84 long tons; 45.75 short tons)
- Service weight: 53.10 t (52.26 long tons; 58.53 short tons)
- Boiler pressure: 12 kgf/cm^{2} (1.18 MPa; 171 lbf/in^{2})
- Heating surface
  - Firebox: 1.56 m^{2} (16.8 sq ft)
  - Evaporative: 100.68 m^{2} (1,083.7 sq ft)
- Cylinders: 2
- Cylinder size: 430 mm (16 15/16 in)
- Piston stroke: 600 mm (23 5/8 in)
Performance figures
- Maximum speed: 75 km/h (47 mph)
Career
- Numbers: GOE: 185–187, 207–208, 216–218, 226–228, 236, 256–258, 269–271, 279–280; DRG: 71 401 – 71 420
- Retired: 1930

The Oldenburg Class T 5.1 was a German steam locomotive built for the Grand Duchy of Oldenburg State Railways as a tank engine for passenger train duties. Its design was based on that of the Prussian T 5.1.

The firm of Hanomag manufactured 20 units of the Oldenburg T 5.1 between 1907 and 1921. Like its Prussian sisters it had the defect of poor riding qualities at high speeds. As a result, during the delivery of these engines design changes were made to the running gear, for example the overall wheelbase was increased. But even these measures met with no success.

The Deutsche Reichsbahn took over all 20 locomotives in 1925 as DRG Class 71.4 and gave them numbers 71 401 to 71 420. They were retired by 1930.

== See also ==
- Grand Duchy of Oldenburg State Railways
- List of Oldenburg locomotives and railbuses
- Länderbahnen
