= Union Giesserei Königsberg =

Union-Gießerei Lokomotivfabrik und Maschinenbauanstalt
- Type: AG
- Industry: Mechanical engineering, Locomotive manufacturing and shipbuilding
- Founded: 1 May 1828
- Defunct: 1931
- Headquarters: Königsberg

Union Giesserei (German: Union Gießerei) was a German engineering company based in Königsberg, East Prussia.

== History ==
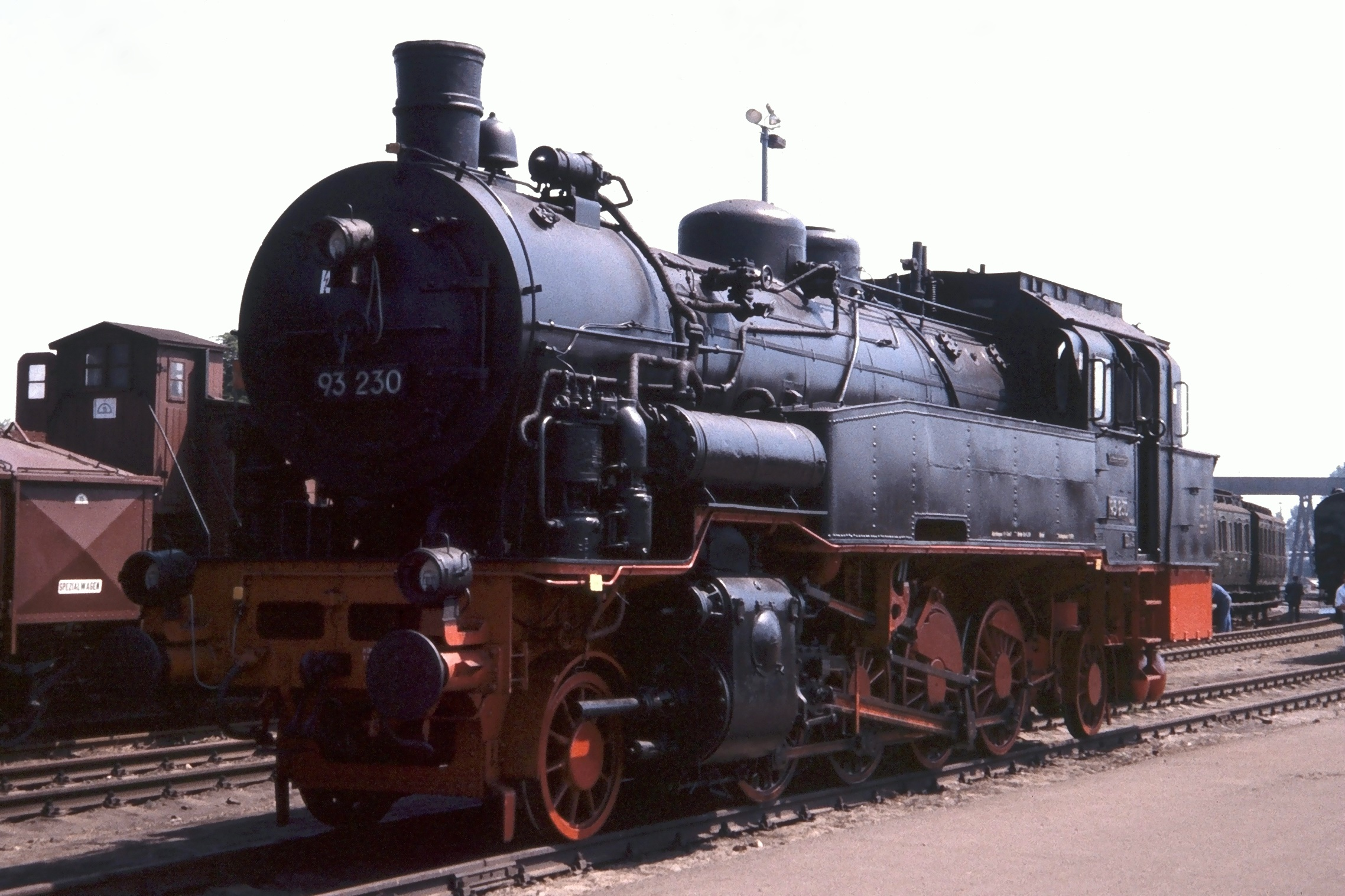
A Prussian T 14 built by Union in 1917 with factory number 2315

From a Königsberg merchant family, Maria Schnell married an English-born founder Charles Hughes, and in 1826 bought a silver refining business. Her brother Gustav Schnell, together with his brothers-in-law Friedrich Laubmeyer and Carl August Dultz, established an iron foundry, run by Hughes, on 1 May 1828, which was named Union Giesserei in 1845. In 1846 Union Giesserei employed an engineer, Johann Gottfried Dietrich Wilhelm Ostendorff (5 April 1812 - 23 September 1876), who had gained experience of locomotive and marine steam engines and boilers in Britain, and broadened the business in those directions. Ostendorff also married a daughter of Gustav Schell, and became the sole managing partner in 1852.

In 1855, Union Giesserei launched its first steamship Schnell on 5 June, and on 5 December delivered its first steam locomotive, built for the Prussian Eastern Railway. On Ostendorff's death in 1876, Elias Radok (16 November 1840 - 30 March 1910), who had previously worked for August Borsig in Berlin, took over the firm. It was changed from a public trading company to an Aktiengesellschaft (A.G.), or public limited company, on 2 June 1881. The board was now run by Radok and Ostendorff's son, Arthur (18 May 1850 - 24 July 1891). When Elias Radok died, the factory was taken over by senior engineers, Georg Panck and Paul Fischer, together with the master builder, Max Hartung. Paul Fischer left in 1920 due to illness, Georg Panck died in 1923 and Max Hartung took over the helm until the arrival of Dr. Paul Brehm in November 1925.

Union Giesserei did not get any contracts from the newly formed Deutsche Reichsbahn and negotiations with the Reichsbahn proved largely fruitless. This led to severe economic problems in the company during the mid-1920s. In 1927, however, Union Giesserei was finally given orders for the construction of the DRG Class 64 and 80 steam locomotives as part of the 'eastern regions aid' (Ostlandhilfe) scheme. The shipyard fared better as the German authorities had a strategic interest in maintaining shiprepairing capability in the East. However, in 1930 Union Giesserei was declared bankrupt, and from 17 March it became a subsidiary of the F. Schichau GmbH. The shipyard was fully integrated in the Schichau group in 1931, came under Soviet control in 1945 and later became the Russian-owned Yantar Shipyard.
