= List of Mecklenburg locomotives =

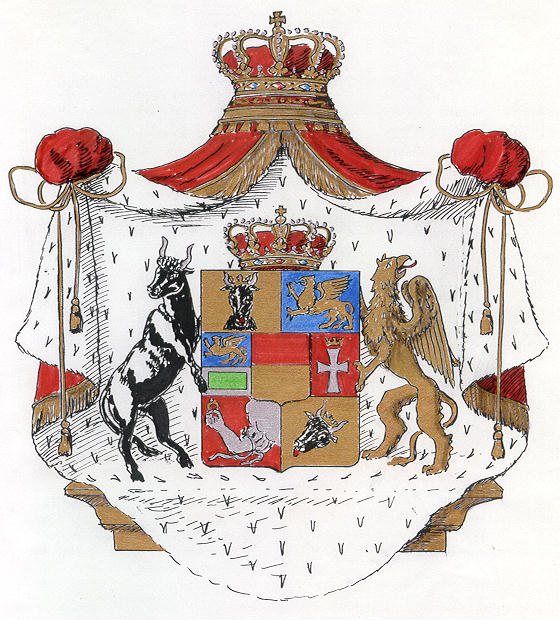
Coat of arms of the Grand Duchy of Mecklenburg

This list contains an overview of Mecklenburg locomotives built from 1848 to 1922, and is based on the classification scheme of the Grand Duchy of Mecklenburg Friedrich-Franz Railway (Großherzoglich Mecklenburg Friedrich-Franz-Eisenbahn).

== Context ==
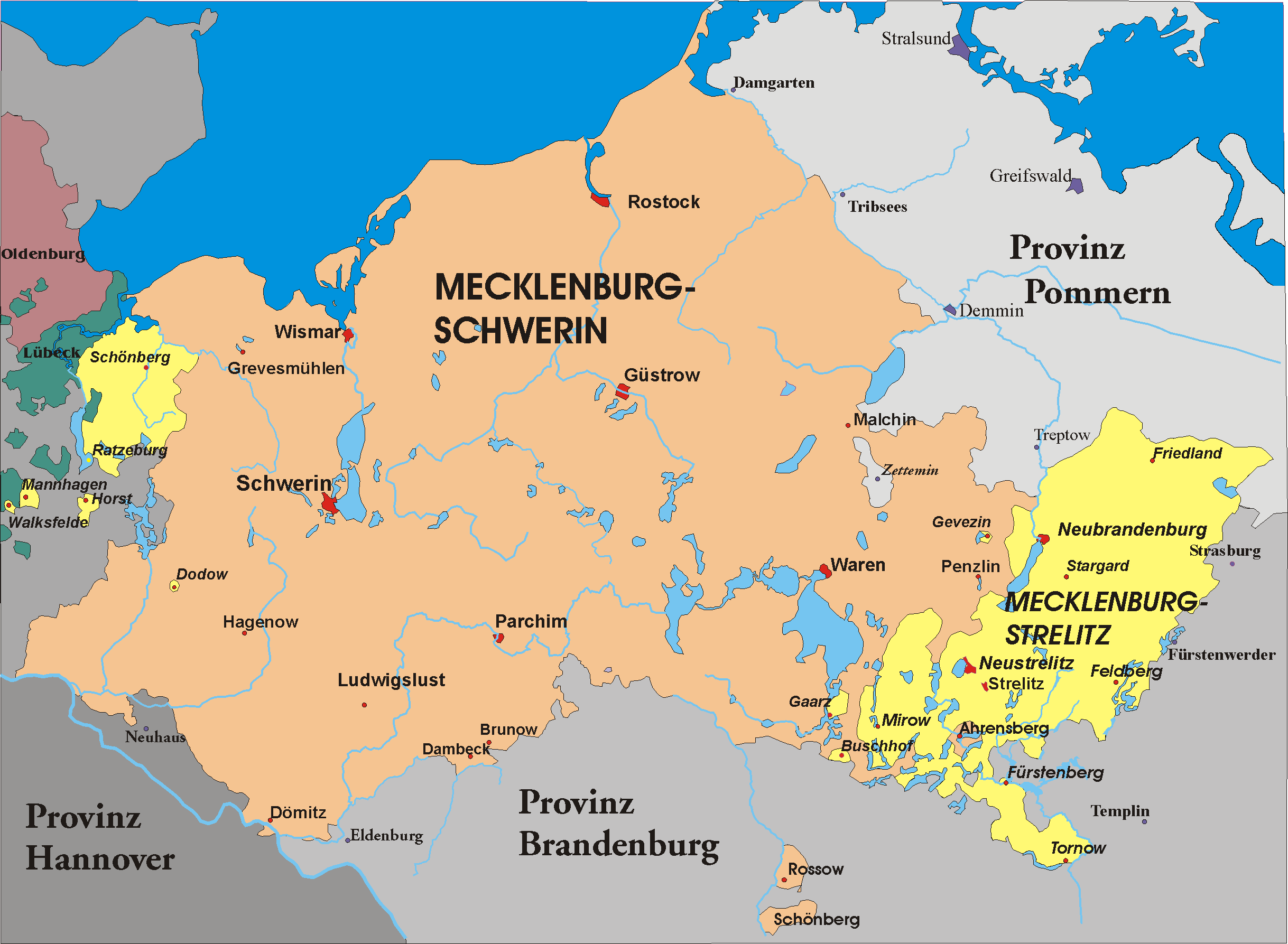
The former duchies of Meckenburg 1866–1934

Mecklenburg is a region in northern Germany comprising the western and larger part of the present day state of Mecklenburg-Vorpommern. Its largest cities are Rostock, Schwerin, and Neubrandenburg. In 1815, the two Mecklenburg duchies – Mecklenburg-Schwerin and Mecklenburg-Strelitz – were raised to Grand Duchies, and subsequently existed separately in Germany until the end of World War I. The earlier private railways were nationalised by 1890 into the Grand Duchy of Mecklenburg Friedrich-Franz Railway.

== Overview of the locomotives ==
Mecklenburg locomotives were given a name as well as a number at the outset, the names being mainly chosen from geographical features in Mecklenburg. This naming of locomotives ceased in 1895.

Originally, locomotive numbers followed the sequence in which they were produced. In 1890, on nationalisation, however, a new numbering scheme was introduced. Each class was allocated a specific range of numbers. The Grand Duchy of Mecklenburg Friedrich-Franz Railway divided the locomotives into the following different classes:

- I – VII: Passenger train locomotives
- VIII – X: Goods train locomotives
- XI – XVIII: Tank locomotives
- XIX: Narrow gauge locomotives
- XX: Goods train locomotives
- XXI: Tender locomotives

In 1910 a new scheme was introduced that broadly conformed to the Prussian system. This entailed allocating group letters as follows: the letter P to passenger train locomotives (Personenzuglokomotiven), G to goods train locomotives (Güterzuglokomotiven) and T to tank locomotives (Tenderlokomotiven). Individual classes were distinguished by an Arabic numeral after the letter. To specify the sub-class, superscripts were used. So, for example, locomotives with simple steam expansion were to be given a "1" and compound locomotives a "2".

== Steam locomotives ==
=== Early locomotives for mixed traffic ===
These locomotives were all built for the Mecklenburg Railway Company and went into the fleet of the Grand Duchy of Mecklenburg Friedrich-Franz Railway on nationalisation.

Class	Railway number(s)		DRG number(s)	Quantity	Year(s) of manufacture	Axle arrangement (UIC)	Remarks
Class	to 1895	From 1895	DRG number(s)	Quantity	Year(s) of manufacture	Axle arrangement (UIC)	Remarks
I	42, 45–46, 55–57	1, 3–5		6	1848–1863	1A1 n2	Collection of various 1A1 locomotive classes
II	43–44, 47–49	2, 6–7		5	1849–1851	1B n2	Rebuild from 1A1 locomotives
II	50–53	8		4	1851–1856	1B n2	
None	54	301		1	1859	1B n2	Goods train locomotive NICLOT
None	58–59	302–303		2	1866–1868	B1 n2	Goods train locomotives WODAN and THOR

=== Passenger train locomotives ===
Class		Railway number(s)		DRG number(s)	Quantity	Year(s) of manufacture	Axle arrangement (UIC)	Remarks
to 1910	from 1910	to 1895	from 1895	DRG number(s)	Quantity	Year(s) of manufacture	Axle arrangement (UIC)	Remarks
III		12–30			19	1864–1869	1B n2	
IV		31–41			11	1871–1879	1B n2	
V	P 2	60–65		(34 7201–7204)	6	1884–1885	1B n2	
V	P 2	99–105	66–72		7	1884–1887	1B n2	Acquired in 1894 with the Lloydbahn (Neustrelitz–Warnemünde)
VI	P 3^{1}	67–70, 73–77, 90–91, 97–98	101–118	34 7302–7308	18	1888–1894	1B n2	
VI	P 3^{1}	106–107	119–120	34 7301	2	1891	1B n2	Acquired in 1894 with the Lloydbahn (Neustrelitz–Warnemünde)
VI	P 3^{1}		121–141	34 7351–7364	21	1896–1907	1B n2	
	P 3^{2}	151–153		(34 7351–7353)	3	1888–1897	1B n2v	Transferred in 1920 from the Prussian state railway fleet
	P 4^{1}		181–186	(36 7201–7202)	6	1894–1896	2′B n2	Transferred in 1920 from the Prussian state railway fleet
VII	P 4^{2}		201–231	36 602–620, 36 651–662	31	1903–1912	2′B n2v	
VII	P 4^{2}		232	36 601	1	1900	2′B n2v	From Prussia to Mecklenburg in 1920
	P 8		251–266	38 1573–1575, 38 1750–1751, 38 1791–1792, 38 2023, 2026, 2119, 38 3674–3676	16	1914–1912	2′C h2	

=== Goods train locomotives ===
Class		Railway number(s)		DRG number(s)	Quantity	Year(s) of manufacture	Axle arrangement (UIC)	Remarks
to 1910	from 1910	to 1895	From 1895	DRG number(s)	Quantity	Year(s) of manufacture	Axle arrangement (UIC)	Remarks
VIII	G 2	1–11	315–325		11	1864–1869	C n2	Rebuilt in 1892–1897 with replacement boiler and new drive; nos. 322–325 were numbered 310–313 before the rebuild
VIII	G 2	66	314		1	1885	C n2	
IX	G 3	78, 85–86, 96	350–353	(53 7702–7704)	4	1892–1894	C n2	
IX	G 3		354–355	(53 7701)	2	1887	C n2	Acquired in 1894 with the Lloydbahn (Neustrelitz–Warnemünde)
IX	G 3		356–357	(53 7705)	2	1895	C n2	
X	G 4^{2}		401–405	(53 401–405)	5	1901–1905	C n2v	
X	G 4^{2}		406		1	1897	C n2v	Transferred in 1920 from the Prussian state railway fleet
	G 5^{2}		440–444	54 371–372, 54 379–381	5	1904–1907	1′C n2v	Formerly with the Imperial Railways in Alsace-Lorraine, transferred in 1920 from the Prussian state railway fleet
XX	G 5^{4}		451–459	54 1201–1203	9	1906–1913	1′C n2v	
	G 7^{2}		466–476	55 5701–5705	11	1914–1916	D n2v	476 renumbered to 472 in 1919
	G 7^{3}		474–478	56 201–205	5	1917	1′D n2v	Taken over by the Warsaw MGD after the First World War
	G 8^{1}		481–490	55 5801–5810	10	1918–1919	D h2	
	G 8^{1}		491–492	55 5851–5852	2	1917	D h2	From Prussia to Mecklenburg in 1920

=== Tank locomotives ===
Class		Railway number(s)		DRG number(s)	Quantity	Year(s) of manufacture	Axle arrangement (UIC)	Remarks
To 1910	From 1910	to 1895	from 1895	DRG number(s)	Quantity	Year(s) of manufacture	Axle arrangement (UIC)	Remarks
XI	T 1	110–113	501–504		4	1884	B n2t	Acquired in 1894 with the Lloydbahn (Neustrelitz–Warnemünde)
XII	T0	114–116	505–507		3	1882	B n2t	Acquired in 1890 with the Güstrow-Plaaz Railway
XIII	T2		508–509		2	1880	B n2t	Acquired in 1894 with the Parchim-Ludwigslust Railway
XIV	T2	117	510		1	1883	B n2t	Acquired in 1890 with the Güstrow-Plaaz Railway
XIV	T2	120–124	511–515		4	1881–1883	B n2t	Acquired in 1890 with the Wismar-Rostock Railway
XIV	T2		516–518		3	1884–1885	B n2t	Acquired in 1890 with the Teterow-Gnoien
XV	T 3a		530–531		2	1888	C n2t	Acquired in 1890 with the Güstrow-Plaaz Railway
XVI	T 3a		532–535		3	1887	C n2t	Acquired in 1897 with the Wismar-Karow Railway
XVII	T 3a	71–72, 79, 89, 92	550–554		5	1888–1893	C n2t	
XVII	T 3a		555–561, 563	89 8001–8002	8	1884–1892	C n2t	Acquired in 1894 with the Mecklenburg Southern Railway (Parchim–Neubrandenburg)
XVII	T 3a		562	89 8003	1	1892	C n2t	Acquired in 1894 with the Parchim-Ludwigslust Railway
XVII	T 3a	125–130	564–594	89 8004–8022, 89 8051–8052	31	1895–1900	C n2t	
XVII	T 3b		595–611	89 8053–8068	17	1901–1906	C n2t	595–596 with Walschaerts valve gear (Heusinger)
XXI	T 4		701–750	91 1901–1950	50	1907–1922	1′C n2t	
	T 9^{2}		772–774	91 002–003	3	1893	1′C n2t	Transferred in 1920 from the Prussian state railway fleet
	T 9^{3}		780–782	91 1012, 1164, 1205	3	1908–1909	1′C n2t	Transferred in 1920 from the Prussian state railway fleet

=== Narrow gauge locomotives ===
The Mecklenburg narrow gauge locomotives were built for a rail gauge of 900 mm (2 ft 11 7/16 in) and were procured for duties on the Bäderbahn Doberan-Heiligendamm–Arendsee.

Class		Railway number(s)	DRG number(s)	Quantity	Year(s) of manufacture	Axle arrangement (UIC)	Remarks
to 1910	from 1910	Railway number(s)	DRG number(s)	Quantity	Year(s) of manufacture	Axle arrangement (UIC)	Remarks
XVIII		1001–1002		2	1886–1887	B n2t	Acquired in 1890 with the Doberan-Heiligendamm Railway
XIX	T 7	1003–1004		2	1891–1898	C n2t	1911 Given away to the Neubukow sugar beet railway
	T 7	1005–1007	99 301–303	3	1910–1914	C n2t	
	(T 42)		99 311–313	3	1923–1924	D n2t	Delivered after nationalisation

== Locomotives of predecessors ==
Fleet number(s)	Name(s)	Later class	Quantity	Manufacturer	Year(s) of manufacture	Axle arrangement (UIC)	Notes
Mecklenburgische Eisenbahngesellschaft (acquired 1873)
1–3	ROSTOCK, WISMAR, GÜSTROW	–	3	Borsig	1847	1A1 n2	later rebuilt as tank locos, withdrawn 1871
4	MARSCHALL VORWÄRTS	I	1	Wöhlert	1848	1A1 n2	
5, 6, 13, 14	HAMBURG, SCHWERIN, MECKLENBURG, LUDWIGSLUST	–	4	Borsig	1848, 1850	1A1 n2	MECKLENBURG withdrawn 1878, others sold 1873
7, 8, 15	BERLIN, BÜTZOW, STRELITZ	II	3	Borsig	1848, 1850	1A1 n2; later rebuilt as 1B n2	different boilers (BÜTZOW, STRELITZ identical)
9, 10	SCHWAAN, NEBEL	I	2	Borsig	1850	1A1 n2	
11, 12	WARNOW, MAGDEBURG	II	2	Borsig	1850	1A1 n2; later rebuilt as 1B n2	different cylinders
16–19	HERCULES, 300, OBODRIT, SWANTEWIT	II	4	Borsig	1851, 1853	1B n2	
20	OSTSEE	–	1	Borsig	1854	1A1 n2	withdrawn 1872
21	RADEGAST	II	1	Borsig	1856	1B n2	
22	NICLOT	–	1	Borsig	1859	1B n2	
23, 24	HERTA, FREYA	I	2	Borsig	1860	1A1 n2	
25	HULDA	I	1	Egestorff	1863	1A1 n2	
26, 27	WODAN, THOR	–	2	Egestorff	1866, 1868	B1 n2	
Deutsch-Nordischer Lloyd (acquired 1894)
1–7		V	7	Hanomag, Henschel	1884, 1887	1B n2	
8, 9		VI	2	Henschel	1891	1B n2	
15, 16		IX	2	Henschel	1887	C n2	
21–24		XI	4	Egestorff	1884	B n2t	
Güstrow-Plauer Eisenbahn (acquired 1890)
1–3		XII	3	Vulcan	1882	B n2t	
4		XIV	1	Vulcan	1883	B n2t	
5, 6		XV	2	Vulcan	1888	C n2t	
Wismar-Rostocker Eisenbahn (acquired 1890)
1–4, 1a; later 11–15		XIV	5	Vulcan	1883, 1881	B n2t	15 formerly Altdamm–Colberger Eisenbahn 1a
Teterow-Gnoiener Eisenbahn (acquired 1890)
1–3; later 21–23		XIV	3	Vulcan	1884, 1885	B n2t	
Wismar-Karower Eisenbahn (acquired 1897)
1–4; later 31–34		XVI	4	Vulcan	1887	C n2t	
Parchim-Ludwigsluster Eisenbahn (acquired 1894)
–	FRIEDRICH FRANZ II, MOLTKE	XIII	2	Borsig	1880	B n2t	
–	VORWÄRTS	–	1	Sigl	1871	B n2t	New to Kaschau-Oderberger Bahn; to Parchim-Ludwigsluster Eisenbahn in 1880; withdrawn 1893
4	LUDWIGSLUST	XVII	1	Jung	1892	C n2t	
Mecklenburgische Südbahn (acquired 1894)
1–7	PARCHIM, LÜBZ, KAROW, MALCHOW, WAREN, PENZLIN, NEUBRANDENBURG	XVII	7	Borsig	1884	C n2t	
8	NEUSTADT	XVII	1	Jung	1892	C n2t	

== See also ==
- Länderbahnen
- Mecklenburg
- Grand Duchy of Mecklenburg Friedrich-Franz Railway
- UIC classification
