= Mecklenburg III =

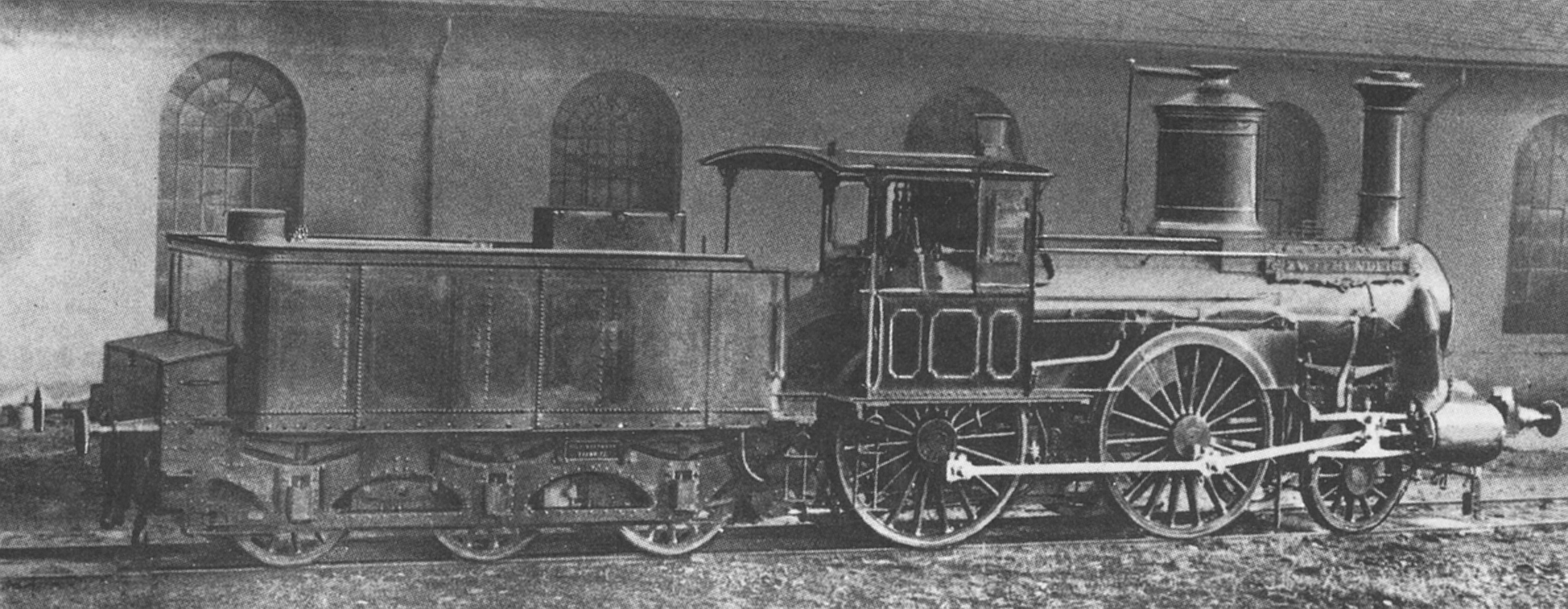
- MFFE No. 19 ZWEIHUNDERT (Sächsische Maschinenfabrik 200 of 1864)
Type and origin
- Builder: Sächsische Maschinenfabrik
- Build date: 1864 (8), 1866 (4), 1869 (7)
- Total produced: 19
Specifications
- Configuration
  - Whyte: 2-4-0
- Gauge: 1,435 mm (4 ft 8 1/2 in)
- Leading dia.: 1,065 mm (3 ft 6 in)
- Coupled dia.: 1,870 mm (6 ft 1 1/2 in)
- Wheelbase
  - Overall: 4,395 mm (14 ft 5 in)
  - incl. tender: 9,989 mm (32 ft 9 1/4 in)
- Length
  - Over beams: 13,750 mm (45 ft 1 1/4 in)
- Height: 4,125 mm (13 ft 6 3/8 in)
- Axle load: 11.40 t (11.22 long tons; 12.57 short tons)
- Adhesive weight: 22.80 t (22.44 long tons; 25.13 short tons)
- Empty weight: 31.30 t (30.81 long tons; 34.50 short tons)
- Service weight: 33.90 t (33.36 long tons; 37.37 short tons)
- Boiler
- No. of heating tubes: 188
- Heating tube length: 1864/66 batches: 3,111 mm (10 ft 2 1/2 in); 1869 batch: 3,311 mm (10 ft 10 1/4 in)
- Boiler pressure: 1864 batch: 7.5 kgf/cm^{2} (735 kPa; 107 lbf/in^{2}); 1866 batch: 8.2 kgf/cm^{2} (804 kPa; 117 lbf/in^{2}); 1869 batch:8.9 kgf/cm^{2} (873 kPa; 127 lbf/in^{2})
- Heating surface
  - Firebox: 1.25 m^{2} (13.5 sq ft)
  - Radiative: 7.78 m^{2} (83.7 sq ft)
  - Tubes: 1864/66 batches: 71.64 m^{2} (771.1 sq ft); 1869 batch: 77.62 m^{2} (835.5 sq ft)
  - Evaporative: 1864/66 batches: 79.42 m^{2} (854.9 sq ft); 1869 batch: 84.40 m^{2} (908.5 sq ft)
- Cylinders: Two
- Cylinder size: 407 mm (16 in)
- Piston stroke: 560 mm (22 1/16 in)
- Valve gear: Stephenson
- Loco brake: Schleifer compressed air brake
Performance figures
- Maximum speed: 90 km/h (56 mph)
Career
- Numbers: MFFE: 12–19, 20–23, 24–30
- Retired: 1901–1910

The Grand Duchy of Mecklenburg Friedrich-Franz Railway grouped early, 2-4-0, passenger train locomotives from the Friedrich-Franz Railway into its Class III.

== History ==
When the Güstrow-Neubrandenburg line went into service, it was essential that locomotives were procured that could cope with the inclines in Mecklenburg Switzerland without difficulty. The existing 2-2-2 locomotives of what later became classes I and II were not powerful enough.

To that end the Friedrich-Franz Railway bought 19 2-4-0 locomotives from Richard Hartmann in Chemnitz in 3 batches in the years 1864, 1866 and 1869. The locomotives were named after north German towns. Two engines were given the names ZWEIHUNDERT ("two hundred") and VIER HUNDERT ("four hundred") based on their factory numbers. The locomotives remained in service until after the turn of the 20th century and were retired between 1903 and 1911.

== Technical description ==
The locomotives had an inside forked frame. The boiler barrel had three shells. On the centre one there was a large steam dome, which was as tall as the short cylindrical smokestack. The steam dome was decorated with brass bands. The vertical boiler had a safety valve on top.

The twin-cylinder wet steam engine was on the outside. The steam chests and the Stephenson valve gear were on the inside. The cylinders, which were set horizontally, drove the first coupled axle.

The coupled axles had overhung springing using leaf springs. An equalising beam, level with the axle boxes, linked the two springs. On the final batch of 1869 the springs were located underneath the axle boxes of the coupled wheels. On the carrying axle the springs were above the frame.

The locomotives had a Schleifer compressed air brake. The sandboxes were in front of the first driving axle and sanded the wheels from in front.

The engines were equipped with tenders of class 3T 7.9.

== See also ==
- Grand Duchy of Mecklenburg Friedrich-Franz Railway
- List of Mecklenburg locomotives

== Sources ==
- Hans-Joachim Kirsche; Hermann Lohr; Georg Thielmann (1989), Lokomotiv-Archiv Mecklenburg/Oldenburg (in German), Berlin: transpress, ISBN 3-344-00326-7
