= Mecklenburg II =

Mecklenburg II
Numbering:	43, 44, 47–53; 1895: 2, 6–8		
Quantity:	5	1	3
Manufacturer:	Borsig		
Years of manufacture:	1849–1851	1851	1853+1856
Retired:	1894–1901	1896	1891+1893
Wheel arrangement:	2-4-0		
Axle arrangement:	1B n2		
Track gauge:	1,435 mm (4 ft 8 1/2 in)		
Length over buffers:	≈ 12,095 mm		
Height:	≈ 4,422 mm		
Overall wheelbase:	≈ 3,725 mm		
Unladen weight:	22.80 t	24.00 t	24.20 t
Service weight:	25.05 t	26.75 t	26.60 t
Adhesive weight:	15.60 t	21.95 t	21.20 t
Axle load:	7.80 t	10.98 t	10.60 t
Coupled wheel diameter:	1,535-1,600 mm		
Carrying wheel diameter:	1,015-1,045 mm		
Valve gear:	Stephenson		
No. of cylinders:	2		
Cylinder bore:	330 mm 356 mm	380 mm	381 mm
Piston stroke:	508 mm 559 mm	559 mm	559 mm
Boiler overpressure:	8.19 bar 7.31 bar	7.31 bar	5.85 bar
No. of heating tubes:	135-143	145	139
Heating tube length:	2,794–3,058 mm	4,077 mm	4,193 mm
Grate area:	1.07-1.15 m²	1,07 m²	0.99 m²
Radiative heating area:	5.15-5.93 m²	5.57 m²	5.16 m²
Heating tube area:	48.72-53.51 m²	80.58 m²	76.90 m²
Evaporative heating area:	53.87-58.87 m²	86.15 m²	82.06 m²
Brake:	Screw brake (Spindelbremse)		

The Grand Duchy of Mecklenburg Friedrich-Franz Railway grouped various 2-4-0 steam locomotives built between 1849 and 1856 into its Class II. These included five locomotives that had originally been delivered with a 2-2-2 wheel arrangement.

== History ==
Between 1849 and 1851 Borsig delivered five 2-2-2 locomotives to the Mecklenburg Railway Company. These differed, however, from the engines supplied at the same time which were later categorized as the Class I. Locomotives BERLIN, BÜTZOW, WARNOW, MAGDEBURG and STRELITZ were given operating numbers 7, 8, 11, 12 and 15. Soon after entering service it became apparent that, when hauling goods trains between Schwerin and Rostock, the locomotives were reaching the limit of their capability. With an adhesive weight of 12 t the locomotives were not suited for such duties. As a result, from 1851 Borsig supplied four 2-4-0 locomotives. Engines HERCULES, OBOTRIT, SWANTEWIT and RADEGAST were given numbers 16, 18, 19 and 21. On the nationalization of the railways in 1873, RADEGAST was renamed KIEL because there was already a Class VIII on the state-owned Frederick-Francis Railway with the former name. In 1895 BÜTZOW, WARNOW, STRELITZ and HERCULES were given numbers 2, 6, 7 and 8. The first loco to be retired was KIEL in 1891. The last was STRELITZ which remained on duty until 1903.

The five 2-2-2 locomotives were later converted to 2-4-0s.

The engines worked the lines between Schwerin and Rostock and Bützow and Güstrow.

== Design features ==
The locomotives had inside forked frames. The triple-shelled boiler had a steam dome on the centre shell. The vertical boiler had a raised firebox cover and a safety valve.

The two-cylinder wet steam engine was on the outside. The cylinders set horizontally and drive the coupling rod on the first axle. The steam chests were, like the Stephenson valve gear, on the inside.

The coupled axles were sprung underneath with leaf springs. Weight balancing was achieved using an equalising beam between the springs. The front carrying wheels had leaf springs above the axles.

The screw brake was located on the tender. The locomotives had a spacious driver's cab with side windows.

The locomotives were equipped with 2 T 4.45 and 3 T 7.90 class tenders.

== Literature ==
- Hans-Joachim Kirsche; Hermann Lohr; Georg Thielmann (1989), Lokomotiv-Archiv Mecklenburg/Oldenburg (in German), Berlin: transpress, ISBN 3-344-00326-7
