= Mecklenburg XIX =

Mecklenburg XIX Mecklenburg T7
Type and origin
- Builder: Krauss
- Build date: 1891, 1898
- Total produced: 2
Specifications
- Configuration
  - Whyte: 0-6-0T
- Gauge: 900 mm (2 ft 11 7/16 in)
- Coupled dia.: 700 mm (2 ft 3 1/2 in)
- Wheelbase
  - Overall: 1,800 mm (5 ft 10 3/4 in)
- Length
  - Over beams: 5,530 mm (18 ft 1 3/4 in)
- Height: 3,705 mm (12 ft 1 7/8 in)
- Axle load: 5.33 t (5.25 long tons; 5.88 short tons)
- Adhesive weight: 15.98 t (15.73 long tons; 17.61 short tons)
- Empty weight: 13.08 t (12.87 long tons; 14.42 short tons)
- Service weight: 15.98 t (15.73 long tons; 17.61 short tons)
- Fuel capacity: 750 kg (1,650 lb)
- Water cap.: 1.70 m^{3} (370 imp gal; 450 US gal)
- Boiler
- No. of heating tubes: 88
- Heating tube length: 2,200 mm (7 ft 2 1/2 in)
- Boiler pressure: 12 kgf/cm^{2} (1,180 kPa; 171 lbf/in^{2})
- Heating surface
  - Firebox: 0.43 m^{2} (4.6 sq ft)
  - Radiative: 2.17 m^{2} (23.4 sq ft)
  - Tubes: 26.76 m^{2} (288.0 sq ft)
  - Evaporative: 28.93 m^{2} (311.4 sq ft)
- Cylinders: 2
- Cylinder size: 260 mm (10 1/4 in)
- Piston stroke: 400 mm (15 3/4 in)
Performance figures
- Maximum speed: 31 km/h (19 mph)
Career
- Numbers: MFFE: 1003 and 1004
- Retired: 1923, 1924

The locomotives of Class XIX of the Grand Duchy of Mecklenburg Friedrich-Franz Railway were deployed on the Bad Doberan–Heiligendamm narrow-gauge. The triple-coupled engines were classified as T 7 locomotives in 1910. In 1911 they were transferred to the Neubukow Beet Railway.

== History ==
The Class XVIII locomotives were soon unable to cope with the increase in traffic. As a result, a triple-coupled engine was ordered from Krauss in Munich. The locomotive was given the number 1003 by the Mecklenburg State Railway and was incorporated into Class XIX. In 1898 another locomotive, number 1004, followed. In 1910 the line was extended as far as Arendsee. To handle the higher levels of traffic, three similar engines were ordered from Henschel. With the introduction into service of these locomotives, that were grouped into Class T 7, the two Krauss locomotives were given to the Neubukow Beet Railway. The engines were still listed in the first Deutsche Reichsbahn renumbering plan in 1923, but they were retired by 1924.

== Design features ==
The locomotives had an inside frame which was built as a water tank. The boiler comprised two shell rings. The steam dome with its safety valve sat on the forward shell ring. The smokebox was very short. The smokestack has a Kobel spark arrestor. Later a Prüsmann chimney was used.

The horizontally arranged two-cylinder, wet steam drive acted on the rearmost coupled axle. The Stephenson valve gear with crossed eccentric rods was also on the outside.

The two front coupled axles had leaf spring blocks at the height of the running plate. These were linked by equalising beams. The rear axle was sprung with a transverse leaf spring stack.

The hand brake acted on the two outside wheel sets from the outside. Later the locomotives were given Knorr air brakes. The sanding gear sat on the middle of the boiler and sanded the outer sets of wheels from the outside. To begin with the running gear was covered. The locomotives also had steam heating, a steam bell and a De Limon centralized lubricating system.
