= Mecklenburg T 3 =

Mecklenburg XVII Mecklenburg T 3 DRG Class 89.80
Type and origin
- Build date: 1884–1906
- Total produced: 68
Specifications
- Configuration
  - Whyte: 0-6-0T
- Coupled dia.: 950 mm (3 ft 1 3/8 in)
- Length
  - Over beams: 8,300 mm (27 ft 2 3/4 in)
- Adhesive weight: 30.0 t (29.5 long tons; 33.1 short tons)
- Service weight: 30.0 t (29.5 long tons; 33.1 short tons)
- Boiler pressure: 12 kgf/cm^{2} (1,180 kPa; 171 lbf/in^{2})
- Heating surface
  - Firebox: 1.35 m^{2} (14.5 sq ft)
  - Evaporative: 60.86 m^{2} (655.1 sq ft)
- Cylinders: Two
- Cylinder size: 350 mm (13 3/4 in)
- Piston stroke: 550 mm (21 5/8 in)
Performance figures
- Maximum speed: 45 km/h (28 mph)
Career
- Numbers: DRG 89 8001–8022; DRG 89 8051–8068

The Mecklenburg T 3 was a German, goods train, tank locomotive built for the Grand Duchy of Mecklenburg Friedrich-Franz Railway (Großherzoglich Mecklenburgische Friedrich-Franz-Eisenbahn) from 1884. Originally designated as the Class XVII it had an 0-6-0T wheel arrangement and was based on the Prussian T 3.

These engines were later taken over by the Deutsche Reichsbahn as DRG Class 89.80 and incorporated into their renumbering plan.

A total of 68 examples of this locomotive were produced by various manufacturers between 1884 and 1906. Of these, 51 (the so-called T 3a) corresponded to the older version of the Prussian T 3 with a regulator on top. The other 17 (the T 3b) conformed to the more powerful version with a steam dome. Two of the latter locomotives were given a Walschaerts valve gear instead of the usual Allan valve gear. They were employed primarily on branch line and shunting duties. The last locomotive was retired by the Deutsche Reichsbahn in East Germany in 1963.

== See also ==
- Grand Duchy of Mecklenburg Friedrich-Franz Railway
- List of Mecklenburg locomotives
- Länderbahnen
