= Mecklenburg XVIII =

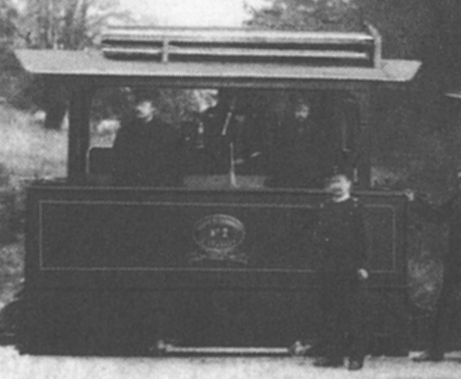
- No. 2 around 1890
Type and origin
- Builder: Hohenzollern AG Düsseldorf-Grafenberg
- Build date: 1886 + 1887
- Total produced: 2
Specifications
- Configuration
  - Whyte: 0-4-0T
  - UIC: B n2t
- Gauge: 900 mm (2 ft 11 7/16 in)
- Coupled dia.: 800 mm (2 ft 7 1/2 in)
- Wheelbase
  - Overall: 1,250 mm (4 ft 1 1/4 in)
- Length
  - Over couplers: 4,000 mm (13 ft 1 1/2 in)
- Height: 2,950 mm (9 ft 8 in)
- Axle load: 4.25 t / 4.75 t
- Adhesive weight: 8.50 t / 9.50 t
- Empty weight: 7.50 t / 8.50 t
- Service weight: 8.50 t / 9.50 t
- Fuel capacity: 160 kg (350 lb) coal
- Water cap.: 0.75 m^{3} (160 imp gal; 200 US gal) / 0.69 m^{3} (150 imp gal; 180 US gal)
- Boiler
- No. of heating tubes: 78 / 37
- Heating tube length: 1,350 mm (4 ft 5 1/4 in)
- Boiler pressure: 12 kgf/cm^{2} (1,180 kPa; 171 lbf/in^{2})
- Heating surface
  - Firebox: 0.36 m^{2} (3.9 sq ft)
  - Radiative: 2.15 m^{2} (23.1 sq ft)
  - Tubes: 11.25 m^{2} (121.1 sq ft) / 13.28 m^{2} (142.9 sq ft)
  - Evaporative: 13.40 m^{2} (144.2 sq ft) / 15.43 m^{2} (166.1 sq ft)
- Cylinder size: 200 mm (7 7/8 in) / 220 mm (8 11/16 in)
- Piston stroke: 350 mm (13 3/4 in)
- Valve gear: Joy
- Train brakes: Heberlein
Performance figures
- Maximum speed: 35 km/h (22 mph), later 31 km/h (19 mph)
Career
- Numbers: D.H.E. 1 and 2 M.F.F.E 1001 and 1002
- Retired: 1916

The Grand Duchy of Mecklenburg Friedrich-Franz Railway (Großherzoglich Mecklenburgische Friedrich-Franz-Eisenbahn) grouped two, narrow gauge, steam locomotives taken over from the Doberan-Heiligendamm railway (Doberan-Heiligendammer Eisenbahn or DHE) into the Mecklenburg XVIII engine class.

== History ==
For the opening of the 6.6 km (4.1 mi) long railway line from Doberan to Heiligendamm the DHE had procured two 'tramway' locomotives, which were given the numbers 1 and 2. The long section through the town in Doberan in particular made the procurement of such engines sensible. When the private railways were nationalised in 1890 the locomotives were renumbered to 1001 and 1002. Not long afterwards, it became clear that the locomotives were not able to cope with the rising levels of traffic as they could only haul a three-coach train. So in 1891 and 1898 Class XIX engines were procured. The tramway locos were retired in 1916.

== Design Details ==
The locomotives were designed as box frame engines (Kastenlokomotiven) and had an outside plate frame with a well tank. The two saturated steam engines were on the inside, and the diagonally-oriented cylinders drove the rear coupled axle. The entire running gear was covered. Suspension was provided by leaf springs over the axle boxes. The boiler was horizontal. The firehole was located on the right hand side. In order to keep the minimise the impact when driving through Doberan, exhaust steam was expelled through a condenser. The footplate was located on the right hand side and could be used for driving both forwards and backwards due to the good visibility it afforded. Reversing the Joy valve gear was achieved using a lever working a crossed eccentric rod.

== See also ==
- Grand Duchy of Mecklenburg Friedrich-Franz Railway
- List of Mecklenburg locomotives
- Länderbahnen

== Literature ==
- Kirsche, Hans-Joachim; Lohr, Hermann; Thielmann, Georg (1989). Lokomotiv-Archiv Mecklenburg/Oldenburg. Berlin: transpress. ISBN 3-344-00326-7.
