= Mecklenburg G 4.2 =

Early 20th century German goods engine

Mecklenburg X Mecklenburg G 4.2
Type and origin
- Builder: Henschel & Sohn (4); Linke-Hofmann (1)
- Build date: 1901–1905
- Total produced: 5
Specifications
- Configuration
  - Whyte: 0-6-0
- Driver dia.: 1,345 mm (4 ft 5 in)
- Length
  - Over beams: 15,367 mm (50 ft 5 in)
- Axle load: 13.45 t (13.24 long tons; 14.83 short tons)
- Adhesive weight: 40.35 t (39.71 long tons; 44.48 short tons)
- Service weight: 40.35 t (39.71 long tons; 44.48 short tons)
- Water cap.: 12.0 m^{3} (2,600 imp gal; 3,200 US gal)
- Boiler pressure: 12 kgf/cm^{2} (1,180 kPa; 171 lbf/in^{2})
- Heating surface
  - Firebox: 1.53 m^{2} (16.5 sq ft)
  - Evaporative: 116.00 m^{2} (1,248.6 sq ft)
- Cylinders: Two, compound
- High-pressure cylinder: 460 mm (18 1/8 in)
- Low-pressure cylinder: 650 mm (25 9/16 in)
- Piston stroke: 630 mm (24 13/16 in)
- Valve gear: Allan
Performance figures
- Maximum speed: 45 km/h (28 mph)
Career
- Numbers: MFFE 401–405; (DRG: 53 401 – 53 405)
- Retired: 1924

The Mecklenburg Class G 4.2 operated by the Grand Duchy of Mecklenburg Friedrich-Franz Railway was a goods train, steam locomotive with a compound engine. It was procured between 1901 and 1905 from Henschel and Linke based on the Prussian G 4.2 prototype. A total of five machines were built for Mecklenburg. It was planned that they would be taken over by the Deutsche Reichsbahn and were to have been given numbers 53 401 to 53 405 according to the 1923 provisional DRG renumbering plan. But they were retired by 1924 before the final plan was issued.

The vehicles were equipped with a Hartmann steam brake and had inside Allan valve gear. The engines were able to haul a 500 tonnes (490 long tons; 550 short tons) train on an incline of 1:300 at 30 km/h (19 mph).

In 1920 a G 4.2 was transferred from Prussia to Mecklenburg. It was given running no. 406 and would have become DRG 53 451.

== See also ==
- Grand Duchy of Mecklenburg Friedrich-Franz Railway
- List of Mecklenburg locomotives
