= Mecklenburg G 3 =

Early German steam locomotive

Mecklenburg IX Mecklenburg G 3
Type and origin
- Build date: 1887–1895
- Total produced: 8
Specifications
- Configuration
  - Whyte: 0-6-0
- Gauge: 1,435 mm (4 ft 8 1/2 in)
- Driver dia.: 1,350 mm (4 ft 5 1/8 in)
- Length
  - Over beams: 15,176 mm (49 ft 9 1/2 in)
- Axle load: 13.31 t (13.10 long tons; 14.67 short tons)
- Adhesive weight: 39.94 t (39.31 long tons; 44.03 short tons)
- Service weight: 39.94 t (39.31 long tons; 44.03 short tons)
- Boiler pressure: 10 kgf/cm^{2} (981 kPa; 142 lbf/in^{2})
- Heating surface
  - Firebox: 1.53 m^{2} (16.5 sq ft)
  - Evaporative: 124.8 m^{2} (1,343 sq ft)
- Cylinders: Two
- Cylinder size: 450 mm (17 11/16 in)
- Piston stroke: 630 mm (24 13/16 in)
Performance figures
- Maximum speed: 45 km/h (28 mph)
Career
- Numbers: MFFE: 350–357; (DRG: 53 7701–7705)

The Mecklenburg Class G 3 was an early German steam locomotive operated by the Grand Duchy of Mecklenburg Friedrich-Franz Railway. Formerly the Class IX it was a copy of the Prussian G 3.

== Description ==
In total, there were eight G 3 locomotives in the Mecklenburg fleet, which all built between 1887 and 1895. Of these two originally came from the Lloyd Railway, Neustrelitz - Warnemünde. The engines had a steam brake and an outside valve gear of the Allan type. Five engines were intended for transfer to the Deutsche Reichsbahn, to be numbered 53 7201 to 53 7205; however they were withdrawn before the renumbering plan was implemented.

The locomotives were given Class 3 T 10.5 tenders.

== See also ==
- Grand Duchy of Mecklenburg Friedrich-Franz Railway
- List of Mecklenburg locomotives
