= Mecklenburg P 3.1 =

Mecklenburg VI Mecklenburg P 3.1 DRG Class 34.73
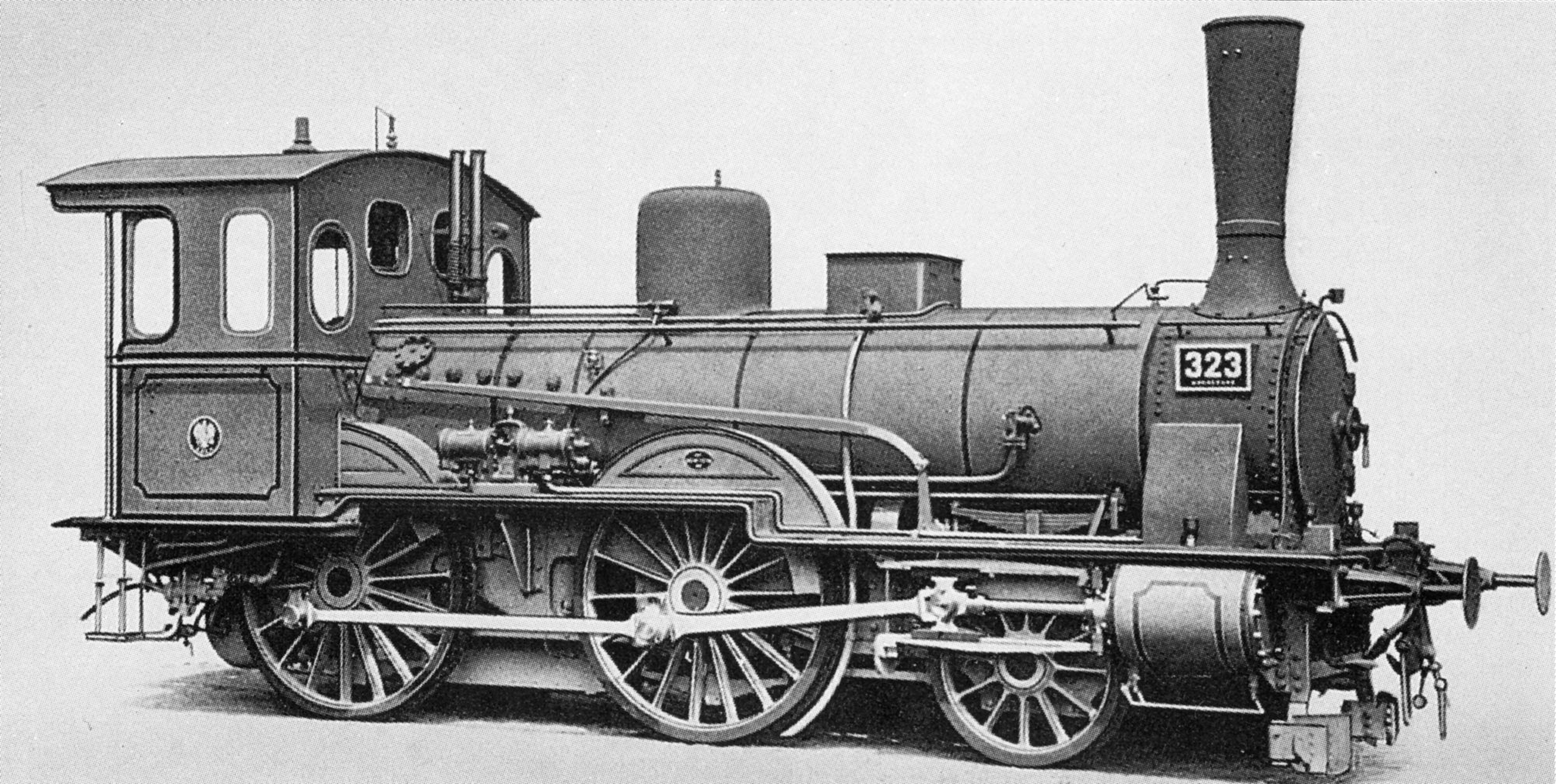
- Prussian P 3.1 No. 323 of the Magdeburg Division
Type and origin
- Builder: Henschel & Sohn; Linke-Hofmann Werke
- Build date: 1888–1907
- Total produced: 41
Specifications
- Configuration
  - Whyte: 2-4-0
- Gauge: 1,435 mm (4 ft 8 1/2 in)
- Leading dia.: 1,150 mm (3 ft 9 1/4 in)
- Driver dia.: 1,750 mm (5 ft 9 in)
- Length
  - Over beams: 14,793 mm (48 ft 6 1/2 in)
- Axle load: 12.35 tonnes (12.15 long tons; 13.61 short tons)
- Adhesive weight: 24.70 tonnes (24.31 long tons; 27.23 short tons)
- Service weight: 36.52 tonnes (35.94 long tons; 40.26 short tons)
- Boiler pressure: 12 kgf/cm^{2} (1,180 kPa; 171 lbf/in^{2})
- Heating surface
  - Firebox: 1.87 m^{2} (20.1 sq ft)
  - Evaporative: 96.43 m^{2} (1,038.0 sq ft)
- Cylinder size: 400 mm (15 3/4 in)
- Piston stroke: 560 mm (22 1/16 in)
Performance figures
- Maximum speed: 90 km/h (56 mph)
Career
- Numbers: MFFE: 101–141; DRG: 34 7301 – 34 7308, 34 7351 – 34 7364

The steam locomotives of DRG Class 34.73, formerly the Mecklenburg Class P 3.1 were passenger train locomotives operated by the Grand Duchy of Mecklenburg Friedrich-Franz Railway and were based on the Prussian P 3.1. They were sometimes used in express train services to begin with. Of the 41 examples belonging to this administration, which were built between 1888 and 1908, two originally came from the Lloyd Railway (Neustrelitz-Warnemünde). One improvement over the Mecklenburg P 2 was the braked coupled axle.

Twenty two of these locomotives were taken over by the Deutsche Reichsbahn, where they were given the running numbers 34 7301–34 7308 and 34 7351–34 7364. These engines were exclusively vehicles from the Friedrich-Franz Railway.

The engines were equipped with Prussian tenders of Class pr 3 T 10.5.

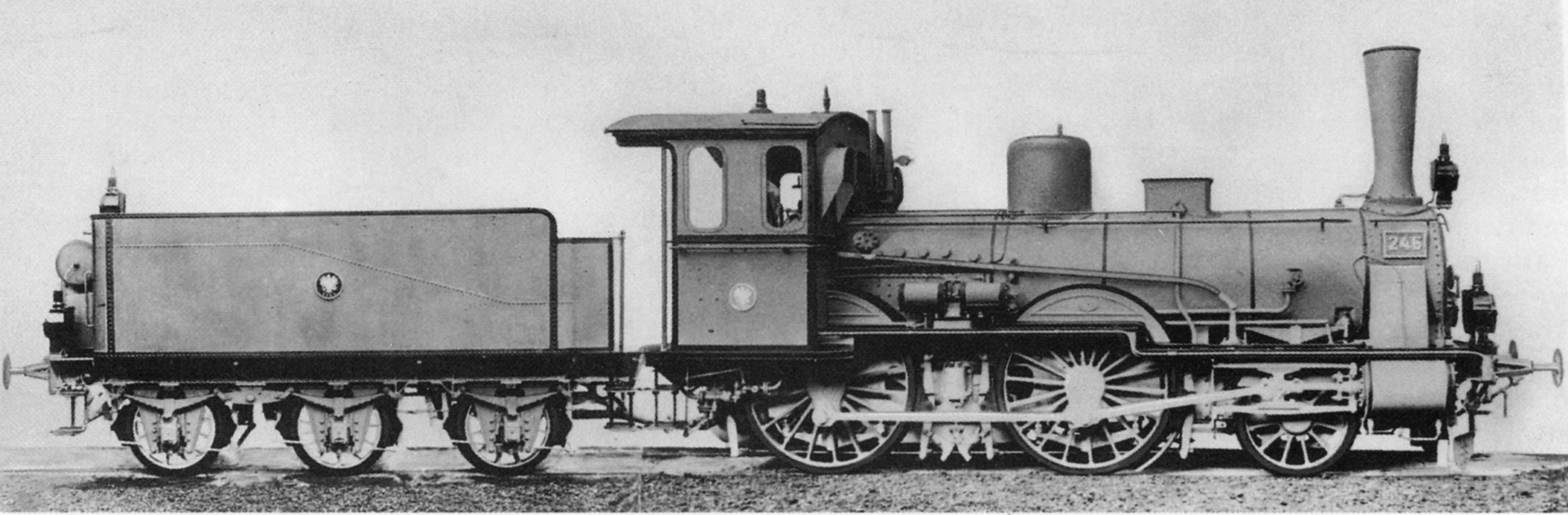
Liesel 22-10-2010 pr. P 3.1 2No. 246

== See also ==
- Grand Duchy of Mecklenburg Friedrich-Franz Railway
- List of Mecklenburg locomotives
