= Mecklenburg T 4 =

Mecklenburg T 4 DRG Class 91.19
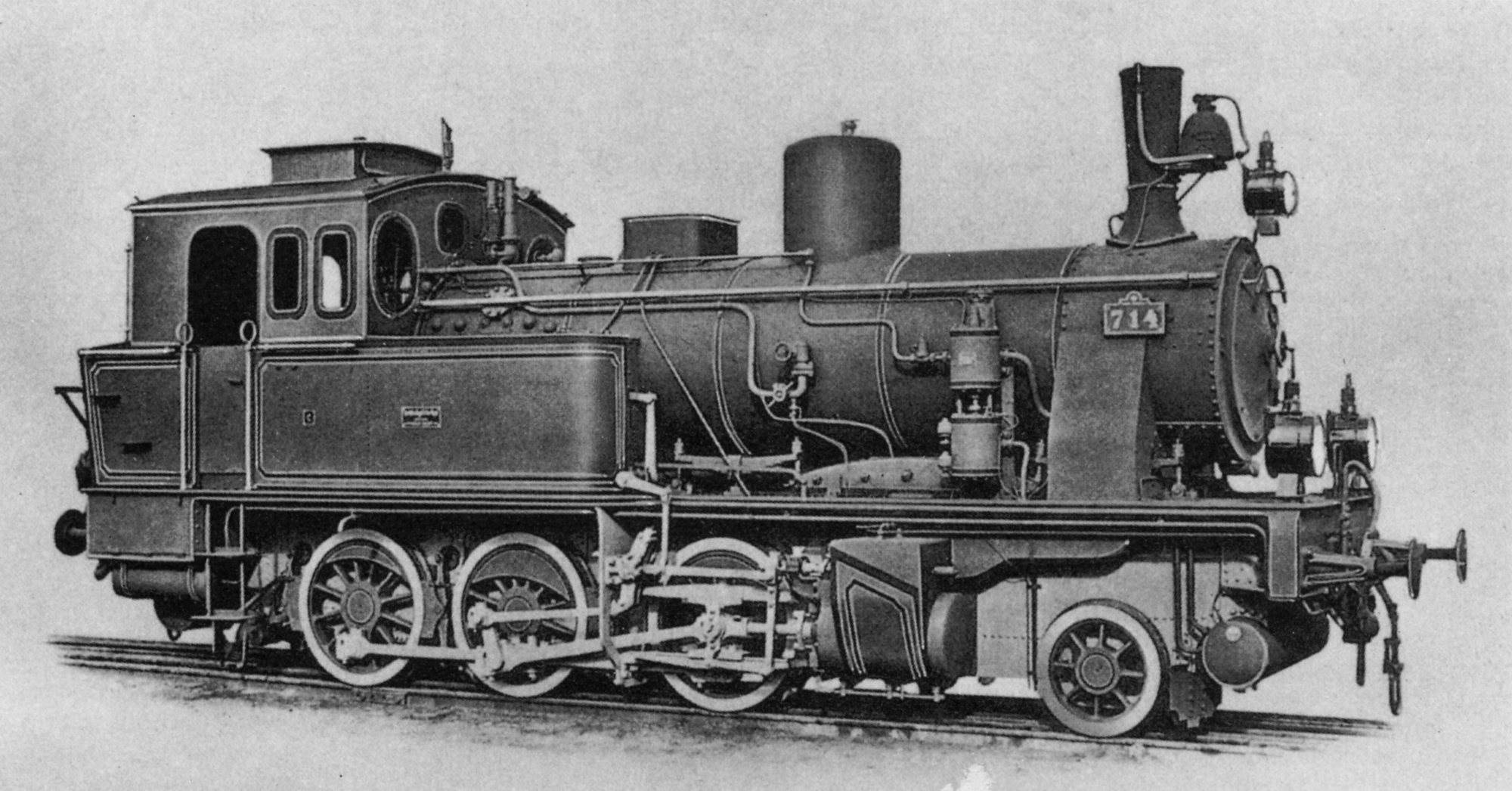
- MFFE 714 in a works photograph.
Type and origin
- Builder: Henschel & Sohn; Orenstein & Koppel
- Build date: 1907–1922
- Total produced: 50+6
Specifications
- Configuration
  - Whyte: 2-6-0T
  - German: Gt 34.11, Gt 34.12
- Gauge: 1,435 mm (4 ft 8 1/2 in)
- Leading dia.: 800 mm (2 ft 7 1/2 in)
- Coupled dia.: 1,150 or 1,200 mm (3 ft 9 1/4 in or 3 ft 11 1/4 in)
- Length
  - Over beams: 10,375 mm (34 ft 1/2 in)
- Height: 4,150 mm (13 ft 7 3/8 in)
- Axle load: 11.8–12.2 t (11.6–12.0 long tons; 13.0–13.4 short tons)
- Adhesive weight: 35.6–36.6 t (35.0–36.0 long tons; 39.2–40.3 short tons)
- Empty weight: 35.68–37.40 t (35.12–36.81 long tons; 39.33–41.23 short tons)
- Service weight: 45.24–46.8 t (44.53–46.06 long tons; 49.87–51.59 short tons)
- Fuel capacity: 1,500 kg (3,300 lb) coal
- Water cap.: 4.3–5.6 m^{3} (950–1,230 imp gal; 1,100–1,500 US gal)
- Boiler
- No. of heating tubes: 173
- Heating tube length: 3,700 mm (12 ft 1 3/4 in)
- Boiler pressure: 12 kgf/cm^{2} (1,180 kPa; 171 lbf/in^{2})
- Heating surface
  - Firebox: 1.60 m^{2} (17.2 sq ft)
  - Radiative: 7.41 m^{2} (79.8 sq ft)
  - Tubes: 92.5 m^{2} (996 sq ft)
  - Evaporative: 99.90 m^{2} (1,075.3 sq ft)
- Cylinders: Two
- Cylinder size: 410 mm (16 1/8 in)
- Piston stroke: 580 mm (22 13/16 in)
- Valve gear: Walschaerts (Heusinger)
Performance figures
- Maximum speed: 45–50 km/h (28–31 mph)
- Indicated power: 470 PS (346 kW; 464 hp)
Career
- Numbers: MFFE: 701–750; DRG 91 1901–1950; DR 91 6401–6404
- Retired: 1935–1970

The Mecklenburg T 4 was a German steam locomotive built for the Grand Duchy of Mecklenburg Friedrich-Franz Railway as a goods train 2-6-0T with a leading axle and three coupled axles. In 1925 it was incorporated in the renumbering plan of the Deutsche Reichsbahn as DRG Class 91.19.

At the beginning of the 20th century much more powerful locomotives were needed for branch line operations, but the tried and trusted Prussian engines could not be used because the T 9 family was already clearly too heavy. As a result, Henschel-Werke was given an order for what became the Mecklenburg T 4, one of the few locomotive classes to be developed by Mecklenburg itself. Contrary to what is often stated in the literature, these engines had a Krauss-Helmholtz bogie (just like the Prussian T 9.3). The Reichsbahn took over all 50 vehicles. Because the Mecklenburg routes were reinforced, the first locomotives became superfluous as early as the 1930s. Of the 38 locomotives left after the Second World War, two were taken over by the PKP in Poland, four came into the hands of the Deutsche Bundesbahn (DB), 15 had to be given up as reparations and two were retired as a result of serious damage, leaving just 13 with the Deutsche Reichsbahn (DR) in East Germany, of which two in the early 1950s ran in Saxony (for example between Niederschlema and Schneeberg, because damage by the uranium mines meant that only very light vehicles could be employed; eventually even that was no longer possible). The DB retired its locomotives by 1950 due to their low numbers, but continued to use them for a long time as industrial locos in repair shops. In 1949, the DR took over four of the six locomotives built in 1919/1920 for private lines by Henschel and gave them the numbers 91 6401–6404. The last of these engines were withdrawn from service in 1970.

== See also ==
- Grand Duchy of Mecklenburg Friedrich-Franz Railway
- List of Mecklenburg locomotives
