= Molli railway =

Railway line in Germany

Bad Doberan–Ostseebad Kühlungsborn West
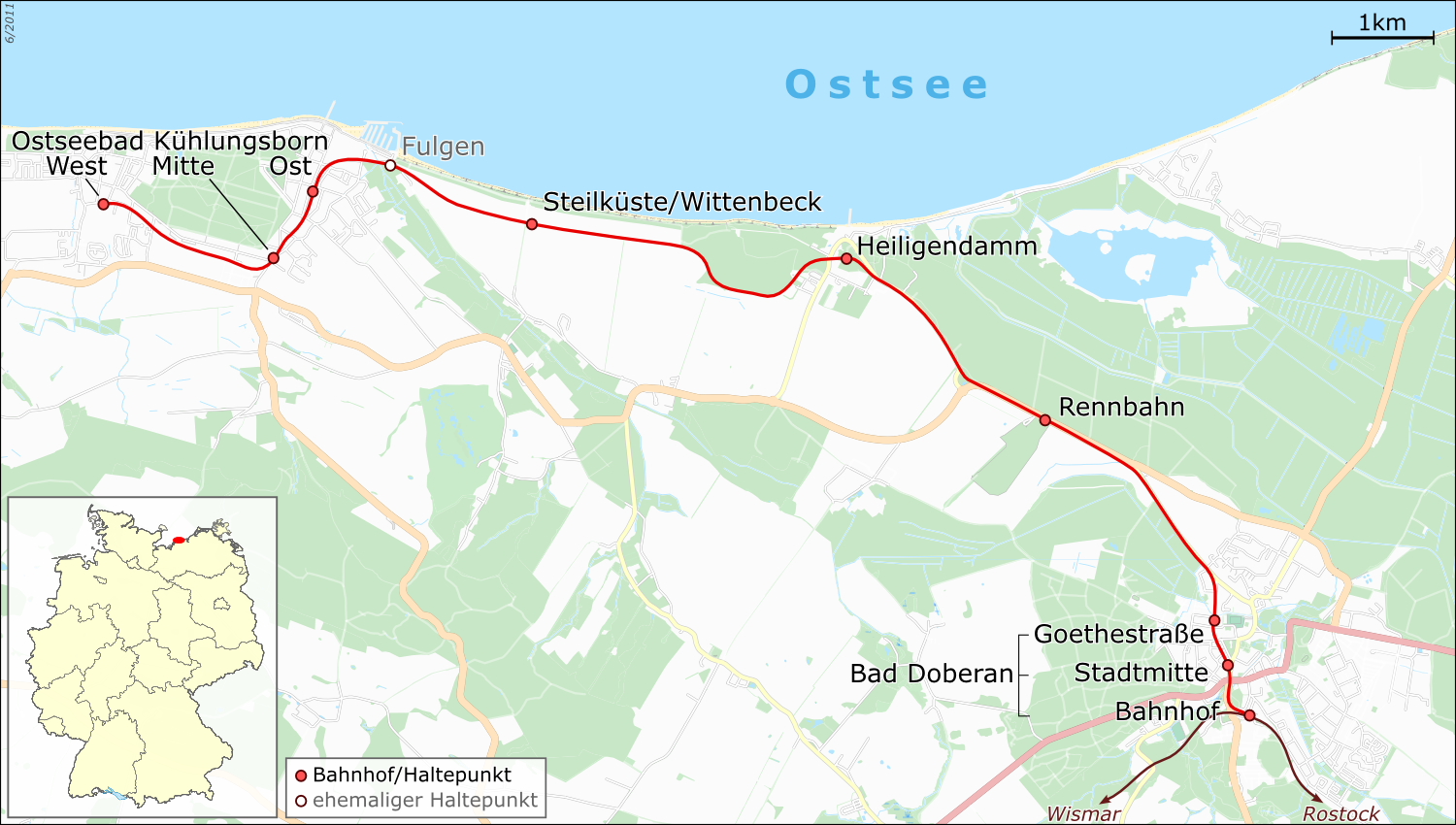

Overview
- Line number: 6996

Service
- Route number: 186

Technical
- Line length: 15.4 km (9.6 mi)
- Track gauge: 900 mm (2 ft 11 7/16 in)
- Operating speed: 40 km/h (25 mph) max.

The Molli (German: Mecklenburgische Bäderbahn "Molli"; short: MBB; also: Molli Bahn or Mollibahn) is a narrow-gauge steam-powered railway in Mecklenburg, Germany, running on 900 mm (2 ft 11 7/16 in) gauge track. It operates between Bad Doberan, Heiligendamm and Kühlungsborn West over a total distance of 15.4 km (9.6 mi) with a running time of 40 minutes. Within Bad Doberan the line runs through the street, and later along a linden tree-lined avenue.

== History ==
On 19 June 1886, Frederick Francis III, Grand Duke of Mecklenburg granted a licence for the construction and operation of a narrow gauge railway from Doberan station to Heiligendamm, this first section going into operation on 9 July 1886. It was built by the private railway construction and operating company of Lenz & Co. from Stettin (now Szczecin) and run by the Doberan-Heiligendamm Railway (DHE). Services on the 6.61-kilometre (4.11 mi)-long route, which was worked by a steam tram and later classified as a light railway or Kleinbahn, initially only ran during the summer season from 1 May to 30 September. On 13 March 1890, the Grand Duchy of Mecklenburg-Schwerin nationalized the line and incorporated it into the Grand Duchy of Mecklenburg Friedrich-Franz Railway.

On 18 December 1908, it was decided to extend the line as far as the Baltic seaside resort of Arendsee, which was merged in 1938 with the neighbouring communities of Brunshaupten and Fulgen to form the Baltic Sea resort of Kühlungsborn (Ostseebad Kühlungsborn). This extension was opened on 12 May 1910, at the same time the Heiligendamm station was moved about 200 metres further south. In the same year, goods services were started; and trains now ran all year round. From 1 April 1920, it became part of the Deutsche Reichsbahn.

The transhipment of goods from the Wismar–Rostock standard gauge line to the narrow gauge railway proved to be costly and unprofitable. The carriage of standard gauge wagons on narrow gauge transporter wagons as was common, for example, on the Saxon narrow gauge railways, was ruled out from the outset because of the narrow urban section through Bad Doberan. Thus, on 31 May 1969, goods services were withdrawn.

The route was worked daily by 13 pairs of trains. In 1976, the then district of Rostock added the train to the district's list of heritage monuments. On 1 October 1995, an operating company, consisting of Bad Doberan district and the towns of Kühlungsborn and Bad Doberan, took over the line from the Deutsche Bahn. Today the public-private company, operating under the name of Mecklenburgische Bäderbahn Molli (Mecklenburg Seaside Resort Railway Molli) is based in Bad Doberan. This railway company is not to be confused with the Mecklenburgische Bäderbahn AG, which opened the Rövershagen Kleinbf - Graal-Müritz line on 1 July 1925, running it until 1949 when East Germany's Deutsche Reichsbahn took over the enterprise. The terminus of Kühlungsborn West is home to the Molli Museum and the depot.

On 27 February 1997, the Mecklenburgische Bäderbahn Molli, together with the transport companies of Rostocker Straßenbahn, DB Regio AG Nordost, Regionalverkehr Küste, Weiße Flotte and antaris founded the Warnow Transport Association (Verkehrsverbund Warnow). Since then, the Molli Railway accepts weekly and monthly passes from the association's range of services. Tickets from the Deutsche Bahn pricing system, including the state tickets and the Schönes-Wochenende-Ticket ("Happy Weekend Ticket"), are however not recognized since the change of operator.

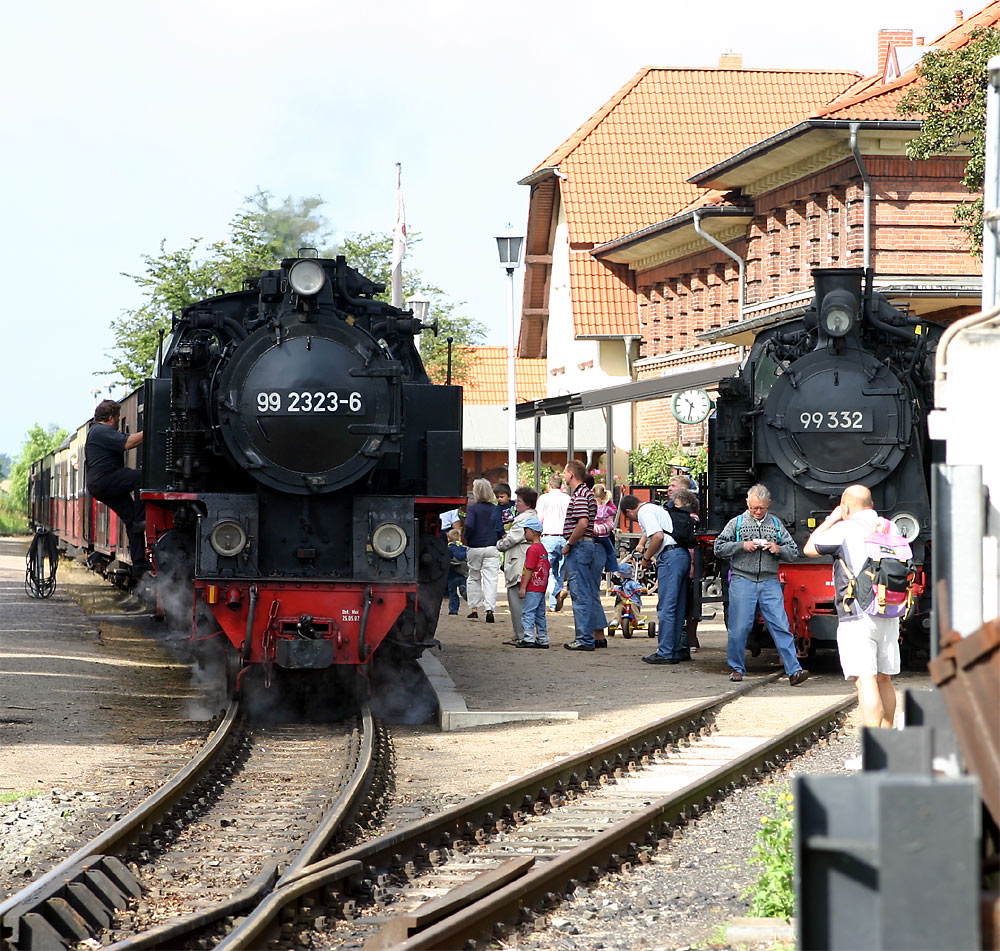
Two Molli locomotives in the terminus at Kühlungsborn West

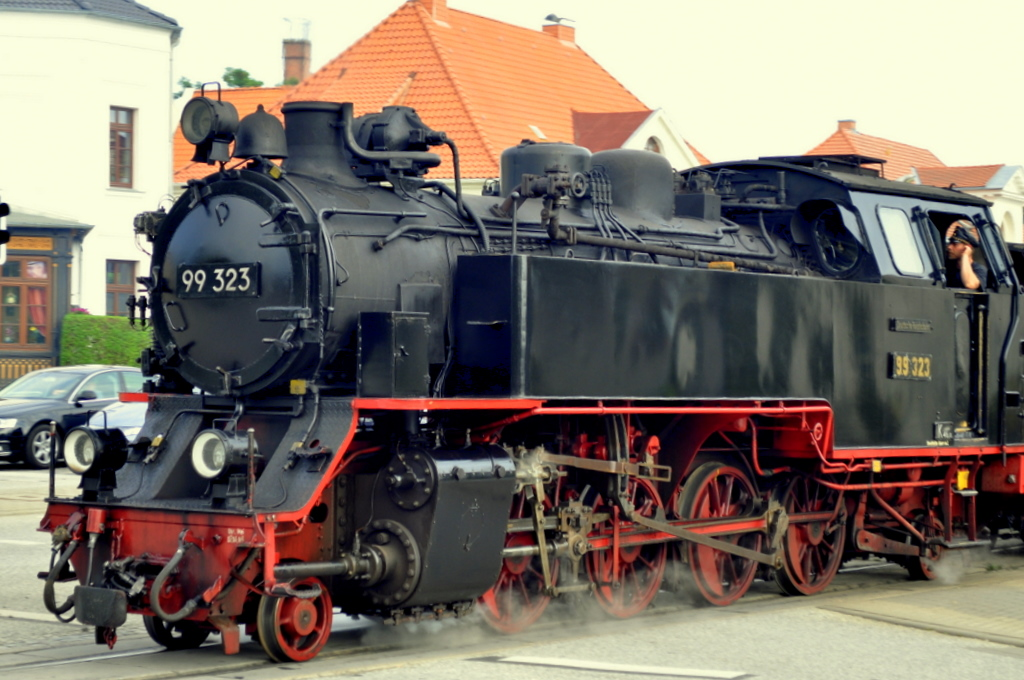
The Molli

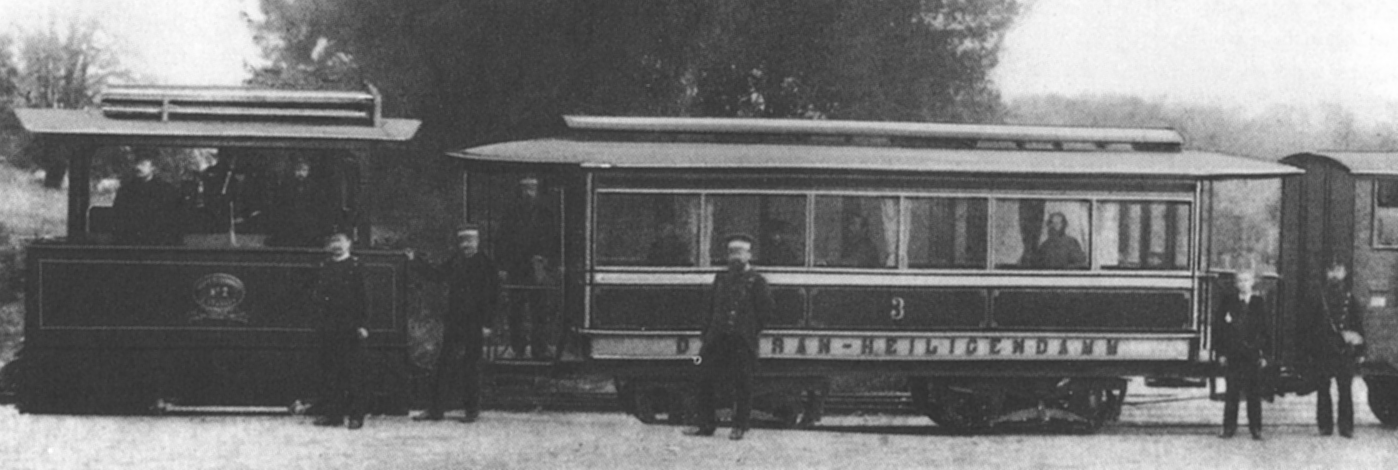
Locomotive no. 2 with a Doberan-Heiligendamm Railway train around 1890

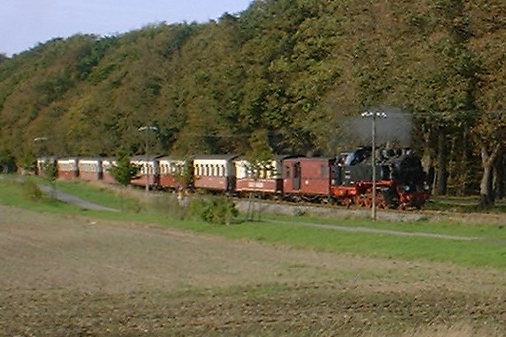
Between Heiligendamm and Bad Doberan

== Stock list ==
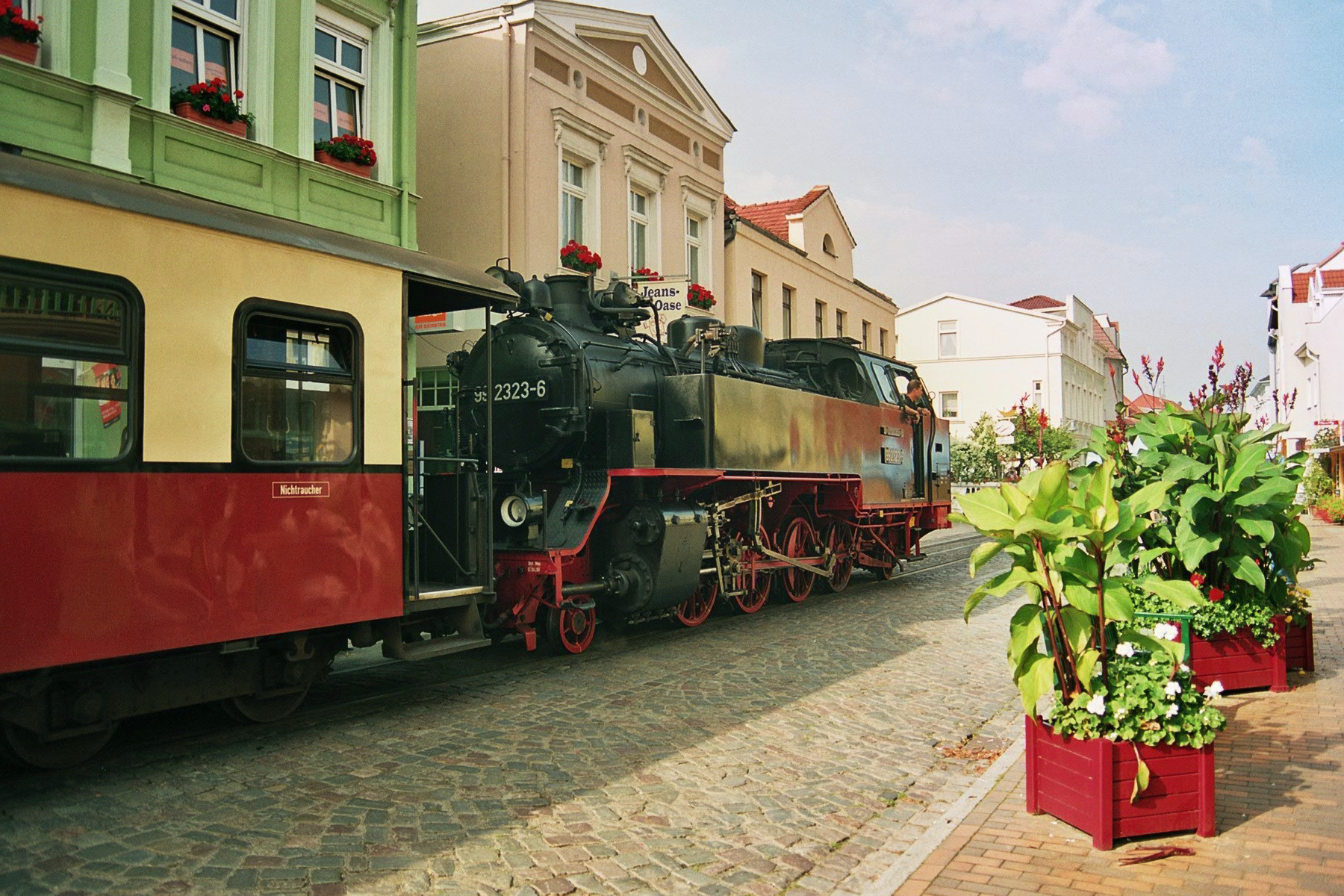
Bäderbahn "Molli" street running through Bad Doberan

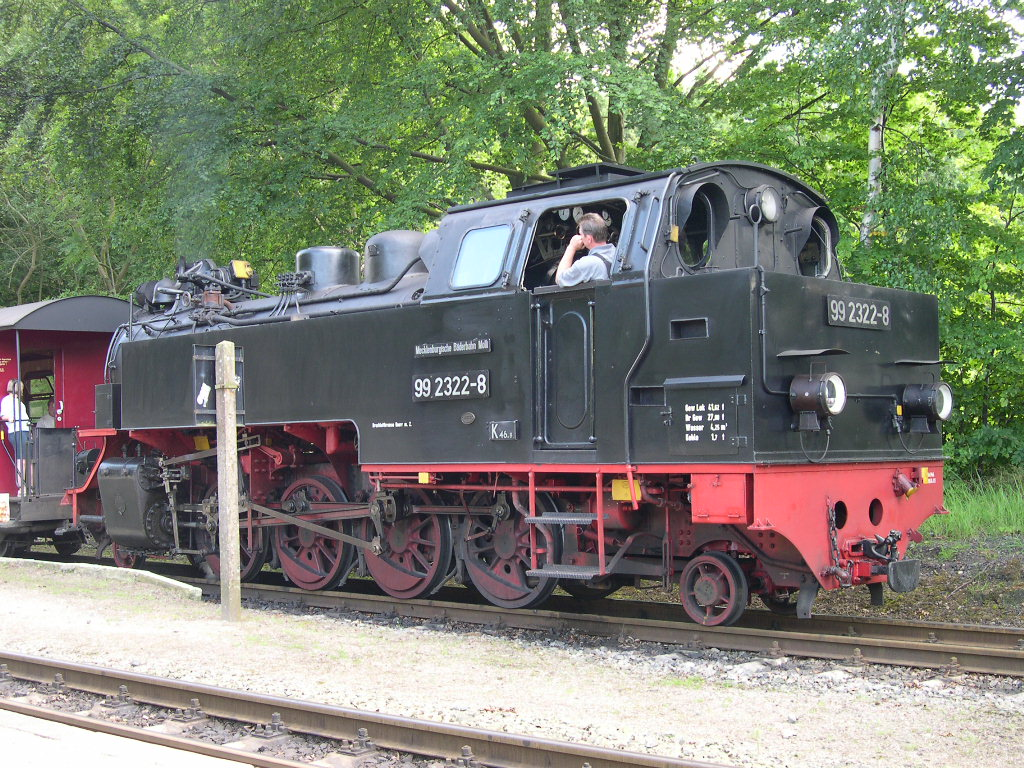
Molli at the station in Heiligendamm

At start-up, two locomotives were available. These engines were later classified as Mecklenburg Class XVIIIs were designed as tram locomotives and were in use until 1915. In 1891 and 1898 the fleet was expanded with triple-coupled locomotives of Class XIX.

From 1910, locomotives of Class T 7 (later 99 301-303) worked the line. At the same time, the Class XIX locomotives were transferred to the Neubukow Beet Railway. The locomotive fleet was reinforced in 1923 by the DR Class 99.31 (99 311-313). These locomotives were all mustered out.

In 1932, the Deutsche Reichsbahn had the much larger, faster and more powerful locomotives of DR Class 99.32 (99 321-323) built. These three locomotives are still working under the numbers 99 2321 to 2323. In 1961, three additional locomotives came to the line from the Wismut industrial railways and were classified as DR Class 99.33 (99 331-333). One of the three, no. 99 331 (later 99 2331), is working and acts as a reserve or as a train locomotive in winter (due to its lower risk of derailment). No. 99 332 is a monument at the Molli Museum at Bad Kühlungsborn West station; loco no. 99 333 was scrapped.

In 2009, the locomotive 99 2324 was built for the Molli Railway at the Meiningen Steam Locomotive Works. It is a replica of a standard locomotive, the DR Class 99.32. This was the first steam locomotive to be built in Germany for regular operations in almost half a century. The reconstruction was based on historic plans using modern manufacturing techniques. To get the rush of photographers out of the way, the new engine bore the running numbers of its sister engines of the same class during trials before being officially accepted into service.

Number	Name	Builder	Type	Date	Works number	Image	Notes
99. 2321-0		Orenstein & Koppel	99.32 2-8-2T	1932	12400		
99. 2322-8		Orenstein & Koppel	99.32 2-8-2T	1932	12401		
99. 2323-6		Orenstein & Koppel	99.32 2-8-2T	1932	12402		
99. 2324-4		Meiningen Steam Locomotive Works	Replica 99.32 2-8-2T	2008/09			
99. 2331-9		LKM	99.33 0-8-0T	1951	30011		
99. 2332-7		LKM	99.33 0-8-0T	1951	30013		
199.014-2		LKM	V 10 C	1962			
199.015-9		LKM	V 10 C	1962			
199.016-7		LKM	V 10 C	1962			
199.017-5		LKM	V 10 C	1962			

== Mollibus ==
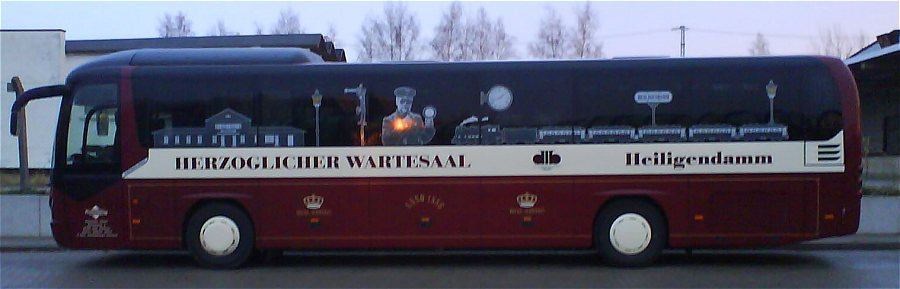
The specially designed bus

Owing to the low tourist demand in the winter, half the trains are cancelled and replaced by the so-called Mollibus. This bus is route number 121 and runs from Rostock Bus station via Bad Doberan, Heiligendamm and Kühlungsborn to Rerik. It is operated by Küstenbus GmbH. Only buses between Bad Doberan and Kühlungsborn are called Mollibus - not all buses drive the whole route. Some buses operate in the summer also in the morning and evening because of the low demand.

== Music ==
The Mecklenburg duo "De Plattfööt" sing in their song, "Holiday up'n Molli an de See", about the Mollibahn in Low German. It was released in 1989 on the AMIGA LP "Wenn du ok Plattfööt hest" (if you have flat feet too). Furthermore, De Plattfööt sing in their song "De Isenbahnboomupundal-dreier" (the railway-barrier-up-and-down-winder) about a railway crossing guard's everyday life.

Since the 1990s, the Molli has also been one of the main ways of getting to the Zappanale, a festival held every summer dedicated to the music of Frank Zappa. The site for the past few years has been the Gallopenrennbahn (racecourse) about halfway between Bad Doberan and the coast.
