= Mecklenburg P 4.2 =

German steam locomotives

Mecklenburg VII Mecklenburg P 4.2 DRG Class 36.6
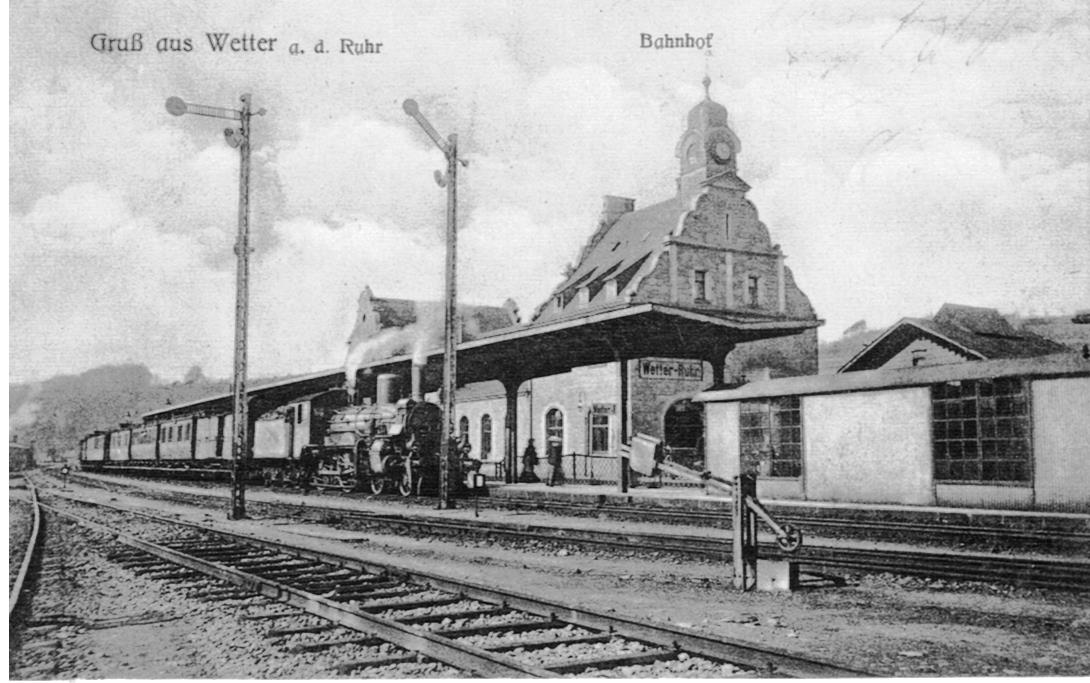
- Prussian P 4.2 in Wetter an der Ruhr.
Type and origin
- Builder: Henschel & Sohn (12); Maschinenbauanstalt Humboldt (10); Linke-Hofmann Werke (9)
- Build date: 1903–1912
- Total produced: 31
Specifications
- Configuration
  - Whyte: 4-4-0
- Gauge: 1,435 mm (4 ft 8 1/2 in)
- Leading dia.: 1,000 mm (3 ft 3 1/4 in)
- Driver dia.: 1,750 mm (5 ft 9 in)
- Length
  - Over beams: 17,645 mm (57 ft 10 3/4 in)
- Axle load: 14.9 tonnes (14.7 long tons; 16.4 short tons)
- Adhesive weight: 19.6 tonnes (19.3 long tons; 21.6 short tons)
- Service weight: 50.4 tonnes (49.6 long tons; 55.6 short tons)
- Water cap.: 12.0 or 16.0 m^{3} (2,600 or 3,500 imp gal; 3,200 or 4,200 US gal)
- Heating surface
  - Firebox: 2.31 m^{2} (24.9 sq ft)
  - Evaporative: 118.85 m^{2} (1,279.3 sq ft)
- Cylinders: 2, compound
- High-pressure cylinder: 460 mm (18 1/8 in)
- Low-pressure cylinder: 680 mm (26 3/4 in)
- Piston stroke: 600 mm (23 5/8 in)
Performance figures
- Maximum speed: 90 km/h (56 mph)
- Indicated power: 580 PS (427 kW; 572 hp)
Career
- Numbers: MFFE: 201–231; DRG: 36 602 – 36 620, 36 651 – 36 662
- Retired: by 1931

The Mecklenburg Class P 4.2, formerly Class VII, were early German steam locomotives operated by the Grand Duchy of Mecklenburg Friedrich-Franz Railway and were used specifically for hauling express trains on the line from Warnemünde to Berlin. They were mechanically identical with the Prussian P 4.2. All 31 units were taken over by the Deutsche Reichsbahn who incorporated them as Class 36.6 with numbers 36 602–620 and 651–662. The first series of numbers were engines with a 14 t axle load, the second those with a 15 t axle load. In 1931, the last locomotive of this class was retired.

No. 36 601 was a Prussian P 4.2 that was redeployed to Mecklenburg in 1920.

Apart from three units, these engines were equipped with Class 2'2' T 16 tenders.
