= Mecklenburg G 2 =

Mecklenburg VIII Mecklenburg G 2
Type and origin
- Builder: Sächsische Maschinenfabrik
- Build date: 1864–1869, 1888
- Total produced: 12
Specifications
- Configuration
  - Whyte: 0-6-0
- Gauge: 1,435 mm (4 ft 8 1/2 in)
- Driver dia.: 1,270 mm (4 ft 2 in)1,420 mm (4 ft 7 7/8 in)
- Length
  - Over beams: 14,352–14,450 mm (47 ft 1 in – 47 ft 5 in)
- Axle load: 12.8 t (12.6 long tons; 14.1 short tons)
- Adhesive weight: 37.8 t (37.2 long tons; 41.7 short tons)
- Empty weight: 34.20 t (33.66 long tons; 37.70 short tons)
- Service weight: 37.8 t (37.2 long tons; 41.7 short tons)
- Boiler
- No. of heating tubes: 193
- Heating tube length: 4,234 mm (13 ft 10 3/4 in)
- Boiler pressure: 10 kgf/cm^{2} (981 kPa; 142 lbf/in^{2})
- Heating surface
  - Firebox: 1.26 m^{2} (13.6 sq ft)
  - Radiative: 7.59 m^{2} (81.7 sq ft)
  - Tubes: 100.12 m^{2} (1,077.7 sq ft)
  - Evaporative: 107.71 m^{2} (1,159.4 sq ft)
- Cylinder size: 610 mm (24 in)
- Piston stroke: 455 mm (17 15/16 in)
Performance figures
- Maximum speed: 45 km/h (28 mph)
Career
- Numbers: new: 1–11, 66; 1895: 315–325, 314
- Retired: 1909–1918

The Mecklenburg Class G 2, formerly Class VIII, were goods train locomotives with the Grand Duchy of Mecklenburg Friedrich-Franz Railway. They were built for the route between Güstrow and Neubrandenburg with its steep inclines.

The engines had crossed Hall cranks (gekreuzte Hallschen Kurbeln), an outside frame, Gooch valve gear and a steam dome towards the front. The boilers on all the surviving engines were replaced between 1892 and 1897. In 1895 only four were still in the fleet. The last one was withdrawn around the turn of the 20th century.

== See also ==
- Grand Duchy of Mecklenburg Friedrich-Franz Railway
- List of Mecklenburg locomotives
