= DRG Class 99.32 =

Class of German steam locomotives

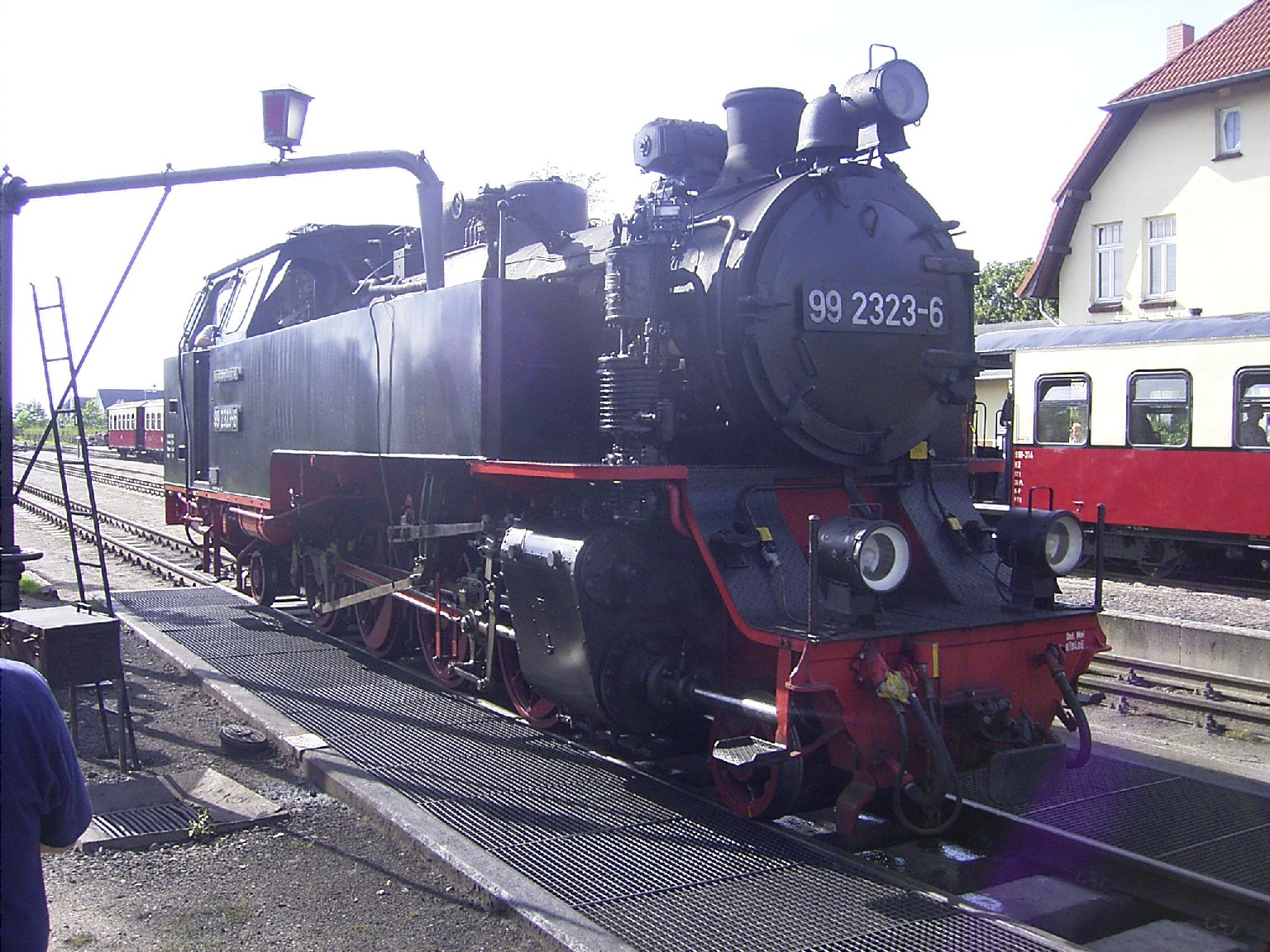
- 99 2323-6 in August 2006
Type and origin
- Power type: Steam
- Builder: Orenstein & Koppel (3); DLW Meiningen (1)
- Serial number: O&K: 12400–12402
- Build date: 1932 (3), 2009 (1)
- Total produced: 4
Specifications
- Configuration
  - Whyte: 2-8-2T
  - UIC: 1′D1′ h2t
  - German: K 46.8
- Gauge: 900 mm (2 ft 11 7/16 in)
- Leading dia.: 550 mm (1 ft 9 5/8 in)
- Driver dia.: 1,100 mm (3 ft 7 1/4 in)
- Trailing dia.: 550 mm (1 ft 9 5/8 in)
- Wheelbase
  - Axle spacing (Asymmetrical): 2,050 mm (6 ft 8 3/4 in) +; 1,325 mm (4 ft 4 1/8 in) +; 1,325 mm (4 ft 4 1/8 in) +; 1,325 mm (4 ft 4 1/8 in) +; 2,050 mm (6 ft 8 3/4 in) =
  - Engine: 8,075 mm (26 ft 5 7/8 in)
- Length
  - Over headstocks: 9,795 mm (32 ft 1 5/8 in)
  - Over buffers: 10,595 mm (34 ft 9 1/8 in)
- Height: 3,400 mm (11 ft 1 7/8 in)
- Axle load: 7.95 t (7.82 long tons; 8.76 short tons)
- Adhesive weight: 31.80 t (31.30 long tons; 35.05 short tons)
- Empty weight: 35.15 t (34.59 long tons; 38.75 short tons)
- Service weight: 43.68 t (42.99 long tons; 48.15 short tons)
- Fuel type: Coal
- Fuel capacity: 1.7 t (1.7 long tons; 1.9 short tons)
- Water cap.: 4.25 m^{3} (935 imp gal; 1,120 US gal)
- Firebox
  - Grate area: 1.62 m^{2} (17.4 sq ft)
- Boiler
  - Pitch: 2,250 mm (7 ft 4 5/8 in)
  - Tube plates: 3,500 mm (11 ft 5 3/4 in)
  - Small tubes: 44 mm (1 3/4 in), 4 off
  - Large tubes: 76 mm (3 in), 69 off
- Boiler pressure: 14 bar (14.3 kgf/cm^{2}; 203 psi)
- Heating surface
  - Firebox: 5.80 m^{2} (62.4 sq ft)
  - Tubes: 1.74 m^{2} (18.7 sq ft)
  - Flues: 53.00 m^{2} (570.5 sq ft)
  - Total surface: 60.54 m^{2} (651.6 sq ft)
- Superheater
  - Heating area: 30.60 m^{2} (329.4 sq ft)
- Cylinders: Two, outside
- Cylinder size: 380 mm × 550 mm (14 15/16 in × 21 5/8 in)
- Valve gear: Heusinger (Walschaerts)
Performance figures
- Maximum speed: 50 km/h (31 mph)
- Indicated power: 460 PS (338 kW; 454 hp)
- Tractive effort: 59.33 kN (13,340 lbf)
Career
- Numbers: DRG: 99 321 – 99 323; DR: 99 2321 – 99 2323; DBAG: 099 231 – 099 233; MBB: 99 2321 – 99 2324
- Disposition: All operational

The Class 99.32 engines are standard steam locomotives (Einheitsdampflokomotiven) in service with the Deutsche Reichsbahn in Germany. The three examples built are still working today on the Bäderbahn Molli (Molli Spa Railway) between Bad Doberan and Kühlungsborn-West. A feature of the engines is the tapered driver's cab due to the restricted loading gauge of the upper section of the line. With a top speed of 50 km/h it is one of the fastest narrow gauge locomotive classes in the whole of Germany, however it cannot run at that speed on this particular route.

Together with the DRG Class 99.33s, they are the only steam locomotives on the Bäderbahn Molli. Because the small Wismut engines have a low tractive effort and top speed, the search for alternatives started. As a result, in 2009 a fourth Einheitslok was built in Dampflokwerk Meiningen. All four are in service at Kühlungsborn West.

== See also ==
- List of DRG locomotives and railbuses
