= Mecklenburg T 7 =

Mecklenburg T 7 DRG Class 99.30
Type and origin
- Builder: Henschel
- Build date: 1910–14
- Total produced: 3
Specifications
- Configuration
  - Whyte: 0-6-0T
  - German: K.33.6
- Gauge: 900 mm (2 ft 11 7/16 in)
- Driver dia.: 700 mm (2 ft 3 1/2 in)
- Wheelbase
  - Overall: 1,800 mm (5 ft 10 3/4 in)
- Length
  - Over beams: 5,650 mm (18 ft 6 1/2 in)
- Height: 3,330 mm (10 ft 11 1/8 in)
- Adhesive weight: 16.2 t (15.9 long tons; 17.9 short tons)
- Empty weight: 13 t (13 long tons; 14 short tons)
- Service weight: 16.2 t (15.9 long tons; 17.9 short tons)
- Fuel capacity: 750 kg (1,650 lb) coal
- Water cap.: 1.7 m^{3} (370 imp gal; 450 US gal)
- Boiler pressure: 12 kg/cm^{2} (1,180 kPa; 171 lbf/in^{2})
- Heating surface
  - Firebox: 0.56 m^{2} (6.0 sq ft)
  - Radiative: 2.64 m^{2} (28.4 sq ft)
  - Evaporative: 30.05 m^{2} (323.5 sq ft)
- Cylinders: 2
- Cylinder size: 260 mm (10 1/4 in)
- Piston stroke: 400 mm (15 3/4 in)
- Valve gear: Stephenson
Performance figures
- Maximum speed: 30 km/h (19 mph)
- Indicated power: 125 PS (91.9 kW; 123 hp)
- Tractive effort
  - Starting: 22.95 kN (5,160 lbf)
Career
- Numbers: MFFE: 1005–1007; DRG: 99 301 – 99 303
- Retired: 1948

The Mecklenburg T 7 engines were German, six-coupled, narrow gauge, steam locomotives with the Grand Duchy of Mecklenburg Friedrich-Franz Railway (Großherzoglich Mecklenburgische Friedrich-Franz-Eisenbahn). They were employed on the Bäderbahn between Bad Doberan and Heiligendamm. They replaced the existing vehicles after the line had been extended to 15.4 kilometres to Arendsee. The three engines, which were later given the numbers 99 301 - 99 303 in the 1920s by the Deutsche Reichsbahn, were delivered in 1910, 1911 and 1914. The design of these locomotives was heavily based on those of the Class T 3 from Prussia. Later, two units went to the so-called Rübenbahn ('Turnip Railway'), the branch line from Tangermünde to Lüderitz. No. 99 302 was retired in 1932, the other two were given to the USSR in 1945 as reparations.

== See also ==
- Grand Duchy of Mecklenburg Friedrich-Franz Railway
- List of Mecklenburg locomotives
