= Spoitgendorf =

Coordinates: 53°51′N 12°17′E

Spoitgendorf is a village in the district of Rostock in Mecklenburg-Western Pomerania (Mecklenburg-Vorpommern) in Germany. It has a population of approximately 200 people and is around 30 kilometres far away from Rostock. As of 2005, Spoitgendorf is part of the municipality of Plaaz. The "Spoitgendorf Castle" is an important building in this village.
