= Mecklenburg I =

Mecklenburg I
Marschall Vorwärts
Numbering:	1	3	4	5
Numbering up to 1895:	42	45, 46	55, 56	57
Name:	MARSCHALL VORWÄRTS	SCHWAAN, NEBEL	HERTHA, FREYA	HULDA
Manufacturer:	Wöhlert	Borsig		Egestorff
Years of Manufacture:	1848	1850	1860	1863
Retired:	1900	1898, 1890	1894, 1899	1901
Wheel arrangement:	2-2-2			
Axle arrangement:	1A1n2			
Track gauge:	1,435 mm (4 ft 8 1/2 in)			
Length over buffers:	≈ 12,500 mm			
Empty weight:	22.10 t	20.40 t	20.40 t	23.65 t
Service weight:	24.15 t	21.62 t	20.99 t	25.97 t
Adhesive weight:	11.90 t	10.85 t	11.20 t	12.75 t
Coupled wheel diameter:	1618 mm	1535 mm	1535 mm	1700 mm
Carrying wheel diameter:	1070 mm	1015 mm	1015 mm	1142 mm
Valve gear:	Stephenson			
No. of cylinders:	2			
Cylinder bore:	343 mm	330 mm	330 mm	356 mm
Piston stroke:	508 mm			
Boiler overpressure:	7,89 bar	6,58 bar	6,58 bar	7,31 bar
No. of heating tubes:	136	123	119	154
Heating tube length:	3331 mm	3000 mm	3325 mm, 3330 mm	3280 mm
Grate area:	1.15 m^{2}	1.09 m^{2}	0.80 m^{2}, 0.82 m^{2}	1.13 m^{2}
Radiative heating area:	5.81 m^{2}	5.88 m^{2}	4.32 m^{2}, 4.49 m^{2}	5.92 m^{2}
Heating tube area:	56.66 m^{2}	48.71 m^{2}	50.96 m^{2}, 50.89 m^{2}	68.19 m^{2}
Evaporative heating area:	62.47 m^{2}	54.59 m^{2}	55.28 m^{2}, 55.38 m^{2}	74.11 m^{2}

The Grand Duchy of Mecklenburg Friedrich-Franz Railway grouped the various 2-2-2 steam locomotives procured between 1848 and 1863 into its Mecklenburg Class I.

== History ==
The MARSCHALL VORWÄRTS was delivered in 1848 by the Berlin locomotive works, Lokomotivfabrik F. Wöhlert, with factory number 1 and was given the running number 4 by the Mecklenburg Railway Company (Mecklenburgische Eisenbahngesellschaft). On its nationalisation, the locomotive was renumbered to 42 and, on the introduction of a new numbering plan in 1895, to number 1. In 1866 the locomotive was given a new boiler and was retired in 1900. During a visit to the workshop the driving axle was incorrectly fitted by mistake, with the result that the locomotive ran backwards through the wall of the shed during the ensuing test run.

The locomotives SCHWAAN and NEBEL were delivered in 1850 by Borsig and given railway numbers 9 and 10. On nationalisation they were renumbered to 45 and 46. NEBEL was retired in 1890, whilst SCHWAAN continued in service until 1898 and from 1895 carried the number 3.

HERTHA and FREYA were also delivered by Borsig - in 1860 - and allocated numbers 23 and 24. They were renumbered to 55 and 56 on nationalisation and, subsequently, to 4 and 5 in 1895. The engines were retired in 1894 and 1899.

In 1863 Egestorff supplied no. 25, HULDA. The engine was allocated number 57 after nationalisations and number 5 in 1895. In 1901 she was retired.

The performance of these locomotives was sufficient for level routes. They were mainly placed in charge of passenger trains on the Hagenow–Rostock line and occasionally hauled mixed trains.

== Design features ==
The locomotives had an inside forked frame (Gabelrahmen). The boiler barrel comprised two (and on HULDA three), shells. The steam dome was located on the centre one, and on HULDA on the front shell.

On HULDA the firebox extended under the trailing axle by means of a sloping base in order to achieve the greatest possible grate area. Apart from MARSCHALL VORWÄRTS which had a conical chimney, all the engines had long cylindrical smokestacks.

The two-cylinder wet steam engine was located on the outside horizontally. The Stephenson valve gear was inside. On the SCHWAAN and the NEBEL the cylinders were angled and attached to the smokebox, the valve gear was external as well. HULDA had a screw reversing gear.

The suspension on the driving wheels was achieved by leaf springs underneath and was linked to the leaf springs of the leading wheels using a compensating lever. HULDA had a transverse leaf spring under the trailing axle, this axle was unsprung on the other engines.

The locomotives were coupled to four-wheeled tenders which had a water capacity of 4.45 m^{3} and 3 t coal tank.

== See also ==
- Grand Duchy of Mecklenburg Friedrich-Franz Railway
- List of Mecklenburg locomotives

== Sources ==
- Kirsche, Hans-Joachim; Lohr, Hermann; Thielmann, Georg (1989). Lokomotiv-Archiv Mecklenburg/Oldenburg (in German). Berlin: transpress. ISBN 3-344-00326-7.
