= Plaaz =

- Municipality
- Location of Plaaz within Rostock district
- Interactive map of Plaaz
- Location within Germany Location within Mecklenburg-Vorpommern
- Coordinates: 53°50′29″N 12°20′23″E
- Country: Germany
- State: Mecklenburg-Vorpommern
- District: Rostock
- Municipal assoc.: Güstrow-Land

Government
  - Mayor: Manfred Bildat

Area
  - Total: 34.24 km^{2} (13.22 sq mi)
- Elevation: 60 m (200 ft)

Population (2025-12-31)
  - Total: 740
  - Density: 22/km^{2} (56/sq mi)
- Time zone: UTC+01:00 (CET)
  - Summer (DST): UTC+02:00 (CEST)
- Postal codes: 18276
- Dialling codes: 038455
- Vehicle registration: LRO
- Website: www.amt-guestrow-land.de

Plaaz is a municipality in the Rostock district, in Mecklenburg-Vorpommern, Germany. It is situated close to the cities Güstrow, Laage and Teterow. Plaaz includes several villages such as Mierendorf, Wendorf and Zapkendorf. As of January 2005, both Spoitgendorf and Recknitz are incorporated in this municipality.
