= Karow, Mecklenburg-Vorpommern =

Karow
- Ortsteil of Plau am See
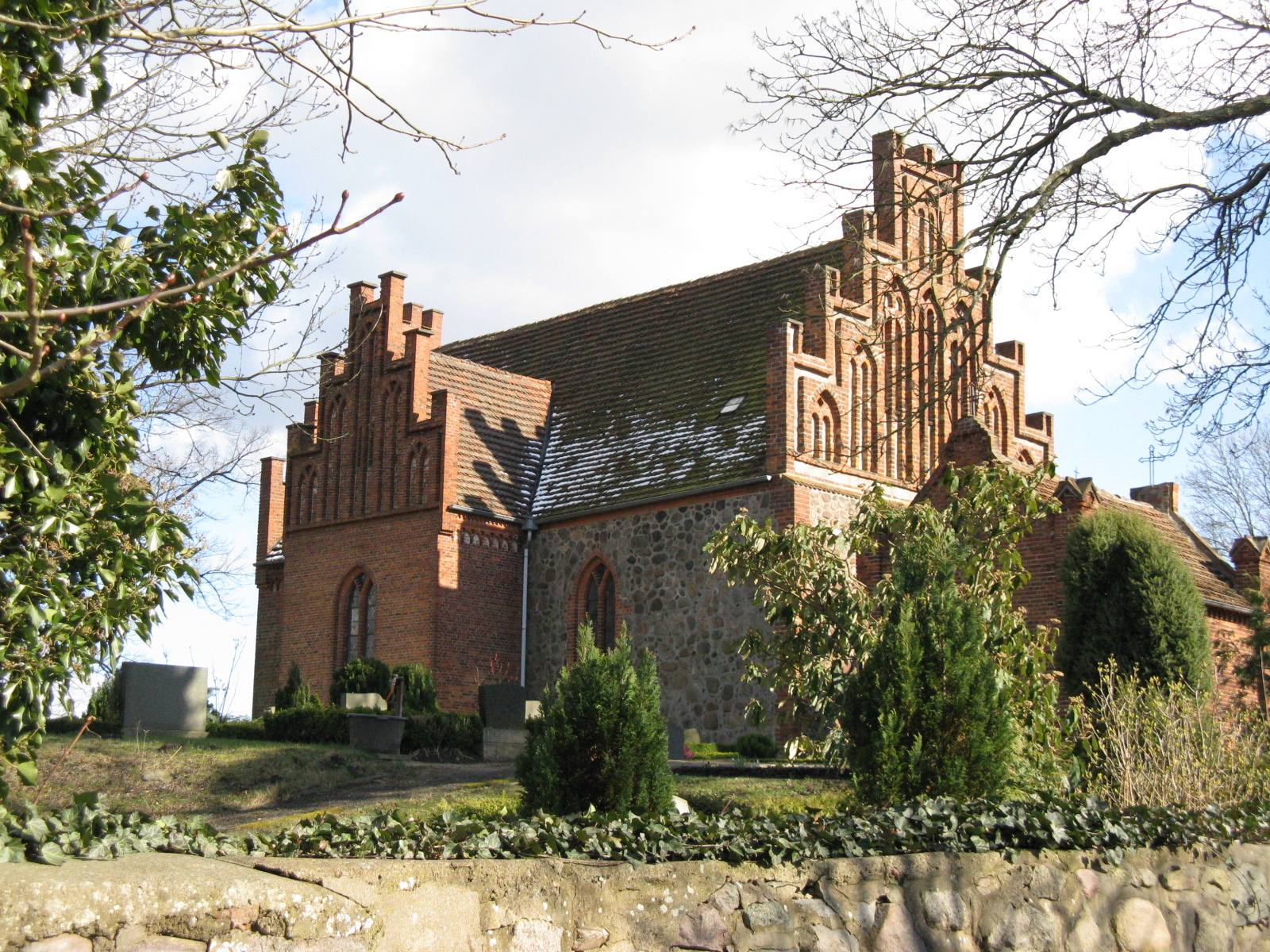
- Church

- Coat of arms
- Interactive map of Karow
- Location within Germany Location within Mecklenburg-Vorpommern
- Coordinates: 53°31′N 12°16′E
- Country: Germany
- State: Mecklenburg-Vorpommern
- District: Ludwigslust-Parchim
- Town: Plau am See

Area
  - Total: 38.53 km^{2} (14.88 sq mi)
- Elevation: 64 m (210 ft)

Population (2009-12-31)
  - Total: 758
  - Density: 19.7/km^{2} (51.0/sq mi)
- Time zone: UTC+01:00 (CET)
  - Summer (DST): UTC+02:00 (CEST)
- Postal codes: 19395
- Dialling codes: 038738
- Vehicle registration: PCH
- Website: www.gemeinde-karow.de

Karow (German pronunciation: [ˈkaːʁo]) is a village and a former municipality in the Ludwigslust-Parchim district, in Mecklenburg-Vorpommern, Germany. Since 1 January 2011, it is part of the town Plau am See.
