= Equalising beam =

Suspension bar in railway rolling stock

An equalising beam, equalising lever or equalising bar (British: compensating beam) links the suspension of two or more adjacent axles of a vehicle, especially a railway locomotive.

== On steam locomotives ==
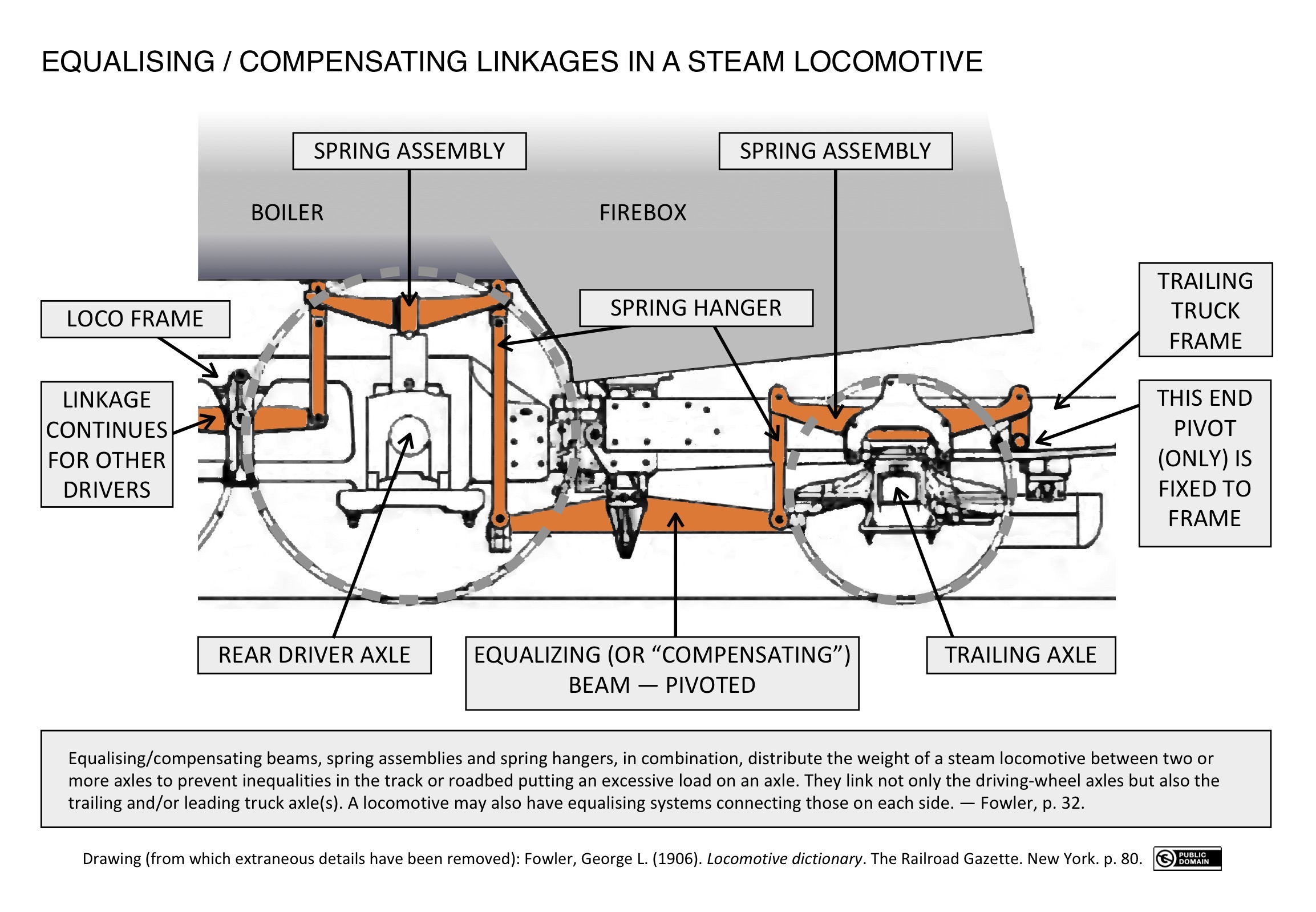
An equalising beam (centre), in combination with spring assemblies and spring hangers, distributes the locomotive's load to prevent inequalities in the track or roadbed putting an excessive load on an axle

On steam locomotives, the beam is connected at each end to a spring on an axle or to the end of another equalising beam (usually via a vertical spring hanger) to distribute the locomotive's weight between two or more axles. An equalising system links not only the driving-wheel axles but also the trailing and/or leading truck axle(s). Its purpose is to prevent inequalities in the track or roadbed putting an excessive load on an axle. There is one system on each side of the locomotive; on some steam locomotives, there may also be a transverse equalising system connecting them.

== On diesel locomotives ==
On a contemporary diesel locomotive, equalising is confined to each bogie (US: truck); there is no linkage between bogies, which are inherently flexible compared with steam locomotive frames. Coil springs, matched to the weight bearing on the equalising beam, are a crucial element of the design.

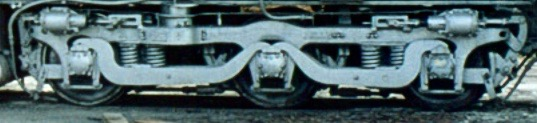

Bogie with a pair of prominent equalising beams on an Alco diesel-electric locomotive

== On rolling stock ==
As with locomotives, equalising on rolling stock bogies aims to minimise reactionary force being transmitted to the rails because of track irregularities, which would occur if the axles were mounted rigidly. In addition, equalising beams and other linkages are configured to improve riding qualities for the comfort of passengers. Although features such as airbag springing and motion feedback devices on individual axles have featured in recent designs, currently the most prevalent designs are a mix of equalising beam, coil springs, hydraulic dampers, swing links and torsion bars. The most common designs throughout the world are variants of the "Commonwealth" bogie/truck manufactured by the successor company to the Commonwealth Steel Company, of Granite City, Illinois, United States. It has exceptional riding qualities. The photo shows a Commonwealth bogie on a South Australian Railways Bluebird railcar, first manufactured under licence in 1954 by Bradford Kendall, Sydney, Australia. The central element is the equalising beam, on which a spring set (with an inner and an outer coil) rests at each end. Other components are, from left to right: an axlebox with roller bearing; a pair of swing links and short beam supporting a nest of coil springs and a vertical hydraulic motion damper; and a horizontal damper. An air-brake cylinder is to the far right.

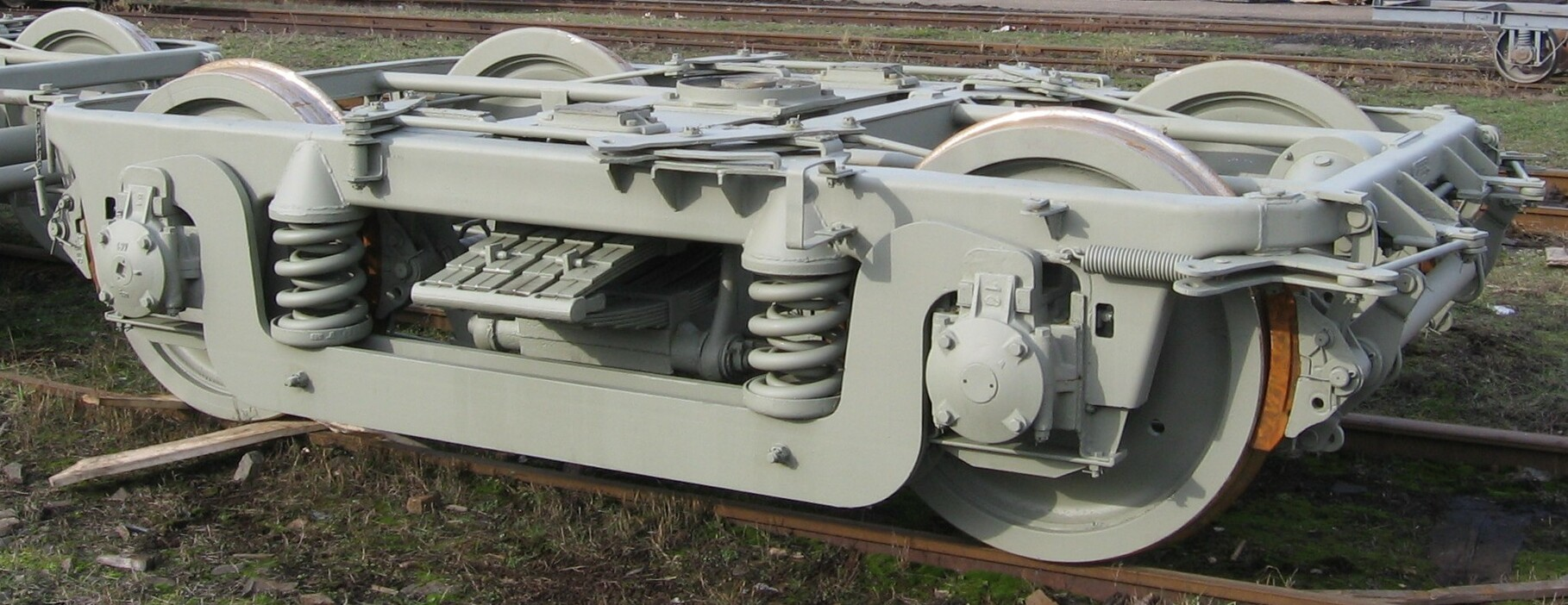

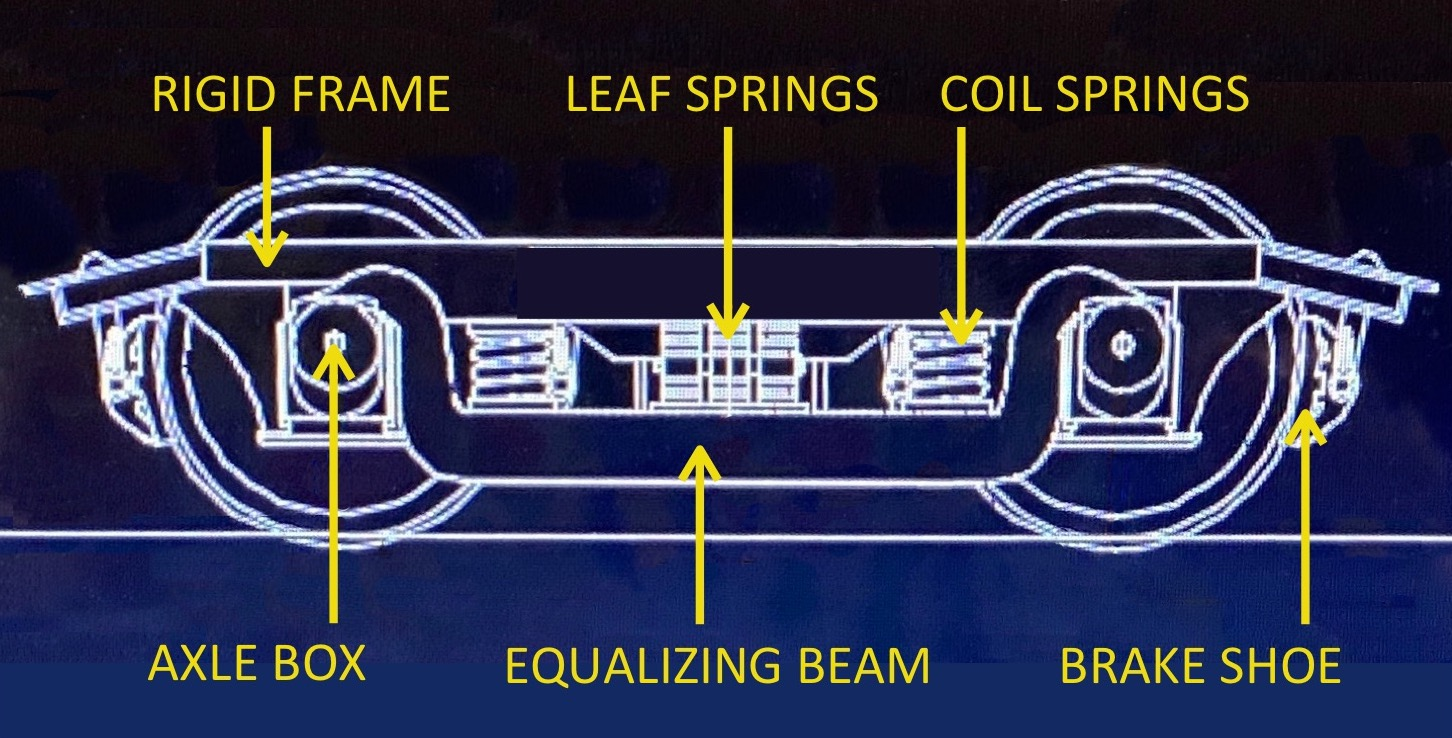

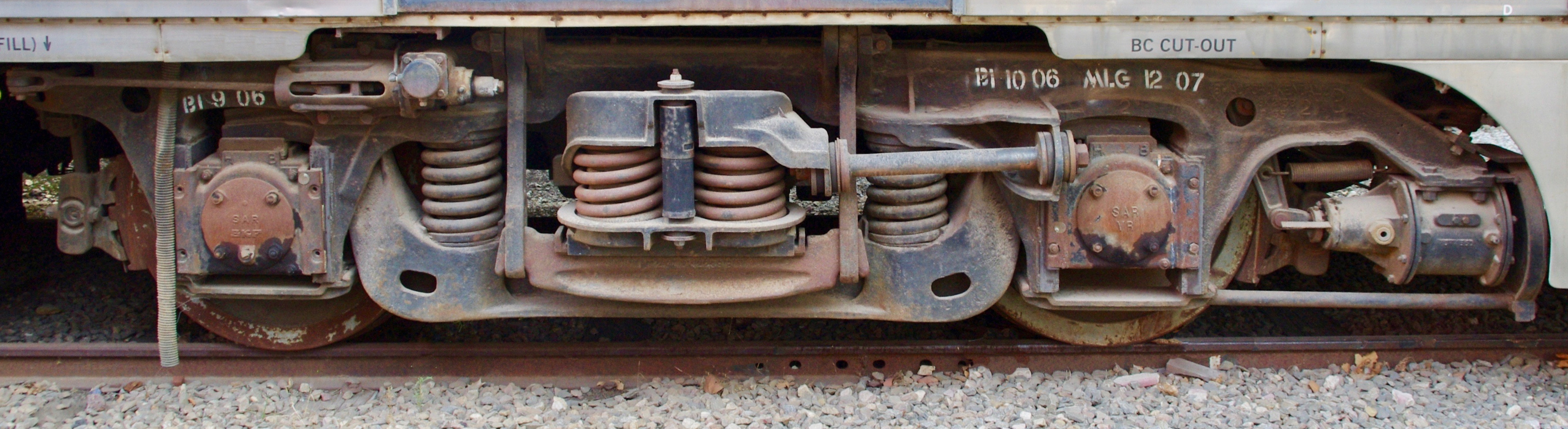

A Czech Railways bogie in which an equalising beam rests on the two axleboxes. This design is common on fast freight vehicles and commuter trains.

Main components of a simple equalised bogie on passenger rolling stock

A South Australian Railways variant of the Commonwealth bogie design, incorporating an equalising beam and several components to stabilise the motion of the passenger car: double-coil springs, hydraulic motion damper and swing links

== See also ==
Semmens, P.W.B. and Goldfinch A.J. (2003). How Steam Locomotives Really Work, Oxford and New York, OUP, pp. 242-243. ISBN 978-0-19-860782-3.
