= Grand Duchy of Mecklenburg Friedrich-Franz Railway =

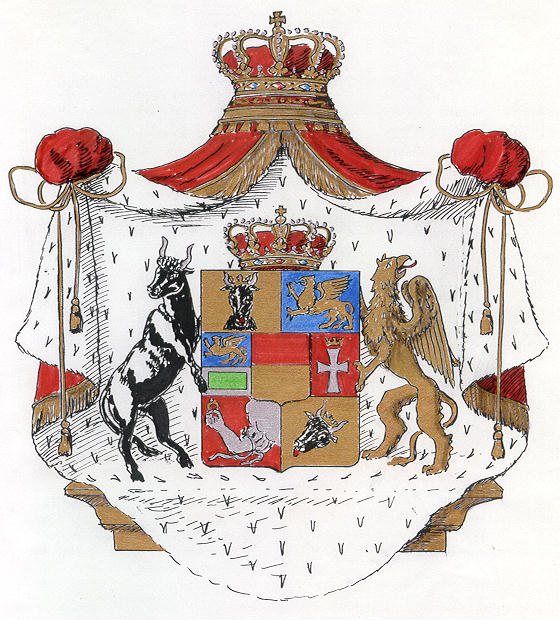
Coat of arms of the Grand Duchy of Mecklenburg

The Grand Duchy of Mecklenburg Friedrich-Franz Railway (Großherzoglich Mecklenburgische Friedrich-Franz-Eisenbahn or M.F.F.E.) was the state railway company in Mecklenburg-Schwerin and Mecklenburg-Strelitz. After its second nationalisation in 1890 up to the merger of the Länderbahnen into the Deutsche Reichsbahn in 1920 it was under the direction of the Grand Duchy's Executive Railway Board (Großherzoglichen General-Eisenbahndirection or GGED) in Schwerin.

== Context ==
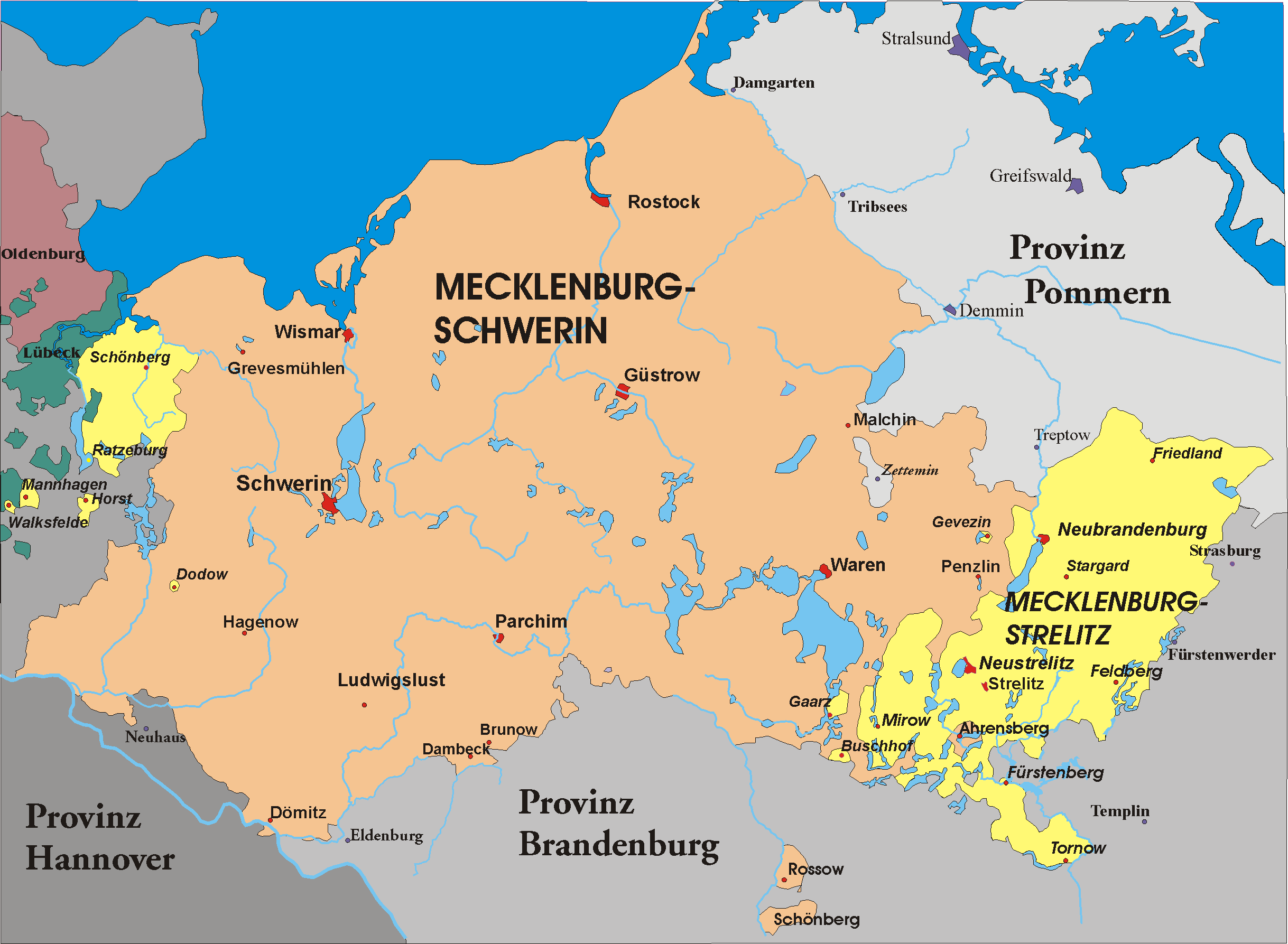
The former duchies of Meckenburg 1866-1934

Mecklenburg is a region in northern Germany comprising the western and larger part of the present day state of Mecklenburg-Vorpommern. Its largest cities are Rostock, Schwerin, and Neubrandenburg. In 1815, the two Mecklenburg duchies - Grand Duchy of Mecklenburg-Schwerin and Mecklenburg-Strelitz - were raised to Grand Duchies, and subsequently existed separately in Germany until the end of World War I. The earlier private railways were nationalised by 1890 into the Grand Duchy of Mecklenburg Friedrich-Franz Railway.

== En Route to a state railway ==
=== First railways in Mecklenburg ===
The first railway route in Mecklenburg was the Prussian Berlin–Hamburg line, which opened in 1846. As a result, stations appeared in Ludwigslust and Hagenow and other places. On 10 March 1846 the Mecklenburg Railway Company was given the concession to build a route from Hagenow to Schwerin and on to Wismar, and via Bützow to Rostock with a branch to Güstrow. On 13 May 1850 the line was finished.

=== The Friedrich-Franz railway ===
Although the Mecklenburg Railway Company had completed the line, it lacked an east–west link that would also connect to the Grand Duchy of Mecklenburg-Strelitz.

Because there were no financially influential backers, the route Güstrow - Teterow – Malchin – Neubrandenburg was built on the initiative of the Grand Duke of Mecklenburg-Schwerin under sovereign ownership. The route was opened on 11 November 1864 at Teterow station in the presence of both the Mecklenburg grand dukes. This was followed in 1867 by a railway connexion over the Prussian border to Strasburg (Uckermark). The railway division established its headquarters in Malchin. To continue the route as far as Lübeck the Lübeck-Kleinen Railway Company was founded and it was given the concession on 20 December 1865 to build the line. After 1868 its construction had to be discontinued due to a lack of funding; the state took over the line on 24 April 1870 and began operations on 1 July 1870 between Kleinen and Lübeck. In Lübeck the Friedrich-Franz line built its own goods station, called the Lübeck Mecklenburg marshalling station. For passenger services it shared the Lübeck-Büchen railway's station.

=== First nationalisation ===
The desire for state control over the construction and operation of railways led in 1873 to the nationalisation of the railways in Mecklenburg. The Mecklenburg government also wanted to preempt the purchase of the railways by the Reich railways planned by Chancellor Otto von Bismarck. The operating profits of the Mecklenburg Railway Company were another reason for the takeover.

On 20 April 1873 the state government bought the Mecklenburg Railway Company and merged it with the Friedrich-Franz Railway into the Grand Duchy of Mecklenburg Friedrich-Franz Railway. The headquarters of the company was moved from Malchin to the state capital, Schwerin.

=== Reprivatisation ===
In 1875, the Grand Duchy of Mecklenburg Friedrich-Franz Railway was reprivatised. The reason was a dispute between the former railway shareholders and the government, because the latter could not pay back the circa 10 million thalers (30 million marks) from the railway purchase. The outcome of the dispute was the formation of the Mecklenburg Friedrich-Franz Railway Company (Mecklenburgischen Friedrich-Franz-Eisenbahngesellschaft or M.F.F.E.) as a limited company on 2 April 1875. This private railway company existed until the second nationalisation on 1 February 1890. Under the M.F.F.E. a railway line was built between Waren und Malchin.

Between 1875 and 1890 a multitude of new railway routes emerged, built by private railway concerns.

- The Parchim-Ludwigslust Railway constructed a line between the towns of the same name.
- The Güstrow-Plau Railway built a route from Plaaz via Güstrow as far as Meyenburg on the Prussian border.
- The Wismar-Rostock Railway put in the direct connexion between the two harbour towns.
- The Gnoien-Teterow Railway linked the town of Gnoien to the network.
- The Mecklenburg Southern Railway succeeded in building the connexion between Parchim, Lübz, Waren (Müritz), Penzlin and Neubrandenburg.
- The Lloyd Railway built a connexion from Neustrelitz via Waren to Rostock and Warnemünde.
- The Wismar-Karow Railway made a link to the railway junction at Karow, where the Southern Railway and Güstrow-Plau Railway crossed.
- Finally the construction of the narrow gauge Doberan-Heiligendamm Railway was completed.

== Grand Duchy of Mecklenburg Friedrich-Franz Railway ==
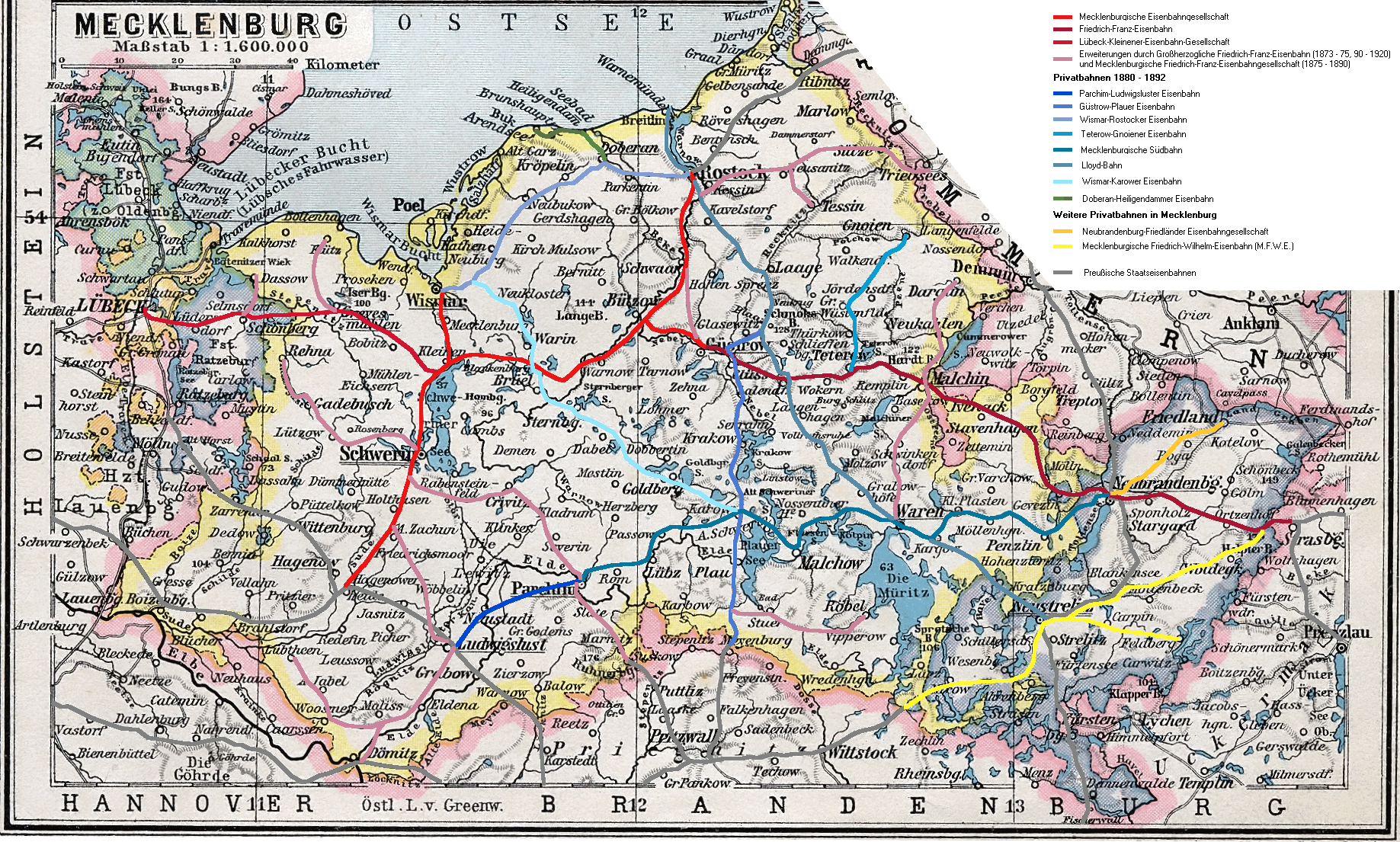
Railway network in Mecklenburg, based on a 1905 map

On the second nationalisation in 1889/1890 the management of the state railway was transferred to the GGED (see above). The railway was known from then on as the Grand Duchy of Mecklenburg Friedrich-Franz Railway (Großherzoglich Mecklenburgische Friedrich-Franz-Eisenbahn, M.F.F.E.)

In 1889/1890 all existing nine private railways were purchased by the state, the acquisition of the larger, more profitable companies taking a little longer.

The 'Grand Duchy of Mecklenburg Friedrich-Franz Railway built a number of new routes in order to provide better rail transport services for the country:

- Tessin|Rostock–(Bad)Sülze–Tribsees (with a connexion to the Franzburg Southern Railway and the Tribsees–Grimmen–Greifswald route (1895)
- Schwerin–Rehna (1897)
- Grevesmühlen–Klütz (1905)
- Schönberg–Dassow (1905)
- Malchin–Dargun (1907)
- Heiligendamm–Arendsee (today the Baltic Sea spa Kühlungsborn-West)(1910).

=== Mecklenburg railway ferries on the Baltic Sea ===
In 1903 the post steamer link from Warnemünde to Nykøbing/Falster, which had existed since 1886, was replaced by a railway ferry from Warnemünde to Gedser. The M.F.F.E. built a new station for it in Warnemünde and a harbour with two ferry berths. For the ferry traffic, two ferries were purchased: the "Friedrich-Franz IV" and the "Mecklenburg". The ferry line was operated jointly with the Danish State Railways. The ferry line enabled direct, through trains possible from Berlin to Copenhagen.

=== War, November Revolution, Deutsche Reichsbahn ===
The onset of the First World War started the last chapter for the M.F.F.E. Railway traffic was reprioritised to support the war. Railway officials were called to war to an unprecedented extent. Railway materiel had to be given to other railways and railway operations were coordinated under the direction of the military across state and railway administration boundaries.

After the November Revolution and the abdication of the Grand Duke on 13 November 1918 the railways were renamed the Mecklenburg State Railway (Mecklenburgische Landeseisenbahn) and transferred to the Reich Railways (Deutsche Reichsbahn) in accordance with the requirements of the Weimar Reich Constitution. The management authority for the Reichseisenbahnen in Mecklenburg was the Reichsbahn division of Schwerin.

== Locomotives in Mecklenburg ==
Mecklenburg centred its procurement of locomotives on its largest neighbour, Prussia. As far as possible, Prussian designs were used. One genuine Mecklenburg engine was the T 4, a tank locomotive for branch line operations. In contrast to other German railway administrations the M.F.F.E. ordered no express train locomotives. The transportation of international express trains from Berlin via Warnemünde and Gedser to Copenhagen and the fast trains from Rostock to Hamburg were handled by Prussian P 8s, that with a top speed of 100 km/h had sufficiently high speeds for those services.

An overview of the engines used by the M.F.F.E. is given in the List of Mecklenburg locomotives.

== Memories of the M.F.F.E. today ==
Only a few signs of Mecklenburg' former railway are left today. In Schwerin the building of the Grand Duchy's Executive Railway Board (Großherzoglichen General-Eisenbahndirection), which housed the Reichsbahn division of Schwerin until its disbandment, still stands. On the routes there are a few incline markers with the characteristic M.F.F.E. in the centre and the functional, yet attractive, old station buildings from the early days of the railway, for example in Teterow, Malchin and Stavenhagen. Other memorabilia from the Grand Duchy of Mecklenburg Friedrich-Franz Railway are housed by the Molli Museum at Kühlungsborn-West station on the so-called Molli's Spa Railway (Bäderbahn Molli).

== See also ==
- Mecklenburg
- List of Mecklenburg locomotives
