= Class 98 =

Class 98 may refer to:

- British Rail Class 98
- DRG or DR Class 98, a German steam locomotive class which included ex-Länderbahn, branch line and other miscellaneous locomotives in the Deutsche Reichsbahn comprising the following sub-classes:
  - Class 98.0: Saxon I TV
  - Class 98.1: Oldenburg T 2
  - Class 98.2: Oldenburg T 3
  - Class 98.3: Bavarian PtL 2/2
  - Class 98.4: Palatine T 4.II
  - Class 98.4-5: Bavarian D XI, Bavarian PtL 3/4
  - Class 98.6: Palatine T 4.I, Bavarian D VIII, Palatine D VIII
  - Class 98.7: Bavarian BB II
  - Class 98.8-9: Bavarian GtL 4/4
  - Class 98.10: Neubaulokomotive
  - Class 98.11: Rebuild from 98.8-9
  - Class 98.12: BBÖ Class 162, ČSD Class 313.4
  - Class 98.13: BBÖ Class 99, BBÖ Class 199, ČSD Class 320.0, JDŽ 153
  - Class 98.14: BBÖ Class 399
  - Class 98.15: LAG Nos. 50 to 76
  - Class 98.16: Bavarian GtL 4/4 (LAG Nos. 80 and 81)
  - Class 98.17: LAG Nos. 84 to 86
  - Class 98.18: LAG Nos. 87 and 88
  - Class 98.59: locomotive taken over in 1949 by the Deutsche Reichsbahn (GDR)
  - Class 98.60: various locomotives taken over in 1949 by the Deutsche Reichsbahn (GDR)
  - Class 98.61: various locomotives taken over in 1949 by the Deutsche Reichsbahn (GDR)
  - Class 98.62: various locomotives taken over in 1949 by the Deutsche Reichsbahn (GDR)
  - Class 98.63: various locomotives taken over in 1949 by the Deutsche Reichsbahn (GDR)
  - Class 98.64: various locomotives taken over in 1949 by the Deutsche Reichsbahn (GDR)
  - Class 98.70: Saxon VII TS, Saxon VII T
  - Class 98.70: BBÖ Class 96, BBÖ Class 96, ČSD Class 310.0
  - Class 98.70: various locomotives taken over in 1949 by the Deutsche Reichsbahn (GDR)
  - Class 98.71: Saxon VII, LAG Nos. 42 and 43
  - Class 98.72: Saxon IIIb T, LAG Nos. 27 and 28,
  - Class 98.73: Saxon II, LAG Nos. 17 to 49
  - Class 98.74: Oldenburg T 1.2, LAG Nos. 17 to 49
  - Class 98.75: Bavarian D VI
  - Class 98.76: Bavarian D VII, LAG Nos. 9 and 10, LAG Nos. 50 to 76
  - Class 98.77: Bavarian D X
  - Class 98.77^{II}: ČSD Class 300.6, ČSD Class 310.1, ČSD Class 310.8, ČSD Class 311.5
  - Class 98.78: ČSD Class 400.1
  - Class 98.79: BBÖ Class 14
  - Class 98.80: ČSD Class 200.0
