= Class 36 =

Class 36 or 36 class may refer to:

- DRG Class 36, a class of German passenger locomotive with a 4-4-0 wheel arrangement operated by the Deutsche Reichsbahn comprising the:
  - Class 36.0: Prussian P 4
  - Class 36.0-4: Prussian P 4.2
  - Class 36.4-5: LG class K 4.2, PKP Class Od 2
  - Class 36.6: Mecklenburg P 4.2
  - Class 36.7-8: Bavarian B XI
  - Class 36 861: Bavarian P 2/4
  - Class 36.9-10: Saxon VIII V2
  - Class 36.1201-1219: Oldenburg P 4.1,
  - Class 36.1251-1258: Oldenburg P 4.2
  - Class 36.70: Prussian P 4.1
  - Class 36.70^{II}: EWA IIa
- New South Wales 36 class locomotive
