= List of Oldenburg locomotives and railbuses =

Coat of Arms of the Grand Duchy of Oldenburg

This list contains the locomotives and railbuses of the Grand Duchy of Oldenburg State Railways (Großherzoglich Oldenburgische Eisenbahn orGOE).

== Locomotive classification and numbering ==
The locomotives of the Grand Duchy of Oldenburg State Railways were given a name and railway number corresponding to their inventory number, which was allocated in the order in which they were delivered. On retirement, their numbers were not re-used.

The names chosen for locomotives were mainly those of German regions, rivers and towns in the Grand Duchy and the rest of Germany. Names of animals, planets ad figures from Nordic mythology were used. The names of the little tank engines were especially original, intending to describe the way they moved, such as HIN, HER, FLINK, FLOTT (literally: Here, There, Fast and Agile). By contrast, the names of historical people were not used, in order not to "give cause for unnecssary plays on words and connotations". On retirement the spare names were reused for newly delivered locomotives. The GOE held onto the practice of naming locomotives far longer than the other state railways(Länderbahnen); this continued until 1920.

The GOE never introduced formal locomotive classifications. Only in the run up to DRG renumbering were Prussian class designations used in order to simplify the naming and grouping of Oldenburg locomotives. Several locomotive classes that, at the time of the renumbering were already retired, are only referred to by locomotive classes in secondary sources.

== Steam locomotives ==
=== Construction locomotives ===
Class	Railway number(s)	DRG number(s)	Quantity	Year(s) of manufacture	Axle arrangement	Remarks
None	45–46		2	1841	2′A n2	acquired for railway construction in 1866 from the Niederschlesisch-Märkische Eisenbahn or NME; retired 1872

=== Universal locomotives for all types of traffic ===
During the first three decades of its existence, the GOE managed with a locomotive type for all railway services that, in constantly upgraded forms, was re-ordered repeatedly.

Class	Railway number(s)	DRG number(s)	Quantity	Year(s) of manufacture	Axle arrangement	Remarks
G 1	1–26		26	1866–1872	B n2	with frame water tanks; 4 engines partly used as tender locomotives
G 1	27–46	(51 7001–7019)	20	1876–1877	B n2	without frame water tanks
G 1	77–79, 87–91		8	1889–1891	B n2	
P 3^{2} (or P 0)	95–101	(33 7001–7007)	7	1894–1895	B n2v	

=== Passenger and express train locomotives ===
Class	Railway number(s)	DRG number(s)	Quantity	Year(s) of manufacture	Axle arrangement	Remarks
P 4^{1}	107–111, 116, 129–134, 139–144, 150	36 1201–1219	19	1896–1902	2′B n2	
P 4^{2}	174–178, 188–190	36 1251–1258	8	1907–1909	2′B n2v	as Prussian P 4^{2}, Nos. 188–190 with Lentz valve gear
P 8	290–294	38 3390–3394	5	1922	2′C h2	as Prussian P 8
S 3	151–154, 160–161	13 1801–1806	6	1903–1904	2′B n2v	as Prussian S 3
S 5^{2}	205–206, 209–211, 223–225, 248–250	13 1851–1861	11	1909–1913	2′B n2v	as Prussian S 5^{2}, with Lentz valve gear
S 10	266–268	16 001–003	3	1916	1′C1′ h2	

=== Goods train locomotives ===
Class	Railway number(s)	DRG number(s)	Quantity	Year(s) of manufacture	Axle arrangement	Remarks
G 4^{2}	102–106, 117–122, 155–159, 165–166, 179–184, 191–193	53 1001–1003, 53 1051–1058	28	1895–1909	C n2v	as Prussian G 4^{2}
G 7	231–235, 246–247, 251–255, 259–263, 272–276	55 6201–6213	22	1912–1918	D n2v	with Lentz valve gear
G 8^{2}	281–285	56 2276–2280	5	1921	1′D h2	as Prussian G8^{2}, with Lentz valve gear

=== Tank locomotives ===
Class	Railway number(s)	DRG number(s)	Quantity	Year(s) of manufacture	Axle arrangement	Remarks
T 0	63–66, 85–86		6	1885–1891	1A n2t	For omnibus trains
T 1^{2}	47–62		16	1871–1873	B n2t	No. 62 HOLM was built in 1871 for the ELE and acquired by the GOE in 1873
T 1^{2}	67–76, 80–84, 92–94	98 7401–7405	18	1888–1892	B n2t	
T 2	112–115, 147–149, 162–164, 167–173, 197–204, 212–215, 229–230, 237–238, 241–245	98 101–137	38	1896–1913	B n2t	as Prussian T 2
T 3	123–128, 135–138, 145–146, 194–196	(98 201–215)	15	1898–1909	C n2t	as Prussian T 3
T 5^{1}	185–187, 207–208, 216–218, 226–228, 236, 256–258, 269–271, 279–280	71 401–71 420	20	1907–1921	1′B1 n2t	as Prussian T 5^{1}
T 13	219–222, 239–240, 264–265, 277–278	92 585–588, 92 606–607, 92 910–913	10	1911–1919	D n2t	as Prussian T 13
T 13^{1}	286–289	92 401–404	4	1921	D h2t	with Lentz valve gear

=== Narrow gauge locomotives ===
The GOE's narrow gauge locomotives were procured for working the metre gauge line on the island railway on Wangerooge.

Class	Railway number(s)	DRG number(s)	Quantity	Year(s) of manufacture	Axle arrangement	Remarks
(B)	1		1	1896	B n2t	Built by Orenstein & Koppel
(B)	2		1	1898	B n2t	Built by Maschinenfabrik Heilbronn, sold in 1904
(B)	3	99 021	1	1904	B n2t	Built by Freudenstein
(B)	4–5	99 022–023	2	1910–1913	B n2t	Built by Hanomag

== Railbuses ==
Class	Railway number(s)	DRG number(s)	Quantity	Year(s) of manufacture	Axle arrangement	Remarks
none			1	1910	2′Bo′ pe	Benzol-electric railbus, retired in 1915

== See also ==
- History of rail transport in Germany
- Grand Duchy of Oldenburg
- Grand Duchy of Oldenburg State Railways
- Länderbahnen
- UIC classification
