= Oldenburg G 7 =

Oldenburg G 7 DRG Class 55.62
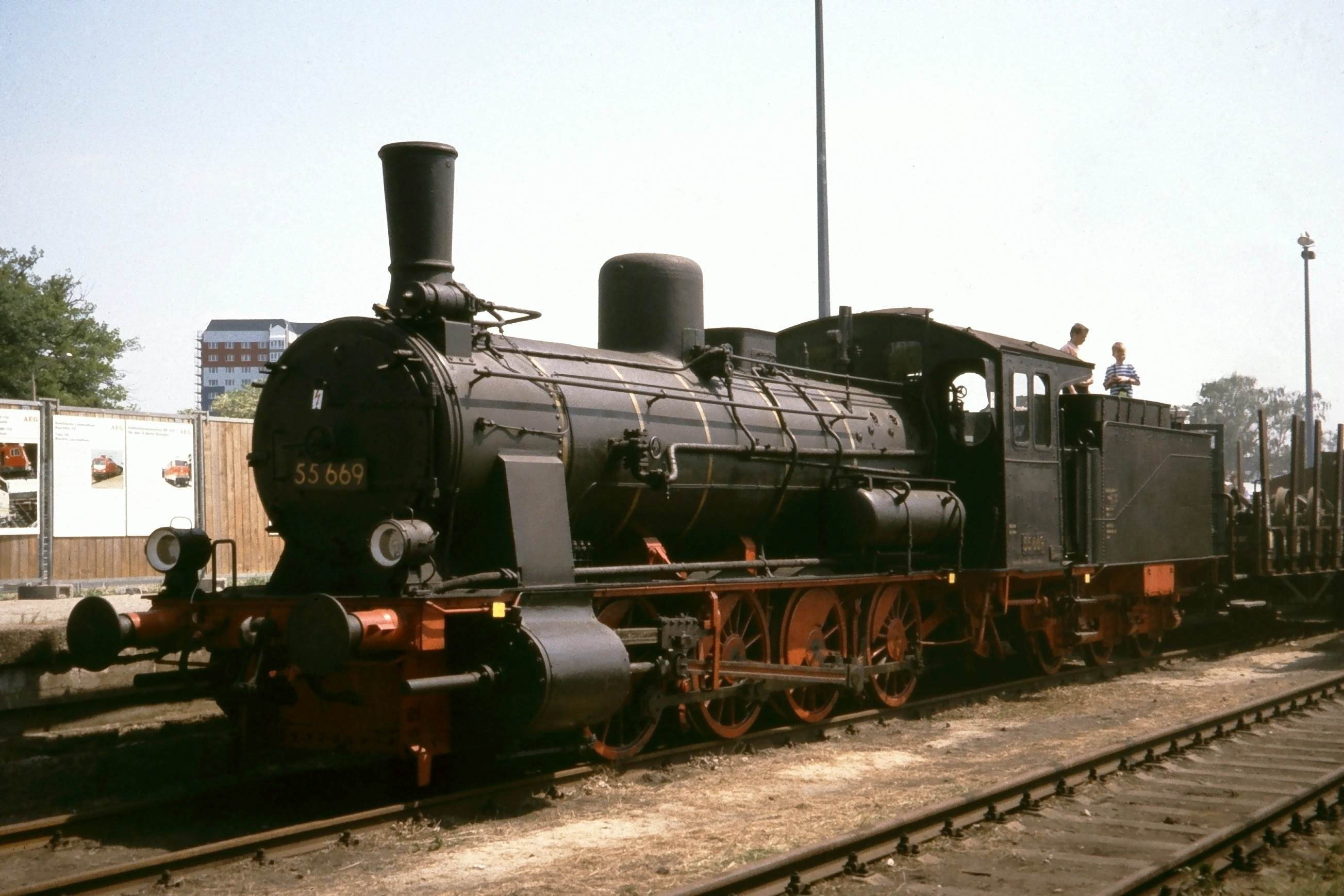
- An ex-Prussian G 7.1, no. 55 669, in Potsdam on 17 May 1993
Type and origin
- Build date: 1912–1918
- Total produced: 22
Specifications
- Configuration
  - Whyte: 0-8-0
- Driver dia.: 1,350 mm (4 ft 5 in)
- Adhesive weight: 58.6 t (57.7 long tons; 64.6 short tons)
- Service weight: 58.6 t (57.7 long tons; 64.6 short tons)
- Boiler pressure: 12 kgf/cm^{2} (1.18 MPa; 171 lbf/in^{2})
- Heating surface
  - Firebox: 2.23 m^{2} (24.0 sq ft)
  - Evaporative: 180.10 m^{2} (1,938.6 sq ft)
- Cylinders: 2, compound
- High-pressure cylinder: 500 mm (19 11/16 in)
- Low-pressure cylinder: 750 mm (29 1/2 in)
- Piston stroke: 660 mm (26 in)
Performance figures
- Maximum speed: 45 km/h (28 mph)
Career
- Numbers: GOE: 231–235, 246–247, 251–255, 259–263, 272–276; DRG: 55 6201–6213

The Oldenburg G 7 steam locomotive was a class of German 0-8-0 locomotives produced for the Grand Duchy of Oldenburg State Railways (Großherzoglich Oldenburgische Eisenbahn). It was an eight-coupled engine, intended for heavy goods train duties, and was based on the Prussian G 7. It had a 1,660 mm diameter boiler located 2,820 mm above the top of the rails in the plate frame, and was equipped with a single Walschaerts valve gear as well as a Lentz valve gear. Thirteen were taken over by the Deutsche Reichsbahn, classified as DRG Class 55.62 and numbered 55 6201–55 6213.

== See also ==
- Grand Duchy of Oldenburg State Railways
- List of Oldenburg locomotives and railbuses
- Länderbahnen
