= Oldenburg S 5 =

Oldenburg S 5 DRG Class 13.18
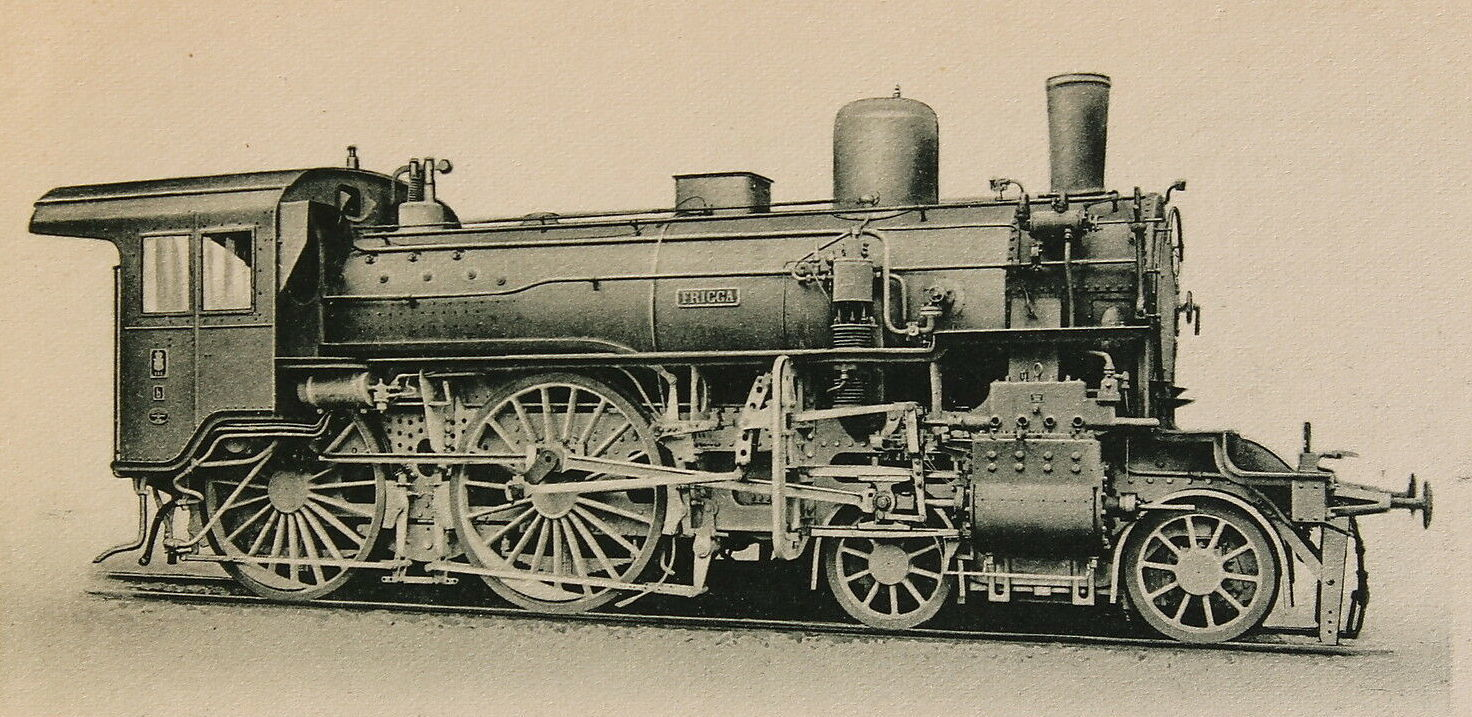
- Factory image of Hanomag
Type and origin
- Builder: Hanomag
- Build date: 1909-1913
- Total produced: 11
Specifications
- Configuration
  - Whyte: 4-4-0
- Gauge: 1,435 mm (4 ft 8 1/2 in)
- Leading dia.: 1,000 mm (39 3/8 in)
- Driver dia.: 1,980 mm (78 in)
- Length
  - Over beams: 17,661 mm (57 ft 11 1/4 in)
- Axle load: 16.0 t (15.7 long tons; 17.6 short tons)
- Adhesive weight: 32.0 t (31.5 long tons; 35.3 short tons)
- Service weight: 53.4 t (52.6 long tons; 58.9 short tons)
- Water cap.: 20 m^{3} (4,400 imp gal; 5,300 US gal)
- Heating surface
  - Firebox: 2.27 m^{2} (24.4 sq ft)
  - Evaporative: 140.77 m^{2} (1,515.2 sq ft)
- Cylinders: 2
- High-pressure cylinder: 475 mm (18 11/16 in)
- Low-pressure cylinder: 700 mm (27 9/16 in)
- Piston stroke: 600 mm (23 5/8 in)
Performance figures
- Maximum speed: 100 km/h (62 mph)
Career
- Numbers: GOE: 205–206, 209–211, 223–225, 248–250; DRG: 13 1851–1861
- Retired: 1927

The Oldenburg Class S 5 steam engine was a German locomotive built for the Grand Duchy of Oldenburg State Railways (Großherzoglich Oldenburgische Staatseisenbahnen) between 1909 and 1913. It was based on the Prussian S 5.2 and, like its predecessor, the Class S 3, it was procured for the route between Wilhelmshaven, Oldenburg and Bremen.

Eleven engines were manufactured by Hanomag between 1909 and 1913. They differed in several technical points from their Prussian cousins, for example they had a Lentz valve gear. Even the running plate was higher than the Prussian S 5.2 so that wheel arches could be omitted. They had Ranafier starting equipment.

The locomotives were given the names of German divinities. The Deutsche Reichsbahn took over all eleven engines, classifying them as DRG Class 13.18 and allocating them numbers 13 1851 to 13 1861. They were retired by 1927.

== See also ==
- Grand Duchy of Oldenburg State Railways
- List of Oldenburg locomotives and railbuses
- Länderbahnen

== Bibliography ==
- Hütter, Ingo (2009). Die Dampflokomotiven der Baureihen 01 bis 45 der DRG, DRB, DB, und DR (in German). Werl: DGEG Medien. p. 135. ISBN 978-3-937189-45-1.
- Spielhoff, Lothar (1990). Länderbahn-Dampf-Lokomotiven. Band 1: Preußen, Mecklenburg, Oldenburg, Sachsen und Elsaß-Lothringen (in German). Stuttgart: Franckh'sche Verlagshandlung. ISBN 3-440-06145-0.
- Weisbrod, Manfred; Müller, Hans; Petznik, Wolfgang (1976). Dampflokomotiven deutscher Eisenbahnen, Baureihe 01–39 (EFA 1.1) (in German) (3rd ed.). Düsseldorf: Alba Buchverlag. pp. 79–80. ISBN 3-87094-081-6.
