= Oldenburg S 10 =

Oldenburg S 10 DRG Class 16
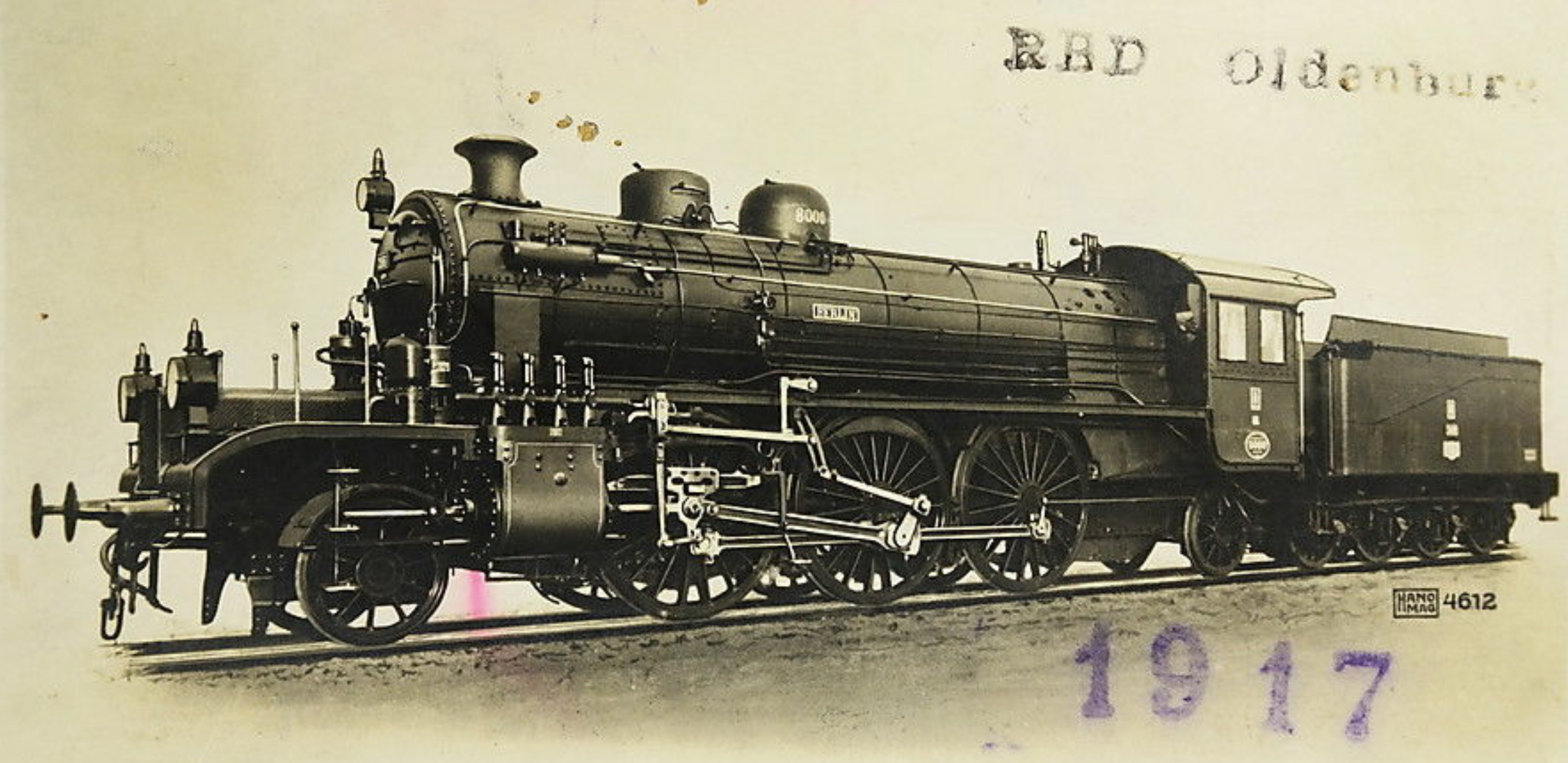
- Engine No. 266 Berlin, later 16 001
Type and origin
- Builder: Hanomag
- Build date: 1917
- Total produced: 3
Specifications
- Configuration
  - Whyte: 2-6-2
  - German: S 35.15
- Leading dia.: 1,100 mm (43 1/4 in)
- Driver dia.: 1,980 mm (78 in)
- Trailing dia.: 1,100 mm (43 1/4 in)
- Length
  - Over beams: 20,650 mm (67 ft 9 in) (incl. tender)
- Axle load: 15.1 tonnes (14.9 long tons; 16.6 short tons)
- Adhesive weight: 45.4 t (44.7 long tons; 50.0 short tons)
- Service weight: 73.9 t (72.7 long tons; 81.5 short tons)
- Boiler pressure: 14 kgf/cm^{2} (1.37 MPa; 199 lbf/in^{2})
- Heating surface
  - Firebox: 3.00 m^{2} (32.3 sq ft)
  - Evaporative: 145.88 m^{2} (1,570.2 sq ft)
- Superheater
  - Heating area: 41.20 m^{2} (443.5 sq ft)
- Cylinder size: 580 mm (22 13/16 in)
- Piston stroke: 630 mm (24 13/16 in)
Performance figures
- Maximum speed: 100 km/h (62 mph)
- Indicated power: 1,130 PS (831 kW; 1,110 hp)
Career
- Numbers: GOE: 266 Berlin, 267 München, 268 Dresden; DRG 16 001–003
- Retired: 1926

The express train locomotives of Oldenburg Class S 10 were built for the Grand Duchy of Oldenburg State Railways for duties on the Bremen–Oldenburg–Wilhelmshaven line, which was the most important express route in Oldenburg. They were amongst the few locomotives of this railway company that were not based on those of the Prussian state railways, because the light railway track dictated that they had to have an average axle load of no more than 15 t which was lower than that on comparable Prussian vehicles.

The three vehicles of this class were built by Hanomag from 1917 and had a 2-6-2 (Prairie) wheel arrangement which was rare for Germany. They had Lentz valve gear which was typical of Oldenburg. The engines had an uneven distribution of load, however, as well as poor riding qualities and were often bedevilled with boiler problems. In addition, an incorrect matching of the radiative and tube heating areas led to leaks in sides of the tubes.

The three S 10 engines were grouped by the Deutsche Reichsbahn into Class 16 with operating numbers 16 001–16 003. They were the only express train locomotives with a 2-6-2 wheel arrangement and therefore had their own class. After the lines were upgraded to 17 tonnes axle load, the temperamental S 10s were retired by 1926 and replaced by Prussian P 8s that had been employed in Oldenburg since 1921.

The locomotives were coupled with Oldenburg class 2'2' T 20 tenders.

== See also ==
- Grand Duchy of Oldenburg State Railways
- List of Oldenburg locomotives and railbuses
- Länderbahnen
