= Oldenburg T 3 =

Oldenburg T 3 DRG Class 98.2
Type and origin
- Builder: Hanomag
- Build date: 1898–1909
- Total produced: 15
Specifications
- Configuration
  - Whyte: 0-6-0T
- Gauge: 1,435 mm (4 ft 8 1/2 in)
- Driver dia.: 1,100 mm (3 ft 7 1/4 in)
- Length
  - Over beams: 8,300 mm (27 ft 2 3/4 in)
- Axle load: 10.8 t (10.6 long tons; 11.9 short tons)
- Adhesive weight: 32.36 t (31.85 long tons; 35.67 short tons)
- Service weight: 32.36 t (31.85 long tons; 35.67 short tons)
- Boiler pressure: 12 kgf/cm^{2} (1.18 MPa; 171 lbf/in^{2})
- Heating surface
  - Firebox: 1.35 or 1.00 m^{2} (14.5 or 10.8 sq ft)
  - Evaporative: 59.10 or 57.20 m^{2} (636.1 or 615.7 sq ft)
- Cylinder size: 556 mm (21 7/8 in)
- Piston stroke: 340 mm (13 3/8 in)
- Loco brake: Compressed-air brake; Heberlein brake
Performance figures
- Maximum speed: 45 km/h (28 mph)
Career
- Numbers: GOE: 123–128, 135–138, 145–146, 194–196; DRG: 98 201–215; DR: 89 7577
- Retired: 1926

The Class T 3s of the Grand Duchy of Oldenburg State Railways were tank locomotives for duties on local and branch lines. They were broadly similar to the Prussian T 3. In terms of performance they were no different from the Oldenburg T 2; but the T 3 had a lower axle load and a somewhat higher adhesive weight of 4.4 tonnes.

12 locomotives were delivered by Hanomag between 1898 and 1901. In 1909 another three engines were supplied, that were only intended for shunting duties. They had a grate area of 1.0 m^{2}, a heating area of 57.2 m^{2} and were not fitted with Heberlein brakes.

In 1925 the Deutsche Reichsbahn took over all 15 locomotives, grouped them into DRG Class 98.2 and gave them numbers 98 201 to 98 215. They were retired by 1926.

In 1945 the former 98 210 was taken over by the Deutsche Reichsbahn (GDR) as a works engine and was given the number 89 7577. It was retired in 1961.

== See also ==
- Grand Duchy of Oldenburg State Railways
- List of Oldenburg locomotives and railbuses
- Länderbahnen
