= Oldenburg P 4.2 =

German steam locomotives

Oldenburg P 4.2 DRG Class 36.12
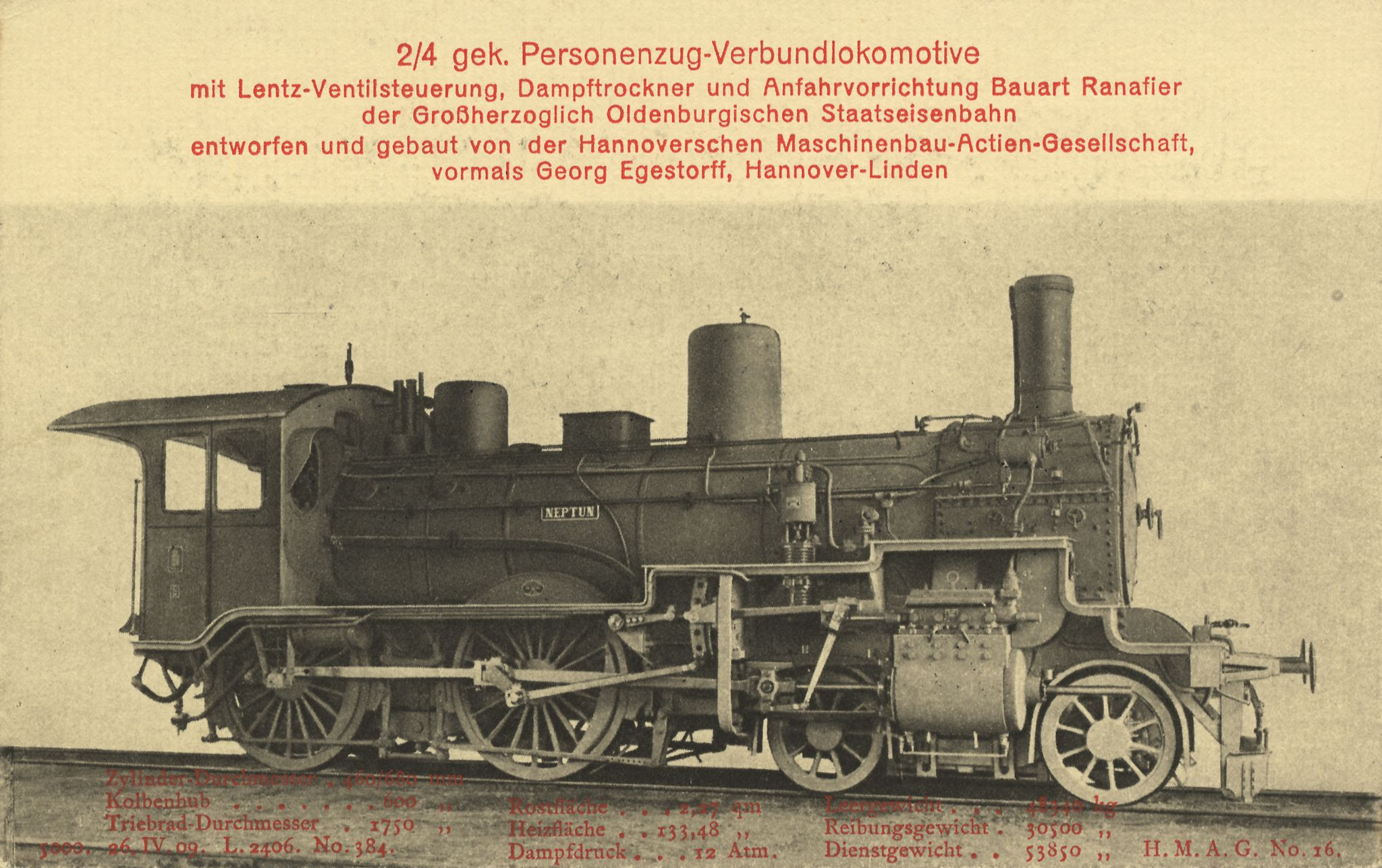
- Locomotive 190 Neptun (Hanomag 5410 of 1909)
Type and origin
- Builder: Hanomag
- Build date: 1907–1909
- Total produced: 8
Specifications
- Configuration
  - Whyte: 4-4-0
- Gauge: 1,435 mm (4 ft 8 1/2 in)
- Leading dia.: 1,000 mm (39 3/8 in)
- Driver dia.: 1,750 mm (68 7/8 in)
- Length
  - Over beams: 17,461 mm (57 ft 3 1/2 in)
- Axle load: 15.1 t (14.9 long tons; 16.6 short tons)
- Adhesive weight: 30.2 t (29.7 long tons; 33.3 short tons)
- Service weight: 52.2 t (51.4 long tons; 57.5 short tons)
- Water cap.: 16.0 m^{3} (3,500 imp gal; 4,200 US gal)
- Heating surface
  - Firebox: 2.27 m^{2} (24.4 sq ft)
  - Evaporative: 119.35 m^{2} (1,284.7 sq ft)
- Cylinders: 2
- High-pressure cylinder: 460 mm (18 1/8 in)
- Low-pressure cylinder: 680 mm (26 3/4 in)
- Piston stroke: 600 mm (23 5/8 in)
Performance figures
- Maximum speed: 90 km/h (56 mph)
- Indicated power: 427 kW (581 PS; 573 hp)
Career
- Numbers: GOE: 174–178, 188–190; DRG: 36 1251 - 36 1258
- Retired: 1929

The Oldenburg Class P 4.2 were German steam locomotives built for the Grand Duchy of Oldenburg State Railways (Großherzoglich Oldenburgische Staatseisenbahnen) between 1907 and 1909. They were based on the standard variant of the Prussian P 4.2, with small differences such as a Ranafier steam dryer and, on three examples, a Lentz valve gear, a system widely used in Oldenburg. Production began in 1907 and eight locomotives were procured up to 1909.

The locomotives taken over by the Deutsche Reichsbahn were grouped as DRG Class 36.12 and were given numbers 36 1251 to 36 1258.

The locomotives used tenders of the 3 T 12 or 2'2' T 20 classes.

== See also ==
- Grand Duchy of Oldenburg State Railways
- List of Oldenburg locomotives and railbuses
- Länderbahnen

== Sources ==
- Hütter, Ingo (2009). Die Dampflokomotiven der Baureihen 01 bis 45 der DRG, DRB, DB, und DR (in German). Werl: DGEG Medien. p. 291. ISBN 978-3-937189-45-1.
- Spielhoff, Lothar (1990). Länderbahn-Dampf-Lokomotiven. Band 1: Preußen, Mecklenburg, Oldenburg, Sachsen und Elsaß-Lothringen (in German). Stuttgart: Franckh'sche Verlagshandlung. ISBN 3-440-06145-0.
- Weisbrod, Manfred; Müller, Hans; Petznik, Wolfgang (1976). Dampflokomotiven deutscher Eisenbahnen, Baureihe 01–39 (EFA 1.1) (in German) (3rd ed.). Düsseldorf: Alba Buchverlag. pp. 203–205. ISBN 3-87094-081-6.
