= Class 13 =

Class 13 may refer to:

- A13-class container ship
- British Rail Class 13, diesel locomotives
- Belgian Railways Class 13 electric locomotives
- EAR 13 class, steam locomotives
- The DRG Class 13, a German steam locomotive class. Within this class the Deutsche Reichsbahn incorporated former state railway tender locomotives with a 4-4-0 wheel arrangement.
  - Class 13.0: Prussian S 3
  - Class 13.0^{II}: LBE S 5, PKP Class Pd4 (Prussian S 5.2)
  - Class 13.1: BBÖ 106 (PKP class Pd13), BBÖ 206 (PKP Class Pd14)
  - Class 13.2: BBÖ 306
  - Class 13.3: PKP Class Pd1, LG class K3 (Prussian S 5.2, Prussian S 3)
  - Class 13.4: PKP Class Pd2 (Prussian S 4)
  - Class 13.5: Prussian S 4, PKP Class Pd5
  - Class 13.5^{II}: PKP Class Pd5 (Prussian S 6)
  - Class 13.6–8: Prussian S 5.2
  - Class 13.10-12: Prussian S 6
  - Class 13.15: Saxon VIII V1
  - Class 13.16: Württemberg AD
  - Class 13.17: Württemberg ADh
  - Class 13.18: Oldenburg S 3 and Oldenburg S 5
  - Class 13.70: Saxon VIII 2
  - Class 13.71: Saxon VIII V1
- GNR Class J13, steam locomotives
- I-13-class submarine
- LSWR F13 class, steam locomotives
- MK13-class missile boat
- New South Wales Z13 class locomotive, steam locomotives
- No.13-class submarine chaser
- Number 13-class battleship
- Ro-13-class submarine
- South African Class NG G13 2-6-2+2-6-2, steam locomotives
- VR Class Dr13, diesel locomotives
- W-13-class minesweeper

== See also ==
- Type 13 (disambiguation)
