= Oldenburg S 3 =

Oldenburg S 3 DRG Class 13.18
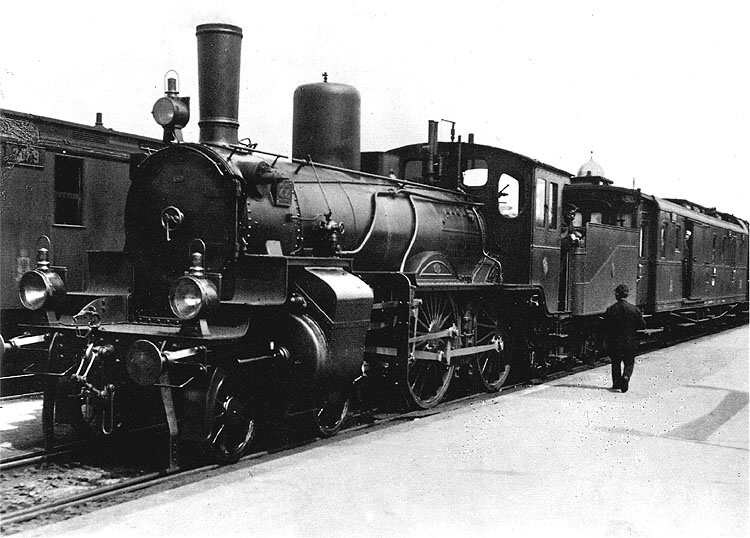
- Prussian S3 photographed in 1895 at Berlin-Charlottenburg
Type and origin
- Builder: Hanomag
- Build date: 1903–1904
- Total produced: 6
Specifications
- Configuration
  - Whyte: 4-4-0
  - German: Express train locomotive
- Leading dia.: 1,000 mm (39 3/8 in)
- Driver dia.: 1,980 mm (78 in)
- Length
  - Over beams: 17,461 mm (57 ft 3 1/2 in)
- Axle load: 15.0 t (14.8 long tons; 16.5 short tons)
- Adhesive weight: 30.2 t (29.7 long tons; 33.3 short tons)
- Service weight: 52.2 t (51.4 long tons; 57.5 short tons)
- Boiler pressure: 12 kgf/cm^{2} (1,180 kPa; 171 lbf/in^{2})
- Heating surface
  - Firebox: 2.27 m^{2} (24.4 sq ft)
  - Evaporative: 119.4 m^{2} (1,285 sq ft)
- Cylinders: Two, compound
- High-pressure cylinder: 460 mm (18 1/8 in)
- Low-pressure cylinder: 680 mm (26 3/4 in)
- Piston stroke: 630 mm (24 13/16 in)
Performance figures
- Maximum speed: 95 km/h (59 mph)
Career
- Numbers: GOE: 151–154, 160, 161; DRG: 13 1801–1806
- Retired: 1927

The Oldenburg Class S 3 was a German steam locomotive built for the Grand Duchy of Oldenburg State Railways (Großherzoglich Oldenburgische Staatseisenbahnen) in 1903 and 1904. It was based on a Prussian prototype, the Prussian S 3 (see photo), and procured for the route between Wilhelmshaven, Oldenburg and Bremen. It was the first express train engine built for the Oldenburg state railways and also the first one fitted with a steam dome. It replaced the old P 4 passenger train locomotives.

Six engines were built by Hanomag in 1903 and 1904 with numbers 151–154, 160 and 161. They differed in several technical details from their Prussian counterparts, but did not have Lentz valve gear which, later, became common throughout Oldenburg.

The Deutsche Reichsbahn took over all six locomotives and grouped them into DRG Class 13.18, allocating them the numbers 13 1801 to 13 1806. They were retired by 1927.

== See also ==
- Grand Duchy of Oldenburg State Railways
- List of Oldenburg locomotives and railbuses
- Länderbahnen
