= Oldenburg T 0 =

Type and origin
- Build date: 1885–1891
Specifications
- Configuration
  - Whyte: 2-2-0T
  - German: Goods train tank locomotive
- Gauge: 1,435 mm (4 ft 8 1/2 in)
- Leading dia.: 1,000 mm (3 ft 3 3/8 in)
- Driver dia.: 1,210 mm (3 ft 11 5/8 in)
- Axle load: 9.2 t (9.1 long tons; 10.1 short tons)
- Service weight: 17.6 t (17.3 long tons; 19.4 short tons)
- Boiler pressure: 12 kg/cm^{2} (1.18 MPa; 171 lbf/in^{2})
- Heating surface
  - Firebox: 0.52 m^{2} (5.6 sq ft)
  - Evaporative: 28.2 m^{2} (304 sq ft)
- Cylinder size: 220 mm (8 11/16 in)
- Piston stroke: 440 mm (17 5/16 in)
Performance figures
- Maximum speed: 60 km/h (37 mph)
Career
- Retired: around 1920

The Oldenburg Class T 0 (originally Class VIII) were goods train tank engines operated by the Grand Duchy of Oldenburg State Railways. They were built specifically for branch lines, because four-coupled engines had proved uneconomical. Their wheelbase of 3.7 m (12 ft 2 in) enabled them to travel at up to 60 km/h (37 mph). They were considerably more economical than the four-couplers. In 1885 four were built and two more followed in 1891.

== See also ==
- Grand Duchy of Oldenburg State Railways
- List of Oldenburg locomotives and railbuses

== Sources ==
- Lothar Spielhoff (1990), Länderbahn-Dampf-Lokomotiven. Band 1: Preußen, Mecklenburg, Oldenburg, Sachsen und Elsaß-Lothringen (in German), Stuttgart: Franckh'sche Verlagshandlung, ISBN 3-440-06145-0
