= Class 51 =

Class 51 may refer to:

- Belgian Railways Class 51
- DRG Class 51 a German class of steam freight locomotives
  - Class 51.0: ČSD Class 623.0
  - Class 51.7: Oldenburg G 1
- EAR 51 class - former KUR EC1 class
- LT&SR 51 Class
