= Oldenburg P 4.1 =

Oldenburg P 4.1 DRG Class 36.12
Type and origin
- Builder: Hanomag
- Build date: 1896–1902
- Total produced: 19
Specifications
- Configuration
  - Whyte: 4-4-0
  - German: P 24.14
- Gauge: 1,435 mm (4 ft 8 1/2 in)
- Leading dia.: 1,000 mm (3 ft 3 3/8 in)
- Driver dia.: 1,750 mm (5 ft 8 7/8 in)
- Wheelbase
  - Overall: 6,300 mm (20 ft 8 in)
  - incl. tender: 12,075 mm (39 ft 7 1/2 in)
- Length
  - Over beams: 15,263 mm (50 ft 1 in)
- Height: 4,225 mm (13 ft 10 3/8 in)
- Axle load: 13.7 t (13.5 long tons; 15.1 short tons)
- Adhesive weight: 27.4 t (27.0 long tons; 30.2 short tons)
- Empty weight: 40.0 t (39.4 long tons; 44.1 short tons)
- Service weight: 45.2 t (44.5 long tons; 49.8 short tons)
- Fuel capacity: 4 t (8,800 lb) coal
- Water cap.: 12 m^{3} (2,600 imp gal; 3,200 US gal)
- Boiler
- No. of heating tubes: 248
- Heating tube length: 3,650 mm (11 ft 11 3/4 in)
- Boiler pressure: 12 kgf/cm^{2} (1,180 kPa; 171 lbf/in^{2})
- Heating surface
  - Firebox: 1.92 m^{2} (20.7 sq ft)
  - Radiative: 8.72 m^{2} (93.9 sq ft)
  - Tubes: 110.75 m^{2} (1,192.1 sq ft)
  - Evaporative: 119.47 m^{2} (1,286.0 sq ft)
- Cylinders: 2
- Cylinder size: 460 mm (18 1/8 in)
- Piston stroke: 600 mm (23 5/8 in)
- Valve gear: Walschaerts (Heusinger )
Performance figures
- Maximum speed: 90 km/h (56 mph)
Career
- Numbers: GOE: 107–111, 116, 129–134, 139–144, 150; DRG: 36 1201 – 36 1219
- Retired: 1925–1931

The steam locomotives of Oldenburg Class P 4.1 (later DRG Class 36.12) were German locomotives built for the Grand Duchy of Oldenburg State Railways (Großherzoglich Oldenburgische Staatseisenbahnen) between 1896 and 1902. They were based on a Prussian P 4.1 prototype and a total of 19 engines were procured up to 1902. Overall the Oldenburg engine was less powerful than its Prussian counterpart, because the grate area was smaller and the steam dome was omitted. The regulators were housed in the smokebox. The Deutsche Reichsbahn took over the locomotives in 1920 and allocated them numbers 36 1201 to 36 1219. They were retired in the 1930s.

They were coupled with tenders of class 3 T 12.

== See also ==
- Grand Duchy of Oldenburg State Railways
- List of Oldenburg locomotives and railbuses
- Länderbahnen
