= Oldenburg G 1 =

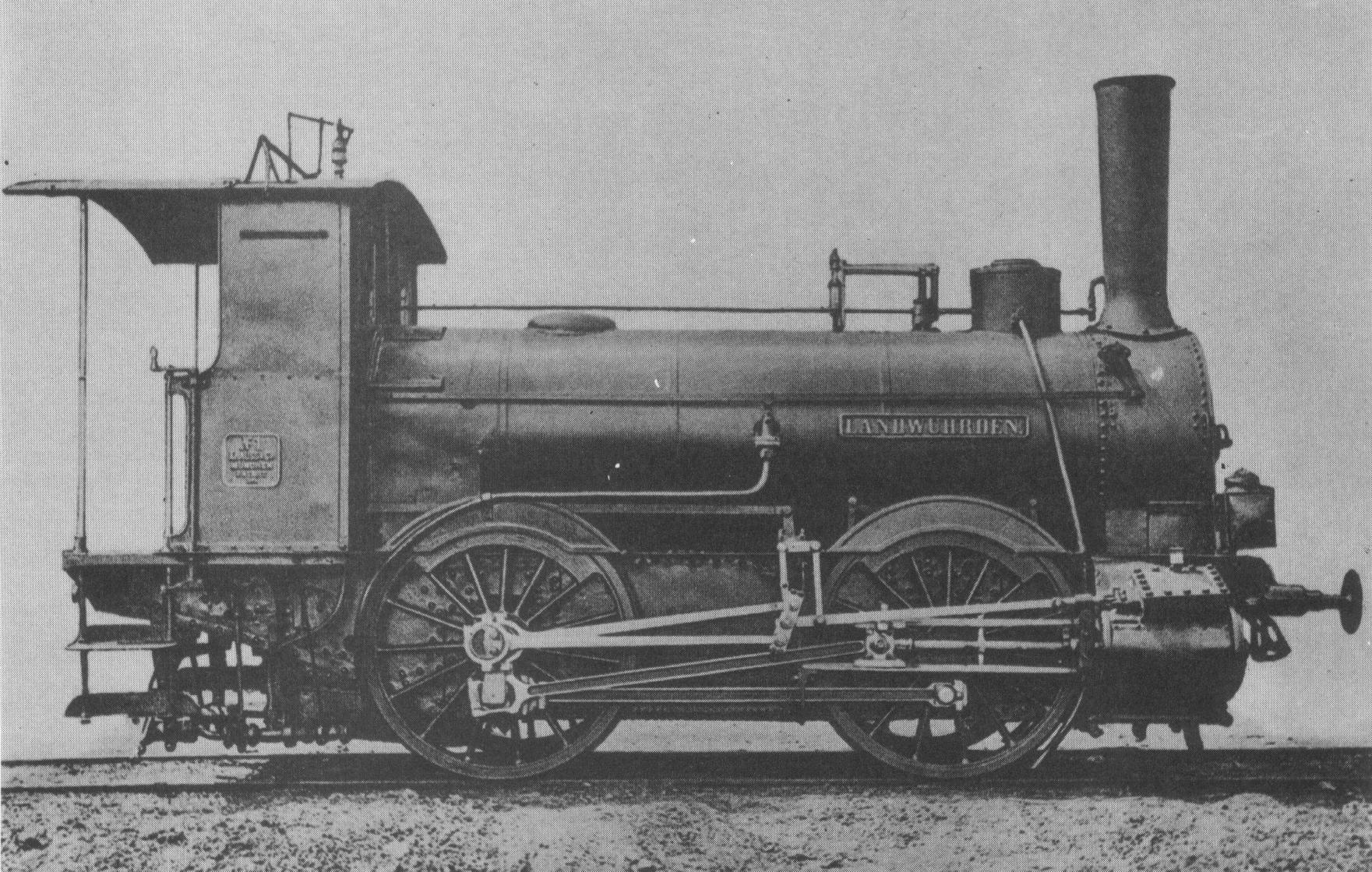
- The Class G 1 locomotive, "Landwührden"
Type and origin
- Builder: Krauss inter alia
- Build date: 1867–1877
Specifications
- Configuration
  - Whyte: 0-4-0
  - German: Goods train locomotive
- Gauge: 1,435 mm (4 ft 8 1/2 in) standard gauge
- Driver dia.: 1,500 mm (4 ft 11 in)
- Adhesive weight: 21.3 t (21.0 long tons; 23.5 short tons)
- Service weight: 21.3 t (21.0 long tons; 23.5 short tons)
- Boiler pressure: 10 kgf/cm^{2} (981 kPa; 142 lbf/in^{2})
- Heating surface
  - Firebox: 0.95 m^{2} (10.2 sq ft)
  - Evaporative: 75.0 m^{2} (807 sq ft)
- Cylinder size: 355 mm (14 in)
- Piston stroke: 560 mm (22 1/16 in)
- Valve gear: Allan
Performance figures
- Maximum speed: 45 km/h (28 mph)
Career
- Numbers: 46
- Retired: 1925

The Oldenburg Class G1s were German steam locomotives procured by the Grand Duchy of Oldenburg State Railways (Großherzoglich Oldenburgische Staatseisenbahnen) from 1867 to 1877. They were intended to work both as tank engines and with a tender.

== Design ==
The G1 class were 0-4-0 locomotives, a configuration chosen for its simplicity and inexpensive construction. It had horizontal outside cylinders and a number of original design features, including a radially-stayed, round-top firebox and a small 'regulator box' that replaced the usual steam dome.

The locomotive frame was designed as a box with riveted steel plates that enabled it to double up as a feedwater tank, an arrangement known as the Krauss system. It had an Allan valve gear. The connecting and coupling rods were made of fluted I-section steel, the first time such a form had been used, although Belpaire in Belgium was developing the same idea, independently, at the time.

== The first engine, Landwührden ==
At the world exhibition in Paris in 1867 the first locomotive, named Landwührden (see table photo), won a gold medal for workmanship excellence and design. This engine - which was also the first one built by Georg Krauss of Munich and therefore had the works number 1 – was withdrawn from service in 1900 and may be viewed today in the Deutsches Museum in Munich. It is the only surviving locomotive from the Grand Duchy of Oldenburg State Railways.

== Retirement ==
Nineteen of the engines were to have been taken over by the Deutsche Reichsbahn as DRG Class 51.70, but this did not happen because by the time the final renumbering plan was drawn up in 1925, all the locomotives had been retired.

== Importance ==
According to Ransome-Wallis, "there is no doubt that this locomotive was, in many ways, an important 'landmark' in the history of locomotive development in Europe."

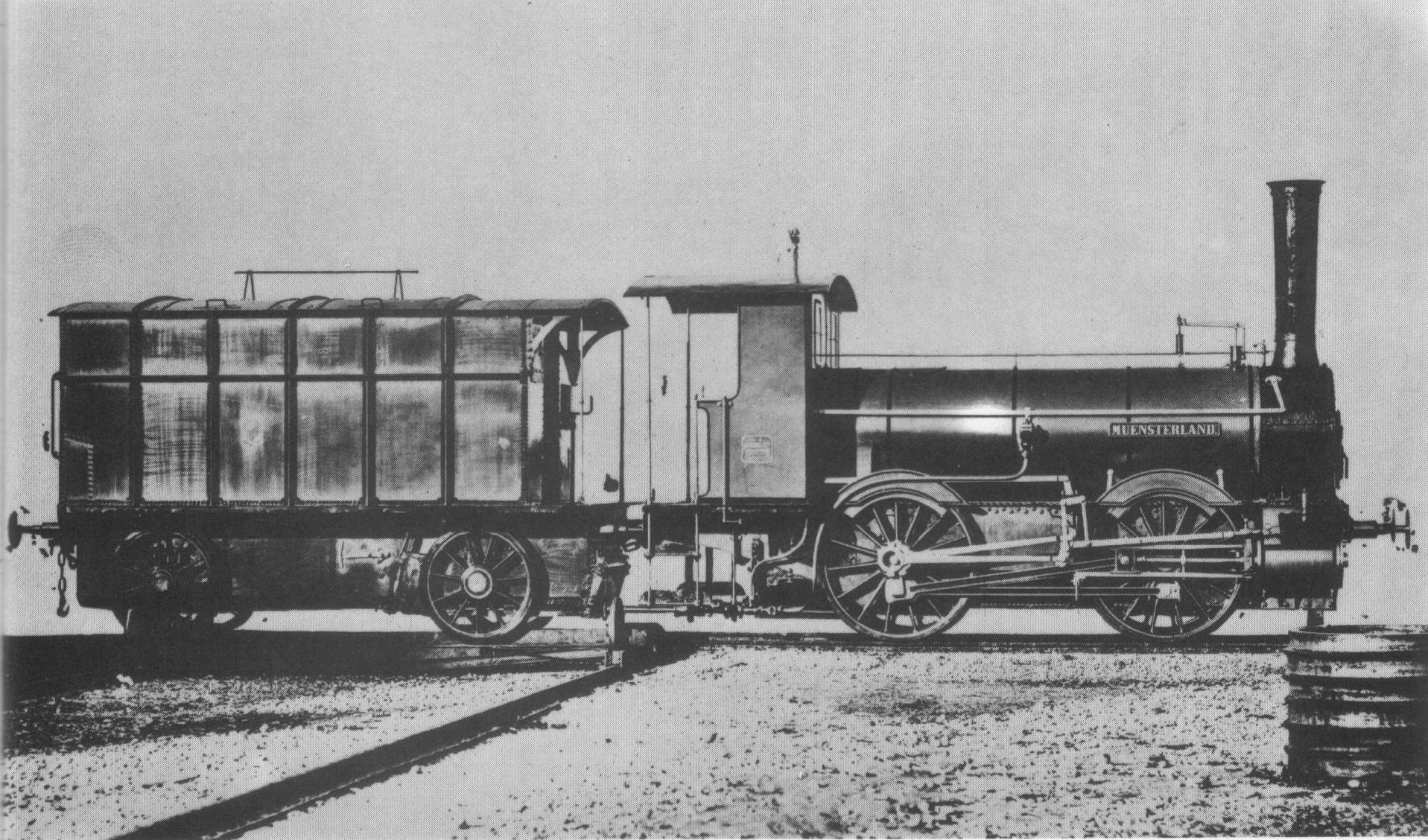
"Münsterland" with a peat tender

== See also ==
- Grand Duchy of Oldenburg State Railways
- List of Oldenburg locomotives and railbuses
- Länderbahnen
