= Oldenburg T 1 =

The Oldenburg Class T 1 was an early German locomotive operated by the Grand Duchy of Oldenburg State Railways. It was a four-coupled tank locomotive for shunting duties. There were two types, of which the later one entered the Deutsche Reichsbahn fleet and became Class 98.74.

== T 1 ==
The first variant, called the T 1, emerged from a joint project with the firm of Krauss in their railway company's own workshop. The 12 locomotives built between 1871 and 1873 belonged to the few engines that were developed specifically for the Oldenburg railways. They had a boiler pressure of 98.1 kN and maximum permitted speed of 40 km/h.

These engines had already been retired on the formation of the Deutsche Reichsbahn.

== T 1.2 ==
Oldenburg T 1.2 DRG Class 98.74
Type and origin
- Builder: Hohenzollern AG
- Build date: 1888–1892
- Total produced: 18
Specifications
- Gauge: 1,435 mm (4 ft 8 1/2 in)
- Driver dia.: 1,130 mm (3 ft 8 1/2 in)
- Length
  - Over beams: 6,700 mm (21 ft 11 3/4 in)
- Axle load: 9.61 t (9.46 long tons; 10.59 short tons)
- Adhesive weight: 19.03 t (18.73 long tons; 20.98 short tons)
- Service weight: 19.03 t (18.73 long tons; 20.98 short tons)
- Boiler pressure: 12 kg/cm^{2} (1.18 MPa; 171 lbf/in^{2})
- Heating surface
  - Firebox: 0.59 m^{2} (6.4 sq ft)
  - Evaporative: 26.00 m^{2} (279.9 sq ft)
- Cylinder size: 255 mm (10 1/16 in)
- Piston stroke: 500 mm (19 11/16 in)
Performance figures
- Maximum speed: 45 km/h (28 mph)
Career
- Numbers: GOE: 67–76, 80–84, 92–94; DRG: 98 7401–7405
- Retired: 1933

Between 1888 and 1892 the Oldenburg State Railways acquired another 18 locomotives, which were grouped into Class T 1^{2}. This time it was not built by them, the locomotives were supplied by Hohenzollern AG. They were however designed specially for the Oldenburg railways.

Unlike the earlier version, these engines had a 2 bar higher boiler pressure and larger coupled wheel and cylinder diameters. In addition the top speed was not 45 km/h. An unusual feature was the driver's cab roof, that was rounded front and back and not, as was then common, at the sides.

Five examples were taken over by the Deutsche Reichsbahn as 98 7401–98 7405. The last two engines were retired by 1933.

== See also ==
- Grand Duchy of Oldenburg State Railways
- List of Oldenburg locomotives and railbuses
