= Type 13 =

Type 13 may refer to:

- Bugatti Type 13, the first real Bugatti car
- Spinocerebellar ataxia type-13, a rare autosomal dominant disorder
- Murata Type 13 rifle, a rifle of the Imperial Japanese Army - see Murata rifle
- Mitsubishi Navy Type 13 Carrier Attack Bomber, a Japanese torpedo bomber
- Bristol Type 13 MR.1, an experimental biplane produced by Bristol

== See also ==
- Class 13 (disambiguation)
