= Prussian G 8.2 =

The Prussian G 8.2 class of locomotives actually incorporated two different locomotive types: one was the Prussian/Oldenburg G 8.2, for which the Deutsche Reichsbahn subsequently issued follow-on orders; the other was the G 8.2 of the Lübeck-Büchen Railway.

== Prussian G 8.2 ==
Prussian G 8.2 DRG Class 56.20–29 PKP Tr6
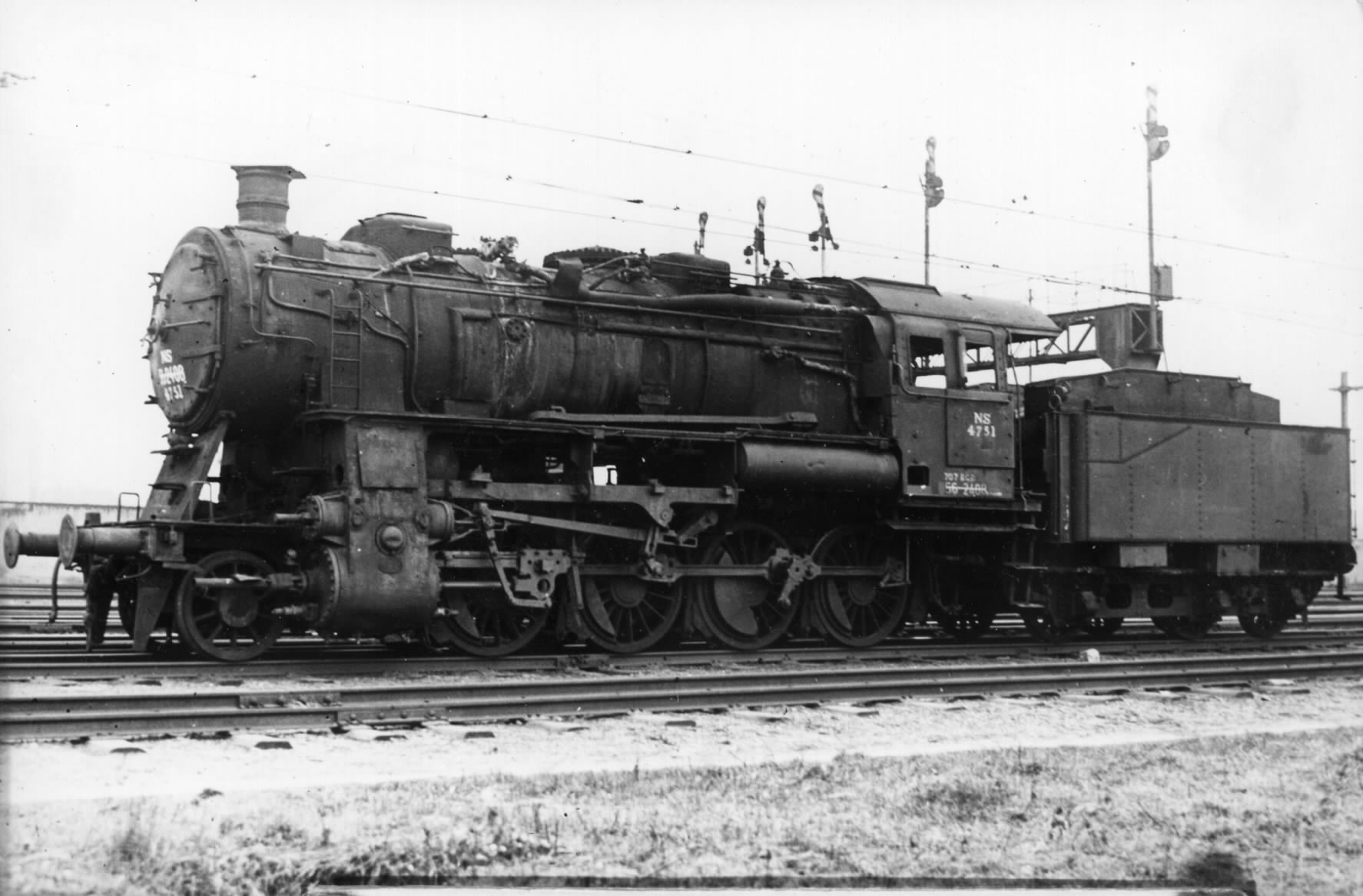
Type and origin
- Builder: Henschel & Sohn (319); Arnold Jung Lokomotivfabrik (119); Krupp (188); Linke-Hofmann (88); Hanomag (61); AEG (71)
- Build date: 1919–1928
- Total produced: 846
Specifications
- Configuration
  - Whyte: 2-8-0
- Gauge: 1,435 mm (4 ft 8 1/2 in)
- Leading dia.: 1,000 mm (3 ft 3 3/8 in)
- Driver dia.: 1,400 mm (4 ft 7 1/8 in)
- Length
  - Over beams: 16,995 mm (55 ft 9 in)
- Axle load: 17.7 t (17.4 long tons; 19.5 short tons)
- Adhesive weight: 70.2 t (69.1 long tons; 77.4 short tons)
- Service weight: 83.5 t (82.2 long tons; 92.0 short tons)
- Water cap.: 16.5 or 20.0 or 21.5 m^{3} (3,600 or 4,400 or 4,700 imp gal; 4,400 or 5,300 or 5,700 US gal)
- Boiler pressure: 14 bar (1.40 MPa; 203 lbf/in^{2})
- Heating surface
  - Firebox: 3.42 m^{2} (36.8 sq ft)
  - Evaporative: 164.15 m^{2} (1,766.9 sq ft)
- Superheater
  - Heating area: 53.12 m^{2} (571.8 sq ft)
- Cylinders: 2
- Cylinder size: 620 mm (24 7/16 in)
- Piston stroke: 660 mm (26 in)
Performance figures
- Maximum speed: 65 km/h (40 mph)
- Indicated power: 1,390 PS (1,020 kW; 1,370 hp)
Career
- Numbers: DRG 56 2001–2485, 2551–2916
- Retired: 1970s

The Prussian G 8.2 was a 2-cylinder version of the Prussian G 8.3. It was determined that the third cylinder of the G 8.3 was unnecessary and production of the G 8.3 was subsequently discontinued. Like the G 8.3, the G 8.2 had been developed from the G 12 and was essentially a shorter version of it. The locomotives were employed on heavy goods train duties on main lines. Later the top speed on some units was raised to 75 km/h so that the G 8.2 could also be used to haul passenger trains. A total of 846 G 8.2 units were built between 1919 and 1928 for the Prussian state railways and the Deutsche Reichsbahn. Five units delivered in 1921 to the Reichsbahndirektion of Oldenburg were equipped with Lentz valve gear as was customary for Oldenburg locomotives. The locomotives delivered in 1922 were Cassel division numbers; in 1923 several were supplied as DRG Class 31 before they were allocated their eventual DRG numbers in 1923. Another 150 vehicles were supplied to the Turkish and Rumanian railways. The firm of AEG converted four engines to coal-dust firing in 1930. 650 examples of these locos were still present in Germany after the Second World War. The Deutsche Reichsbahn had given them operating numbers 56 2001–2485 and 2551–2916.

In the Deutsche Bundesbahn this class was very quickly retired; the last one to go being no. 56 2637, withdrawn in 1963 and retired in 1965. The Deutsche Reichsbahn in East Germany used these locomotives right up to the early 1970s - a number even being given computer numbers. Its last stronghold was Bw Vacha in Thuringia, which had both the first and last engine to be built: nos. 56 2001 and 56 2916. In Germany no Class 56.20–29 has been preserved. No. 56 2795 is in the Warsaw railway museum as no. Tr6-39.

Link: Ehemalige 56 2795 in Warschau

== G 8.2 of the LBE ==
G 8.2 (Lübeck-Büchen Railway) DRG Class 56.30
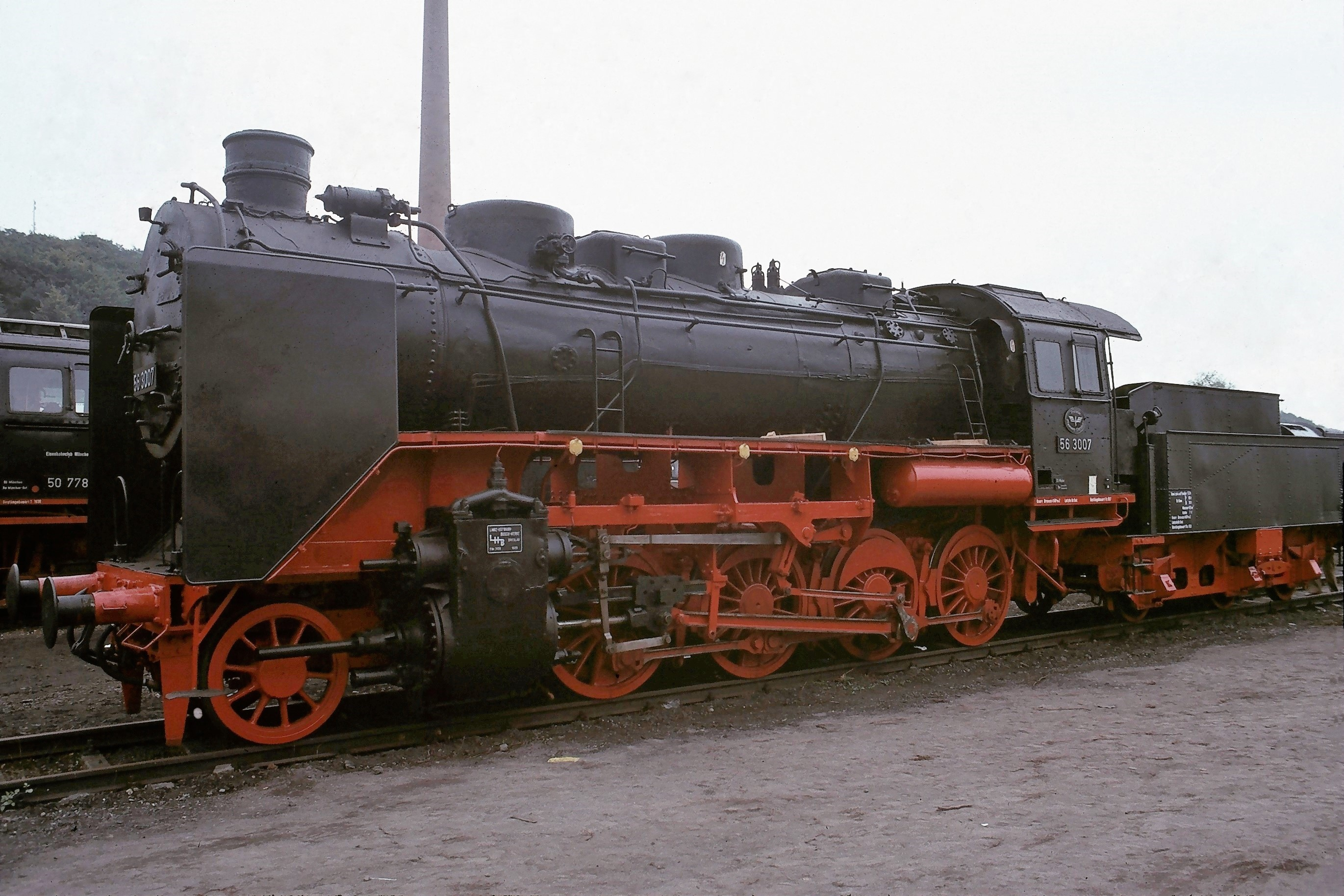
- 56 3007 in Bochum-Dahlhausen (5.10.1985)
Type and origin
- Builder: Linke-Hofmann
- Build date: 1923-1930
- Total produced: 8
Specifications
- Configuration
  - Whyte: 2-8-0
- Gauge: 1,435 mm (4 ft 8 1/2 in)
- Leading dia.: 1,000 mm (3 ft 3 3/8 in)
- Driver dia.: 1,400 mm (4 ft 7 1/8 in)
- Length
  - Over beams: 18,645 mm (61 ft 2 in)
- Axle load: 17.66 t (17.38 long tons; 19.47 short tons)
- Adhesive weight: 70.98 t (69.86 long tons; 78.24 short tons)
- Service weight: 79.4 t (78.1 long tons; 87.5 short tons)
- Water cap.: 16.5 m^{3} (3,600 imp gal; 4,400 US gal)
- Boiler pressure: 14 bar (1.40 MPa; 203 lbf/in^{2})
- Heating surface
  - Firebox: 2.63 m^{2} (28.3 sq ft)
  - Evaporative: 152.5 m^{2} (1,641 sq ft)
- Superheater
  - Heating area: 51.70 m^{2} (556.5 sq ft)
- Cylinders: 2
- Cylinder size: 620 mm (24 7/16 in)
- Piston stroke: 660 mm (26 in)
Performance figures
- Maximum speed: 75 km/h (47 mph)
Career
- Numbers: DRG 56 3001-3008

The G 8.2s with the Lübeck-Büchen Railway were certainly similar to the Prussian G 8.2s, but were in fact an independent design with numerous differences. For example, they were noticeably longer and did not appear quite as stocky. They were intended to take charge of heavy goods trains running between Hamburg and Lübeck. Because these locomotives were also to be used in passenger services, the running gear and brakes were designed so that the top speed could be raised to 75 km/h (47 mph). A total of eight engines was delivered between 1923 and 1930 by Linke-Hofmann, as LBE 91–98. In 1938 they were given Reichsbahn numbers 56 3001 to 58 3008.

The Deutsche Bundesbahn took over locomotives 56 3001 and 56 3003 to 3008 and retired them by 1951. DB sold 56 3005 to the Osthannoversche Eisenbahnen (OHE; "East Hanover Railway"), who renumbered 56 102, and retired it in 1963. No. 56 3002 was left to the Deutsche Reichsbahn (GDR) in the east, who retired her in 1956.

Locomotive 56 3007 was sold into industrial service in 1950, and has since been preserved; it is in the Darmstadt-Kranichstein Railway Museum.

The engines were equipped with tenders of classes pr 3 T 16.5, pr 3 T 20 or pr 2'2' T 21.5.

== See also ==
- Prussian state railways
- List of Prussian locomotives and railcars
