= Oldenburg T 2 =

Oldenburg T 2 DRG Class 98.1
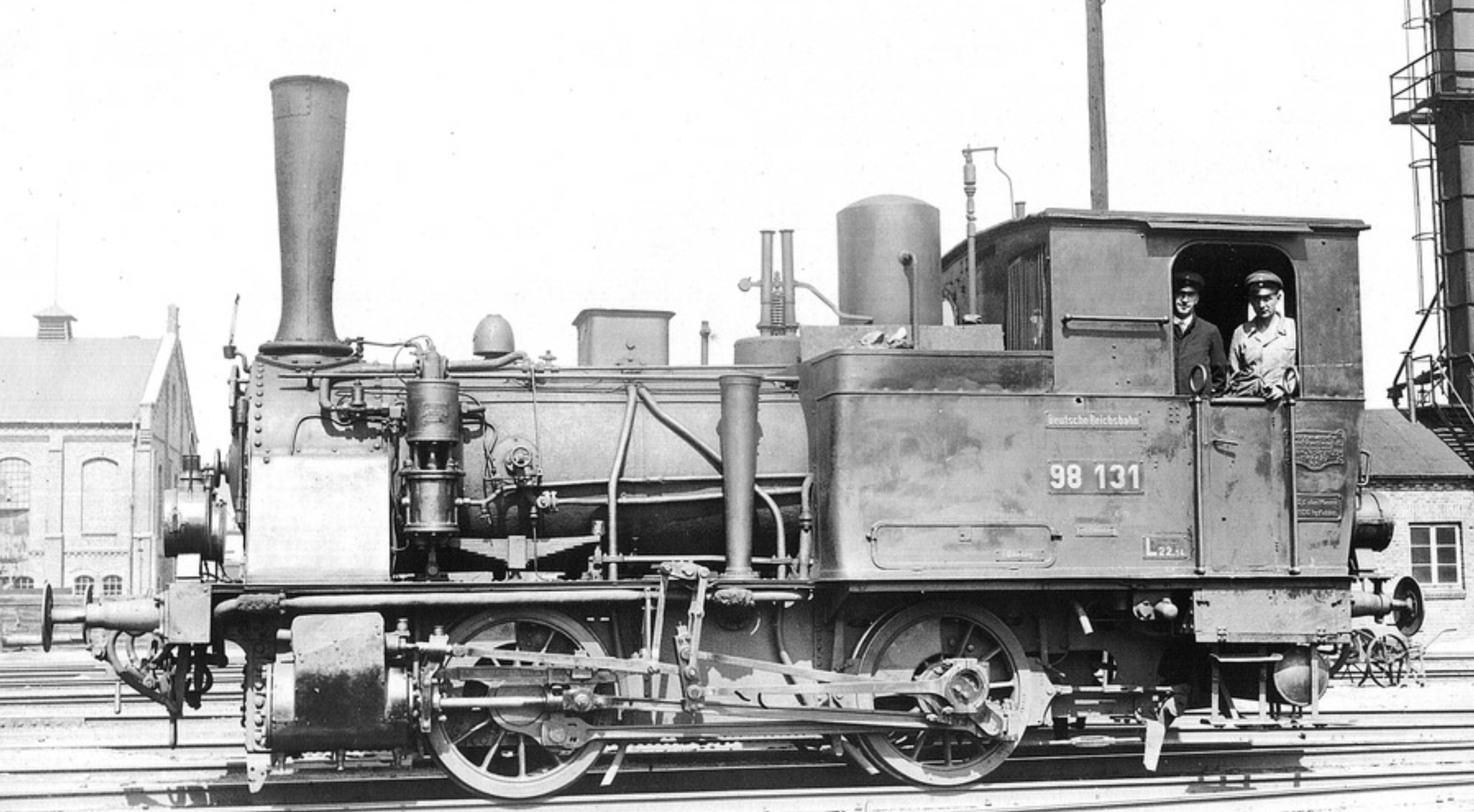
Type and origin
- Builder: Hanomag
- Build date: 1896–1913
- Total produced: 38
Specifications
- Configuration
  - Whyte: 0-4-0T
- Gauge: 1,435 mm (4 ft 8 1/2 in)
- Driver dia.: 1,100 mm (3 ft 7 1/4 in)
- Length
  - Over beams: 8,089 mm (26 ft 6 1/2 in)
- Axle load: 13.73 t (13.51 long tons; 15.13 short tons)
- Adhesive weight: 27.46 t (27.03 long tons; 30.27 short tons)
- Service weight: 27.46 t (27.03 long tons; 30.27 short tons)
- Boiler pressure: 12 kgf/cm^{2} (1,180 kPa; 171 lbf/in^{2})
- Heating surface
  - Firebox: 1.01 m^{2} (10.9 sq ft)
  - Evaporative: 57.20 m^{2} (615.7 sq ft)
- Cylinder size: 324 mm (12 3/4 in)
- Piston stroke: 550 mm (21 5/8 in)
- Loco brake: Compressed-air brake
Performance figures
- Maximum speed: 50 km/h (31 mph)
- Indicated power: 270 PS (199 kW; 266 hp)
Career
- Numbers: GOE: 112–115, 147–149, 162–164, 167–173, 197–204, 212–215, 229–230, 237–238, 241–245; DRG: 98 101–137
- Retired: 1931

The Oldenburg T 2 steam locomotives were German 0-4-0 tank engines built between 1896 and 1913 for the Grand Duchy of Oldenburg State Railways (Großherzoglich Oldenburgische Staatseisenbahnen). They were designed for use on branch lines (Lokal- and Nebenbahnen). A total of 38 units were produced, based on a Prussian T 2 prototype and differing only in the boiler fittings. Unlike their Prussian cousins, they had no steam dome and the regulator was located in the smokebox. Its permitted top speed of 50 km/h was also higher than the Prussian version.

The Deutsche Reichsbahn took over all of them, apart from number 113, designated them as DRG Class 98.1 and allocated them numbers 98 101 to 98 137. Most of the locomotives were retired in 1926 and 1927, however, and only a few were still working up to 1931. Several locomotives continued in service until 1953 as works engines in locomotive repair shops.

== See also ==
- Grand Duchy of Oldenburg State Railways
- List of Oldenburg locomotives and railbuses
- Länderbahnen

== Literature ==
- Obermayer, Horst J. (1970). Taschenbuch Deutsche Dampflokomotiven. Regelspur (in German) (2. ed.). Stuttgart: Franckh'sche Verlagshandlung. ISBN 3-440-03643-X.
- Weisbrod, Manfred; Petznik, Wolfgang (1981). Dampflokomotiven deutscher Eisenbahnen, Baureihe 97–99 (EFA 1.4) (in German) (2nd ed.). Düsseldorf: Alba. pp. 36–38. ISBN 3-87094-087-5.
