= Prussian G 8.3 =

Prussian G 8.3 DRG Class 56.1
Type and origin
- Builder: Henschel
- Build date: 1918-1920
- Total produced: 85
Specifications
- Configuration
  - Whyte: 2-8-0
- Gauge: 1,435 mm (4 ft 8 1/2 in)
- Leading dia.: 1,000 mm (3 ft 3 3/8 in)
- Driver dia.: 1,400 mm (4 ft 7 1/8 in)
- Length
  - Over beams: 16,975 mm (55 ft 8 1/4 in)
- Axle load: 17.9 t (17.6 long tons; 19.7 short tons)
- Adhesive weight: 70.7 t (69.6 long tons; 77.9 short tons)
- Service weight: 82.5 t (81.2 long tons; 90.9 short tons)
- Water cap.: 20.0 m^{3} (4,400 imp gal; 5,300 US gal)
- Boiler pressure: 14 bar (1.40 MPa; 203 lbf/in^{2})
- Heating surface
  - Firebox: 3.43 m^{2} (36.9 sq ft)
  - Evaporative: 167.05 m^{2} (1,798.1 sq ft)
- Superheater
  - Heating area: 53.12 m^{2} (571.8 sq ft)
- Cylinders: 3
- Cylinder size: 520 mm (20 1/2 in)
- Piston stroke: 660 mm (26 in)
Performance figures
- Maximum speed: 65–75 kilometres per hour (40–47 mph)
- Indicated power: 1,240 PS (912 kW; 1,220 hp)
Career
- Numbers: DRG 56 101 – 56 185
- Retired: 1967

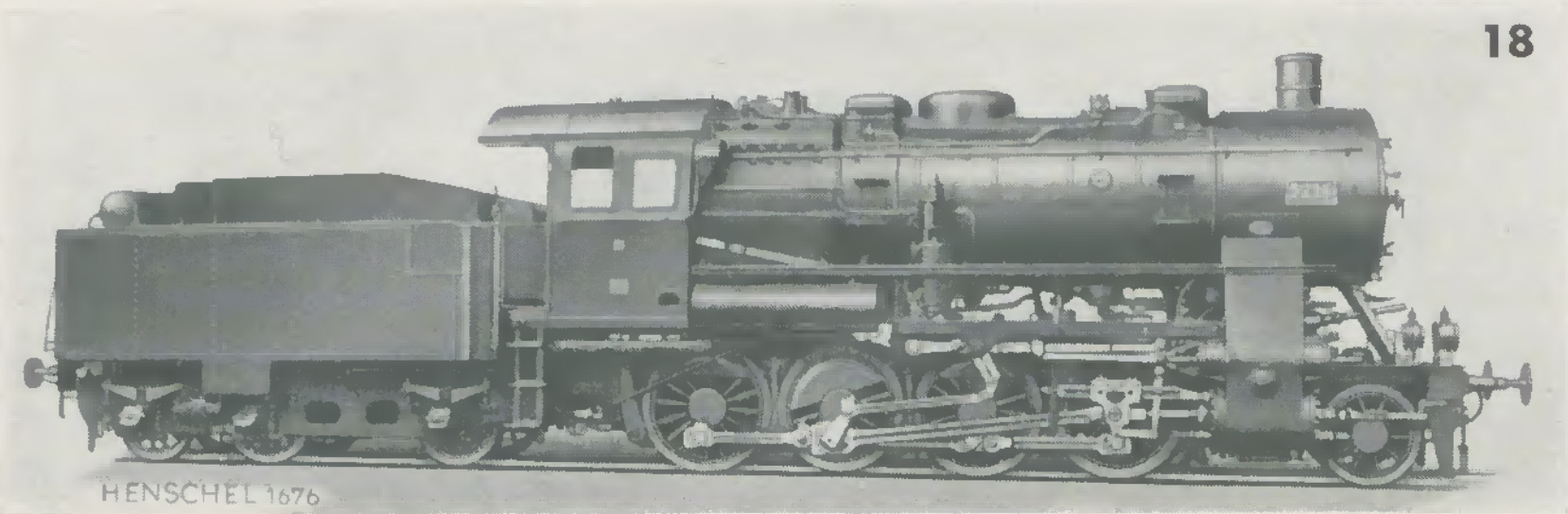
German freight locomotive Class G 8.3 of the Prussian State Railways, built in 1919

The Prussian G 8.3 was a 2-8-0, superheated, freight locomotive with three cylinders. It was developed to redress the lack of goods locomotives after the First World War. The inspiration to design a 2-8-0 locomotive based on the 2-10-0 Prussian G 12 came from Württemberg. The first vehicle was delivered in 1918. Compared with the G 12, the G 8.3 had one boiler shell and coupled axle fewer. After it had proved itself, a total of 85 examples of the G 8.3 were placed in service, all of which were taken over by the Reichsbahn, where they were numbered 56 101 to 56 185. No more were built thereafter because the G 8.2, with only two cylinders, was less costly to procure and maintain.

Of the 68 engines that survived the Second World War, 6 went into the Deutsche Bundesbahn, who transferred them in 1948 to private railways, and 62 to the DR in East Germany. The DR machines were retired by 1967.

The vehicles were equipped with Prussian pr 3 T 20 tenders.

== See also ==
- Prussian state railways
- List of Prussian locomotives and railcars
