= KkStB 99 =

kkStB 99 / NÖLB 2 / BBÖ 99 / FS 876 / DRB 98.13 / ÖBB 91 / ČSD 320.0 kkStB 199 / NÖLB 102 / BBÖ 199 / FS 877 / DRB 98.13 / ÖBB 91.1
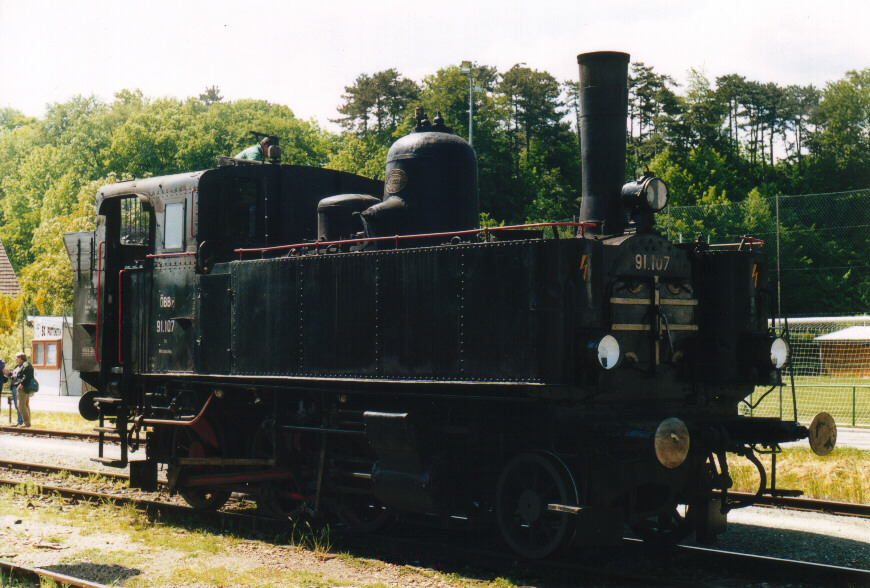
- 91.107 in Pottenstein; special trip on the occasion of the opening of the Freiland–Türnitz line, 19 May 2001
Type and origin
- Power type: Steam
- Builder: 99: Krauss (Linz) (44); Lokomotivfabrik Floridsdorf (23); Böhmisch-Mährische Maschinenfabrik (7); 199: Krauss (Linz) (28); Lokomotivfabrik der StEG (1)
- Build date: 99: 1897–1907; 199: 1908–1914
- Total produced: 99: 74; 199: 29
Specifications
- Configuration
  - Whyte: 2-6-0T
  - UIC: 1′C n2vt
- Gauge: 1,435 mm (4 ft 8 1/2 in) standard gauge
- Leading dia.: 870 mm (34 1/4 in)
- Driver dia.: 1,140 mm (44 7/8 in)
- Wheelbase: 5,050 mm (16 ft 6 3/4 in)
- Length: 8,866 mm (29 ft 1 in)
- Height: 4,400 mm (14 ft 5 1/4 in)
- Adhesive weight: 99: 30.0 t (29.5 long tons; 33.1 short tons); 199: 31.5 t (31.0 long tons; 34.7 short tons)
- Loco weight: 99: 39.3 t (38.7 long tons; 43.3 short tons); 199: 41.95 t (41.29 long tons; 46.24 short tons)
- Fuel type: Coal
- Boiler pressure: 13 bar (1,300 kPa; 190 psi); 13 kg/cm^{2} (1,275 kPa; 185 psi)
- Heating surface
  - Firebox: 6.7 m^{2} (72 sq ft)
- Cylinders: Two, compound
- High-pressure cylinder: 370 mm × 570 mm (14 9/16 in × 22 7/16 in)
- Low-pressure cylinder: 570 mm × 570 mm (22 7/16 in × 22 7/16 in)
Performance figures
- Maximum speed: 99: 50 km/h (31 mph); 199: 60 km/h (37 mph)

The kkStB 99 was a class of 2-6-0T locomotives operated by the Imperial Royal Austrian State Railways (kaiserlich-königliche österreichische Staatsbahnen), or k.k.StB, for duties on secondary routes (Nebenbahnen) and branch lines (Lokalbahnen).

== History ==
In 1897 the delivery of the kkStB 99 series began. It fulfilled the requirements placed on it for a 300 PS (296 hp; 221 kW) engine and, with good coal it even reached 400 PS. By 1908 69 units had been built and, between 1903 and 1907 another 5 units went to the NÖLB as Class 2, which were deployed to the Korneuburg - Hohenau Lokalbahn. The kkStB engines were to be found in the Karlsbad, Laibach and Knittelfeld areas. Five 99s were employed on the Vienna suburban lines in charge of light trains. Of note was the use of the Karlsbad locomotives on the inclines of the Schlackenwerth–Joachimsthal Lokalbahn with its inclines of up to 50 per mille (5% or 1:20).

Between 1908 and 1913, 20 locomotives of the 199 series were built, an evolutionary development, that had a greater water capacity and could carry more coal. These engines worked the lines Bolzano-Meran, Krems-Mauthausen and on the changeover (Wechselstrecke) of the Aspangbahn. The same type was also built in nine examples for the NÖLB as class 102 and they were employed on the Freiland–Türnitz line (cf. Leobersdorfer Bahn).

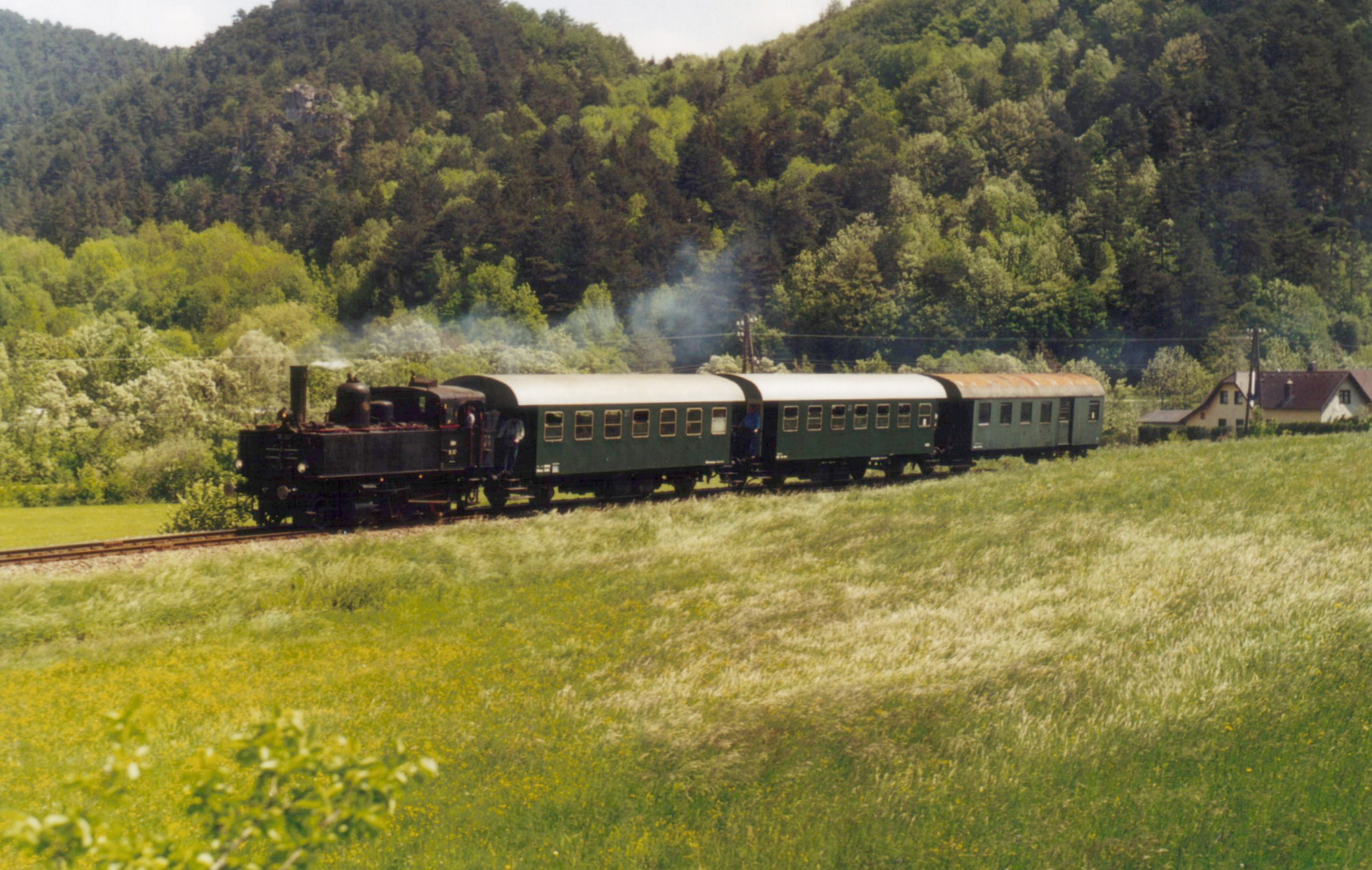
Locomotive 91.107 with a 'special' for Türnitz

After World War I, Italy was given eight engines (FS Class 876 and 877), Yugoslavia 11 and Czechoslovakia 34 units of these classes. 34 locomotives remained with the BBÖ and retained their kkStB numbers. In 1923 in the wake of nationalisation the locomotives of the NÖLB went into the BBÖ, where they were given numbers 99.70–74 (ex-class 2) and 199.21–29 (ex-class 102).

In the inter-war years, these locomotives were mainly employed on the secondary lines of Wels, Bad Radkersburg and Pöchlarn, but also on many other branch lines. On being taken over by the Deutsche Reichsbahn in 1938 the locomotives in class 99 were allocated the numbers 98.1301–1324, and the class 199s the numbers 98.1352–1374.

In 1953 the Austrian Federal Railway (ÖBB) took over fifteen 99s as ÖBB 91 and nine 199s as ÖBB 91.1. The last two digits of the serial numbers remained the same as with the BBÖ. In 1960 they began to concentrate the classes, so that the majority of locomotives were to be found in Neustadt and Mürzzuschlag. By 1968 all bar 3 locomotives had been retired.

The last area of operations for these 3 locomotives was the Mürzzuschlag - Neuberg branch line. In 1972 they, too, were withdrawn.

== See also ==
- Deutsche Reichsbahn
- List of DRG locomotives and railbuses
