= DRG Class 98.11 =

Type and origin
- Power type: Steam
- Rebuilder: RAW Weiden
- Rebuild date: 1934–1941
- Number rebuilt: 29
Specifications
- Configuration
  - Whyte: 2-8-0T
  - UIC: 1′D h2t
  - German: L 45.11
- Gauge: 1,435 mm (4 ft 8 1/2 in)
- Leading dia.: 800 mm (2 ft 7 1/2 in)
- Driver dia.: 1,006 mm (3 ft 3 5/8 in)
- Wheelbase
  - Axle spacing (Asymmetrical): 2,200 mm (7 ft 2 5/8 in) +; 1,415 mm (4 ft 7 3/4 in) +; 1,415 mm (4 ft 7 3/4 in) +; 1,070 mm (3 ft 6 1/8 in) =
  - Engine: 6,100 mm (20 ft 1/8 in)
- Length
  - Over headstocks: 8,900 mm (29 ft 2 3/8 in)
  - Over buffers: 10,200 mm (33 ft 5 5/8 in)
- Height: 4,250 mm (13 ft 11 5/16 in)
- Axle load: 10.6 t (10.4 long tons; 11.7 short tons)
- Adhesive weight: 42.5 t (41.8 long tons; 46.8 short tons)
- Empty weight: 40.5 t (39.9 long tons; 44.6 short tons)
- Service weight: 50.7 t (49.9 long tons; 55.9 short tons)
- Fuel type: Coal
- Fuel capacity: 2.6 t (2.6 long tons; 2.9 short tons)
- Water cap.: 5.1 m^{3} (1,120 imp gal; 1,350 US gal)
- Firebox
  - Grate area: 1.34 m^{2} (14.4 sq ft)
- Boiler
  - Pitch: 2,450 mm (8 ft 1/2 in)
  - Tube plates: 3,500 mm (11 ft 5 3/4 in)
  - Small tubes: 44.5 mm (1 3/4 in), 89 off
  - Large tubes: 133 mm (5 1/4 in), 12 off
- Boiler pressure: 12 kg/cm^{2} (11.8 bar; 171 psi)
- Heating surface
  - Firebox: 5.58 m^{2} (60.1 sq ft)
  - Tubes: 38.65 m^{2} (416.0 sq ft)
  - Flues: 16.50 m^{2} (177.6 sq ft)
  - Total surface: 61.00 m^{2} (656.6 sq ft)
- Superheater
  - Heating area: 18.93 m^{2} (203.8 sq ft)
- Cylinders: Two
- Cylinder size: 508 mm × 460 mm (20 in × 18 1/8 in)
- Loco brake: Compressed air brakes
Performance figures
- Maximum speed: 55 km/h (34 mph)
- Power output: 450 PS (331 kW; 444 hp)
- Tractive effort: 101 kN (22,700 lbf)
Career
- Operators: Deutsche Reichsbahn-Gesellschaft; Deutsche Reichsbahn; Deutsche Bundesbahn
- Numbers: 98 1101 – 98 1129
- Retired: 1960–1968

The Class 98.11 steam locomotives of the Deutsche Reichsbahn were rebuilds of the Bavarian Class GtL 4/4 (DRG Class 98.8-9).

Because the riding qualities of the Class 98.10 were still not good enough to raise the speed of branch line (Lokalbahn) trains in Bavaria significantly, the Reichsbahn decided in 1934 to rebuild a Class GtL 4/4 engine (no. 98 906). Amongst other things, it was given an additional leading axle. As a result, the boiler and driver's cab had to be moved forward, which resulted in their having to be raised by 250 mm.

After trials with the locomotive had proved successful, it was decided to modify another 26 engines by 1939 and to allocate them to a new locomotive class. A further engine followed in each of the years 1940 and 1941. The rebuilds were given numbers 98 1101 - 98 1129.

The permitted top speed of the rebuilds could be raised to 55 km/h, compared with 40 km/h for the GtL 4/4 and 45 km/h for the Class 98.10.

All 29 locomotives survived the Second World War. Apart from 98 1108, which went to the DR in East Germany, they all went into the Deutsche Bundesbahn. The East German engine was retired in 1967; those in the West between 1960 and 1968.

== See also ==
- List of Bavarian locomotives and railbuses
- List of DRG locomotives and railbuses
