= Bavarian GtL 4/4 =

Bavarian GtL 4/4, LAG nr. 80–81 DRG Class 98.8–9, 16
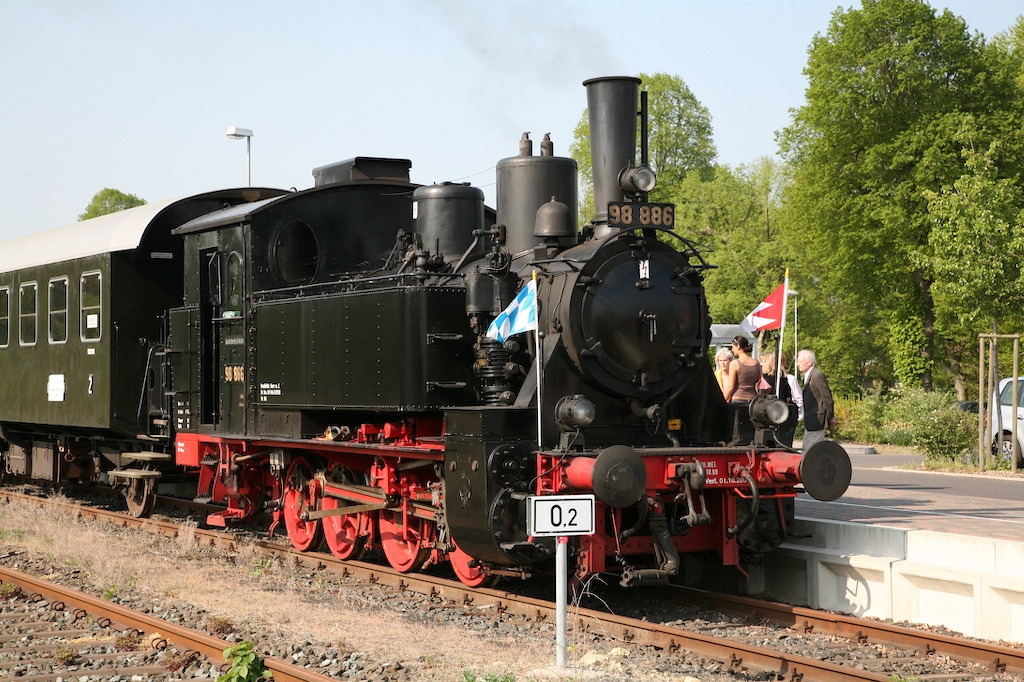
- 98 886 in Mellrichstadt, April 2007
Type and origin
- Builder: Krauss
- Build date: 1911–1927
- Total produced: 121
Specifications
- Configuration
  - Whyte: 0-8-0T
  - German: 1911–24 locos: L 44.11; 1927 batch: L 44.12
- Gauge: 1,435 mm (4 ft 8 1/2 in)
- Driver dia.: 1,006 mm (3 ft 3 5/8 in)
- Length
  - Over beams: 1911–24 locos: 9,250 mm (30 ft 4 1/4 in); 1927 batch: 9,400 mm (30 ft 10 in)
- Axle load: 10.8 t (10.6 long tons; 11.9 short tons)
- Adhesive weight: 43.0–46.7 t (42.3–46.0 long tons; 47.4–51.5 short tons)
- Service weight: 43.0–46.7 t (42.3–46.0 long tons; 47.4–51.5 short tons)
- Fuel capacity: 1.8 t (4,000 lb) coal
- Water cap.: 5.4 m^{3} (1,190 imp gal; 1,430 US gal)
- Boiler
- No. of heating tubes: 89
- No. of smoke tubes: 12
- Heating tube length: 3,500 mm (11 ft 5 3/4 in)
- Boiler pressure: 12 kg/cm^{2} (1,180 kPa; 171 lbf/in^{2})
- Heating surface
  - Firebox: 1.36 m^{2} (14.6 sq ft)
  - Radiative: 5.85 m^{2} (63.0 sq ft)
  - Tubes: 55.14 m^{2} (593.5 sq ft)
  - Evaporative: 60.99 m^{2} (656.5 sq ft)
- Superheater
  - Heating area: 18.93 m^{2} (203.8 sq ft)
- Cylinders: 2
- Cylinder size: 508 mm (20 in)
- Piston stroke: 460 mm (18 1/8 in)
Performance figures
- Maximum speed: 40 km/h (25 mph)
- Indicated power: 450 PS (331 kW; 444 hp)
Career
- Numbers: K.Bay.Sts.E.: 2551–2563, 2564–2650; LAG 80, 81; DRG: 98 801 – 917, 98 1601 – 98 1602; EAG/TAG 5, 6
- Retired: 1970

The Bavarian Class GtL 4/4 engines were superheated steam locomotives in service with the Royal Bavarian State Railways (Königlich Bayerische Staats-Eisenbahnen) for duties on branch lines (Lokalbahnen).

== History ==
Bavarian GtL 4/4 locomotives were supplied by Krauss to the state railway. In 1911, two were delivered and, in 1914, they were followed by a further eleven engines.

As a result of their positive experience with the GtL 4/4 the Bavarian Group Administration (Gruppenverwaltung Bayern) of the Deutsche Reichsbahn decided to procure more examples of this locomotive. From 1921 to 1927 Krauss supplied another 108 engines that were somewhat heavier and differed from the original versions in the design of the driver's cab. The last 17 locomotives from 1927 were even heavier than the previous engines, which was due to the increased size of water and coal tanks. Boiler, drive and power remained unchanged over the entire procurement period. The locomotives were designated as DRG Class 98.8-9 by the Reichsbahn, and were given the numbers 98 801 to 98 917.

== GtL 4/5 ==
Although the GtL 4/4 proved very successful, the Deutsche Reichsbahn decided to order a modified, faster version. This resulted in the DRG Class 98.10, unofficially called the GtL 4/5, which had a trailing axle in the shape of a Krauss-Helmholtz bogie. A total of 45 were built between 1930 and 1933.

Despite the trailing axle the top speed could only be raised to 45 km/h so the Reichsbahn decided to rebuild existing GtL 4/4s, this time adding a leading Bissel axle. Confusingly the unofficial Bavarian notation for these was also GtL 4/5, but the Reichsbahn classified them as the DRG Class 98.11, which had a top speed of 55 km/h. A total of 29 were converted in this way.

== Lokalbahn AG locomotives ==
The Lokalbahn Company (Lokalbahn Aktien-Gesellschaft or LAG) had also bought two GtL 4/4 machines in 1922, that were identical to the state railway versions from 1921. The vehicles, with running numbers 80 and 81, were stabled at Thalkirchen shed on the Isar Valley line (Isartalbahn). They remained there even after being taken over by the Reichsbahn. They were later converted to a 1'D1' configuration, but unlike the other GtL 4/4 locos, were grouped into DRG Class 98.16 and given numbers 98 1601 and 98 1602.

== Retirement ==
During the Second World War five locomotives were destroyed, a further three remained with the Czechoslovak State Railways. The remaining machines went into the Deutsche Bundesbahn, which began retiring them in the 1950s. The two LAG engines were sent to Rosenheim shed in 1950 and were retired in 1957 and 1958.

== Preserved locomotives ==
Two locomotives, numbers 98 812 and 98 886, were given EDP operating numbers in 1968, but were retired shortly thereafter. Both locomotives have been preserved: number 98 812 is a working museum locomotive with the Ulm Railway Society (Ulmer Eisenbahnfreunde). Number 98 886 has been made operational again and hauls the Little Rhön Train (Rhön-Zügle) from Mellrichstadt to Fladungen.

== Gallery ==
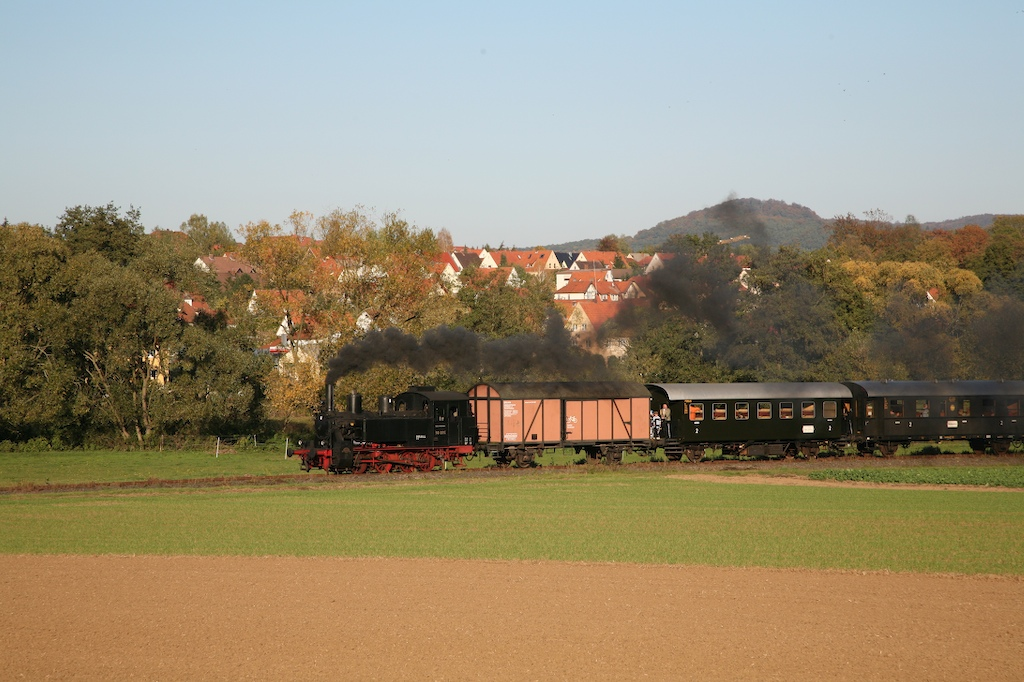
Steaming towards Ostheim

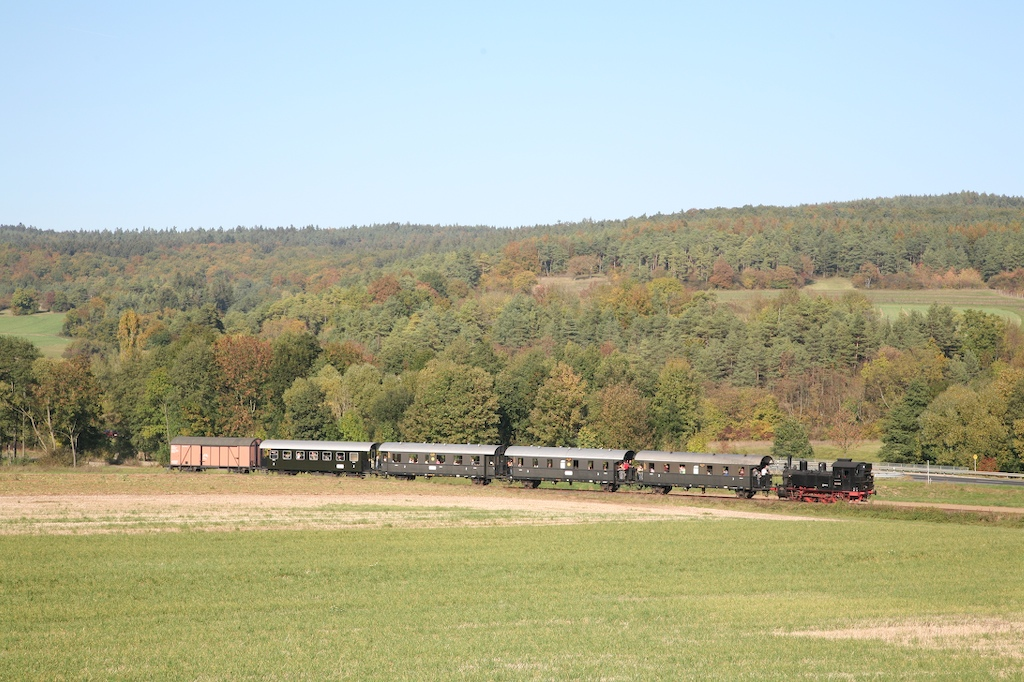
In front of Nordheim heading down the valley

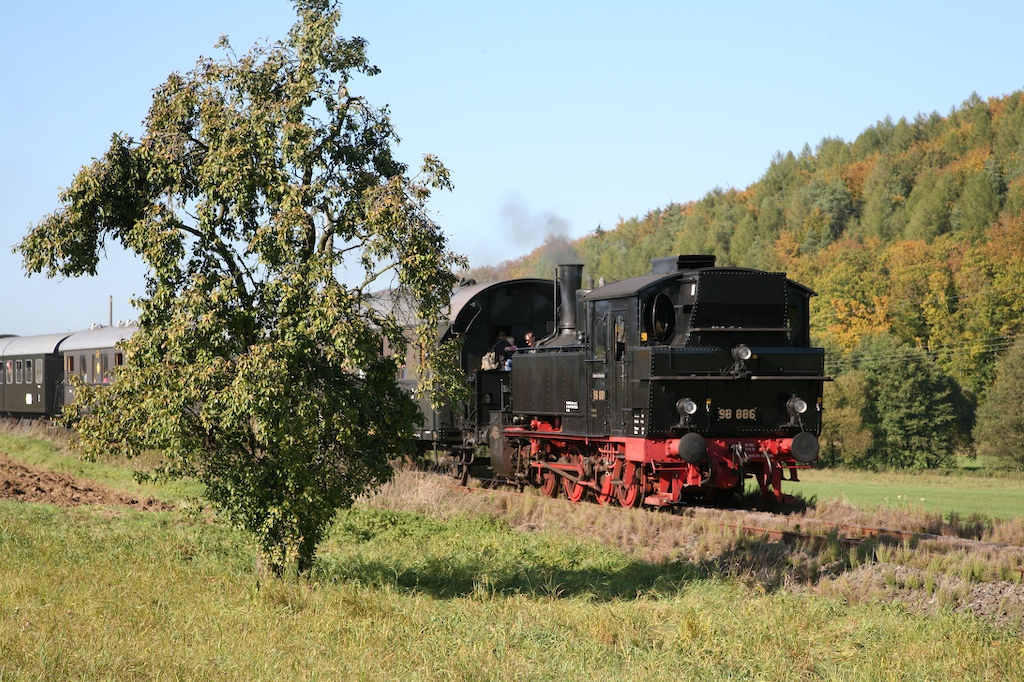
At the Heufurt crossing

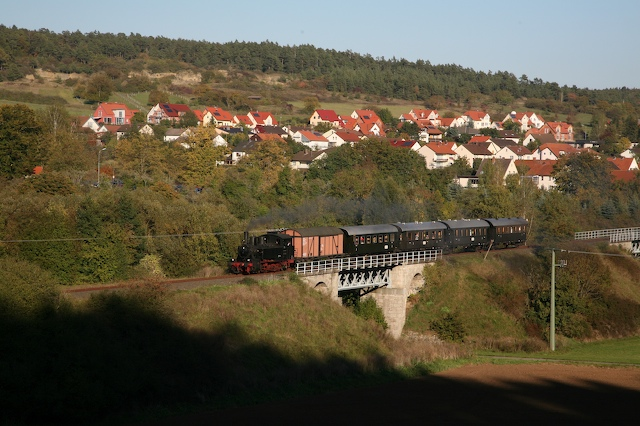
At Stockheim

The only working GtL 4/4, number 98 886, on the Mellrichstadt-Fladungen museum railway in August 2006.

== See also ==
- List of Bavarian locomotives and railbuses
- Bavarian branch lines
