= Prussian P 4 =

Prototype German 4-4-0 express steam locomotive of the Prussian State Railways

Type and origin
- Builder: Henschel
- Build date: 1898
- Total produced: 1
Specifications
- Configuration
  - Whyte: 4-4-0
  - UIC: 2'B h2
  - German: P 24.45
- Gauge: 1,435 mm (4 ft 8 1/2 in)
- Coupled dia.: 1,750 mm
- Carrying wheel diameter: 1,000 mm
- Wheelbase
  - Overall: 7,400 mm
- Length
  - Over beams: 16,411 mm
- Axle load: 15.5 t
- Adhesive weight: 31.0 t
- Empty weight: 44.6 t
- Service weight: 49.1 t
- Water cap.: 15.0 m^{3}
- Boiler
- No. of heating tubes: 141
- No. of smoke tubes: 1 fire tube
- Boiler pressure: 12 bar
- Heating surface
  - Firebox: 2.32 m^{2}
  - Radiative: 8.9 m^{2}
  - Tubes: 76.2 m^{2}
  - Evaporative: 85.1 m^{2}
- Superheater
  - Heating area: 21.0 m^{2}
- Cylinders: 2
- Cylinder size: 460 mm
- Piston stroke: 600 mm
Performance figures
- Maximum speed: 90 km/h
- Indicated power: 675 kW (900 PS)
Career
- Retired: 1921

The Prussian P 4 was a derivative of the P 4.1 (Hanover variant) and the second superheated steam locomotive in the world.

== Design ==
The engine was based on that of the Class P 4.1 that had Hanomag had produced in large numbers since 1892. It had slightly larger wheels and, due to its new design, significantly fewer heating tubes. The superheater and the steam engine were entirely independent designs.

== Service and preservation ==
In 1898 a one-off was delivered by Hanomag to the Prussian state railways. The economy of the superheated system was soon proven in 1899 by the engine during trial runs from Kassel. Apart from a short stay at Halle the engine was assigned to Kassel as Cassel 131 and, from 1906, as P 4 Cassel 1846. In 1921, after the First World War, the engine was mothballed, along with many other machines of similar class. With its sectioned boiler the P 4 stood for a long time in the Transport and Construction Museums, part of Museum of the Present at Hamburger Bahnhof in Berlin.

== See also ==
- Prussian state railways
- List of Prussian locomotives and railbuses
- List of preserved steam locomotives in Germany
