= DRG Class 98.10 =

DRG Class 98^{10}
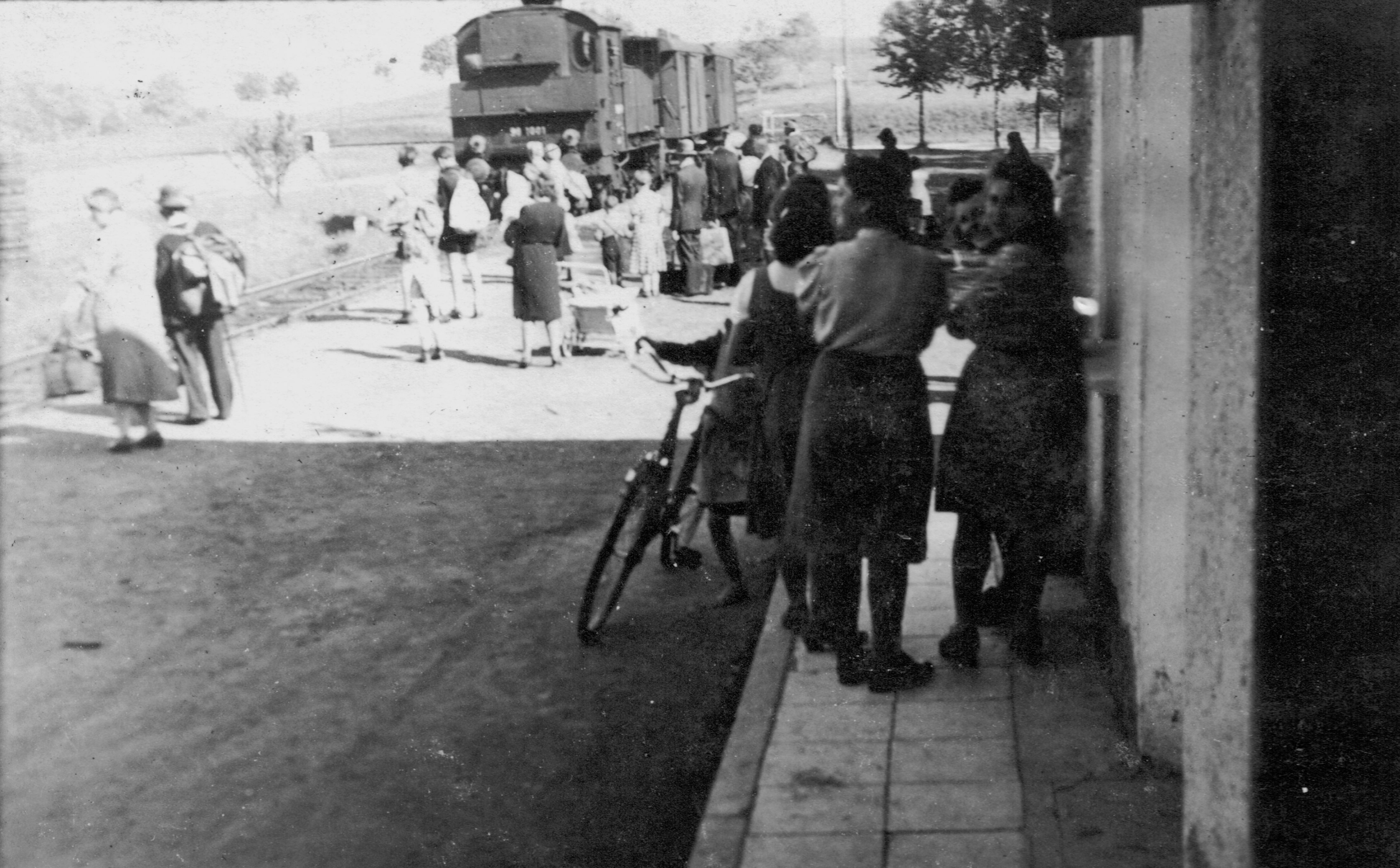
- A Class 98.10 from Falkenstein to Gfäll arriving at the station
Type and origin
- Power type: Steam
- Builder: Krauss (21); Krauss-Maffei (24)
- Build date: 1929–1933
- Total produced: 45
Specifications
- Configuration
  - Whyte: 0-8-2T
  - UIC: D1′ h2t
  - German: L 45.11
- Gauge: 1,435 mm (4 ft 8 1/2 in)
- Driver dia.: 1,006 mm (3 ft 3 5/8 in)
- Trailing dia.: 850 mm (2 ft 9 1/2 in)
- Wheelbase
  - Axle spacing (Asymmetrical): 1,415 mm (4 ft 7 3/4 in) +; 1,415 mm (4 ft 7 3/4 in) +; 1,070 mm (3 ft 6 1/8 in) +; 2,000 mm (6 ft 6 3/4 in) =
  - Engine: 5,900 mm (19 ft 4 1/4 in)
- Length
  - Over headstocks: 8,710 mm (28 ft 6 7/8 in)
  - Over buffers: 10,050 mm (32 ft 11 5/8 in)
- Height: 4,250 mm (13 ft 11 5/16 in)
- Axle load: 11.5 t (11.3 long tons; 12.7 short tons)
- Adhesive weight: 46.2 t (45.5 long tons; 50.9 short tons)
- Empty weight: 42.9 t (42.2 long tons; 47.3 short tons)
- Service weight: 54.5 t (53.6 long tons; 60.1 short tons)
- Fuel type: Coal
- Fuel capacity: 2.7 t (2.7 long tons; 3.0 short tons)
- Water cap.: 6.3 m^{3} (1,400 imp gal; 1,700 US gal)
- Firebox
  - Grate area: 1.34 m^{2} (14.4 sq ft)
- Boiler
  - Pitch: 2,450 mm (8 ft 1/2 in)
  - Tube plates: 3,500 mm (11 ft 5 3/4 in)
  - Small tubes: 45 mm (1 3/4 in), 89 off
  - Large tubes: 133 mm (5 1/4 in), 12 off
- Boiler pressure: 12 kg/cm^{2} (11.8 bar; 171 psi)
- Heating surface
  - Firebox: 5.85 m^{2} (63.0 sq ft)
  - Tubes: 39.20 m^{2} (421.9 sq ft)
  - Flues: 16.36 m^{2} (176.1 sq ft)
  - Total surface: 61.41 m^{2} (661.0 sq ft)
- Superheater
  - Heating area: 18.93 m^{2} (203.8 sq ft)
- Cylinders: Two, outside
- Cylinder size: 460 mm × 508 mm (18 1/8 in × 20 in)
- Loco brake: Compressed-air brakes
Performance figures
- Maximum speed: 45 km/h (28 mph)
- Indicated power: 450 PS (331 kW; 444 hp)
Career
- Operators: Deutsche Reichsbahn; → Deutsche Bundesbahn
- Numbers: 98 1001 – 98 1045
- Retired: 1957–1966

The locomotives of DRG Class 98.10 (Baureihe 98.10 and, unofficially, the Bavarian GtL 4/5) were superheated steam locomotives with the Deutsche Reichsbahn-Gesellschaft.

After the Bavarian GtL 4/4 (Bayerische GtL 4/4) class engines had proved to be very reliable and had all been taken over by the Reichsbahn, it was decided to build further examples of them. However, because they were very slow with a top speed of 40 km/h (25 mph), the design was modified and the so-called GtL 4/5 was built with an additional trailing axle, that was linked to the final coupled axle by a Krauss-Helmholtz bogie.

In 1929 Krauss supplied the first five examples of these machines. In 1930 and 1931 there followed further batches of six and ten locomotives respectively. The remaining engines were manufactured by the newly created firm of Krauss-Maffei in 1932 and 1933.

In spite of the extra carrying axle the top speed could only be raised to 45 km/h (28 mph), so that later rebuilds or new engines were based on the GtL 4/4 (the rebuild becoming the DRG Class 98.11 (1′D)) and LAG Nos. 87 and 88 (1′D1′)).

All 45 locomotives of DRG Class 98.10 passed over to the Deutsche Bundesbahn after the Second World War. Their retirement began in 1957 and was complete by 1966.

== See also ==
- List of Bavarian locomotives and railbuses
- List of DRG locomotives and railbuses
