= Prussian P 4.1 =

Passenger steam locomotives

Prussian P 4.1 PKP Od1
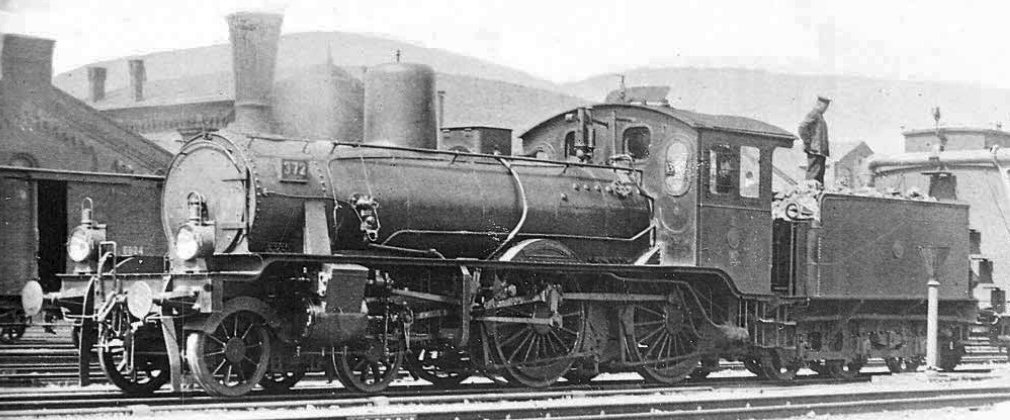
- Prussian P 4.1 locomotive
Type and origin
- Power type: Steam
- Builder: Henschel & Sohn; EMBG; Hanomag; Berliner Maschinenbau; Borsig
- Build date: 1891–1901
Specifications
- Configuration
  - Whyte: 4-4-0
  - UIC: 2'B n2
- Gauge: 1,435 mm (4 ft 8 1/2 in)
- Leading dia.: 908 mm (2 ft 11 3/4 in)
- Driver dia.: 1,750 mm (5 ft 8 7/8 in)
- Length
  - Over buffers: Erfurt variant: 15,615 mm (51 ft 2 3/4 in); Hannover variant: 16,411 mm (53 ft 10 1/8 in)
- Height: 3,080 mm (10 ft 1 1/4 in)
- Axle load: 15 t (15 long tons; 17 short tons)
- Service weight: 47.6 t (46.8 long tons; 52.5 short tons) (earlier: 49.1 t (48.3 long tons; 54.1 short tons))
- Firebox
  - Grate area: 2.30 m^{2} (24.8 sq ft)
- Boiler pressure: 12 bar (1.20 MPa; 12.2 kgf/cm^{2}; 174 psi)
- Heating surface
  - Firebox: 117.9 m^{2} (1,269 sq ft) (earlier: 125.5 m^{2} (1,351 sq ft))
- Cylinder size: 430 or 460 mm (16 15/16 or 18 1/8 in)
- Piston stroke: 600 mm (23 5/8 in)
Performance figures
- Maximum speed: 90 km/h (56 mph)
- Tractive effort: 5,800 kgf (57,000 N; 13,000 lbf)

Prussian P 4.1 were passenger steam locomotives of the Prussian KPEV series, manufactured between 1891 and 1901. These locomotives had a 2'B wheel arrangement and a twin-cylinder saturated steam engine. Under the Treaty of Versailles, Poland received 21 locomotives of this type, designated as Od1 by the Polish State Railways after 1923. In Germany, the DRG operated them as series 36^{70}.

== History ==
The design of the P 4 passenger locomotive, like the contemporary express locomotive series S 2 and S 3 (designations introduced in 1906), benefited from a study trip by German engineers to the United States and the United Kingdom to examine local locomotive designs. This led to a new generation of Prussian passenger and express locomotives with a 2'B wheel arrangement, featuring a two-axle leading bogie and two driving axles. These differed mainly in driving wheel diameter (1,750 mm for passenger locomotives, 1,980 mm for express). Previously, weaker 1B locomotives were used for both services.

In 1891, the Prussian railway directorate in Erfurt ordered two prototype passenger locomotives from Henschel in Kassel. These had 1,730 mm driving wheels and twin-cylinder engines, alongside two similar locomotives with compound engines (later series P 4.2) and four express locomotives (twin and compound). The prototype passenger locomotives with twin-cylinder engines were numbered Erfurt 496 and 497, renumbered in 1906 to P 4 Erfurt 1801 and 1802.

Following the prototypes, Henschel produced a series of 55 twin-cylinder passenger locomotives between 1891 and 1892, based on an improved design designated as the Prussian standard pattern (Musterblatt) III-1c. Most (26) went to the Erfurt directorate, with others allocated to Berlin, Elberfeld, and Magdeburg. The main change from the prototypes was a slight increase in driving wheel diameter to 1,750 mm, retaining the internal Allan valve gear. From 1911, these were designated as series P 4.1.

The design was later refined, mirroring improvements in the express S 3 series. A Hanover-type leading bogie, positioned further forward, increased the wheelbase by 825 mm to 7,400 mm. Cylinder diameter grew from 430 mm to 460 mm, and external Heusinger valve gear was adopted. This updated locomotive, designated Musterblatt III-1d, saw 325 units built by Henschel between 1893 and 1901, with an additional 100 from other manufacturers (60 Hanomag, 25 Borsig, 8 Schwartzkopff, and 7 Grafenstaden). Including the two prototypes, 482 twin-cylinder 2'B passenger locomotives were built for Prussian railways.

== Operation ==
In 1906, Prussian railways classified these locomotives as series P 4 (including compound-engined units) and assigned new numbers (1801–1900) within each directorate. In 1911, twin-cylinder locomotives were distinguished as sub-series P 4.1, while compound-engined units became P 4.2. P 4.1 locomotives were initially used for passenger services and some express trains. However, they were soon overtaken by the more powerful P 4.2, followed by newer P 6 and P 8 series on main lines.

After World War I, Prussian locomotives transferred to the German DRG, but most P 4.1 units were retired as obsolete. A 1923 plan proposed renumbering 157 units, but by 1925, only nine received new designations as DRG series 36^{70} (36 7001–7009), all withdrawn between 1926 and 1927. Poland received 21 P 4.1 locomotives post-war, which the Polish State Railways designated as series Od1. None remained in Poland after World War II.

Several P 4.1 locomotives were allocated elsewhere: a few to Lithuania, three to Latvia, and four to Yugoslavia. In Latvia, they were classified as series An (2'B locomotives) with numbers 32–34. Locomotive An-33 survived until the 1940 Soviet annexation, when it was absorbed by Soviet railways.

== Modifications and related types ==
On 29 July 1898, Henschel-built locomotive Cassel 131 (Musterblatt III-1d, later P 4 Cassel 1846) was experimentally fitted with a Schmidt superheater, becoming the second locomotive globally with this feature, following the express S 4.

In 1907, five Musterblatt III-1c locomotives from the Frankfurt directorate were rebuilt with compound engines and reclassified as P 4.2. Similar locomotives were ordered by other German railways. Three Musterblatt III-1d units were built for the Royal Military Railways (Kgl. Militär-Eisenbahn) in 1903, 1904, and 1910 (one by Hanomag, two by Linke-Hofmann in Wrocław), though the rationale for ordering these outdated designs is unclear.

Hanomag produced 19 similar locomotives for the Oldenburg railways between 1896 and 1902. These had a shorter 6,250 mm wheelbase, reduced spacing between the bogie and driving axles (2,150 mm between driving axles), no steam dome (only a box-shaped sandbox and safety valves), and a length of 15,513 mm with a three-axle tender. In 1925, these were designated DRG series 36^{12} (36 1201–1219) and withdrawn by 1931.

In 1904, the private Lübeck–Büchen railway (LBE) ordered two locomotives based on the Prussian design but with a shorter wheelbase to accommodate smaller turntables. Named Meteor and Comet, they operated until 1933 and 1935.

== Design ==
The P 4.1 was a 2'B passenger steam locomotive with a twin-cylinder saturated steam engine (2'B n2). It existed in two variants: the early Musterblatt III-1c and the primary III-1d. The boiler centreline was 2,145 mm above the rails (2,135 mm for III-1c), with a 1,460 mm diameter and 3,900 mm fire-tube length. The boiler heating surface was 117.9 m² (125.5 m² for III-1c), with a 2.3 m² grate area and 12 atm steam pressure.

The driving axles were spaced 2,600 mm apart, the leading bogie axles 2,000 mm, and the distance between the second bogie axle and the first driving axle was 2,800 mm, yielding a 7,400 mm wheelbase. The III-1c had a 2,050 mm bogie axle spacing, a closer bogie-to-driving-axle distance, and a 6,575 mm wheelbase. Axle loads were 14.6 T and 15 T on driving axles and 9 T on bogie axles (III-1c: 14.1 T and 10.5 T, respectively).

The twin-cylinder engine had 460 mm diameter cylinders (430 mm for III-1c) and a 600 mm piston stroke. Valve gear was external Heusinger (internal Allan for III-1c), driving the first driving axle's crankpins. Brakes were fitted on the driving wheels.

Typically, three-axle tenders were used: Musterblatt III-5b (later pr 3T12: 12 m³ water, 5 t coal, 6,250 mm long) or III-5c (pr 3T15: 15 m³ water, 5 t coal, 6,250 mm). Later, four-axle III-5k tenders (pr 2'2'T16: 16 m³ water, 7 t coal, 7,350 mm) were used. The locomotive's length was 17,511 mm with the pr 2'2'T16 tender and 16,411 mm with a three-axle tender.

A 1924 specification noted that a P 4.1 could haul a 160-ton train at 80 km/h, a 310-ton train at 70 km/h, or a 500-ton train at 60 km/h on level track. On gradients (e.g., 2‰), permissible loads and speeds decreased significantly, such as 290 tons at 60 km/h.

== Bibliography ==
- Hütter, Ingo (2009). Die Dampflokomotiven der Baureihen 01 bis 45 der DRG, DRB, DB, und DR (in German). Werl: DGEG Medien. p. 292. ISBN 978-3-937189-45-1.
- Rauter, Herbert (1991). Preußen-Report. Band 4: Naßdampf-Personenzuglokomotiven P 0 – P 4, P 7 [Prussia report. Volume 4: Saturated steam passenger locomotives P 0 – P 4, P 7] (in German). Hermann Merker Verlag. ISBN 3-922404-21-9.
