= Hugo Lentz =

Austrian mechanical engineer (1859–1944)

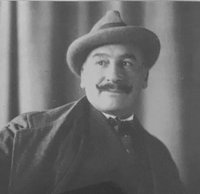
Hugo Lentz

Hugo Lentz (1859–1944) was an Austrian mechanical engineer, born in Cape Colony. He was the inventor of many award-winning improvements to the steam engine.

The correct spelling of his name is Lenz but it has been Anglicised to Lentz in English-speaking countries.

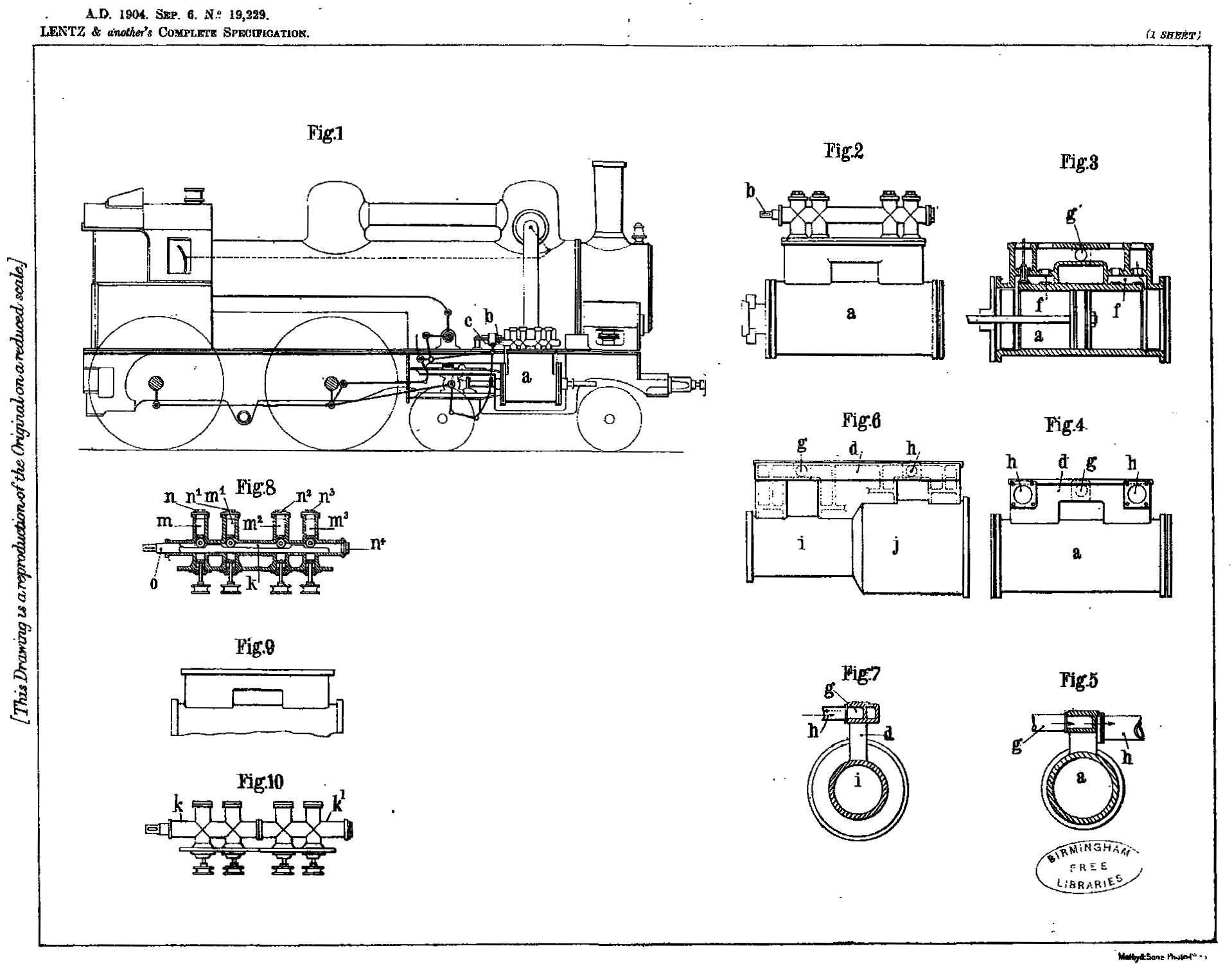

== Life and career ==
Lentz was born on 21 July 1859 in Cape Colony. When he was six years old, his father died and the family returned to relatives in Germany. He became an engineer in the Prussian Navy.

In 1888, Lentz founded his own machine factory in Vienna. At an exposition in honour of Alessandro Volta in Como in 1899, his first steam engine won the first prize. At the Exposition Universelle (1900) in Paris, it won the Grand Prix while Lentz himself was awarded the gold medal.

From 1907, Davey, Paxman & Co, and later the Erie City Iron Works in Pennsylvania built Lentz's steam engines.

In total, Lentz acquired some 2000 patents. He is best known for his steam valve gear with oscillating and rotating cams to actuate poppet valves. He also developed an eponymous form of locomotive boiler, the Lentz boiler, with a corrugated tubular furnace.

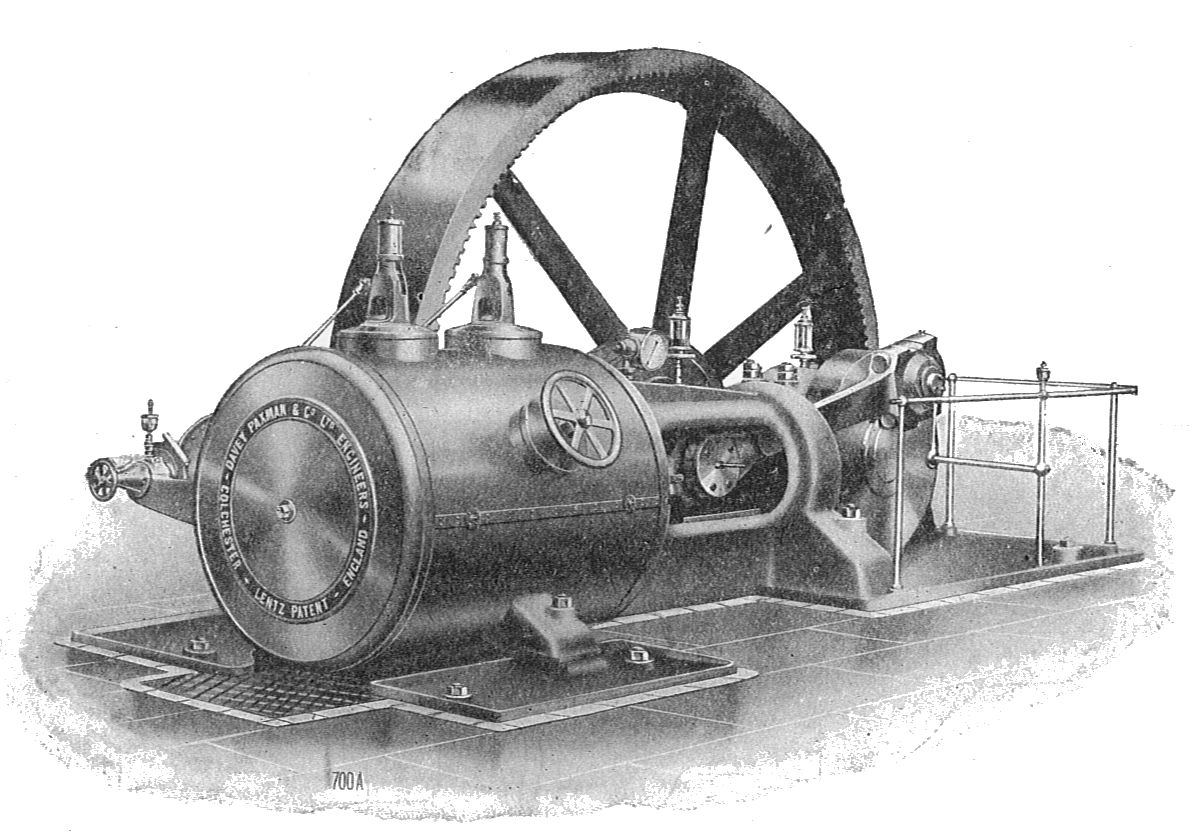
Paxman-Lentz single-cylinder engine

Lentz died on 21 March 1944.
