= Länderbahnen =

State railways of the German Confederation and German Empire

The Länderbahnen (German pronunciation: [ˈlɛndɐˌbaːnən], lit. 'States Railways'; sing. Länderbahn [ˈlɛndɐˌbaːn]) were the various state railways of the German Confederation and the German Empire in the period from about 1840 to 1920, when they were merged into the Deutsche Reichsbahn after the First World War.

== The state railways ==
=== Railways merged into the Deutsche Reichsbahn ===
The seven state railways forming the merger were the:

- Prussian state railways (Preußische Staatseisenbahnen or P.St.E.)
- Royal Bavarian State Railways (Königlich Bayerische Staatseisenbahn or K.Bay.Sts.B.)
- Royal Saxon State Railways (Königlich Sächsische Staatseisenbahnen or K.Sächs.Sts.E.B.)
- Royal Württemberg State Railways (Königlich Württembergische Staatseisenbahn or K.W.St.E.)
- Grand Duchy of Baden State Railways (Großherzoglich Badische Staatseisenbahn or G.Bad.St.E.), 1840–1920
- Grand Duchy of Mecklenburg Friedrich-Franz Railway (Großherzoglich Mecklenburgische Friedrich-Franz-Eisenbahn or M.F.F.E.)
- Grand Duchy of Oldenburg State Railways (Großherzoglich Oldenburgische Staatseisenbahn or G.O.E.), 1867–1920

=== Other state railways ===
Other state railways that existed during this period, but which later folded or were absorbed, included the:

- Royal Hanoverian State Railways (Königlich Hannöversche Staatseisenbahnen or K.H.St.B.), merged with Royal Prussian State Railways (Königlich Preußische Staatseisenbahnen or K.P.St.E.) in 1866
- Nassau State Railway (Herzoglich Nassauische Staatsbahn or H.N.St.B.), merged with the K.P.St.E. in 1866
- Bebra-Hanau Railway (Bebra-Hanauer Eisenbahn), a Kurhessian state railway, merged with the K.P.St.E. in 1866
- Duchy of Brunswick State Railway (Herzoglich Braunschweigische Staatseisenbahn), merged with the K.P.St.E. in 1870
- Anhalt Leopold Railway (Anhaltische Leopoldsbahn), merged with the K.P.St.E. in 1882
- Grand Duchy of Hesse State Railways (Großherzoglich Hessischen Staatseisenbahnen or G.H.St.E.), merged with the K.P.St.E. in 1897 to form the Royal Prussian and Grand Duchy of Hesse State Railway (Königlich Preußische und Großherzoglich Hessischen Staatseisenbahnen or K.P.u.G.H.St.E.)
- Imperial Railways in Alsace-Lorraine (Reichseisenbahn Elsaß-Lothringen), lost to France after the First World War

=== KPEV ===
The so-called Royal Prussian Railway Administration or KPEV did not exist, although some of the rolling stock carried 'KPEV' emblems and the abbreviation is commonly used in railway circles nowadays.

== See also ==
- History of rail transport in Germany
