= Grand Duchy of Oldenburg State Railways =

Railway company

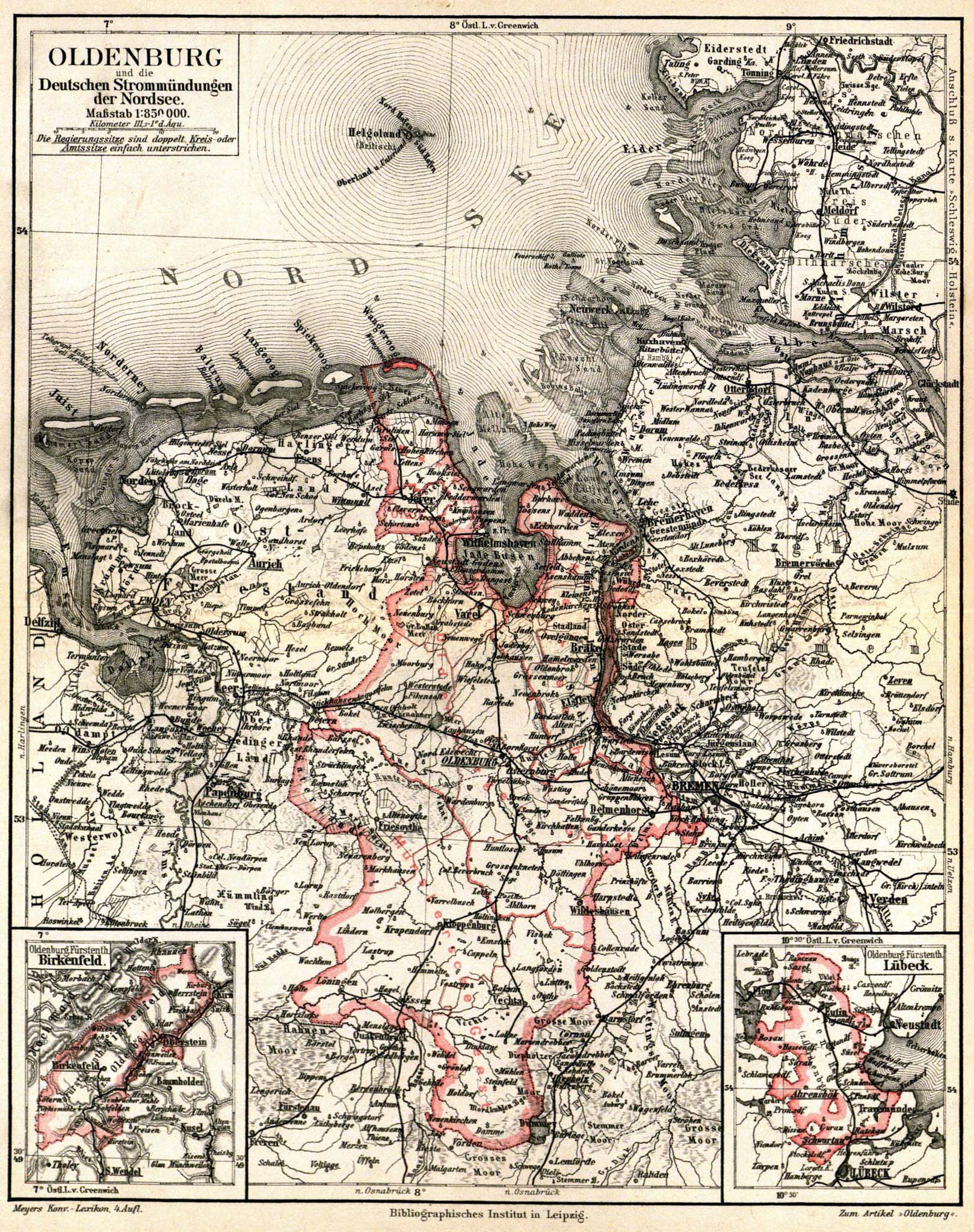
A map of the railway

The Grand Duchy of Oldenburg Railway (Großherzoglich Oldenburgische Eisenbahn or GOE) was the railway company that was run as a state railway for the Grand Duchy of Oldenburg (Großherzogtum Oldenburg), part of the German Empire.

== History ==
Compared with the other states in the German Empire, Oldenburg's first railway line arrived relatively late. In this sparsely populated and economically poor area, the construction of railways appeared for a long while to be unsustainable due to the financial costs. In addition, the various ideas of its neighboring states, Hanover and Prussia prevented railway projects from coming to fruition for a long time.

Finally in 1864 a treaty was agreed between Prussia and Oldenburg over the construction of a railway line from Bremen to Oldenburg. At the same time Prussia committed itself to building a railway line from Heppens – later Wilhelmshaven – to Oldenburg (the Wilhelmshaven–Oldenburg line). The Grand Ducal Railway Commission, set up in 1864, was transferred on 1 April 1867, to the Grand Ducal Railway Division of Oldenburg.

On 17 November 1866, the first section of the route Oldenburg–Delmenhorst was opened; in July 1867 its extension to Bremen followed, and in September of the same year the section from Oldenburg to Heppens was finally completed.

In 1869 the east–west line from Bremen to Oldenburg was extended to what was then Prussian Leer in East Frisia by a line from Oldenburg to Leer with a junction to the Hanoverian Western Railway and, in 1876 by the section from Ihrhove to Nieuweschans with a junction to the Dutch Railways.

In 1871 the town of Jever was linked via Sande (part of the East Frisian Coastal Railway); Brake received a railway connexion in 1873 and Nordenham in 1875. The Grand Duchy of Oldenburg gained an important link to the south in 1876 with the so-called Southern Railway from Oldenburg via Quakenbrück as far as Eversburg on the Osnabrück–Rheine line.

In 1897 the route from Jever to the harbour at Harle, opened in 1888 as the Jever–Carolinensiel railway, was finally taken over by the GOE. At the same time boat services to Wangerooge were started and a narrow gauge railway, the Wangerooge Island Railway laid from the jetty to the town.

In 1920 the GOE was merged into the newly founded Deutsche Reichsbahn. The Oldenburg staff were transferred to the Reichsbahn divisions of Hannover, Hamburg and Münster/Westfalen after the disbandment of the railway division in Oldenburg town. In 1935 a monument was erected in Münster for the former Oldenburg railwaymen.

== See also ==
- Grand Duchy of Oldenburg
- List of Oldenburg locomotives and railbuses
