= Württemberg T 4 =

Württemberg T 4 DRG Class 92.1
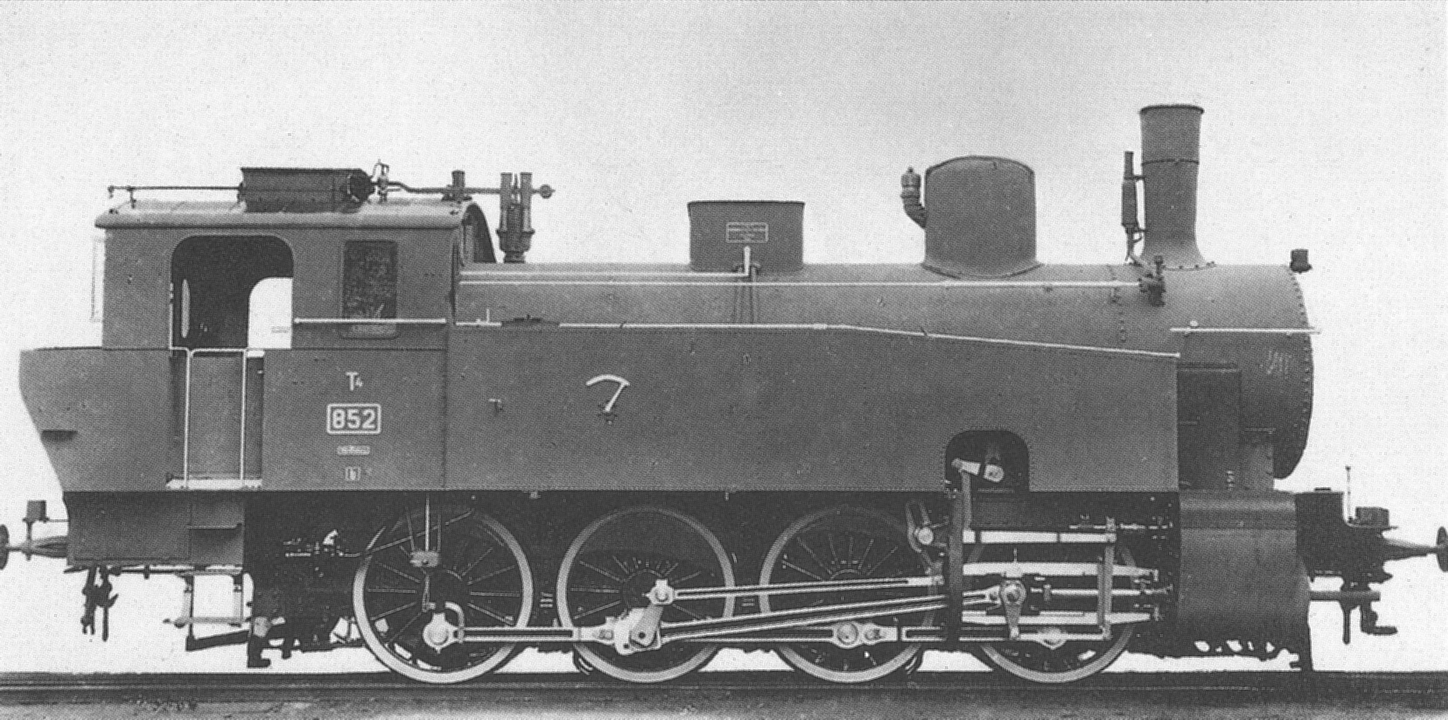
- T4 No. 852 works photo, 1906
Type and origin
- Builder: Maschinenfabrik Esslingen
- Build date: 1906 and 1909
- Total produced: 8
Specifications
- Configuration
  - Whyte: 0-8-0T
  - UIC: D n2t
  - German: Gt 44.16
- Gauge: 1,435 mm (4 ft 8 1/2 in)
- Driver dia.: 1,380 mm (4 ft 6 3/8 in)
- Wheelbase
  - Overall: 4,650 mm (15 ft 3 in)
- Length
  - Over beams: 11,000 mm (36 ft 1 in)
- Height: 4,650 mm (15 ft 3 in)
- Axle load: 16.10 tonnes (15.85 long tons; 17.75 short tons)
- Adhesive weight: 64.50 tonnes (63.48 long tons; 71.10 short tons)
- Empty weight: 49.80 tonnes (49.01 long tons; 54.90 short tons)
- Service weight: 64.50 tonnes (63.48 long tons; 71.10 short tons)
- Fuel capacity: 1.50 t coal
- Water cap.: 6.00 m^{3}
- Boiler
- No. of heating tubes: 266
- Heating tube length: 4,000 mm (13 ft 1 1/2 in)
- Boiler pressure: 14.0 kg/cm^{2} (1.37 MPa; 199 psi)
- Heating surface
  - Firebox: 2.08 m^{2} (22.4 sq ft)
  - Radiative: 9.70 m^{2} (104.4 sq ft)
  - Tubes: 133.70 m^{2} (1,439.1 sq ft)
  - Evaporative: 143.40 m^{2} (1,543.5 sq ft)
- Cylinders: 2
- Cylinder size: 530 mm (20 7/8 in)
- Piston stroke: 612 mm (24 1/8 in)
- Valve gear: Walschaerts (Heusinger)
- Loco brake: Screw brake, counterpressure brake
Performance figures
- Maximum speed: 52 km/h (32 mph)
Career
- Numbers: Nr. 851–858; DRG 92 101–92 108
- Retired: by 1948

The Württemberg T 4 was a class of German, eight-coupled, goods train, tank locomotive operated by the Royal Württemberg State Railways.

When the T 3 locomotives were no longer capable of banking services on the Geislinger Steige, a locomotive was designed that was to develop twice the power. Because no more locomotives were needed for duties on the ramps, only eight were produced, of which five were supplied in 1906 and three in 1909. In their day they were the heaviest eight-coupled locomotives in Germany.

In designing the boiler, special emphasis had been laid on a large steam space and a low-lying firebox crown so that banking could be achieved with refilling with water, which led to a reduction in boiler pressure and a resultant drop in performance.

In order to reduce wear and tear on the tyres and brake shoes during descents, the engines were fitted with Riggenbach counter-pressure brakes.

In 1925 the Deutsche Reichsbahn took over all eight locomotives and grouped them into DRG Class 92.1 in their numbering plan. After the Second World War they ended up in the Deutsche Bundesbahn, where they were retired between 1946 and 1948 or sold as industrial locomotives.

== See also ==
- Royal Württemberg State Railways
- List of Württemberg locomotives and railbuses
