= Württemberg Hz =

Württemberg Hz DRG Class 97.5
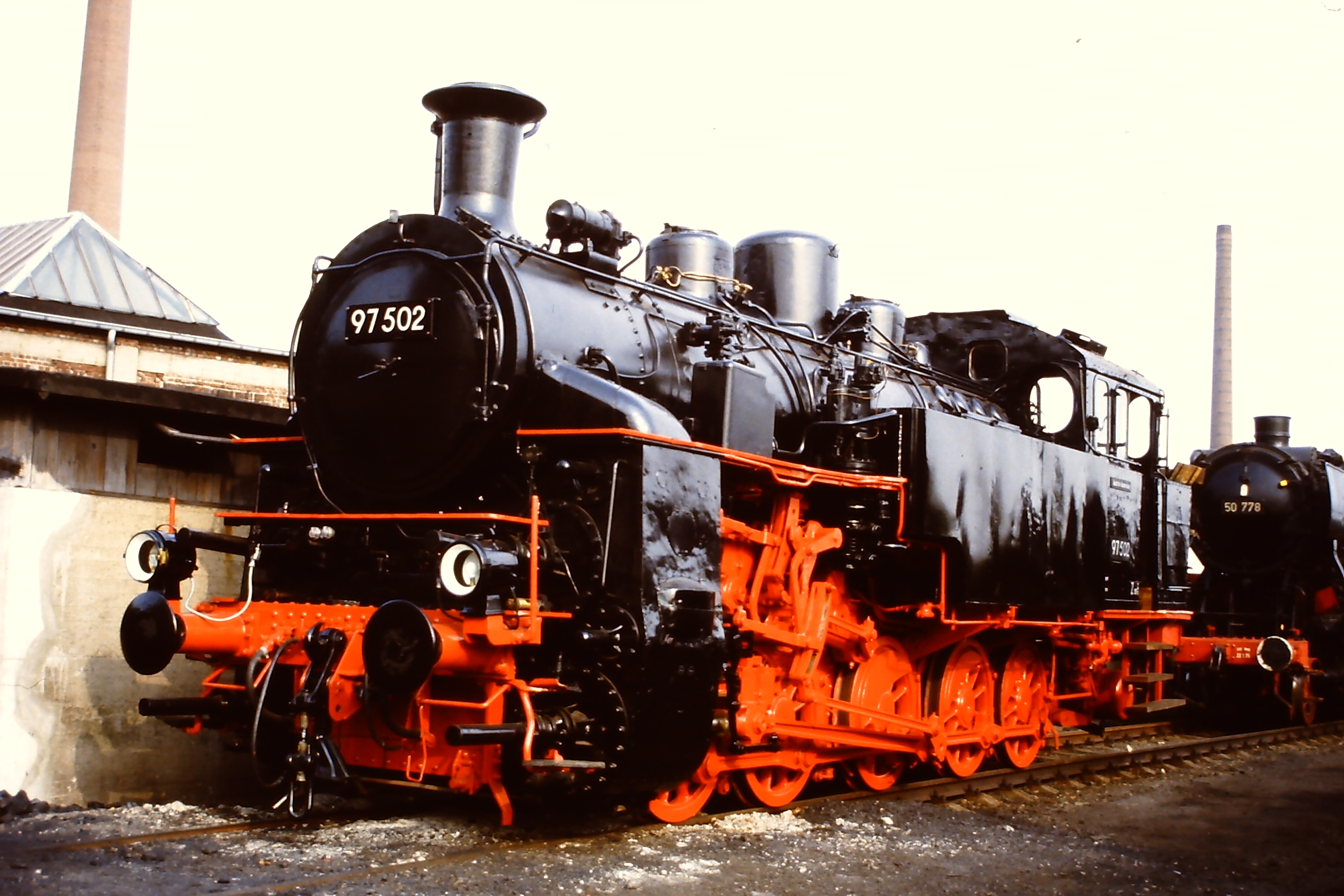
Type and origin
- Builder: Esslingen
- Build date: 1922, 1925
- Total produced: 4
Specifications
- Configuration
  - Whyte: 0-10-0T
  - German: ZZ 55.15
- Gauge: 1,435 mm (4 ft 8 1/2 in) standard gauge
- Driver dia.: 1,150 mm (45 1/4 in)
- Rack system: Riggenbach
- Length
  - Over beams: 11,870 mm (38 ft 11 1/4 in)
- Axle load: 15.0 tonnes (14.8 long tons; 16.5 short tons)
- Adhesive weight: 74.9 tonnes (73.7 long tons; 82.6 short tons)
- Empty weight: 62.2 tonnes (61.2 long tons; 68.6 short tons)
- Service weight: 74.9 tonnes (73.7 long tons; 82.6 short tons)
- Fuel capacity: 4.0 t (3.9 long tons; 4.4 short tons) coal
- Water cap.: 7.0 m^{3} (1,500 imp gal; 1,800 US gal)
- Boiler pressure: 14 bar (1,400 kPa; 200 psi)
- Heating surface
  - Firebox: 2.50 m^{2} (26.9 sq ft)
  - Radiative: 12.60 m^{2} (135.6 sq ft)
  - Evaporative: 117.10 m^{2} (1,260.5 sq ft)
- Superheater
  - Heating area: 42.30 m^{2} (455.3 sq ft)
- Cylinder size: 560 mm (22 1/16 in)
- Piston stroke: 560 mm (22 1/16 in)
- Cogwheel drive cylinder bore: 560 mm (22 1/16 in)
- Cogwheel drive piston stroke: 560 mm (22 1/16 in)
- Loco brake: Hik GP, various special types
Performance figures
- Maximum speed: Adhesion: 50 km/h (31 mph); Rack: 10 km/h (6.2 mph)
- Indicated power: 610 kW (830 PS; 820 hp) / 625 kW (850 PS; 838 hp)
Career
- Numbers: DRG 97 501–504
- Retired: 1962

The Württemberg Hz were 0-10-0 rack and adhesion steam locomotives, initially developed by the Royal Württemberg State Railways (Königlich Württembergische Staats-Eisenbahnen), but delivered to the Deutsche Reichsbahn-Gesellschaft (DRG) in the mid-1920s.

== Design ==
The locomotives had a Winterthur cogwheel drive with one lower and one upper pair of cylinders. On the level, they ran like normal steam locomotives using the lower, higher pressure, pair of cylinders driving on the third coupled axle. Before entering the rack section the upper drive was started using live steam. At the same time the rpm was matched to the running speed so that entry into the rack section could be achieved smoothly. Once the cogwheel had engaged the rack, the exhaust from the lower cylinders was routed to the upper, lower pressure, ones using a change valve and was expelled from the chimney. The locomotive now worked as a compound.

The cylinders of the adhesion and cogwheel drives have the same diameters (Ø 560 mm). The difference in volume (after expulsion from the adhesion system, the steam doubles its volume) is compensated for because the cogwheel drive turns twice as fast. The driving cogwheel is housed in a special frame, that lies above the second and third axle. The higher cogwheel drive and the lower cogwheel are coupled via an intermediate gear with a transmission ratio of 1:2.43.

The boilers were given steel fireboxes and the frame was reinforced, especially in the area of the drive. The outermost axles, which had side play, were given return springs to minimise hunting.

== Operations ==
The DRG organised these tank locomotives into Class 97.5 in their numbering plan. They were employed on the 1-in-10 Honau–Lichtenstein rack railway, 2.2 km long, which employed a Riggenbach-Klose rack system. Apart from 97 503, which was destroyed during the Second World War, remained there until their retirement in 1961. Number 97 502 returned to its producer, the Maschinenfabrik Esslingen (now owned by Daimler-Benz) at Esslingen am Neckar and was set up as a monument there, before being moved to Bochum-Dahlhausen Railway Museum.

From 1952 locomotives 97 502 and 504 were modernised in the Maschinenfabrik Esslingen in order to raise their running speed in both adhesion and cogwheel working.

To increase their radius of action numbers 97 501, 502 and 504, the coal tank capacity was increased by 1 tonne.

== Preserved ==
Of the four machines built, three have been preserved:

97501 in Reutlingen (information at www.zhl.de)
97502 at the Bochum-Dahlhausen Railway Museum in Bochum-Dahlhausen
97504 at the Deutsches Technikmuseum Berlin

== See also ==
- Royal Württemberg State Railways
- Deutsche Reichsbahn
- List of DRG locomotives and railbuses
- List of Württemberg locomotives and railbuses
