= Württemberg A =

Württemberg A DRG Class 34.81
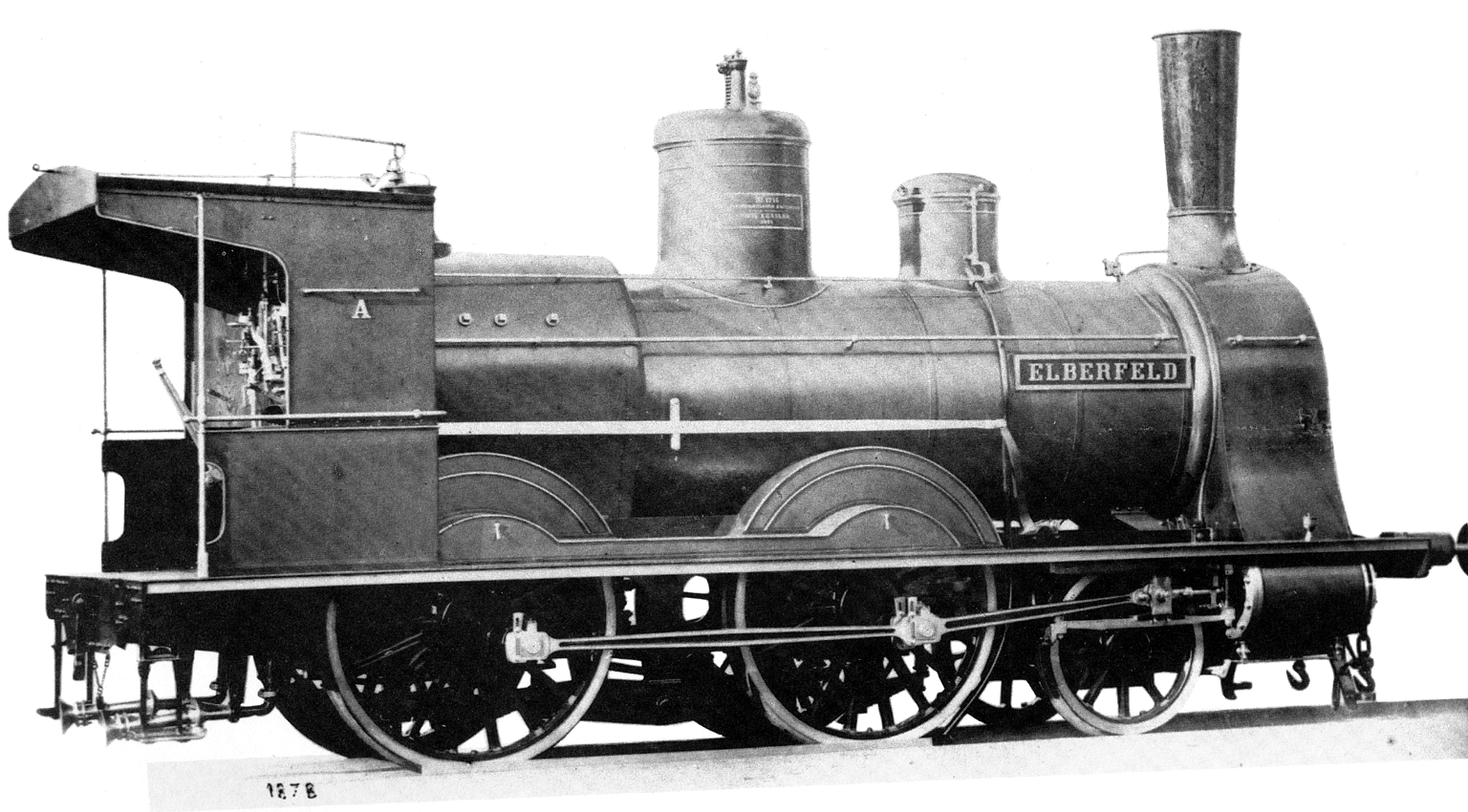
- No. 325 ELBERFELD (Esslingen 1715 of 1878)
Type and origin
- Builder: Maschinenfabrik Esslingen
- Build date: 1878–1891
- Total produced: 25
Specifications
- Configuration
  - Whyte: 2-4-0
- Gauge: 1,435 mm (4 ft 8 1/2 in)
- Leading dia.: 1,045 mm (3 ft 5 1/8 in)
- Driver dia.: 1,650 mm (5 ft 5 in)
- Length
  - Over beams: 14,092 mm (46 ft 2 3/4 in)
- Adhesive weight: 26.3 tonnes (25.9 long tons; 29.0 short tons)
- Service weight: 39.3 tonnes (38.7 long tons; 43.3 short tons)
- Water cap.: 10 m^{3} (2,200 imp gal; 2,600 US gal)
- Boiler pressure: 10 or 12 kgf/cm^{2} (981 or 1,180 kPa; 142 or 171 lbf/in^{2})
- Heating surface
  - Firebox: 1.60 m^{2} (17.2 sq ft)
  - Evaporative: 105.30 m^{2} (1,133.4 sq ft)
- Cylinder size: 420 mm (16 9/16 in)
- Piston stroke: 560 mm (22 1/16 in)
Performance figures
- Maximum speed: 80 km/h (50 mph)
Career
- Numbers: DRG 34 8101–8102
- Retired: 1924

Then locomotives of Württemberg Class A were express train steam locomotives operated by the Royal Württemberg State Railways. They were built from 1878 by the Maschinenfabrik Esslingen engineering works.

In the mid-1860s the Württemberg State Railways turned away from the 4-4-0 American-influenced locomotives and went back to 2-4-0 locomotives, because they were cheaper to buy and maintain. They even converted some 4-4-0s to 2-4-0 engines.

Because these locomotives had been built over many years, the individual engines differed from one another in certain details and, for example, the boiler pressure was increased from 10 to 12 kgf/cm^{2} (981 to 1,180 kPa; 142 to 171 lbf/in^{2}). The engines had a tender of Class 2 T 10 and were recognisable by their large steam dome, that was located just behind the only slightly higher chimney.

Two locomotives ended up in the final DRG renumbering plan of 1925 as the DRG Class 34.81. Number 34 8101 was the former 336, that in 1896 had been converted from a Württemberg Aa. Number 34 8102, formerly 363, was by contrast newly built in 1891. Both locomotives were retired in 1925.

== See also ==
- Royal Württemberg State Railways
- List of Württemberg locomotives and railbuses
