= Württemberg T 5 =

Württemberg T 5 DRG Class 75.0
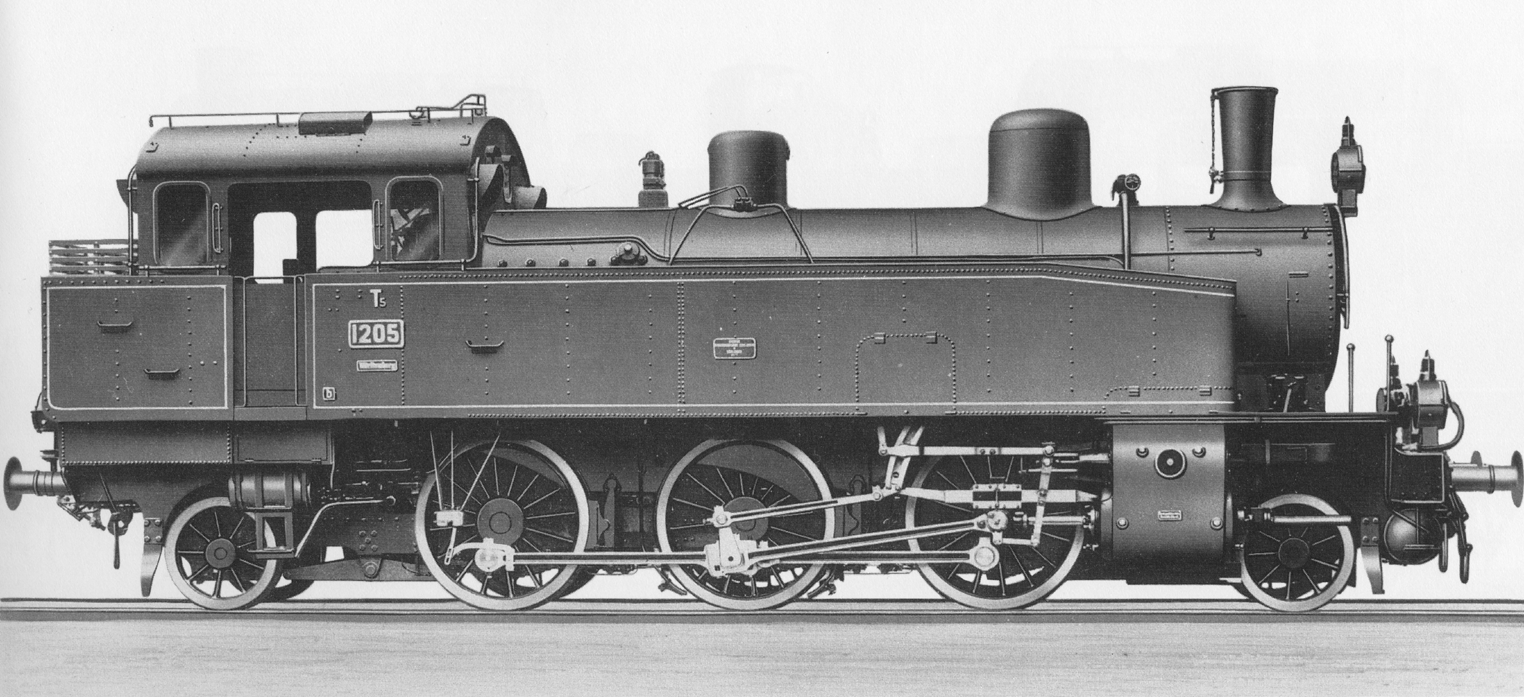
- Works' photograph of No. 1205 (ME 3552 of 1910)
Type and origin
- Builder: Maschinenfabrik Esslingen, Maschinenbau-Gesellschaft Heilbronn
- Build date: 1910–1920
- Total produced: 96
Specifications
- Configuration
  - Whyte: 2-6-2T
  - German: Pt 35.15
- Gauge: 1,435 mm (4 ft 8 1/2 in)
- Leading dia.: 943 mm (3 ft 1 1/8 in)
- Driver dia.: 1,450 mm (4 ft 9 1/8 in)
- Trailing dia.: 943 mm (3 ft 1 1/8 in)
- Length
  - Over beams: 12,200 mm (40 ft 1/4 in)
- Axle load: 14.7 tonnes (14.5 long tons; 16.2 short tons)
- Adhesive weight: 43.9 tonnes (43.2 long tons; 48.4 short tons)
- Service weight: 69.5 tonnes (68.4 long tons; 76.6 short tons)
- Boiler
- Heating tube length: 4,100 mm (13 ft 5 1/2 in)
- Boiler pressure: 12 kg/cm^{2} (1,180 kPa; 171 psi)
- Heating surface
  - Firebox: 1.93 m^{2} (20.8 sq ft)
  - Evaporative: 110.08 m^{2} (1,184.9 sq ft)
- Superheater
  - Heating area: 33.68 m^{2} (362.5 sq ft)
- Cylinder size: 500 mm (19 11/16 in)
- Piston stroke: 612 mm (24 1/8 in)
Performance figures
- Maximum speed: 50–75 km/h (31–47 mph)
- Indicated power: 880 PS (647 kW; 868 hp)
Career
- Numbers: K.W.St.E.: 1201–1296; DRG: 75 001 – 75 093
- Retired: 1963

In 1908 the Royal Württemberg State Railways placed an order with the Maschinenfabrik Esslingen for a powerful passenger tank locomotive. Classified as the Württemberg T 5, this superheated engine was designed for duties on Württemberg's main and branch lines and had the very long fixed wheelbase of 4,000 mm in order to give the locomotive smooth riding qualities. By 1920 a total of 96 engines had been manufactured. In 1919, three examples had to be give to France; the remaining 93 were taken over by the Deutsche Reichsbahn and 89 survived into the Deutsche Bundesbahn fleet. From 1959 they began to be retired. The last one was taken out of service in 1963 and was kept at Aulendorf as a museum engine until 1968. This last example was then scrapped as well.

The Württemberg T 5 proved itself very well and was occasionally even used to haul expresses on the Gäubahn between Immendingen and Stuttgart. No locomotives have been preserved.

== See also ==
- Royal Württemberg State Railways
- List of Württemberg locomotives and railbuses
