= Württemberg T 6 =

Württemberg T 6 DRG Class 92.0
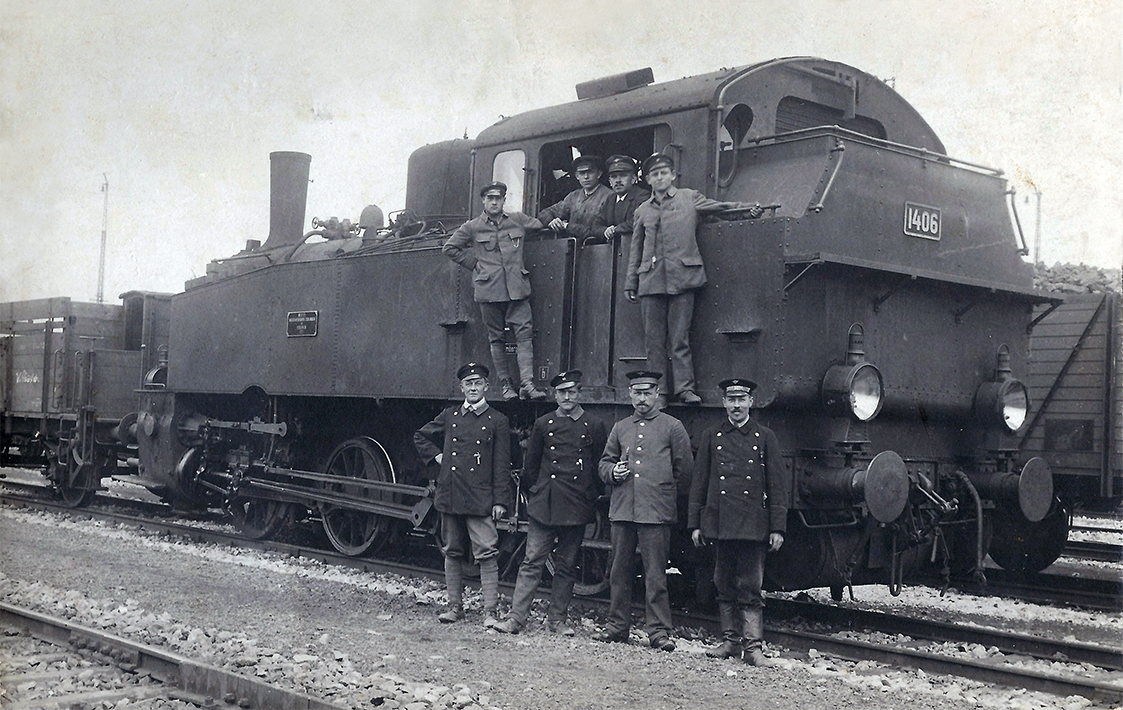
Type and origin
- Power type: Steam
- Builder: Maschinenfabrik Esslingen
- Build date: 1916–1918
- Total produced: 12
Specifications
- Configuration
  - Whyte: 0-8-0T
  - UIC: D h2t
- Gauge: 1,435 mm (4 ft 8 1/2 in)
- Driver dia.: 1,150 mm (3 ft 9 1/4 in)
- Length: 10.60 m (34 ft 9 1/4 in)
- Axle load: 15.0 tonnes (14.8 long tons; 16.5 short tons)
- Loco weight: 60.0 tonnes (59.1 long tons; 66.1 short tons)
- Firebox
  - Grate area: 1.50 m^{2} (16.1 sq ft)
- Heating surface: 71.40 m^{2} (768.5 sq ft)
- Superheater
  - Heating area: 44.00 m^{2} (473.6 sq ft)
- Cylinders: Two
- Cylinder size: 500 mm × 560 mm (19 11/16 in × 22 1/16 in)
- Train brakes: Westinghouse compressed-air brake
Performance figures
- Maximum speed: 50 km/h (31 mph)
- Power output: 368 kW (490 ihp)
Career
- Operators: Königlich Württembergischen Staats-Eisenbahnen; Chemins de fer de l'État; Deutsche Reichsbahn
- Class: K.W.St.E: T 6; DR: 92.0 / Gt 44.15
- Numbers: K.W.St.E: 1401–1412; État: 40-903; DR: 90 001 – 90 011

The Württemberg T 6 was a German, 0-8-0T, goods train, tank locomotive operated by the Royal Württemberg State Railways.

The T 6 was specially procured for heavy shunting duties and was mainly used in the Stuttgart area.

Locomotive number 1407 was handed over to the French Chemins de fer de l'État in 1919 and allocated number 40-903. The Deutsche Reichsbahn took over the remaining eleven locomotives and grouped them into DRG Class 92.0 within their numbering plan. Already by 1945 a number of the locomotives had been sold to private railways. Only number 92 004 ended up in the Deutsche Bundesbahn, who sold it too, in 1950, to a private railway.

== See also ==
- Royal Württemberg State Railways
- List of Württemberg locomotives and railbuses
