= Württemberg AD =

German steam locomotive

Württemberg AD/ADh DRG Class 13.16/13.17
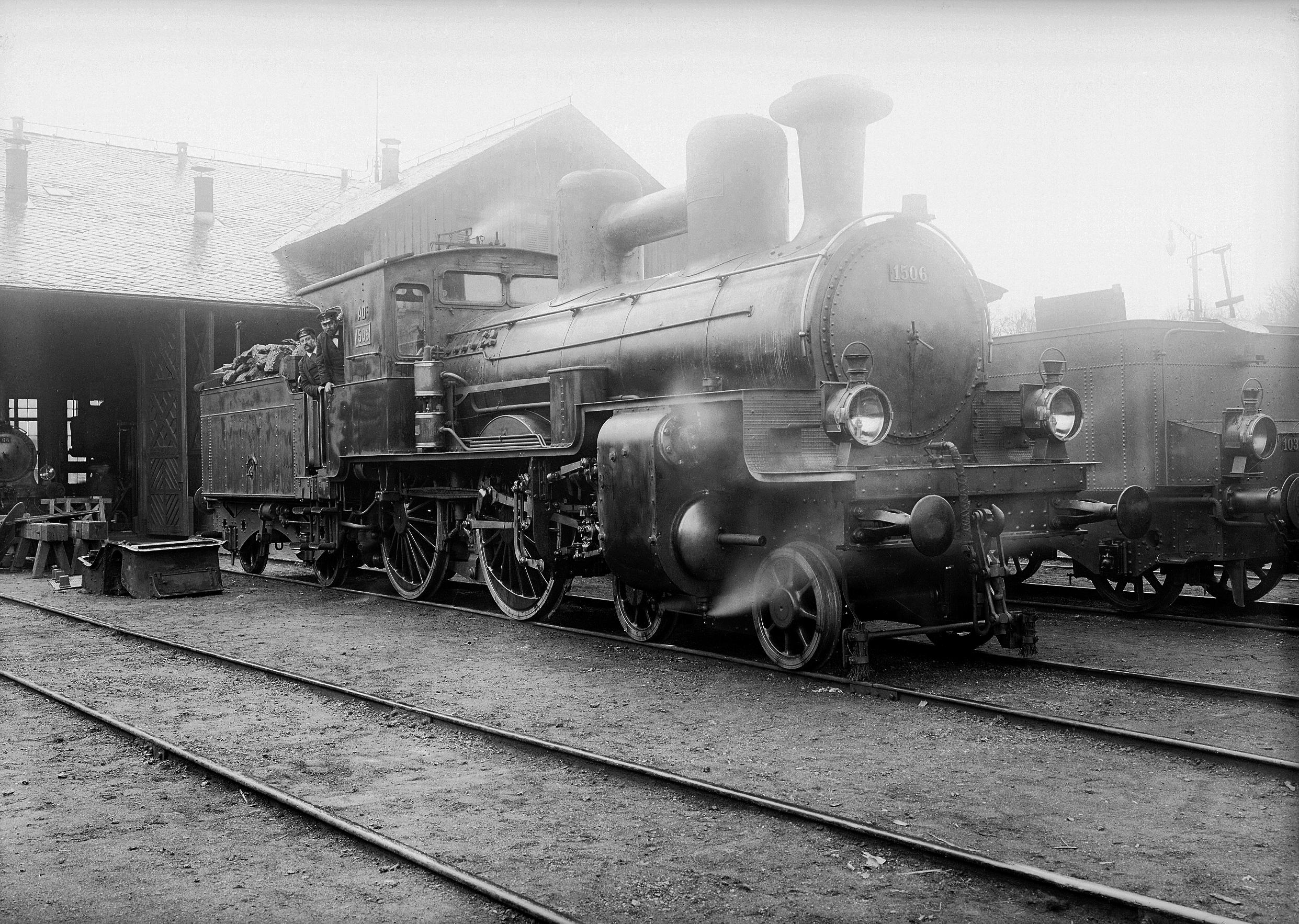
- 1506 at Tübingen in March 1905
Type and origin
- Builder: Maschinenfabrik Esslingen
- Build date: 1899–1909
- Total produced: 115
Specifications
- Configuration
  - Whyte: 4-4-0
- Leading dia.: 850 mm (33 1/2 in)
- Driver dia.: 1,800 mm (70 7/8 in)
- Length
  - Over beams: 15,427 mm (50 ft 7 1/4 in)
- Axle load: 14.6 tonnes (14.4 long tons; 16.1 short tons)
- Adhesive weight: 29.2 tonnes (28.7 long tons; 32.2 short tons)
- Service weight: 50.2 tonnes (49.4 long tons; 55.3 short tons)
- Water cap.: 10.0 or 15.5 m^{3} (2,200 or 3,400 imp gal; 2,600 or 4,100 US gal)
- Boiler pressure: AD: 14 kg/cm^{2} (1.37 MPa; 199 psi); ADh: 12 kg/cm^{2} (1.18 MPa; 171 psi)
- Heating surface
  - Firebox: 2.00 m^{2} (21.5 sq ft)
  - Evaporative: 129.10 m^{2} (1,389.6 sq ft)
- Cylinders: Two
- Cylinder size: ADh: 490 mm (19 5/16 in)
- High-pressure cylinder: AD: 450 mm (17 11/16 in)
- Low-pressure cylinder: AD: 670 mm (26 3/8 in)
- Piston stroke: 560 mm (22 1/16 in)
Performance figures
- Maximum speed: 100 km/h (62 mph)
Career
- Numbers: AD: KWStE 451–500, 1501–1538; DRG 13 1601–1624; ADh: KWStE 1541–1557; DRG 13 1701–1714
- Retired: 1932

The Württemberg AD was a German steam locomotive built for the Royal Württemberg State Railways. It was an express train engine with a 4-4-0 wheel arrangement and was built from 1899 by the Maschinenfabrik Esslingen ('Esslingen Engineering Works'). Up to that point the railway only had increasingly elderly locomotives with a 2-4-0 configuration.

The vehicles were equipped with a two-cylinder, compound engine. The most striking feature was the large, horizontal pipe connecting the two steam domes. Ninety eight engines of this class were built by 1907; they initially had flat slide valves, but from 1903 piston valves were installed.

In 1907 two locomotives were tested with two-cylinder, superheated steam engines. This reduced the boiler overpressure to 12 kg/cm^{2} (1.18 MPa; 171 psi) and generated an improvement in performance of about 20%. As a result, 17 more locomotives were built to this configuration up to 1909 and were designated as Class ADh.

Both classes began to be retired in the early 1920s.

The Deutsche Reichsbahn took over 24 of the compound locomotives as DRG Class 13.16 with numbers 13 1601 to 13 1624, and 14 superheated locomotives as DRG Class 13.17 with numbers 13 1701 to 13 1714. The first ones were retired in 1928, the last in 1932.

The locomotives were equipped with Württemberg wü 2 T 10 and wü 3 T 15,5 tenders.

== See also ==
- Royal Württemberg State Railways
- List of Württemberg locomotives and railbuses
