= Württemberg B and B2 =

Württemberg B/B2
Type and origin
- Builder: Esslingen
- Build date: 1868–1878
- Total produced: 86
Specifications
- Configuration
  - Whyte: 2-4-0
  - UIC: 1B n2
- Gauge: 1,435 mm (4 ft 8 1/2 in)
- Leading dia.: 930 mm (3 ft 5/8 in)
- Driver dia.: 1,530 mm (5 ft 1/4 in)
- Length
  - Over beams: ~ 13,120 mm (43 ft 1/2 in)
- Axle load: 11.0 tonnes (10.8 long tons; 12.1 short tons)
- Adhesive weight: 20.0 tonnes (19.7 long tons; 22.0 short tons)
- Service weight: 29.2 tonnes (28.7 long tons; 32.2 short tons)
- Water cap.: 6.5 m^{3} (1,400 imp gal; 1,700 US gal)
- Boiler pressure: 9 kgf/cm^{2} (883 kPa; 128 lbf/in^{2})
- Heating surface
  - Firebox: 0.98 m^{2} (10.5 sq ft)
  - Evaporative: 102.58 m^{2} (1,104.2 sq ft)
- Cylinder size: 408 mm (16 1/16 in)
- Piston stroke: 561 mm (22 1/16 in)

The Württemberg Class B and Class B2 engines were steam locomotives with the Royal Württemberg State Railways (Königlich Württembergische Staats-Eisenbahnen) first built in 1868 by the Maschinenfabrik Esslingen ('Esslingen engineering works') in Esslingen in the former Kingdom of Württemberg in southern Germany.

The engines had a Crampton boiler, an inside Allan valve gear and, for the first time in Württemberg, a Prüsmann chimney. They were equipped with 2 T 6.5 tenders.

== See also ==
- List of DRG locomotives and railbuses
- List of Württemberg locomotives and railbuses
