= List of Württemberg locomotives and railbuses =

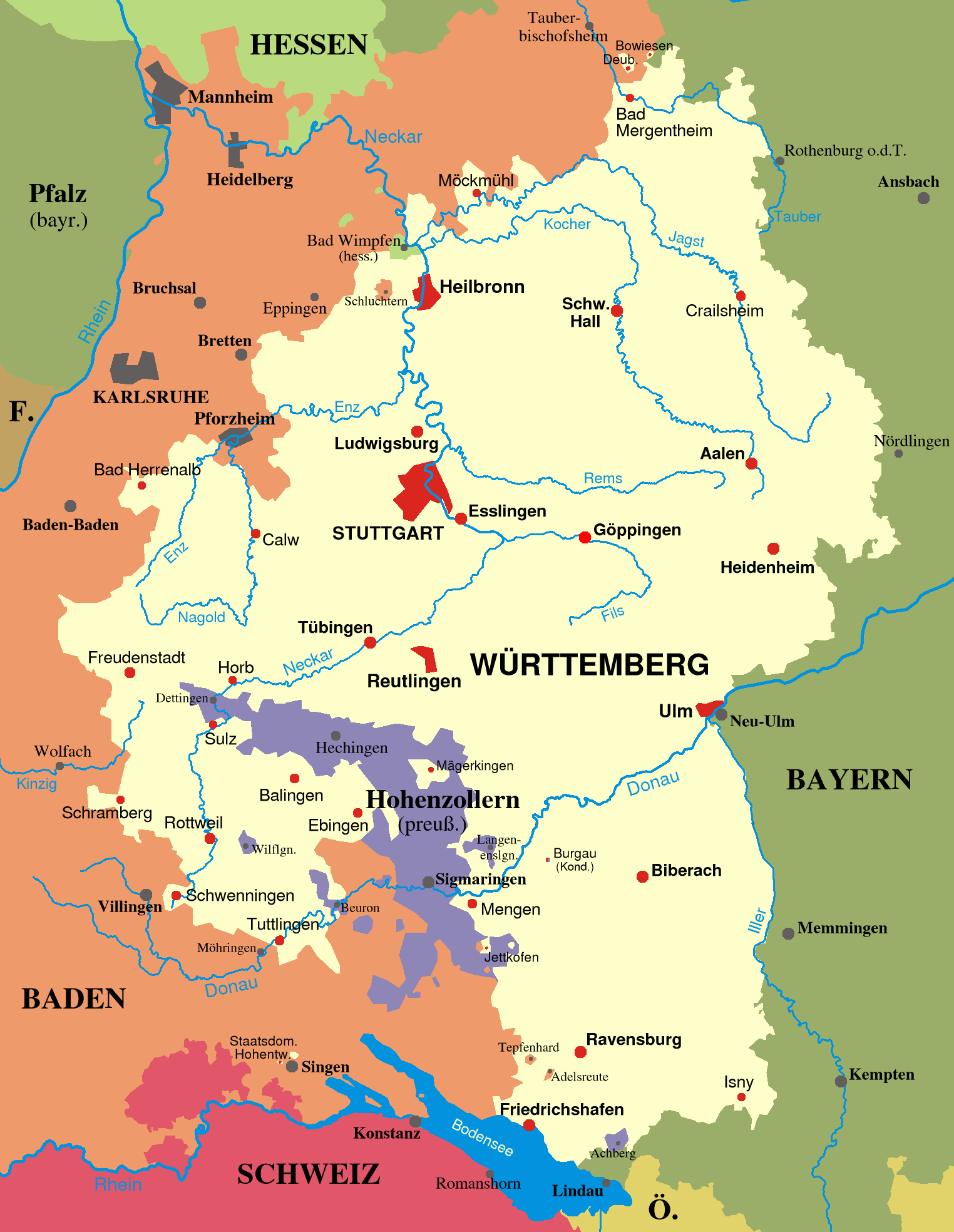
Kingdom of Württemberg as it existed from the end of the Napoleonic Wars to the end of World War I.

This list covers the locomotives and railbuses operated by the Royal Württemberg State Railways (Königlich Württembergische Staats-Eisenbahnen), the national railway company of Württemberg, a state in southwest Germany that was part of the German Empire. In 1920 the Royal Württemberg State Railways, along with the other German state railways (Länderbahnen), were merged into the Deutsche Reichsbahn.

== Locomotive classification ==
The national flag of the Kingdom of Württemberg

The Württemberg state railway first divided its locomotives into classes in 1845. This first categorisation into classes I to VII was based on the order in which individual vehicles were procured.

The scheme proved to be unworkable in practice, so in 1858 a new system was introduced as follows:

- A - Light express and fast-stopping train locomotives
- B - Heavy express and fast-stopping train locomotives
- C - Light passenger train locomotives
- D - Heavy passenger train locomotives
- E - Light goods train locomotives
- F – Heavy goods train locomotives
- T - Tank locomotives

In several cases the previous classes were simply redesignated. In other cases new locomotives and rebuilds were grouped together into one class despite being of different designs. Over the course of time, the shortcomings of the system became apparent. In particular, the division of locomotives into 'light' and 'heavy' groups was unfortunate. The classification scheme was also no longer sufficient for new locomotives. As a result, it was changed slightly in 1892. On retirement, classes that became 'free' were used again.

- A to E - Passenger train locomotives
- F to K - Goods train locomotives
- T - Tank locomotives

Individual classes were differentiated by means of lower case letters in order to be able to indicate certain characteristics, as well as by Arabic numerals to distinguish the individual designs.

- a - Older locomotives
- aa - Very old, ready for retirement
- c - Compounds (Verbundtriebwerk)
- d - duplex (double drive = Mallet)
- h - Superheated locomotive
- n - Branch line locomotive
- z - Rack railway locomotive
- s - Narrow gauge locomotive, 1,000 mm (3 ft 3 3/8 in) gauge
- ss - Narrow gauge locomotive, 750 mm (2 ft 5 1/2 in) gauge

Furthermore, several special abbreviations were introduced, such as KL for small locomotives, DW for steam railbuses, BW for petrol railbuses and AW for accumulator cars.

Württemberg locomotives were given names up to 1896. Subjects for locomotive names were generally geographical features (towns and rivers). Very often, locomotives were given names from their area of operations. On being transferred elsewhere, their names were usually changed.

In addition to names, locomotives were also given numbers. Up to 1890, they were sequentially numbered from 1 - 377. From that time onwards, newly procured locomotives in each class were given a special group of numbers, generally one hundred, beginning at 401.

On rebuilding, locomotives were organised into new classes, but the individual locos each retained their old operating numbers.

== Steam locomotives ==
=== Early locomotives for all traffic types ===
The majority of these locomotives were rebuilt between 1867 and 1893. None were given operating numbers by the Deutsche Reichsbahn.

Class (to 1858)	Class (from 1858)	Railway number(s)	Quantity	Year(s) of manufacture	Type	Remarks
I		1–3	3	1845	2′B n2	Built by Norris (USA), Retired by 1861
II		4–6	3	1845	1′B n2	Built by Baldwin (USA), sold in 1854 to the SCB
III	C (old); D (old)	7–29, 31, 33–34, 38–52	41	1846–1853	2′B n2	In 1858 some classified as C, some as D
IV	E (Alb)	30, 32, 35–37	5	1849–1851	C n2	So-called "Alb" locomotives; first axle uncoupled in 1856 (1B n2) and replaced by a bogie in 1859 (2′B n2); no. 32 Ulm rebuilt in 1869 into a tank locomotive (2′B n2t)
V	D (old)	53–57	5	1854	2′B n2	
VI	A (old)	58–63, 74–77, 96–97	12	1854–1860	2′B n2	
VII	D (old)	1"–6", 9", 10", 64–73, 90–95, 98–111, 120–124, 144–151	51	1856–1861	2′B n2	
	E (old)	78–89, 112–119, 125–129	25	1859–1863	2′B n2	4 units sold in 1872 to the Imperial Railways in Alsace-Lorraine
	B (old)	140–143, 178–179	6	1865–1868	2′B n2	Bogie of no. 140 Wien experimentally replaced in 1890 by radially-swinging leading wheels (1′B n2)

=== Passenger and express train locomotives ===
Class	Railway number(s)	DRG number(s)	Quantity	Year(s) of manufacture	Type	Remarks
B/B2 to 1869: D	180–183, 208–251, 270–295, 306–317		86	1868–1878	1B n2	Nos. 180–183 classified on delivery as D, regrouped into class B in 1869, reclassified in 1892 as B2
A from 1892: Aa	69", 121", 318–327, 334–336		15	1878–1888	1B n2	Older variety of the Class A 2-4-0 (1B) locomotives; in 1896–1905 13 units were converted to the new design and classified as A again
A	337–341, 363–367	34 8102	10	1888–1891	1B n2	
Ac	342–362, 368–377	34 8201–8209	31	1889–1897	1B n2v	
E	401–410		10	1892	1′B1′ n3v	
D	421–434		14	1898–1905	2′C n4v	
AD	451–500, 1501–1538	13 1601–1624	88	1899–1907	2′B n2v	
ADh	1541–1557	13 1701–1714	17	1907–1909	2′B h2	Superheated version of Class AD; nos. 1541–1542 delivered as 1538–1539
C	2001–2041	18 101–137	41	1909–1921	2′C1′ h4v	

=== Goods train locomotives ===
Class	Railway number(s)	DRG number(s)	Quantity	Year(s) of manufacture	Type	Remarks
F from 1892: Fa	8"...127", 130–139, 152–171, 184–207, 252–269, 296–305, 328–333		98	1864–1880	C n2	96 units rebuilt in 1890–1910 into classes Fa (rebuild) and F2 (rebuild)
F 2	601–606		6	1889	C n2	
Fc	611–735	53 801–865	125	1890–1909	C n2v	
G	801–805		5	1892	E n3v	So-called "Elephants", with Klose steering
F 1c	501–506		6	1893	C n2v	With Klose steering
F 1	511–538		28	1894–1896	C n2	With Klose steering and inside cylinders
H	811–818	57 301–304	8	1905–1909	E n2v	
Hh	821–846	57 401–417	26	1909–1920	E h2	Superheated version of Class H
K	1801–1815	59 001–015	15	1917–1919	1′F h4v	
K	(1816–1844)	59 016–044	29	1923–1924	1′F h4v	Follow-on order, wholly or partly with DRG numbers delivered
G12	1901–1935	58 501–535	35	1919–1920	1′E h3	Same as Prussian G 12
G12	Cassel 5761–5768	58 536–543	8	1922	1′E h3	Follow-on order, delivered with Prussian railway numbers

=== Tank locomotives ===
Class	Railway number(s)	DRG number(s)	Quantity	Year(s) of manufacture	Type	Remarks
B (Krauss)	172–177		6	1867–1868	B n2t	Krauss type
T 3	885–994	89 301–410	110	1891–1913	C n2t	Nos. 993–994 delivered as B1 n2t 998–999, rebuilt into C n2t in 1894 and renumbered as 995–996, renumbered again in 1896 to 993–994
T 3	996–999	89 411	4	1894–1896	C n2t	With Klose steering, also classified as T3L; no. 996 ordered as 1000, but delivered as 996
T	1001–1010	88 7401	10	1896–1904	B n2t	No. 1001 ordered as 1000, but delivered as 1001
T 9	1101–1110	91 2001–2010	10	1906–1907	1′C n2t	Same as Prussian T 9^{3}
T 4	851–858	92 101–108	8	1906–1909	D n2t	
T 5	1201–1296	75 001–093	96	1910–1917	1′C1′ h2t	
T 6	1401–1412	92 001–011	12	1916–1918	D h2t	
T 18	1121–1140	78 146–165	20	1919	2′C2′ h2t	Same as Prussian T 18
T 14	1441–1460, 1461–1479	93 795–814, 93 832–850	39	1921–1922	1′D1′ h2t	Same as Prussian T 14^{1}
Tn	1001–1030	94 101–130	30	1921–1922	E h2t	
Tk	1–2		2	1876	B1 n2t	Taken over in 1899 with der Kirchheir Railway (Unterboihingen–Kirchheim unter Teck)
Tu	1–2		2	1873	B n2t	Taken over in 1904 with der Ermsthal Railway (Metzingen–Urach)
KL	1–2		2	1908	B h2t	Small locomotives with Kittel boiler, Taken over in 1910 from an order by the WeEG

=== Rack railway locomotives ===
Württemberg rack railway locomotives were built for the Honau–Lichtenstein rack railway and Freudenstadt–Klosterreichenbach routes.

Class	Railway number(s)	DRG number(s)	Quantity	Year(s) of manufacture	Type	Remarks
Fz	591–599	97 301–307	9	1893–1904	1′C n2(4v)t	Nos. 591–594 delivered as 691–694
(Hz)		97 501–504	4	1923–1925	E h2(4v)t	Delivered with DRG numbers

=== Rebuild locomotives ===
The Royal Württemberg State Railways rebuilt older locomotives in order to re-use them and they did so to a much greater extent than other German state railways. This conversion activity may be divided into two periods of time: in the first one, from 1867 to 1887, under senior engineers Brockmann and Gross, older 2'B locomotives were rebuilt into rigid-axled 1B engines and tank locomotives of various wheel arrangements. Under chief engineers Adolf Klose and Eugen Kittel, the last remaining 2'B locomotives were also rebuilt into tank locomotives during the second conversion period between 1887 and 1910, and older 1B and C types, some of which themselves had already been rebuilt once before, were converted to match the newer locomotive types in appearance and performance.

==== First conversion period 1867–1887 ====
Class	Railway number(s)	DRG number(s)	Quantity rebuilt	Year(s) rebuilt	Type	Remarks
B3	1"...148		51	1867–1883	1B n2	Rebuilt from 1 B (rebuild), 5 C (old), 45 D (old)
D (rebuild)	4"...48		16	1867–1874	1B n2	Rebuilt from 10 C (old), 6 D (old)
B2 (rebuild)	7...128		16	1868–1882	1B n2	Rebuilt from 9 A (old), 2 D (old), 5 E (old)
B (rebuild)	21...125		16	1869–1884	1B n2	Rebuilt from 3 A (old), 5 D (old), 1 D (rebuild), 7 E (old)
T2a	36, 37		2	1872–1875	1B n2t	Rebuilt from E (Alb)
E (rebuild)	88, 118		2	1873–1874	1′B n2	Rebuilt from E (old)
T4a	3"...123		11	1874–1886	2′B n2t	Rebuilt from 7 D (old), 1 D (rebuild), 1 E (old), 2 E (Alb)
T (rebuild)	87...129		7	1879–1887	B n2t	Rebuilt from E (old); 1 locomotive given the number and name of the retired Class D (old) engine, no. 105 Kirchberg
Aa (rebuild)	142, 179		2	1882	1B n2	Rebuilt from B (old)

==== Second conversion period 1887–1910 ====
Class	Railway number(s)	DRG number(s)	Quantity rebuilt	Year(s) rebuilt	Type	Remarks
T2aa	88, 118		2	1887–1892	1B n2t	Rebuilt from E (rebuild)
T2	4"...150		15	1890–1894	1B n2t	Rebuilt from 1 D (old), 14 D (rebuild)s
Fa (rebuild) ab 1906: F2	127"...267		8	1890–1892	C n2	Rebuilt from F (from 1892: Fa)
F2 (Rebuild)	8"...333	53 8301	88	1891–1910	C n2	Rebuilt from F (from 1892: Fa)
T4n	101...151		6	1891–1895	2′B n2t	Rebuilt from D (old)
Ab	7...313		16	1893–1902	1B n2	Rebuilt from 3 B, 1 B (rebuild), 2 B2, 10 B2 (rebuild)
Fb	12...148		12	1895–1899	1′C n2	Rebuilt from B3
A (rebuild)	318–327, 334–336	34 8101	13	1896–1905	1B n2	Rebuilt from Aa

=== Narrow gauge locomotives ===
==== 1000 mm gauge ====
The Württemberg metre gauge locomotives were built specifically for the Nagold-Altensteig route.

Class	Railway number(s)	DRG number(s)	Quantity	Year(s) of manufacture	Type	Remarks
Ts 4	1–3	99 171–173	3	1891–1899	D n2t	With Klose steering
Ts 3	10		1	1891	C n2t	Krauss type; former construction locomotive, no. 1900, taken over as an operational locomotive
Ts 3	9	99 121	1	1900	C n2t	Borsig type; taken over in 1904 from the fleet of the Württemberg Railway Company (WEG)
(Ts 5)		99 191–194	4	1927	E h2t	Procured by the DRG, delivered with DRG numbers

==== 750 mm gauge ====
The Württemberg 750 mm (2 ft 5 1/2 in) gauge locomotives were procured for following routes:

- Bottwartal line (Marbach–Beilstein–Heilbronn)
- Zabergäu line (Lauffen–Güglingen–Leonbronn)
- Federsee line (Schussenried–Buchau–Riedlingen)
- Öchsle narrow gauge line (Biberach–Warthausen–Ochsenhausen)

Class	Railway number(s)	DRG number(s)	Quantity	Year(s) of manufacture	Type	Remarks
Tss 4	11–13	99 621–622	3	1894	D n2t	With Klose steering, for Marbach–Beilstein
Tss 3	21–24	99 501–504	4	1896	C n2t	With Klose steering, for Lauffen–Güglingen and Schussenried–Buchau
Tssd	41–49	99 631–639	9	1899–1913	B′B n4vt	Articulated Mallet locomotive

== Railbuses ==
Class	Railway number(s)	DRG number(s)	Quantity	Year(s) of manufacture	Type	Remarks
BW	1–5		5	1887–1900	A1 bm	Petrol railbus
DW	1–5		5	1895–1901	A1 n2	Steam railbus with Serpollet boiler; no. 1 retired in 1908, nos. 2–5 equipped with Kittel boiler
DW	6–17	CidT 9–13	12	1903–1909	A1 h2	Steam railbus with Kittel boiler
AW	1		(1)	(1897)	Bo′2′ g2t	Accumulator car, rebuilt from a four-wheeled, Class E, passenger coach; reconverted in 1908
DWss	1		1	1907	(1A)2′ h2	Steam railbus with Kittel boiler for 750 mm (2 ft 5 1/2 in) gauge

== See also ==
- History of rail transport in Germany
- History of the railway in Württemberg
- Länderbahnen
- Kingdom of Württemberg
- Royal Württemberg State Railways
- UIC classification
