= Railway Vehicle Preservation Company =

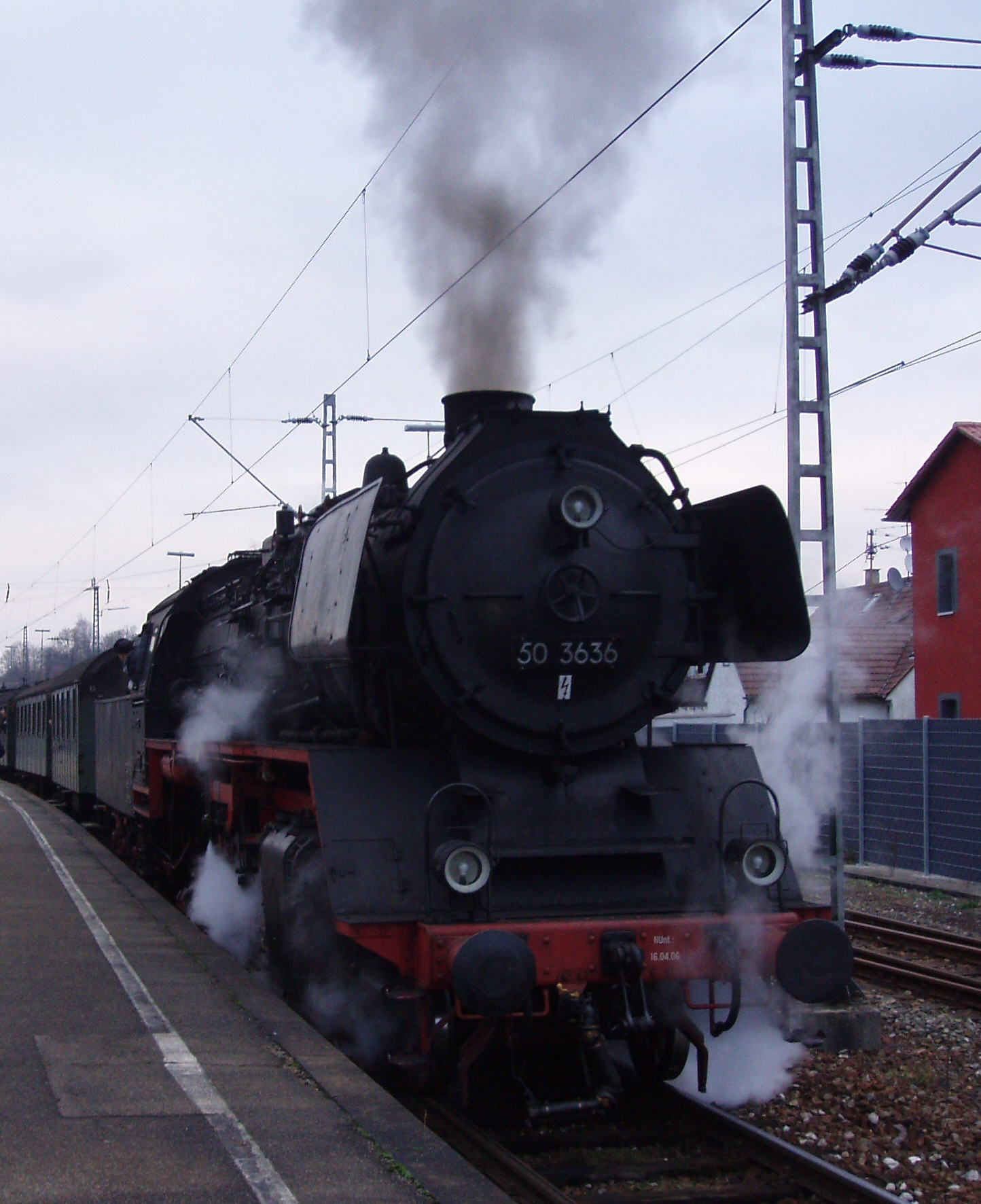
Locomotive 50 3636 in operation in front of the Sofazügle train

The Railway Vehicle Preservation Society (Gesellschaft zur Erhaltung von Schienenfahrzeugen e.V. or GES) is one of the oldest societies in Germany that runs a museum railway. The headquarters of the GES is in Stuttgart.

== Formation ==
The society was founded on 8 December 1965 by a group of tramway fans within the so-called Verkehrsfreunde Stuttgart society, that had signed up for the preservation and care of the last remaining railcar, no. 126, from the former Filderbahn as well as other historically valuable trams. After the Stuttgart Tram Company (Stuttgarter Straßenbahnen or SSB) had shown no interest in building up a museum collection and the Filderbahn railcar 126 could only be preserved by keeping it at Ludwigsburg, the GES turned at the end of the 1960s to the more promising theme of opening a railway. The engagement of the GES for the preservation and subsequent restoration of the Filderbahn wagon laid the foundation stone for the present-day collection of the Stuttgarter Historische Straßenbahnen.

== Timetable ==
The GES runs regular museum railway operations using the historical train consists Feuriger Elias ('Fiery Elias') and Sofazügle (literally: 'Little Sofa Train'). Due to the ban on steam locomotives issued by the Deutsche Bundesbahn between 1977 and 1985 the operations were restricted to private railway lines on the Strohgäubahn from Korntal-Münchingen to Weissach or the Tälesbahn between Nürtingen and Neuffen. The trains continue to have this as their there today. To begin with, special trips were also run on the WEG routes from Enz Nord to Enzweihingen and, up to 1982, on the Filderbahn between Stuttgart-Möhringen, Stuttgart-Vaihingen, Leinfelden and Neuhausen auf den Fildern. From 1985, specials were also offered on other routes in the Stuttgart area.

== Hohenzollern train ==
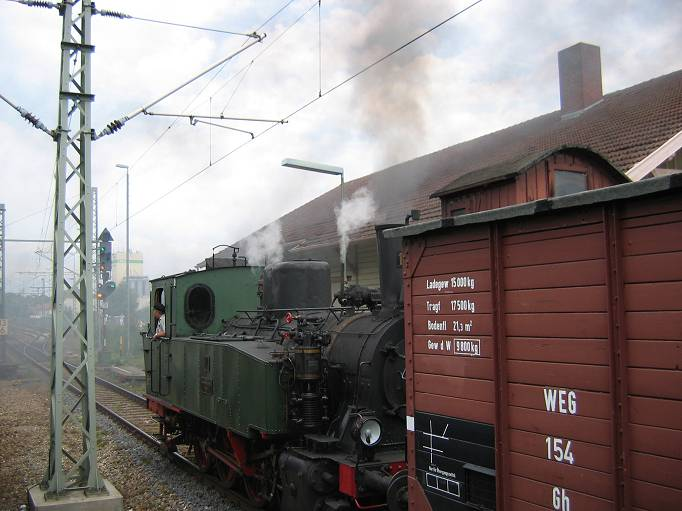
Locomotive 11 of the GES in Marbach (June 2004)

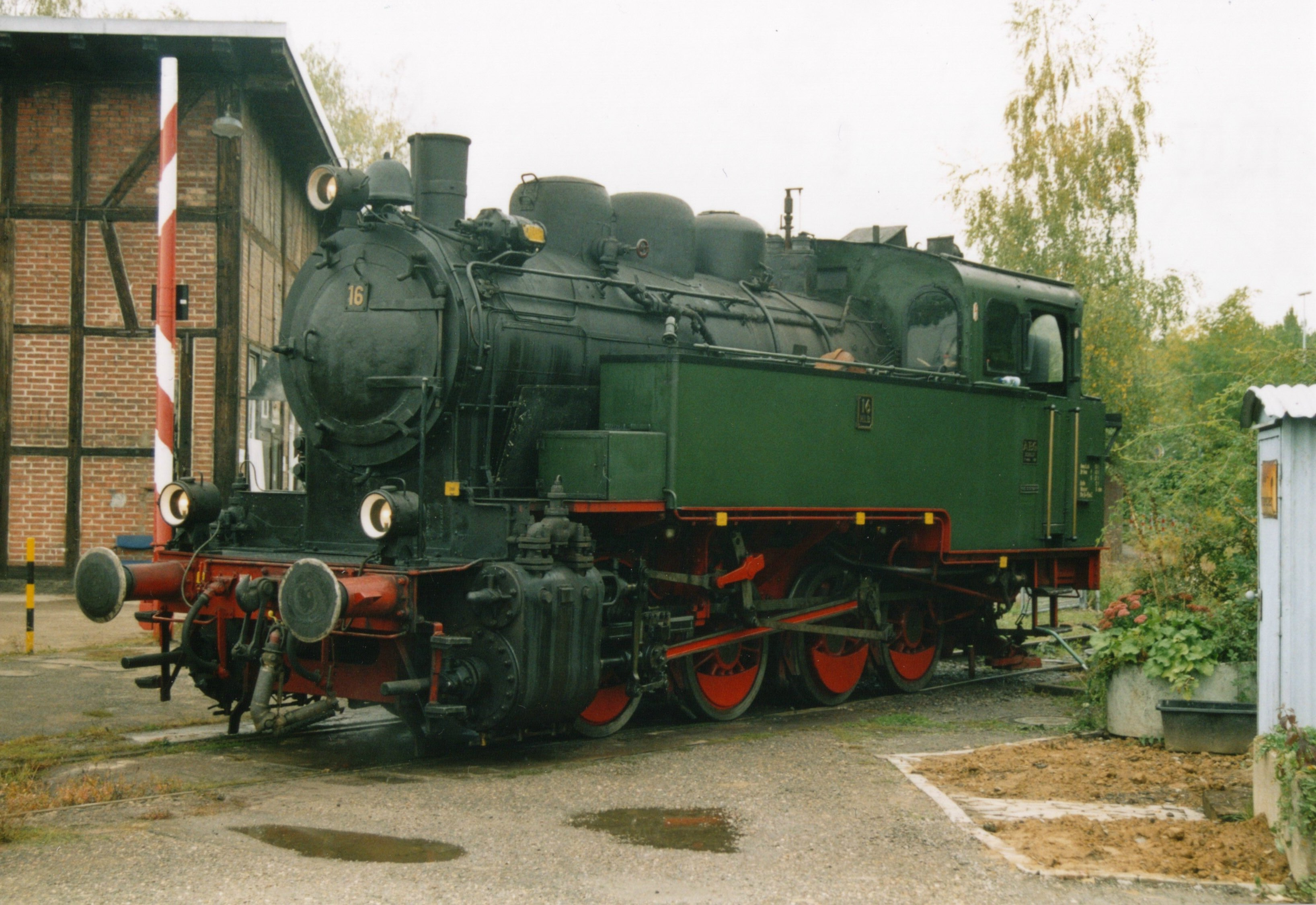
Locomotive GES no. 16, formerly KOE no. 11

The GES has a cultural monument to the state of Baden-Württemberg: the Hohenzollern train. It comprises vehicles that were operated by the Hohenzollern Branch Line Company (Hohenzollerischen Kleinbahn Gesellschaft, from 1907 the Hohenzollerische Landesbahn). The majority of these are deployed in museum railway services on the Tälesbahn as part of the Sofazügle.

=== List of vehicles ===
Vehicle:	Manufacturer:	Built:	Status:
Steam locomotive 11	Maschinenfabrik Esslingen	1911	Operational
Steam locomotive 16 (formerly KOE no. 11, DRG 92 442)	AEG	1928	Operational
Passenger coach 3	Beuchelt & Co.	1900	Operational
Passenger coach 6	Beuchelt & Co.	1900	Operational
Passenger coach 7	Beuchelt & Co.	1900	Stored
Passenger coach 9	Beuchelt & Co.	1900	Being restored
Passenger coach 21	Waggonfabrik Rastatt	1908	Operational
Passenger coach 22	Waggonfabrik Rastatt	1908	Operational
Passenger coach 24	Waggonfabrik Rastatt	1908	Stored
Passenger coach 26	Waggonfabrik Rastatt	1908	Stored
Luggage van 73	Beuchelt & Co.	1900	Operational
Luggage van 74	Beuchelt & Co.	1900	Being restored
Luggage van 77	Beuchelt & Co.	1900	Operational

== Tourist train vehicles ==
Number	Type/Builder	Built/class	Status
50 3636	MBA, later O&K	1941	Operational
39 079 Stg	Spantenwagen/ÖBB	2nd class	Operational
34 531 Stg	Spantenwagen/ÖBB	2nd class	Operational
39 692 Stg	Spantenwagen/ÖBB	Dining car	Operational
39 439 Stg	Spantenwagen/ÖBB	1st class	Operational
39 433 Stg	Spantenwagen/ÖBB	2nd class	Operational
39 425 Stg	Spantenwagen/ÖBB	2nd class	Operational
114 535 Stg	Spantenwagen/ÖBB	Luggage van	Operational
235 610	Oppeln	G-Wagen	Operational
V100 1357	Maschinenfabrik Esslingen	1962	Operational (with EMN Kornwestheim)

The GES is working on restoring a Württemberg T 3 (K.W.St.E no. 930 and DRG no. 89 363).

Coaches of the GES

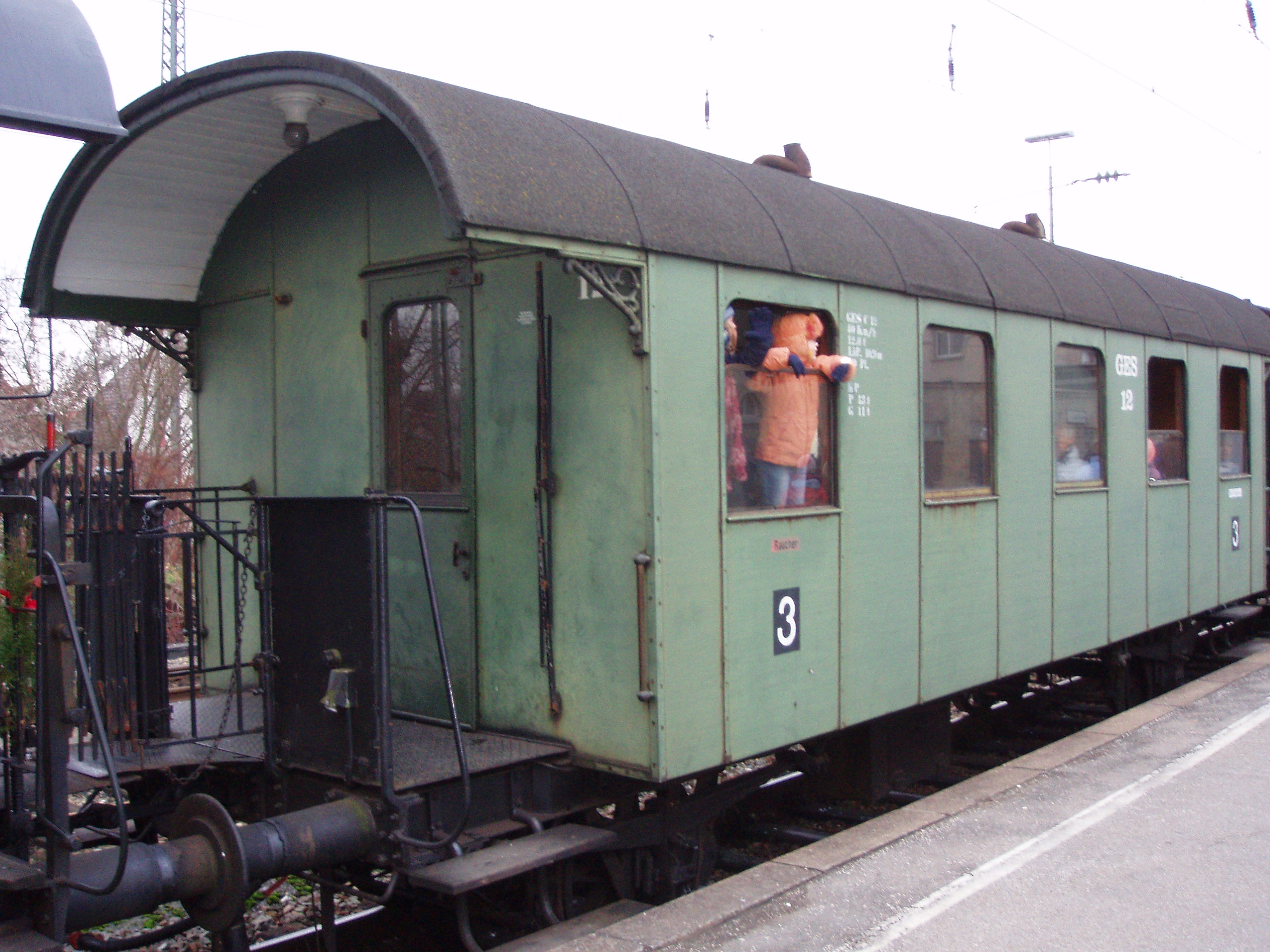
GES 12

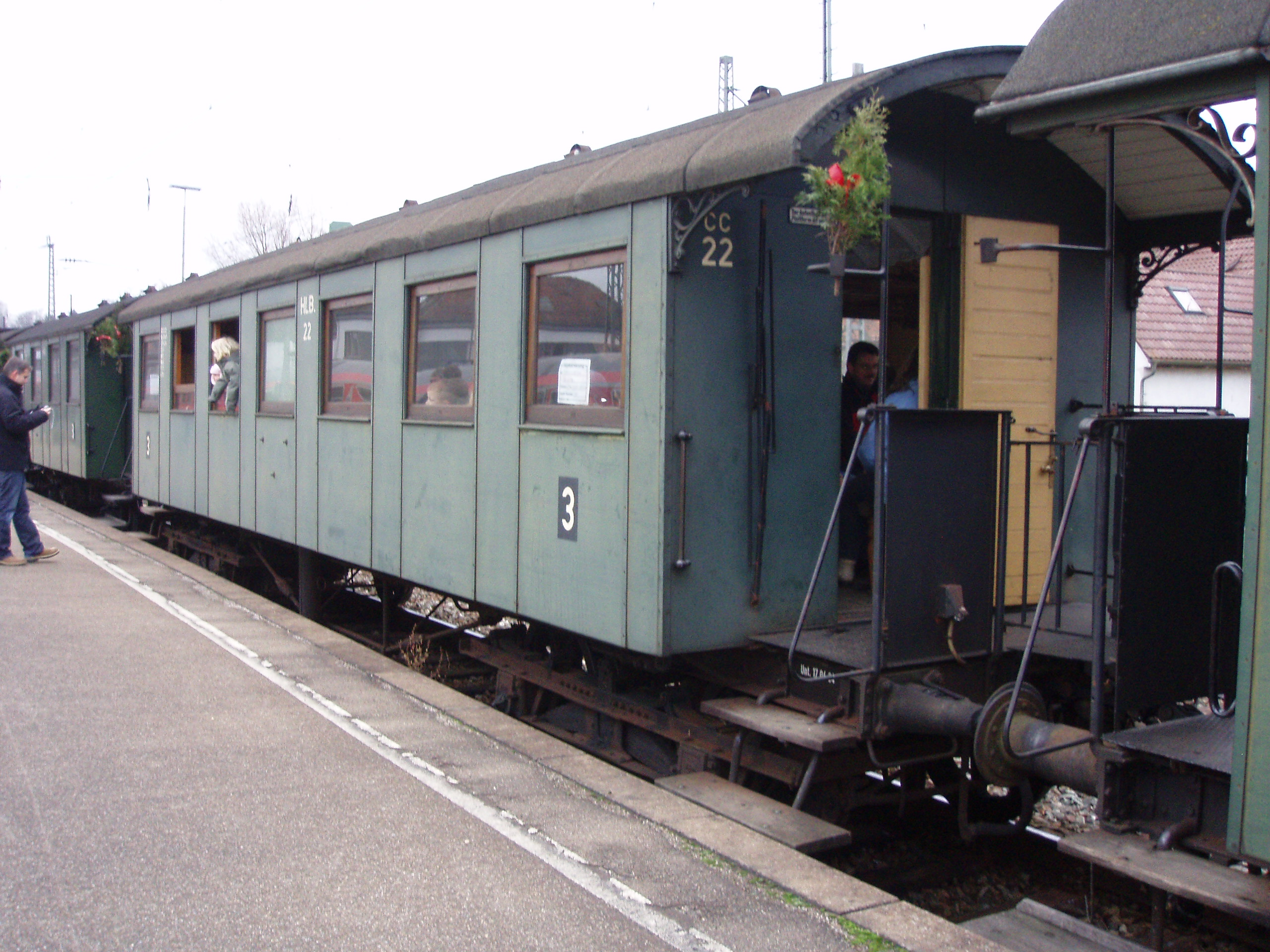
Passenger coach 22 of the Hohenzollern train

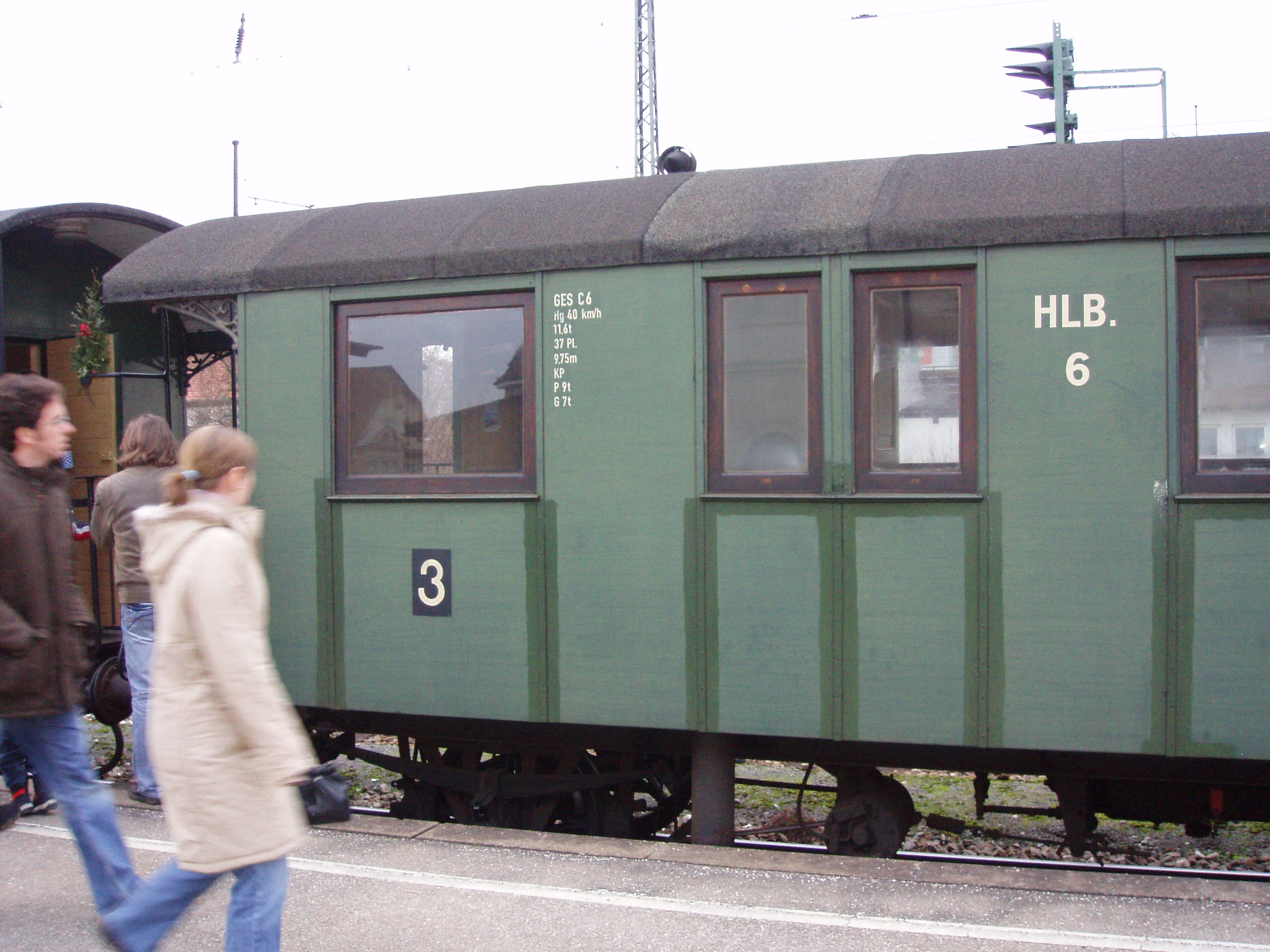
Passenger coach 6 of the Hohenzollern train
