= Württemberg T 3 =

Württemberg T 3 DRG Class 89.3-4
Locomotive 89 339 in Bochum Dahlhausen (5 October 1985)
Quantity	14	96
Numbers	DRG 89 301-311; DRG 89 314–316	DRG 89 312–313; DRG 89 317–410
Manufacturers	Maschinenfabrik Esslingen; MG Heilbronn, Krauss	
Entered service	1891–1896	1896–1913
Retired		
Wheel arrangement	0-6-0	
Axle arrangement	C n2	
Type	Gt 33.10	Gt 33.12
Average axle load	10,0 t	12.0 t
Length over buffers	8,505 mm (27 ft 10 3/4 in)	
Driving wheel diameter	1,045 mm (3 ft 5 1/4 in)	
Top speed	45 km/h (28 mph)	
Boiler overpressure	12 kg/cm^{2} (1,180 kPa; 171 psi)	
Cylinder bore	380 mm (14 15/16 in)	
Piston stroke	540 mm (21 1/4 in)	
Grate area	1.00 m^{2} (10.8 sq ft)	
Evaporative heating area	63.90 m^{2} (687.8 sq ft)	
Power	N.K.	
Adhesive weight	29,7 t	35.7 t
Service weight	29,7 t	35.7 t
Brakes	N.K:	

The Württemberg T 3s were German steam locomotives with the Royal Württemberg State Railways (Königlich Württembergische Staats-Eisenbahnen) delivered between 1891 and 1913.

These tank locomotives were built for hauling goods trains and had three coupled axles but no carrying axles. All 110 examples went into the Deutsche Reichsbahn fleet where they were incorporated as DRG Class 89.3-4 in the numbering plan. By 1945 almost all of them had been retired or transferred to industry.

Three locomotives were rescued from the scrap yard, one of which is being presently restored to operational condition by the Railway Vehicle Preservation Society (Gesellschaft zur Erhaltung von Schienenfahrzeugen).

Württemberg T 3 L DRG Class 89.4
Quantity	4
Number range	DRG 89 411
Manufacturers	Esslingen; Heilbronn; Krauss
Entered service	1894–1898
Retired	
Wheel arrangement	0-6-0
Axle arrangement	C
Average axle load	10.8 tonnes (10.6 long tons; 11.9 short tons)
Length over buffers	8,920 mm (29 ft 3 1/8 in)
Ø Driving wheel	1,045 mm (3 ft 5 1/4 in)
Top speed	45 km/h (28 mph)
Boiler overpressure	12 kg/cm^{2} (1,180 kPa; 171 psi)
Cylinder bore	380 mm (14 15/16 in)
Piston stroke	540 mm (21 1/4 in)
Grate area	1.00 m^{2} (10.8 sq ft)
Evaporative heating area	63.90 m^{2} (687.8 sq ft)
Power	N.K.
Adhesive weight	32.3 tonnes (31.8 long tons; 35.6 short tons)
Service weight	32.3 tonnes (31.8 long tons; 35.6 short tons)
Brakes	N.K.

The Class T 3 L engines of the Royal Württemberg State Railways were also 0-6-0 tank locomotives and intended for goods train duties. Four examples were built, of which one survived into the Deutsche Reichsbahn fleet and was numbered as 89 411 within Class 89.3-4 of the DRG renumbering plan.

These four 'specials' had a steerable axle and were somewhat longer than the other Württemberg T 3s. They were deployed on the lines from Schiltach to Schramberg and from Waldenburg to Künzelsau, but proved to have very high maintenance costs, with the result that three of them were retired by the Württemberg State Railways. The remaining one was taken over by the Reichsbahn, but was soon taken out of service as well.

== See also ==
- Royal Württemberg State Railways
- List of Württemberg locomotives and railbuses
