= Württemberg D =

Württemberg D DRG 38.1 • PKP Ok102
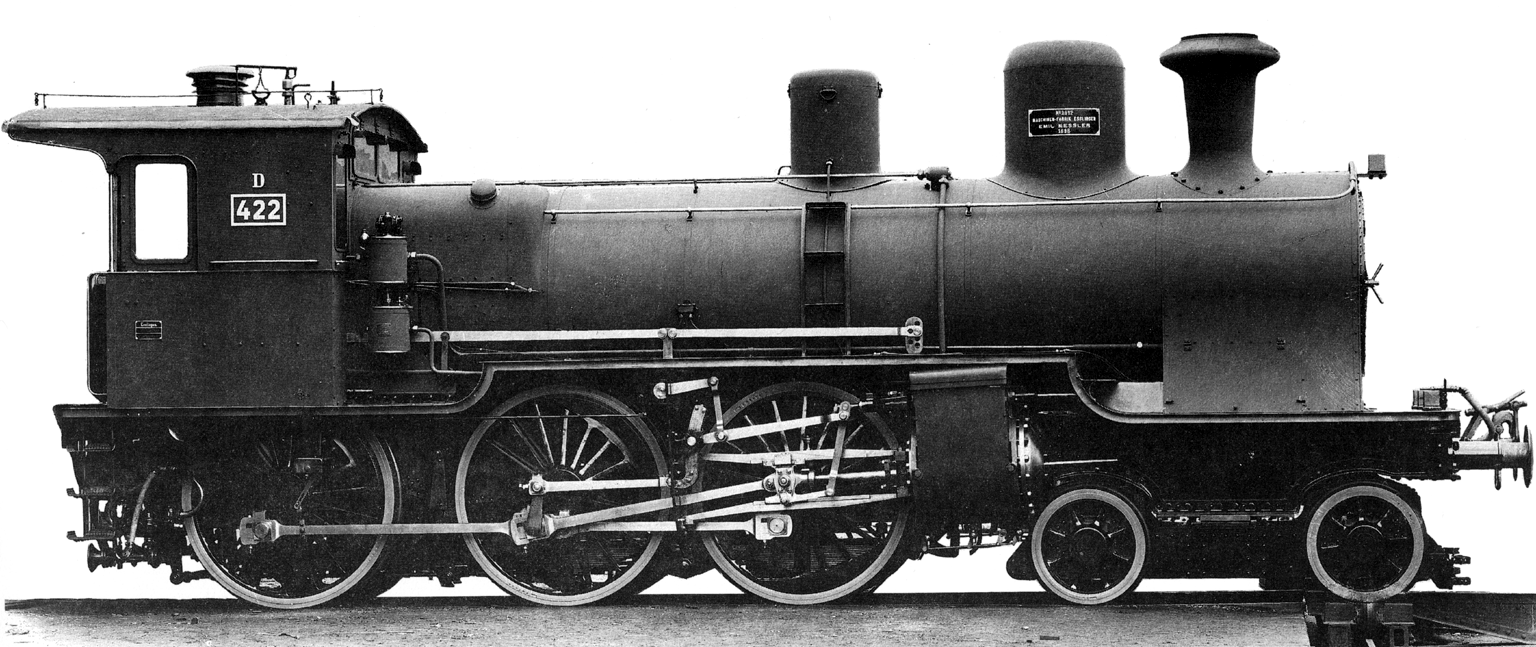
- No. 422 in a works photograph
Type and origin
- Power type: Steam
- Builder: Maschinenfabrik Esslingen
- Build date: 1898–1905
- Total produced: 14
Specifications
- Configuration
  - Whyte: 4-6-0
  - UIC: 2′C n4v
- Gauge: 1,435 mm (4 ft 8 1/2 in)
- Leading dia.: 850 mm (2 ft 9 1/2 in)
- Driver dia.: 1,650 mm (5 ft 4.96062992 in)
- Length: 16.92 m (55 ft 6 1/4 in) over buffers
- Axle load: 15.0 tonnes (14.8 long tons; 16.5 short tons)
- Adhesive weight: 44.8 tonnes (44.1 long tons; 49.4 short tons)
- Loco weight: 64.4 tonnes (63.4 long tons; 71.0 short tons)
- Fuel type: 2′2′ T
- Firebox
  - Grate area: 2.3 m^{2} (25 sq ft)
- Boiler pressure: 14 kgf/cm^{2} (1.37 MPa; 199 lbf/in^{2})
- Heating surface: 162.0 m^{2} (1,744 sq ft)
- Cylinders: Four: de Glehn compound
- High-pressure cylinder: 380 mm × 560 mm (14 15/16 in × 22 1/16 in)
- Low-pressure cylinder: 600 mm × 560 mm (23 5/8 in × 22 1/16 in)
Performance figures
- Maximum speed: 90 km/h (56 mph)
Career
- Numbers: K.W.St.E.: 421–424; DR: 38 101 to 38 108; PKP: Ok102-1 to Ok102-4; État: 230-985 and 230-986
- Withdrawn: DRG: 1924; PKP: État: 1930–34

The Württemberg D was a class of 14 locomotives of the Royal Württemberg State Railways (Königlich Württembergische Staats-Eisenbahnenen, K.W.St.E.)

They were designed for the Ulm to Bretten via Stuttgart line. They were a four-cylinder de Glehn compound. They were capable of taking a train of 250 tonnes (250 long tons; 280 short tons) up a 1% (1 in 100) incline at a speed of 60 km/h (37 mph).

After the First World War, only eight locomotives went to the Deutsche Reichsbahn, who allocated them the numbers 38 101 to 38 108; however, they were not in active service, and were scrapped in 1924.

Four went to Poland, where the PKP classed them as Ok102. Two (426 and 429) went to France as reparations, and were allocated to the Chemins de fer de l'État, who renumbered them 230-985 and 230-986; they were little used, 230-986 was withdrawn circa 1930, and 230-985 was scrapped in 1934.

They were equipped with type 2′2′ T tenders.
