= Class 59 =

Class 59 or 59 class may refer to:

- British Rail Class 59
- DRG Class 59, German steam locomotive
  - Württemberg K, later became the DRG Class 59
- EAR 59 class
- New South Wales 59 class locomotive
