= Württemberg I =

Type and origin
- Power type: Steam
- Builder: Norris Locomotive Works
- Build date: 1845
- Total produced: 3
Specifications
- Configuration
  - UIC: 2′B n2
- Gauge: 1,435 mm (4 ft 8 1/2 in)
- Leading dia.: c. 800 mm (31 1/2 in)
- Driver dia.: 1,530 mm (60 1/4 in)
- Length: c. 10.63 m (34 ft 10 1/2 in)
- Adhesive weight: 10 tonnes (9.8 long tons; 11 short tons)
- Loco weight: 16 tonnes (16 long tons; 18 short tons)
- Firebox
  - Grate area: 0.87 m^{2} (9.4 sq ft)
- Boiler pressure: 6.3 kgf/cm^{2} (620 kPa; 90 psi)
- Heating surface: c. 60 m^{2} (650 sq ft)
- Cylinders: Two, outside
- Cylinder size: 318 mm × 635 mm (12 1/2 in × 25 in)
Career
- Operators: Royal Württemberg State Railways
- Numbers: 1 – 3
- Withdrawn: 1870s

The Würtemberg I was a class of tender locomotives of the Royal Württemberg State Railways (Königlich Württembergischen Staats-Eisenbahnen, K.W.St.E). They were their first locomotives.

== Development ==
The three locomotives were of the 4-4-0 wheel arrangement and were manufactured by the Norris Locomotive Works in Philadelphia. They had a round-topped firebox, which sat between the two pairs of driving wheels. The two outside cylinders were mounted at front of the boiler, at the height of the front axle.

The open cab was level with the outer edge of the frame and was therefore rather narrow. The wheel arch for the rear driving wheels also protruded into the cab. The locomotives were rebuilt during their service lives and were withdrawn in 1861.

== Fleet list ==
| Year | K.W.St.E. fleet number | Name | Withdrawn |
|---|---|---|---|
| 1845 | 1 | Donau | 1861 |
| 1845 | 2 | Fils | 1861 |
| 1845 | 3 | Jagst | 1861 |
