= Max Mayer (engineer) =

German civil engineer (1886–1967)

Max Mayer (16 September 1886 in Salzburg – 29 July 1967 in Starnberg) was a German civil engineer.

== Biography ==
Mayer received his doctorate in 1913 from the Technical University of Munich (Economy as a Design principle in Reinforced Concrete Construction). From 1914 (during the WWI and the subsequent Weimar Republic) Mayer spoke and published on reforming construction in line with the scientific management ideas set out by the American mechanical engineer Frederick Winslow Taylor. From 1926 to 1930 he was a professor at the state building college in Weimar and then a consulting engineer in Munich.

With his book Die Sicherheit der Bauwerke (The Safety of Structures) from 1926, he was a pioneer of limit state design and hence the appropriate use of factors of safety. He also published a book on nomography for civil engineers, books for introduction in structural analysis and construction management.

== Bibliography ==
- Die Anregungen Taylors für den Baubetrieb (Taylor's Suggestions for Construction), Springer 1915
- Die Sicherheit der Bauwerke und ihre Berechnung nach Grenzkräften anstatt nach zulässigen Spannungen (The safety of structures and their calculation based on limit forces instead of allowable stresses), Springer, Berlin 1926 (66 pages)
- Betriebswissenschaft : Ein Überblick über das lebendige Schaffen des Bauingenieurs (Business science: An overview of the living work of civil engineers), Springer Verlag, reference library for civil engineers 5, Berlin 1926
- Lokomotiven, Wagen und Bergbahnen – Geschichtliche Entwicklung in der Maschinenfabrik Eßlingen seit dem Jahre 1846 (Locomotives, wagons and mountain railways - historical development in the Esslingen Machineworks since 1846) VDI-Verlag, Berlin 1924.
- Nomographie des Bauingenieurs (Nomography of Civil Engineers), Göschen Collection 1927
- Neue Statik der Tragwerke aus biegesteifen Stäben (New statics of supporting structures made of rigid rods), Bauwelt-Verlag, Berlin 1937, 2nd edition 1942
- Betriebswissenschaft des Ingenieurbaus (Management Science of Civil Engineering), De Gruyter, Berlin 1936
- Die Abmessungen der tragenden Bauteile : Richtwerte für den Baumeister, besonders für den entwerfenden Architekten zur schätzungsweisen Bemessung der Bauteile (The dimensions of the load-bearing components: guidelines for the master builder, especially for the designing architect for the estimated dimensioning of the components), Bauwelt-Verlag, Berlin 1944
- Lebendige Baustatik, Band 1: Die statische Berechnung, Bauwelt-Verlag (Living structural engineering), Volume 1: The static calculation, Bauwelt-Verlag, Berlin 1953
- Statische Berechnung (Static calculation), 2 volumes, 1953, 4th edition, Ullstein 1965, 1966 (with Ernst Zellerer, also translated into Spanish)
