= Württemberg K =

Class of German steam locomotives

Württemberg K class DRG Class 59 ÖBB 659
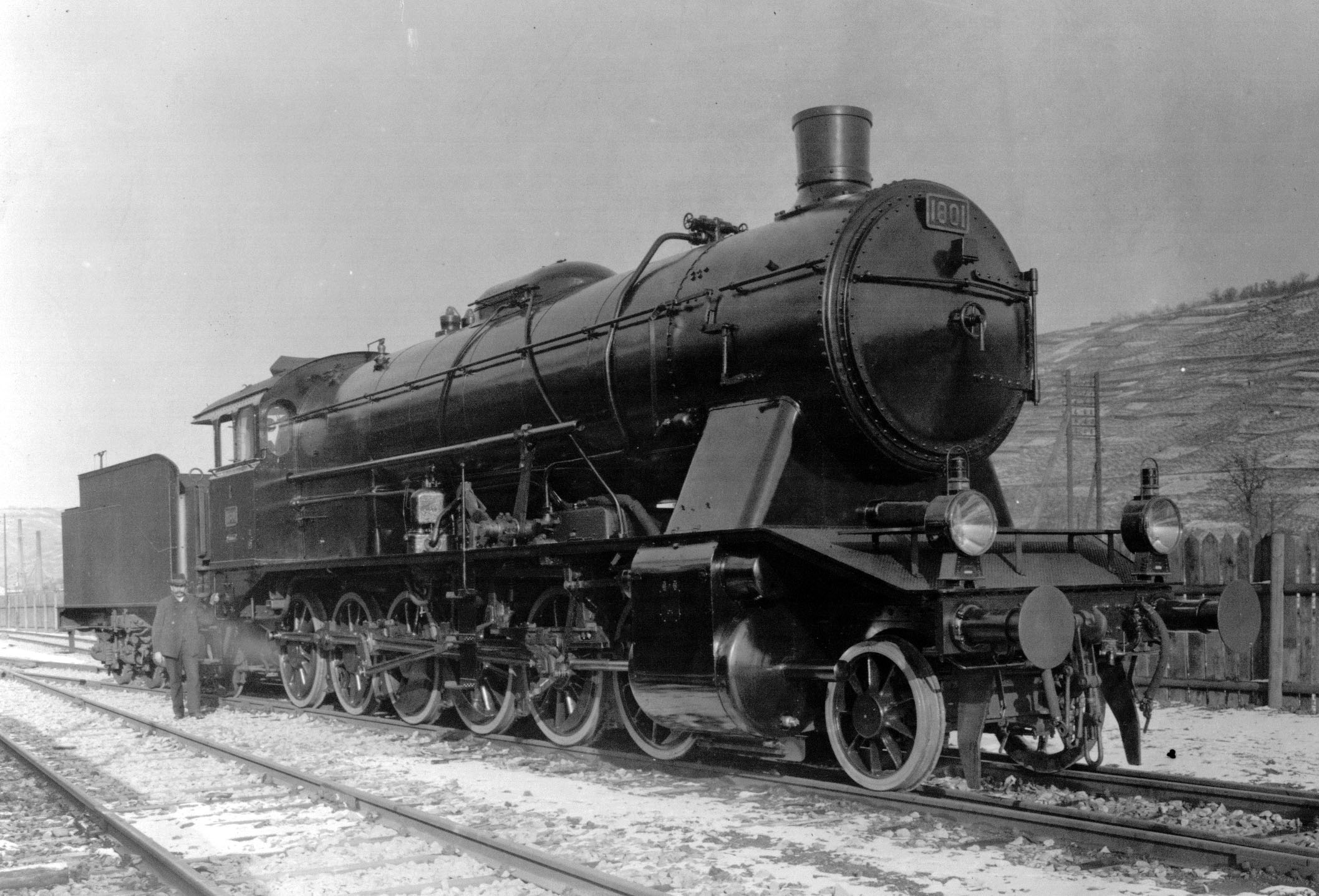
Type and origin
- Builder: Maschinenfabrik Esslingen
- Build date: 1917–1919; 1923–1924
- Total produced: 44
Specifications
- Gauge: 1,435 mm (4 ft 8 1/2 in)
- Leading dia.: 943 mm (3 ft 1 1/8 in)
- Driver dia.: 1,350 mm (4 ft 5 1/8 in)
- Length
  - Over beams: 20,190 mm (66 ft 2 7/8 in)
- Axle load: 16.0 tonnes (15.7 long tons; 17.6 short tons)
- Adhesive weight: 94.6 tonnes (93.1 long tons; 104.3 short tons)
- Service weight: 108.0 tonnes (106.3 long tons; 119.0 short tons)
- Water cap.: 20.0 m^{3} (4,400 imp gal; 5,300 US gal) or 21.5 m^{3} (4,700 imp gal; 5,700 US gal) or 31.5 m^{3} (6,900 imp gal; 8,300 US gal)
- Boiler pressure: 15 kg/cm^{2} (1.47 MPa; 213 psi)
- Heating surface
  - Firebox: 4.20 m^{2} (45.2 sq ft)
  - Evaporative: 232.00 m^{2} (2,497.2 sq ft)
- Superheater
  - Heating area: 80.00 m^{2} (861.1 sq ft)
- High-pressure cylinder: 500 mm (19 11/16 in)
- Low-pressure cylinder: 750 mm (29 1/2 in)
- Piston stroke: 650 mm (25 9/16 in)
- Loco brake: Compressed-air brake
Performance figures
- Maximum speed: 65 km/h (40 mph)
- Indicated power: 1,920 PS (1,410 kW; 1,890 hp)
Career
- Numbers: K.W.St.E.: 1801–1834; DRG 59 001 – 59 044
- Retired: 1953

The Württemberg Class K steam locomotives of the Royal Württemberg State Railways (Königlich Württembergische Staats-Eisenbahnen) were the only twelve-coupled locomotives built for a German railway company.

== History ==
The 44 engines of this class built by the Maschinenfabrik Esslingen between 1917 and 1924 were intended for work on the Geislingen ramp (Geislinger Steige) and the Baden Black Forest line. As a result of good experiences in Austria and the fact that there was a maximum axle load of only 16 tonnes on those routes, it was decided to produce a twelve-coupled locomotive. The first and last coupled axles were given side-play (Gölsdorf system), the wheel flanges of the two centre axles were reduced by about 15 mm.

The locomotives proved to be a successful design that was very reliable and powerful. In operations on the hilly routes it was very thrifty, however it was not so economical on the flat. The Deutsche Reichsbahn, that had taken over all the locomotives as DRG Class 59, raised the permissible axle load on the important main lines, so that the performance of the Class K could finally be augmented by ten-coupled engines. As a result, no further batches were ordered.

== Move to Austria ==
After the routes of the Geislinger Steige had been electrified, the engines were no longer required and were given away to Austria, where they were used on the Semmering railway. From there several units went to Yugoslavia and Hungary during the course of the Second World War. The vehicles that remained with, or were returned to, the Deutsche Bundesbahn continued in service until 1953.

Of the 30 examples that stayed in Austria after the Second World War, the majority were sold, two units went to the Soviet Union, six to the Hungarian Railways (MAV). The remaining four engines retained their serial numbers but were grouped into ÖBB Class 659, namely the 659.06, 23, 29 and 41. All locomotives of this class were retired by 1957.

== Tenders ==
The vehicles were coupled with Württemberg and Prussian tenders of classes wü 2′2′ T 20, pr 2′2′ T 21.5 and pr 2′2′ T 31.5.

== See also ==
- List of Württemberg locomotives and railbuses
