= Royal Württemberg State Railways =

State railways of the Kingdom of Württemberg (1843–1920)

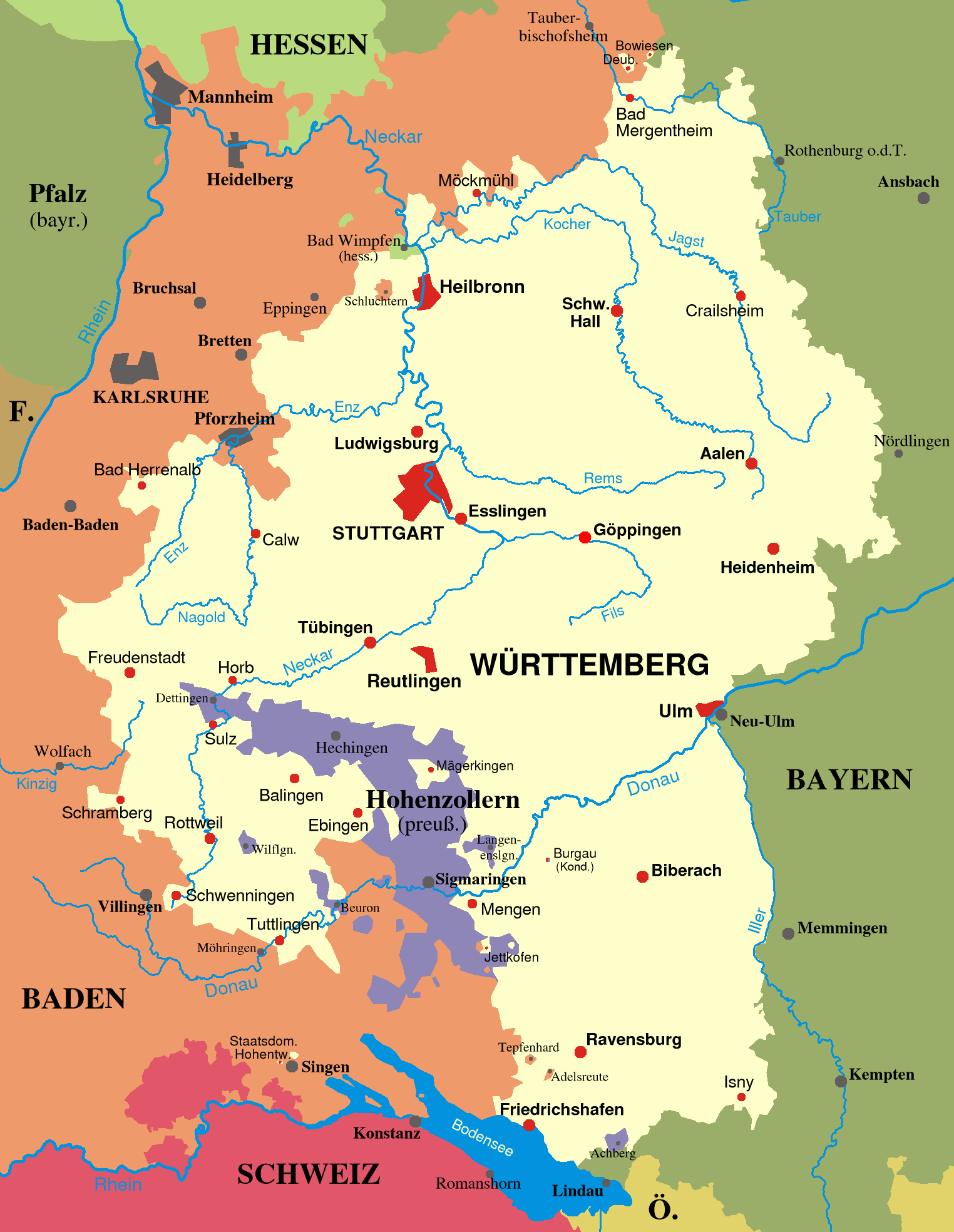
Kingdom of Württemberg as it existed from the end of the Napoleonic Wars to the end of World War I.

The Royal Württemberg State Railways (Königlich Württembergische Staats-Eisenbahnen or K.W.St.E.) were the state railways of the Kingdom of Württemberg (from 1918 the People's State of Württemberg) between 1843 and 1920.

== Early history ==
The national flag of the Kingdom of Württemberg

As in many other states of the German Empire, there was increasing debate about how to improve transport communications across the country from about 1825. Private interest groups were formed and, from 1834, the state also worked on the question, giving experts the task of finding suitable solutions. After years of preparatory work, it was decided to set up a railway network, the main lines of which would be built by the state.

The Railway Bill of 18 April 1843, established the legal foundation for the construction of the railway network; this date is seen as the birthday for the K.W.St.E.. The law expressly envisaged that the construction of branch routes by private companies should also be possible. This law was at the same time the impetus for the foundation of the Maschinenfabrik Esslingen ('Esslingen Engineering Works'), that played a decisive role in railway construction and railway technology in Württemberg.

== Overview of the development of the state railway routes ==
=== Main lines ===
In the Kingdom of Württemberg the state railway started with the so-called Württemberg main lines. They ran from Stuttgart, along the River Neckar, on one side via Ulm to Friedrichshafen on Lake Constance, on the other side via Bretten to Bruchsal in the Grand Duchy of Baden. From Bietigheim the Lower Neckar Railway (North Railway or Nordbahn) branched off toward Heilbronn.

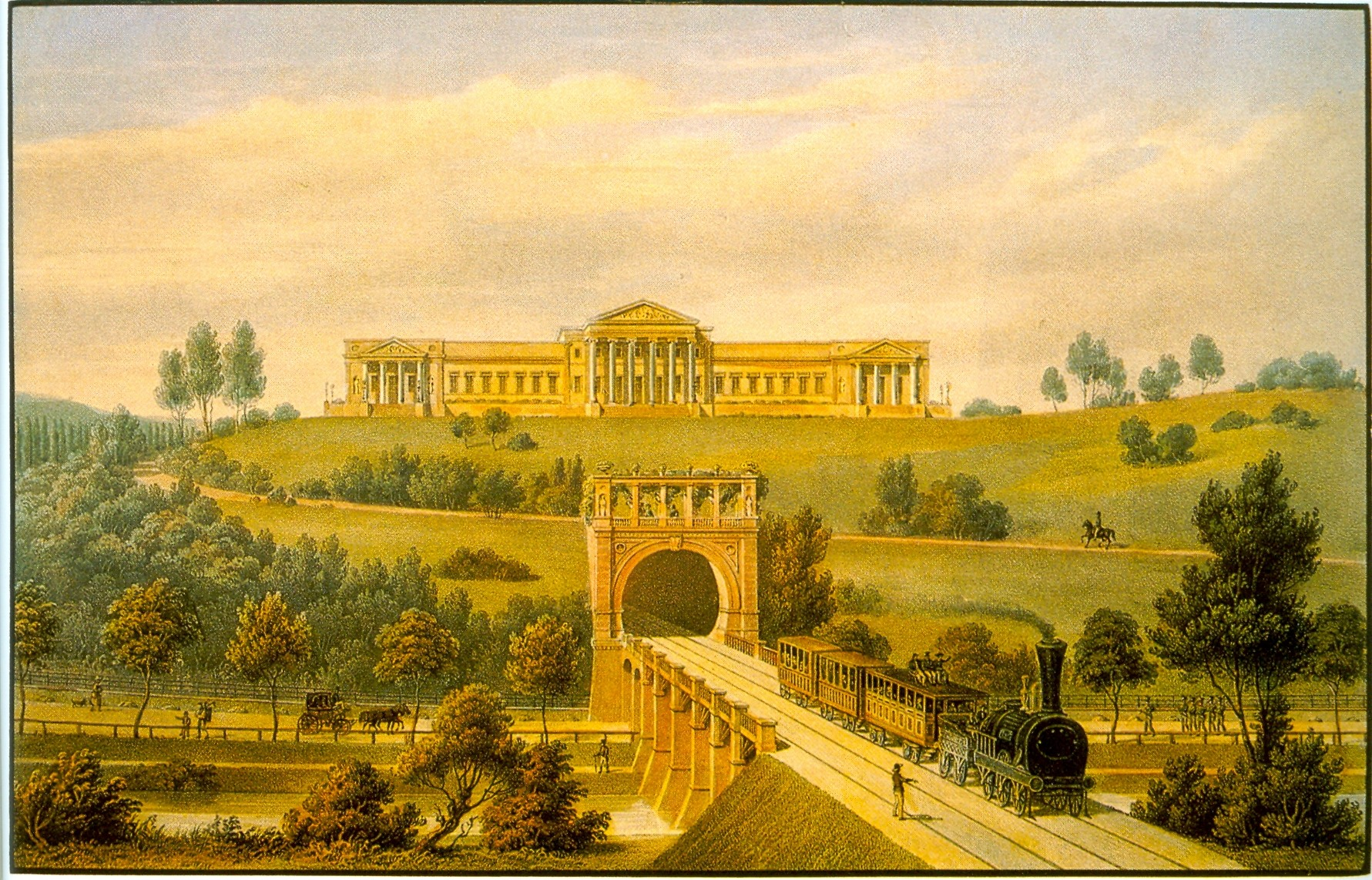
Rosenstein tunnel in Cannstatt. Lithograph by Eberhard Emminger

Dates opened
Date	Start	End
22 October 1845	Cannstatt	Untertürkheim
7 November 1845	Untertürkheim	Obertürkheim
20 November 1845	Obertürkheim	Esslingen
15 October 1846	Cannstatt	Ludwigsburg
14 December 1846	Esslingen	Plochingen
11 October 1847	Plochingen	Süßen
11 October 1847	Ludwigsburg	Bietigheim
8 November 1847	Ravensburg	Friedrichshafen
25 July 1848	Bietigheim	Heilbronn
26 May 1849	Biberach	Ravensburg
14 June 1849	Süßen	Geislingen
1 June 1850	Biberach	Ulm
29 June 1850	Geislingen	Ulm
1 October 1853	Bietigheim	Bretten
1 June 1854	Ulm	Neu-Ulm

=== Expansion of the main lines ===
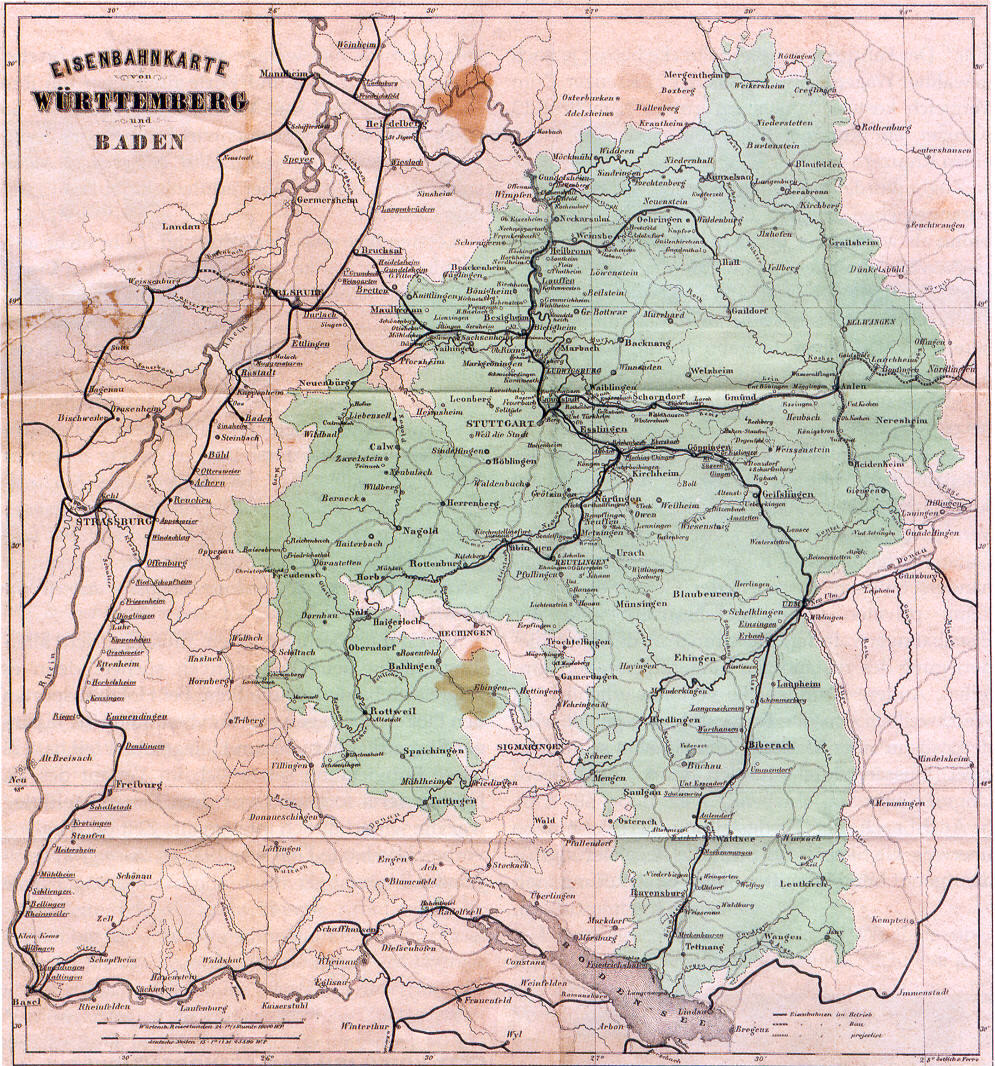
Railway map of Württemberg as at 1863

After a pause of several years, work began on the Upper Neckar Railway that ran from Plochingen and reached Reutlingen in 1859, the bishop's town of Rottenburg am Neckar via Tübingen in 1861 and Eyach and the junction of Horb am Neckar in 1864/66.

In eastern Württemberg the Rems line was built in 1861, running from Cannstatt via Schorndorf–Aalen to Wasseralfingen and in 1863 the junction at Nördlingen to the Bavarian railway network was achieved.

In 1862, the Kocher Valley line was established. This ran through Heilbronn from Hohenloh Land and on to Schwäbisch Hall. In 1867 it reached Crailsheim where trains on the Upper Jagst line from Aalen called and, in 1869, the connection was made with the Tauber Valley Railway to Mergentheim.

The Brenz line, which was opened in 1864 to Heidenheim an der Brenz, had the potential to provide a link through the Ostalb from Aalen to Ulm, but did not achieve this aim until 1875/76. The spa town of Wildbad in the Black Forest was linked in 1868 to the Enz Valley Railway at the junction of Pforzheim in Baden.

From Heilbronn the Lower Neckar line was extended in 1866 to Jagstfeld and from there 3 years later the line was extended as the Lower Jagst Valley Railway to Osterburken; in both stations further links to the Baden state railways were made.

From Horb, the Upper Neckar line reached Rottweil in 1867/68, and from there in 1869, the Baden town of Villingen in the Black Forest. In the same year the first trains ran on the Upper Danube line from Rottweil to Tuttlingen, from where in 1870 the connexion to Immendingen on the Black Forest line was built.

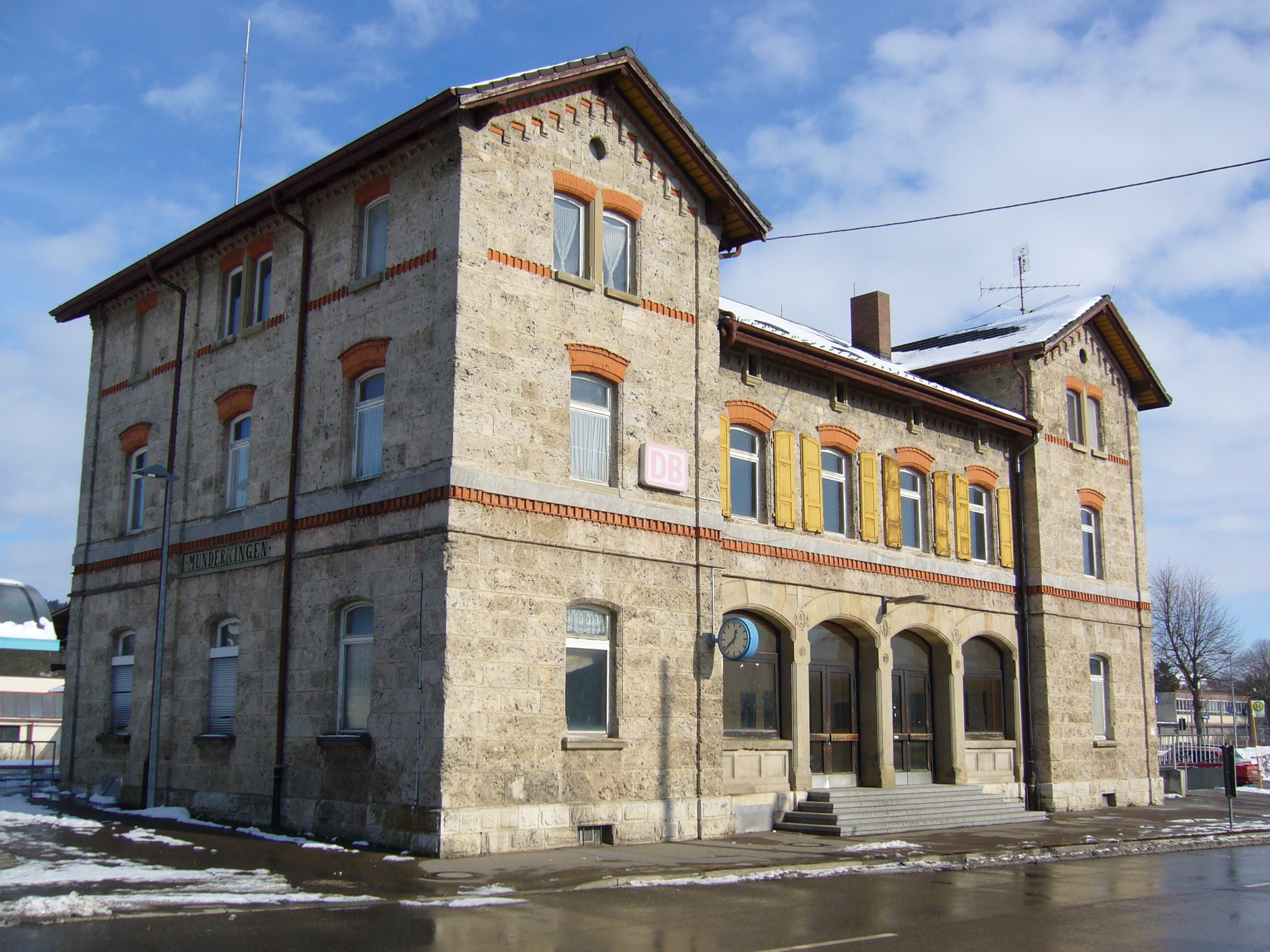
K.W.St.E. station building K.W.St.E. in Munderkingen on the Danube Valley line

The Danube Valley line was built in 1868 from Ulm in the direction of Blaubeuren-Riedlingen, but only reached Sigmaringen in 1873. It was another six years before the Zollernalb line finished the connexion from Tübingen, that had linked Hechingen in 1869 and Balingen in 1874.

The Black Forest line branched off in 1868/69 in Zuffenhausen to Weil der Stadt and got as far as the towns of Calw and Nagold in 1872. In 1874 the Nagold Valley Railway was completed, running through from Pforzheim via Calw-Nagold to Horb.

In Herbertingen the Allgäu line branched in 1869 via Saulgau–Aulendorf to Waldsee. There it went in 1870 as far as Kisslegg and in 1872 to Leutkirch im Allgäu; in 1874 Isny received its own railway station.

Finally the state railway expanded its network by building the following routes:

- 1876–1880 Murr Valley line: Waiblingen–Backnang–Schwäbisch Hall-Hessental as wells as the Backnang–Bietigheim/Ludwigsburg branch
- 1878–1880 Kraichgau line: Heilbronn–Eppingen
- 1879–1892 Gäu line/Kinzig Valley line: Stuttgart–Herrenberg–Freudenstadt–Schiltach–Schramberg
- 1892–1893 Echaz line Reutlingen–Lichtenstein–Münsingen

A detailed article in German on the development of the network is at History of the Railway in Württemberg

== Rolling stock ==
Until about 1865, the K.W.St.E.'s railway technology was based, not on an English prototype like the majority of German states, but on the United States. As far as rolling stock was concerned, this meant, for example, that locomotives as well as coaches used bogies. This more advanced route was temporarily given up under strong influences, predominantly from Prussia.

Responsible for the procurement and conversion of locomotives from 1885 to 1896, amongst others, was chief engineer Adolf Klose. Under his leadership compound locomotives and rack railway engines were procured for the first time. He also built a type of running gear to improve the curve running of locomotives.

He was followed by Eugen Kittel. He introduced superheating into Württemberg. Under his direction were, inter alia, Kittel steam railbuses, Württemberg C express train locomotives and Württemberg K class goods engines brought into service. He also tested petrol and accumulator cars.

In 1913 the statistics showed the following:

- Network length (including private lines): 2,256 km (1,402 mi)
- Stations: 639
- Locomotives: 855
- Railbuses: 17
- Coaches: 2.394
- Post and luggage vans: 760
- Goods wagons (including departmental wagons): 14,565

After defeat in the First World War, the 1919 Reich Constitution ended the independence of the Württemberg railways. By means of a state agreement between the German Empire and the states, the Württemberg State Railways (the Royal title had been dropped after the abdication of King Wilhelm II on 30 November 1918) transferred into Reich ownership on 1 April 1920, and, together with the other former state railways of Bavaria, Prussia, Saxony, Baden, Mecklenburg and Oldenburg, formed the basis of the Deutsche Reichsbahn founded on 1 April 1920.

== In popular culture ==
German landscape painter Hermann Pleuer achieved fame through his impressionistic paintings of the trains and stations belonging to the K.W.St.E.

In everyday speech the German abbreviation for the Royal Württemberg State Railways, K.W.St.E., was jokingly said in the Swabian dialect to stand for „Komm Weible, Steig Ei“ or "Come on woman, climb aboard". Their Baden neighbours had a rather less kind interpretation: „Kein Württemberger Stirbt Ehrlich“ or "No Württemberger dies an honest man!"

The comic song "Auf der schwäb'sche Eisebahne" (On the Swabian railways) has been sung by many artists, and versions can be seen on YouTube. It contrasts the rural and frugal country folk travelling on the modern reality of railways.

== See also ==
- History of the railway in Württemberg
- Kingdom of Württemberg
- List of Württemberg locomotives and railbuses

== Literature ==
- Beck, Bernd (1989). Schwäbische Eisenbahn – Bilder von der Königlich Württembergischen Staatseisenbahn (in German). Tübingen: Gebr. Metz. ISBN 3-921580-78-1.
- Kitter, Eberhard (1973). Die Eisenbahn-Empfangsgebäude im Königreich Württemberg vor 1854 (in German). Stuttgart: Diss.
- Mühl, Albert; Seidel, Kurt (1970). Die Württembergischen Staatseisenbahnen (in German). Stuttgart and Aalen: Theiss. ISBN 3-8062-0032-7.
- Supper, Otto (1981). Die Entwicklung des Eisenbahnwesens im Königreich Württemberg. Denkschrift zum 50. Jahrestag der Eröffnung der ersten Eisenbahnstrecke in Württemberg am 28. Oktober 1845 (in German). Stuttgart: Nachdruck: Kohlhammer. ISBN 3-17-005976-9.
