= Maschinenfabrik Esslingen =

German engineering firm

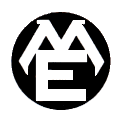
- Company type: Limited company (Aktiengesellschaft)
- Industry: Transport engineering, automotive engineering, mechanical engineering
- Predecessor: Württembergische Baumwoll-Spinnerei und -Weberei
- Founded: 11 March 1846
- Defunct: 1968, formally 2003
- Fate: Taken over by Daimler-Benz in 1965 and eventually integrated into Still GmbH in the Flurfördermittel sector
- Successor: Daimler-Benz AG
- Headquarters: Originally Esslingen am Neckar, later Schönefeld, Germany

Maschinenfabrik Esslingen (ME) was a German engineering firm that manufactured locomotives, tramways, railway wagons, rollbocks, technical equipment for the railways, (turntables and traversers), bridges, steel structures, pumps and boilers.

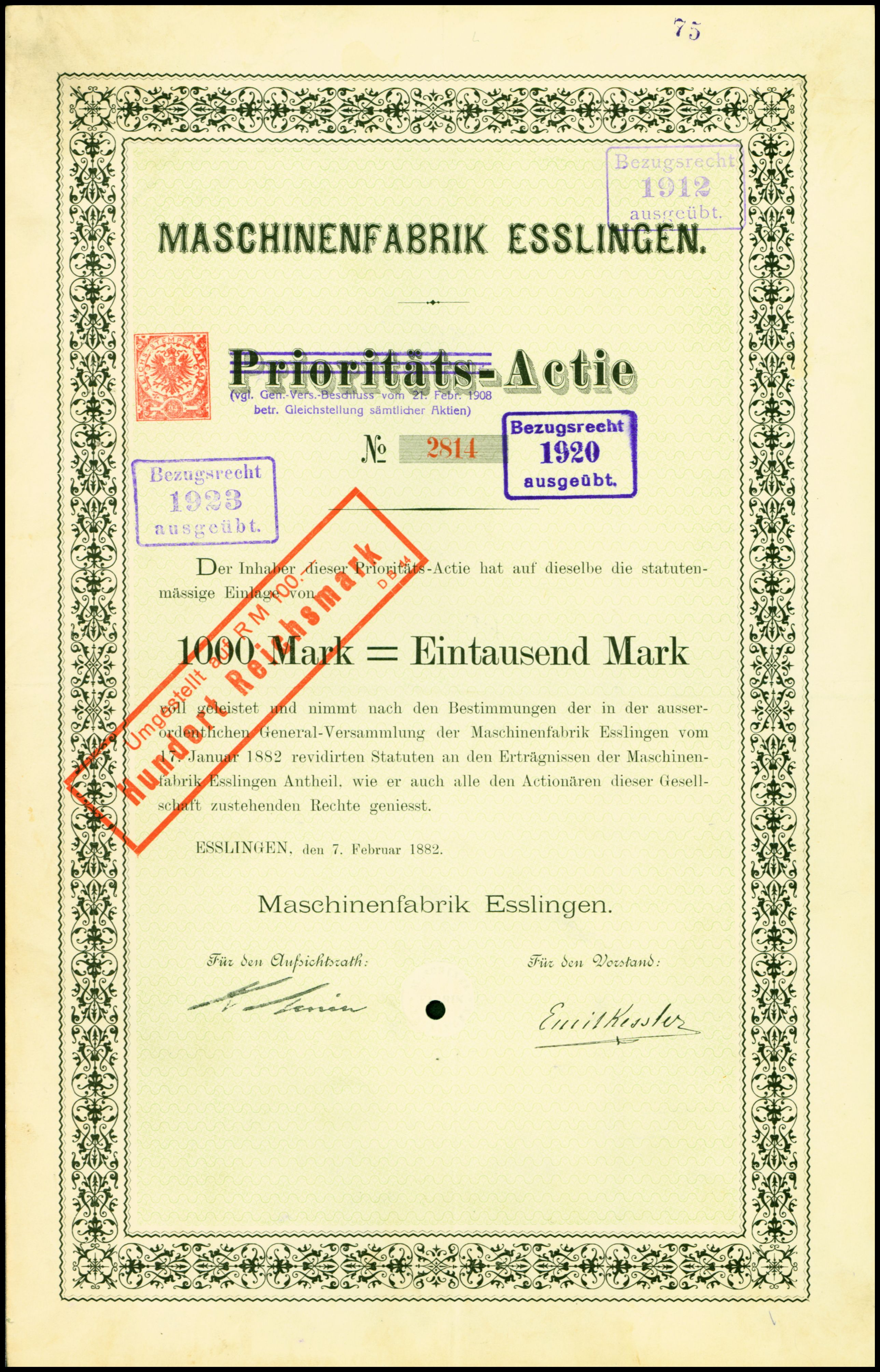
Share of the Maschinenfabrik Esslingen, issued 1882

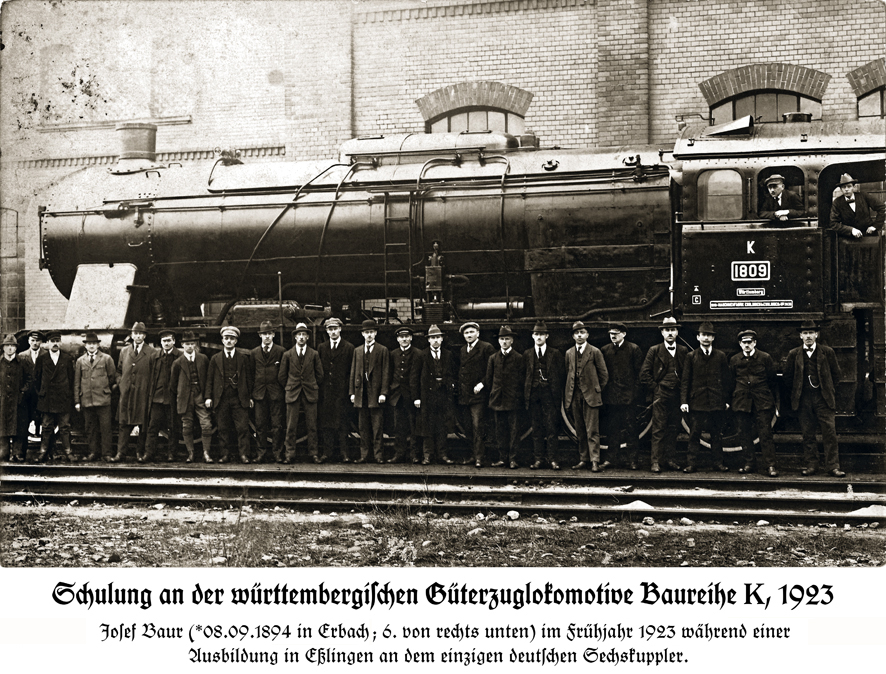
The mighty Württemberg K was one of the most successful locomotives designed and built in Esslingen.

== Founding ==
It was founded by Emil Kessler on 11 March 1846 in Stuttgart, as a result of an initiative of the Kingdom of Württemberg to create a railway industry that was not dependent on foreign manufacturers. Emil Kessler brought vital experience from his time with the engineering works in Karlsruhe, where he had been a member of the board since 1837 and the sole director since 1842.

The foundation stone of the new factory was laid at Esslingen am Neckar on 4 May 1846. One year later, in October 1847, the first locomotive ordered by the Royal Württemberg State Railways (Königlich Württembergische Staats-Eisenbahnen) or K.W.St. E. was delivered.

== History ==
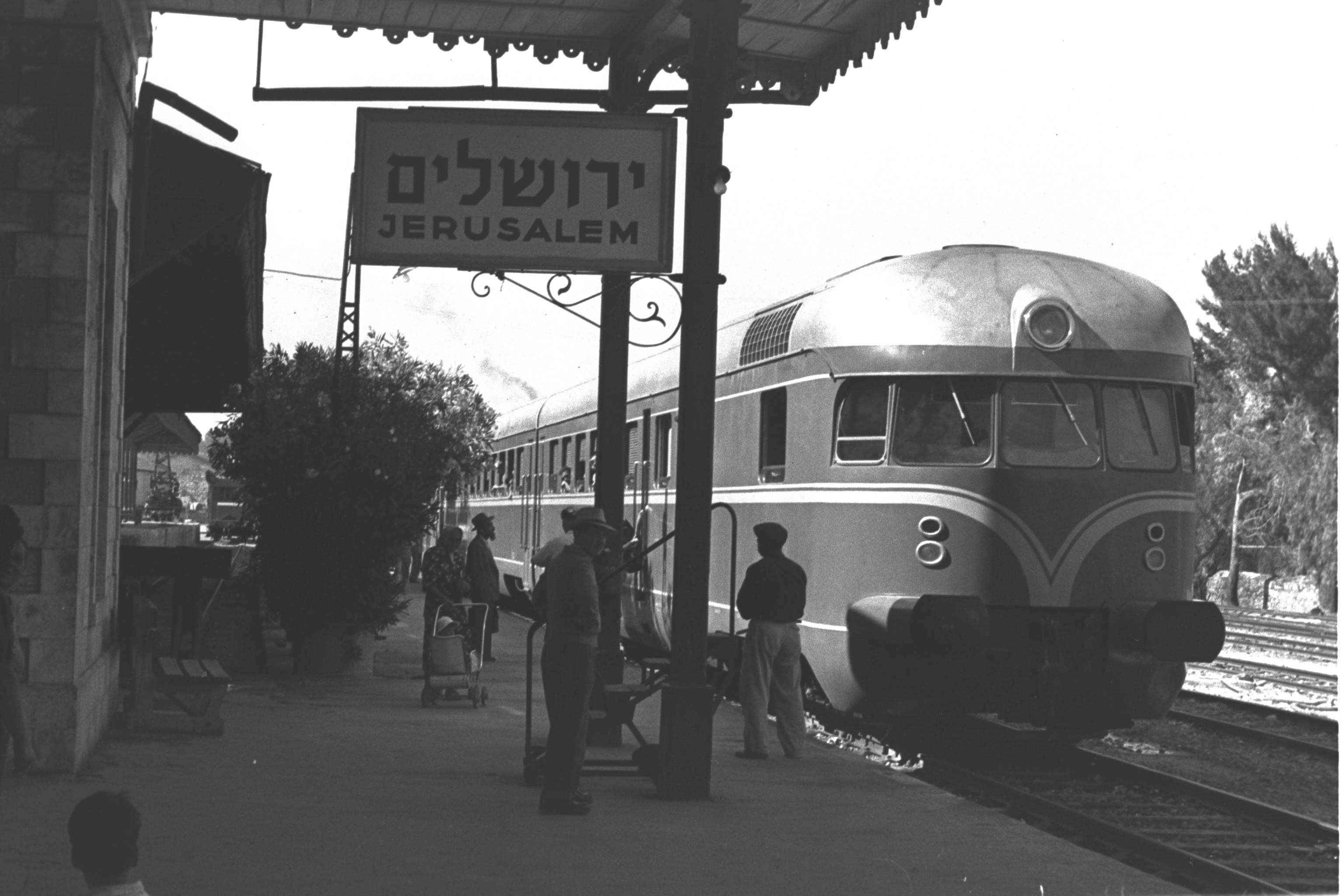
Diesel multiple unit trainset manufactured by Maschinenfabrik Esslingen in the old train station of Jerusalem, shortly after delivery as part of the reparations agreement with West Germany

Esslingen shunting locomotive No. 228 at the service of Israel Railways in 1959

After the death of Emil Kessler in 1867 his 26-year-old son, Emil Kessler, took over the factory. He ran it until his death in 1895. From 1907 another Kessler took the helm of the engineering works: Emil Kessler's youngest son, Ludwig Kessler. Later (but prior to his death in 1931), the director was Julius Rosenthal.

The one thousandth locomotive delivered in 1870 was given the name KESSLER to commemorate the founder of the factory. The engineering works worked closely with the Royal Württemberg State Railways so that almost all new engines for the railway company were built at Esslingen.

The firm earned a very good reputation, initially at home, then increasingly abroad. Several takeovers of other companies (Maschinenfabrik Gebr. Decker & Co. in 1881, Maschinen- & Kesselfabrik G. Kuhn in 1902), the formation of Costruzioni Meccaniche Saronno (Italy) in 1887 and in 1913 the construction of a new factory at Mettingen demonstrated its success.

=== Ships ===
One phase was the construction of ships for inland waters at Ulm and Friedrichshafen, begun in 1852 and stopped by 1858, that saw it through the time of economic crisis after 1848. 50 boats for the river Danube, two steamships for the river Neckar, two steamers and two tugs for Lake Constance and were the result of this thoroughly successful venture.

=== Steelwork ===
Longer-lived was the firm’s involvement in steel structures and bridging, that it continued with until the end.

=== Locomotives ===
Steam

By the 1960s Maschinenfabrik Esslingen had delivered several thousand steam and diesel locomotives worldwide, including numerous special designs. It had a particular reputation for the construction of cog locomotives in many variations, including locomotives for Riggenbach, Abt and Strub rack railways. It was one of these engines that was the last steam locomotive to be made in Esslingen: on 21 October 1966 the last cog locomotive left the factory bound for Indonesia.

== Overview of production figures ==
Year	Produktion for Württemberg	For other German states	For Abroad	Total per year
1847	1	0	0	1
1848	10	3	2	15
1849	6	0	0	6
1850	5	0	0	5
1851	3	0	0	3
1852	6	4	0	10
1853	7	8	2	17
1854	6	8	11	25
1855	5	5	14	24
1856	0	3	33	36
1857	10	0	47	57
1858	0	13	31	44
1859	13	0	35	48
1860	9	7	8	24
1861	10	4	20	34
1862	14	20	12	46
1863	10	24	12	46
1864	12	8	15	35
1865	9	33	8	50
1866	11	20	22	53
1867	12	19	39	70
1868	18	19	20	57
1869	55	16	10	81
1870	6	22	42	70
1871	14	10	51	75
1872	10	34	20	64
1873	2	34	47	83
1874	22	35	11	68
1875	14	33	42	89
1876	1	5	65	71
1877	7	11	50	68
1878	14	0	67	81
1879	0	0	21	21
1880	6	2	25	33
1881	0	5	29	34
1882	0	5	29	34
1883	0	20	66	86
1884	0	3	47	50
1885	2	18	7	27
1886	3	21	42	66
1887	0	2	19	21
1888	9	3	28	40
1889	12	2	22	36
1890	21	6	15	42
1891	22	2	39	63
1892	21	10	33	64
1893	14	3	16	33
1894	13	2	36	51
1895	6	6	40	52
1896	24	0	50	74
Sum	2283 (1847-1896)			

Electric

The company was also involved in the production of electric locomotives, for example, in 1912 for the Wendelsteinbahn. After 1920 a batch of accumulator cars was produced, mainly for coal mines and industrial railways.

Internal combustion

In addition, internal combustion engined locomotives were built, such as the small diesel locomotive, the Köf, the Esslingen railbus and the Russian locomotive class E el-2.

=== Trams ===
Between 1956 and 1965, over 400 Class SSB GT4 articulated four axle trams were built in Esslingen for the Stuttgart tramways, which were in regular operation until 2007. The same model was also built for Freiburg im Breisgau, Neunkirchen, and Reutlingen. In addition, four axle bogie trams were built of the END system. Even the cable car vehicles in Stuttgart were made at Esslingen.

=== Funiculars ===
In 1957, 4 equal 90 cm gauge vehicles, almost identical and same design with a steel base carriage with wheels, have interior with 2 long wood banks along steel walls with glass windows, all painted in exterior with yellow and white colors, running on 900mm gauge tracks, for export to Carris Lisbon were constructed by this German engineering company for Ascensor da Glória and Ascensor do Lavra

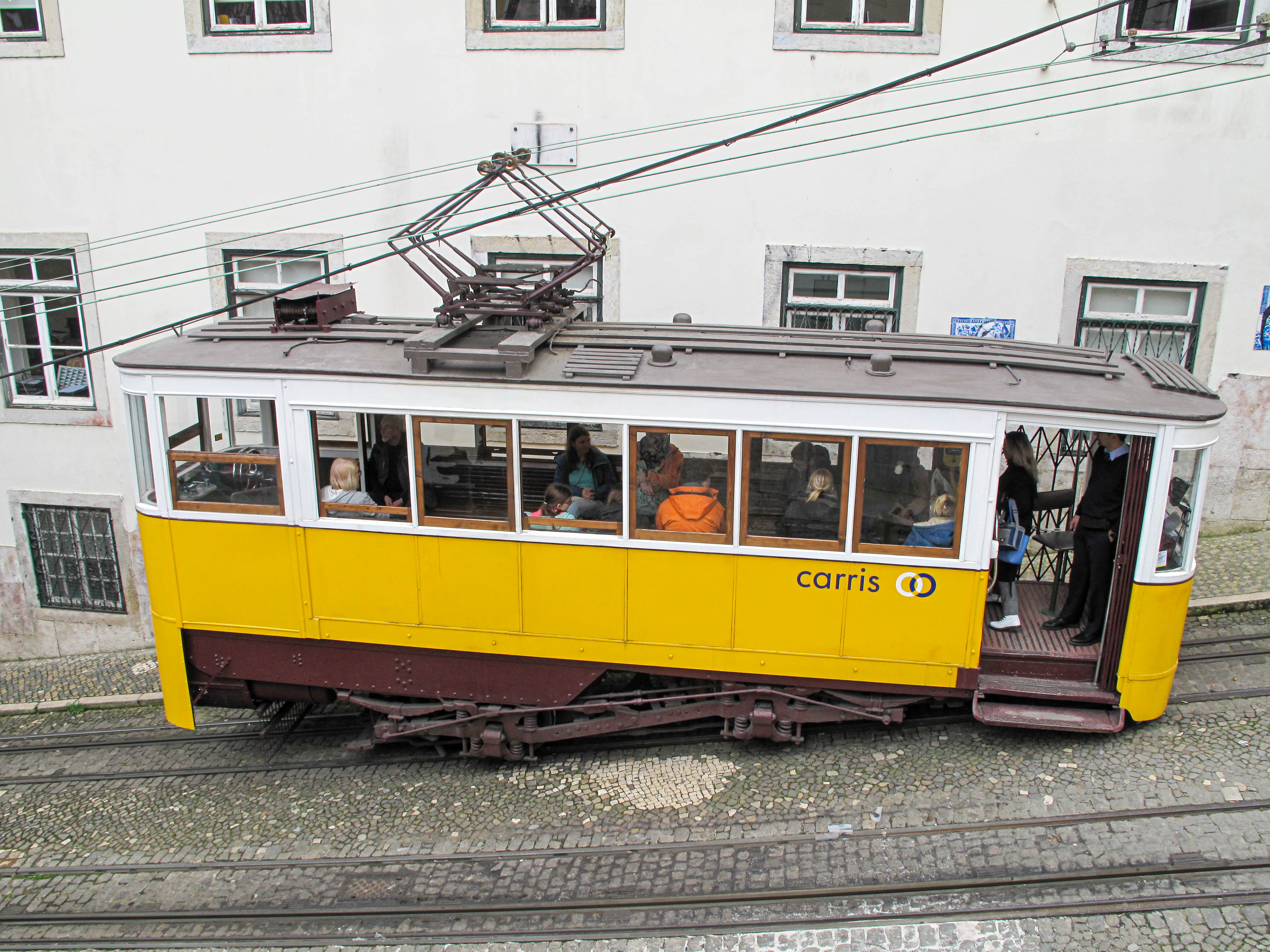
Funicular Tram Glória

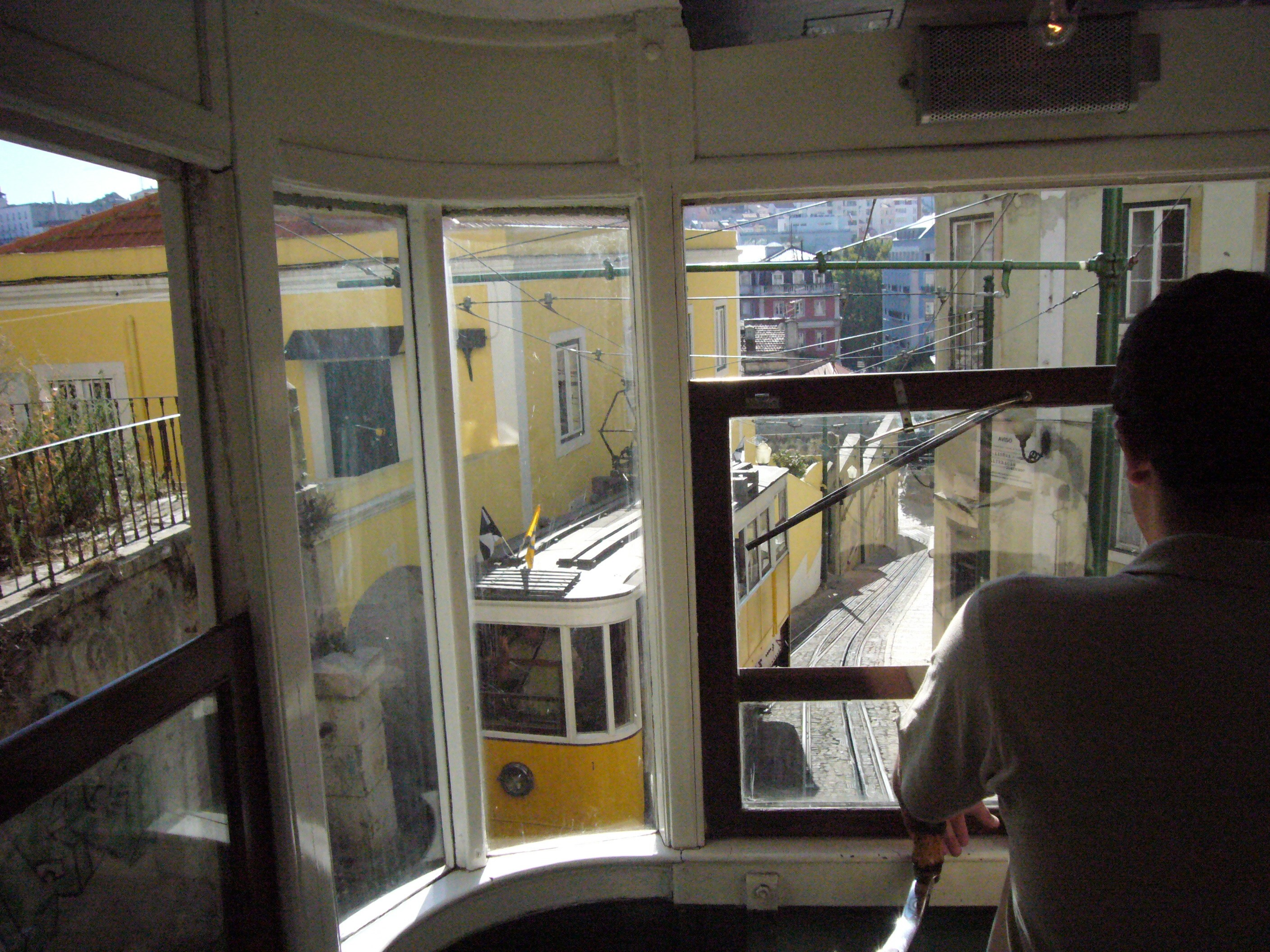
Funicular Tram Lavra

== Demise of locomotive construction ==
Finally the ME became a subsidiary of the Gutehoffnungshütte. In 1965 Daimler-Benz AG bought the company in order to use it factory facilities for its production and the construction of railway vehicles ceased. As of 2007 Maschinenfabrik Esslingen AG still existed, but as a real estate leasing company.

== Preservation of locomotives ==
Today, old locomotives are rebuilt by the Verein zur Erhaltung der Lokomotiven der ME (Society for the Preservation of ME Locomotives) and handed over to museum railways for everyday operations. This society has its base in the old board rooms of the engineering works in Emil-Kessler-Straße in Mettingen on the factory site of Daimler AG.

The last rack locomotive built in Germany for Indonesian State Railways, E10 60 is now used for excursion trains between Sawahlunto and Muarakalaban in West Sumatera.

== Literature ==
- Max Mayer: Lokomotiven, Wagen und Bergbahnen – Geschichtliche Entwicklung in der Maschinenfabrik Eßlingen seit dem Jahre 1846. VDI-Verlag, Berlin 1924.
- Catalogue of the Exhibition Emil Kessler 1813–1867. Exhibition in the Baden State Library, Karlsruhe from 4 November to 2 December 1967, Deutsche Gesellschaft für Eisenbahngeschichte, 1967.
- Wolfgang Messerschmidt: Lokomotiven der Maschinenfabrik Esslingen 1841 bis 1966. Steiger-Verlag, Moers 1984.
- Wolfgang Messerschmidt: Von Lok zu Lok. Esslingen und der Lokomotivbau für die Bahnen der Welt. Franckh´sche Verlagshandlung, Stuttgart 1969.
- Werner Willhaus: Maschinenfabrik Esslingen., Eisenbahn-Kurier Verlag, Freiburg 1999.
- Ludwig Keßler: Aus den Anfängen der Maschinenfabrik Eßlingen. Emil Keßler – sein Leben, sein Werk. Erinnerungsschrift zur 125. Wiederkehr des Geburtstags von Emil Keßler, 1938.
