= Baden IV e =

Baden IV e DRG Class 38.70
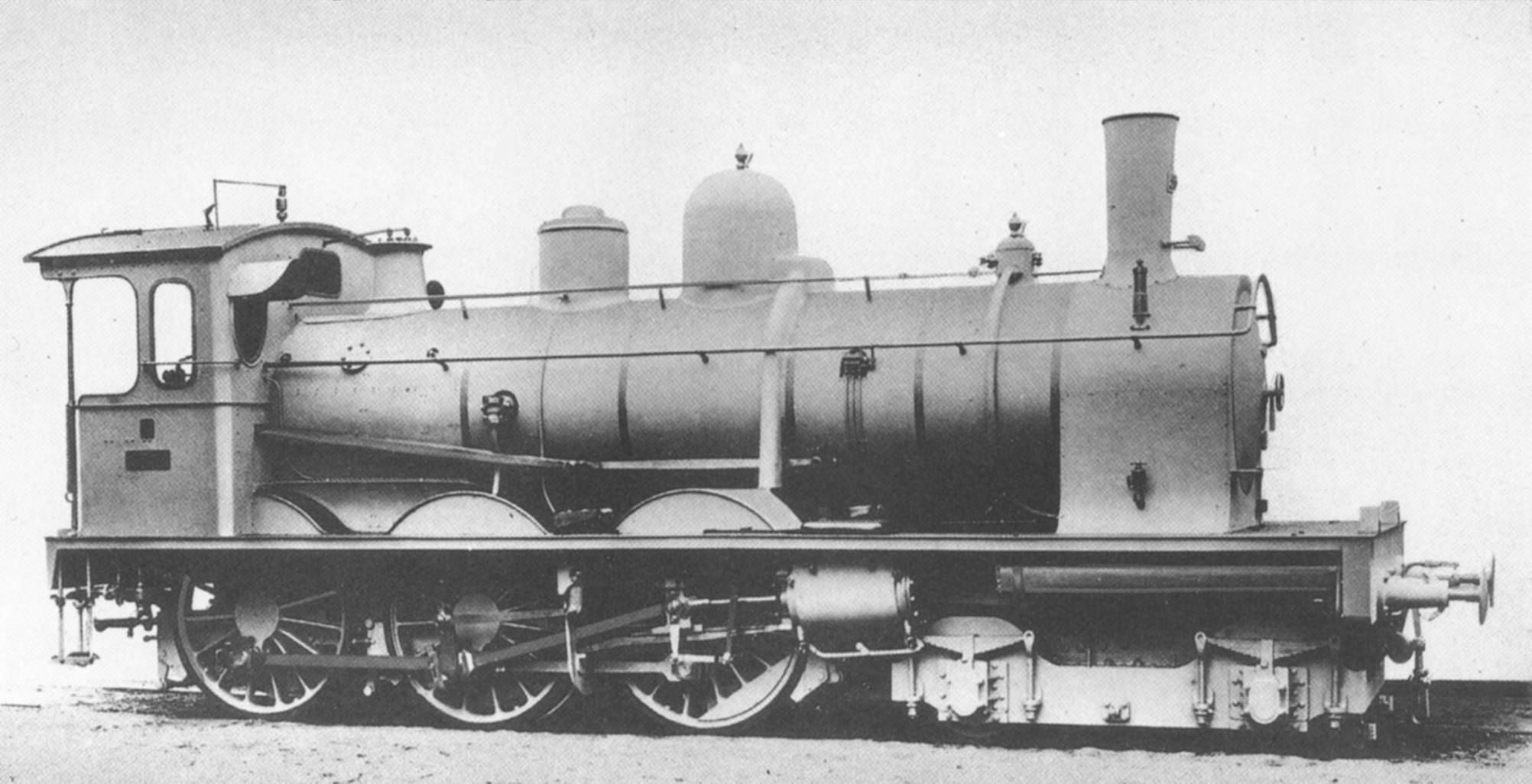
- Werksfoto
Type and origin
- Builder: Grafenstaden, MBG Karlsruhe
- Build date: 1894–1901
- Total produced: 83
Specifications
- Configuration
  - Whyte: 4-6-0
- Gauge: 1,435 mm (4 ft 8 1/2 in)
- Leading dia.: 850 mm (2 ft 9 1/2 in)
- Driver dia.: 1,600 mm (5 ft 3 in)
- Wheelbase
  - Bogie: 1,900 mm (6 ft 2 3/4 in)
  - Overall: 7,450 mm (24 ft 5 1/4 in)
  - incl. tender: 14,875 mm (48 ft 9 3/4 in)
- Length
  - Over beams: 16,960 mm (55 ft 7 3/4 in)
- Height: 4,150 mm (13 ft 7 3/8 in)
- Axle load: 13.90 t (13.68 long tons; 15.32 short tons)
- Adhesive weight: 41.70 t (41.04 long tons; 45.97 short tons)
- Empty weight: 52.80 t (51.97 long tons; 58.20 short tons)
- Service weight: 58.30 t (57.38 long tons; 64.26 short tons)
- Tender type: bad. 2′2′ T 15
- Fuel capacity: 5 t (4.9 long tons; 5.5 short tons) of coal
- Water cap.: 15 m^{3} (3,300 imp gal; 4,000 US gal)
- Boiler
- No. of heating tubes: 191
- Heating tube length: 4,250 mm (13 ft 11 1/4 in)
- Boiler pressure: 13 kgf/cm^{2} (1.27 MPa; 185 lbf/in^{2})
- Heating surface
  - Firebox: 2.10 m^{2} (22.6 sq ft)
  - Radiative: 11.17 m^{2} (120.2 sq ft)
  - Evaporative: 125.93 m^{2} (1,355.5 sq ft)
- Cylinders: 4
- High-pressure cylinder: 550 mm (21 5/8 in)
- Low-pressure cylinder: 350 mm (13 3/4 in)
- Piston stroke: 640 mm (25 3/16 in)
- Valve gear: Walschaerts (Heusinger)
Performance figures
- Maximum speed: 90 km/h (56 mph)
- Indicated power: 778–811 PS (572–596 kW; 767–800 hp)
Career
- Numbers: G.Bad.St.E: 18…356, 552–556, 575–595, 622–628, 664–690; DRG: 38 7001 – 38 7007, 38 7021–7025, 38 7031–7034, 38 7041–7046, 38 7061–7073
- Retired: by 1932

The locomotives of Baden Class IV e were designed and built for the Grand Duchy of Baden State Railway in the late 19th century by the Elsässischen Maschinenbau-Gesellschaft Grafenstaden, who supplied the first eight examples in 1894. They were the first locomotives in Germany with a 4-6-0 wheel arrangement. Another 75 locomotives were built up to 1901 by the Maschinenbau-Gesellschaft Karlsruhe.

== History ==
The Baden IV e engines were created primarily for express and passenger train duties on the steep lines of the Schwarzwaldbahn. This had become necessary, because the locomotives that had been employed hitherto, the IV b, IV c tender locomotives and the IV d tank engines, were unable to meet the growing demands placed on them.

In France, the Compagnie des chemins de fer du Midi, purchased a copy of this engine for its difficult Béziers-Neussargues line. It proved successful and 30 others were built, in France (Midi 1401 to 1431) and were still running in 1938. Also, Midi 1301 to 1470 are closely related but with bigger drivers. The Chemins de Fer du Nord borrowed one of these engines and quickly ordered 50 of them. These were the first engines of the very successful Nord 3.078 to 3.354 (built between 1897 and 1913; withdrawn between the 1940s and 1962).

In 1914 all the engines were still on the books of the Baden state railway. However they were replaced in the express service role as early as 1903 by the II d and IV f. In 1925, the Deutsche Reichsbahn incorporated the remaining 35 examples into DRG Class 38.70; they were given – in groupings based on their delivery batches – the running numbers 38 7001 – 38 7007, 38 7021 – 38 7025, 38 7031 – 38 7034, 38 7041 – 38 7046 and 38 7061 – 38 7073. The engines were all withdrawn from service by 1932.

Fifteen locomotives were surrendered as reparations:

- Thirteen locomotives were handed over to France; there were assigned to the Chemin de fer de l'État and were renumbered 230-901 to 230-913. They were retired between 1929 and 1937.
- Two locomotives went to the État-Belge (Belgian State Railway, the forerunner of today's SNCB). They were withdrawn in 1924.

Number 38 7001 was sectioned in September 1936 and was displayed in the University of Karlsruhe (TH). The facility was bombed in 1944 and the burned remains of 38 7001 were sold for scrap after the war.

== Design features ==
In spite of the shortcomings in ride of the Grafenstaden outside-frame bogies, the locomotive had smooth riding qualities. The engine had a riveted interior plate frame and the coupled wheels had springs under the axle boxes, that were not linked by compensating levers.

An innovative feature, for Germany, of the IV e was the use of a four-cylinder, de Glehn compound, that was employed for the first time on a locomotive with three coupled axles. The Alsace engineering company had previously built four-coupled locomotives with De-Glehn engines – especially for the Chemins de Fer du Nord. Very similar engines to the Baden IV e were soon delivered to Prussia (as the Prussian P 7), to the Imperial Railways in Alsace-Lorraine (as the P 7 and S 9), and to most French railways, as well as to Belgium, Spain and Portugal.

The high-pressure cylinder was outside and drove the middle coupled wheels, whilst the inside low-pressure cylinders drove the leading coupled axle. These two cylinders were slightly angled.

The compound engine was chosen to strike a balance between the high tractive effort required when hauling uphill which would be provided by smaller diameter wheels and the lower axle forces when running downhill that favoured larger wheel diameters. The low and high pressure engines could be controlled separately. This made it easier to start up. On trial runs on routes with an incline of 17.6‰ (1 in 56.8) a power of 581 to 636 indicated horsepower (433 to 474 kW) was measured for a speed of 30 km/h (19 mph). The highest value was between 778 and 811 ihp (580 and 605 kW). With a 250 tonne train, it could reach a speed of 75 km/h (47 mph) on the level and 40 km/h (25 mph) on an incline of 10‰ (1 in 100).

The locomotives were equipped with tenders of the Baden classes 3 T 13,5, bad 3 T 14 and bad 2′2′ T 15.

== See also ==
- Grand Duchy of Baden State Railway
- List of Baden locomotives and railbuses
