= Baden VI c =

Baden VI c DRG Class 75.4,10–11
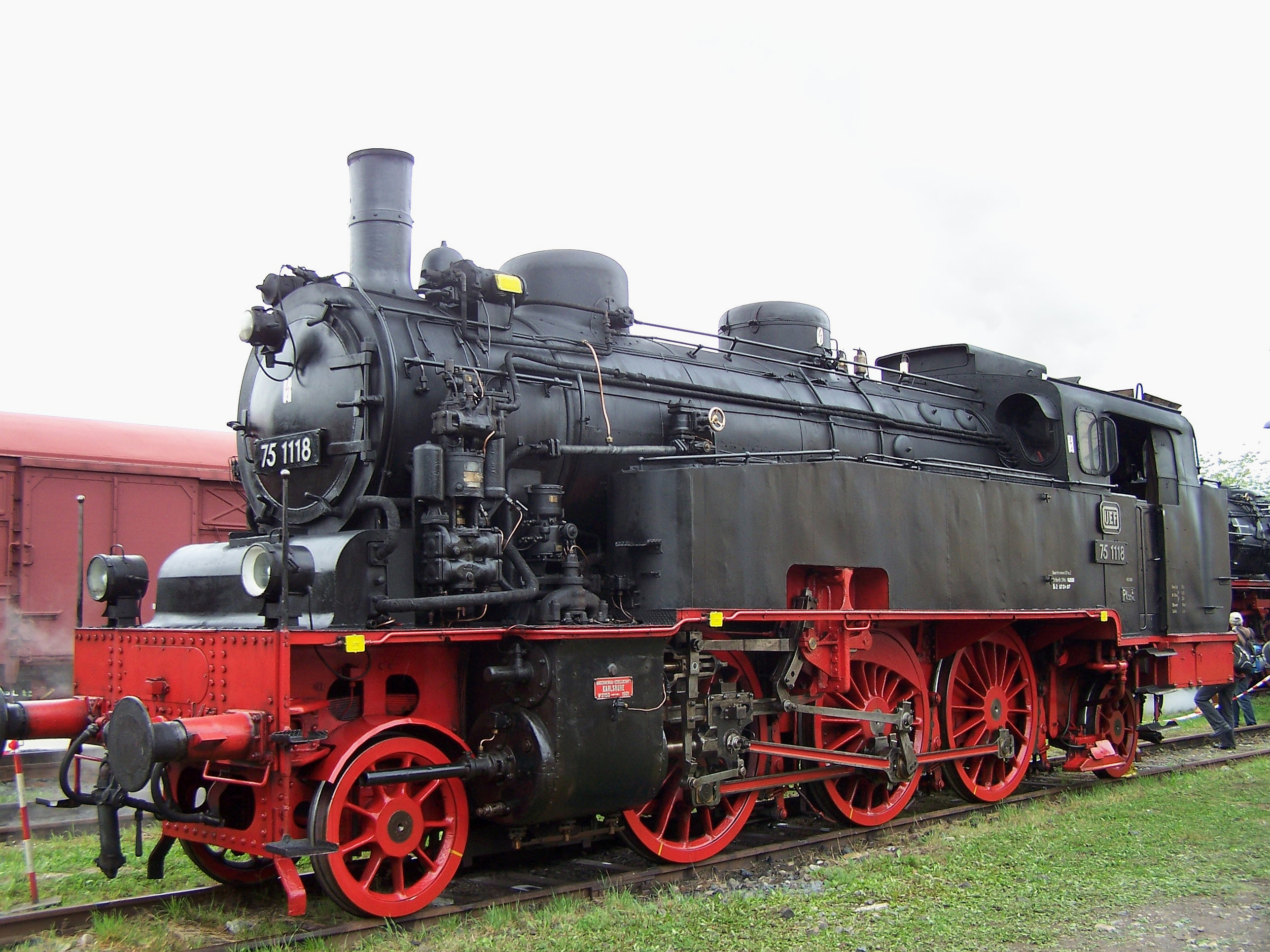
- DB 75 1118 at Meiningen Steam Locomotive Works (2007)
Type and origin
- Builder: MBG Karlsruhe (112); Arnold Jung Lokomotivfabrik (23)
- Build date: 1914–1921
- Total produced: 135
Specifications
- Configuration
  - Whyte: 2-6-2T
- Gauge: 1,435 mm (4 ft 8 1/2 in)
- Leading dia.: 990 mm (3 ft 3 in)
- Driver dia.: 1,600 mm (5 ft 3 in)
- Trailing dia.: 990 mm (3 ft 3 in)
- Length
  - Over beams: 12.700 m (41 ft 8 in)
- Axle load: 16.4 tonnes (16.1 long tons; 18.1 short tons)
- Adhesive weight: 47.8 tonnes (47.0 long tons; 52.7 short tons)
- Service weight: 76.2 tonnes (75.0 long tons; 84.0 short tons)
- Boiler pressure: 12 bar (1.20 MPa; 174 psi)
- Heating surface
  - Firebox: 2.12 m^{2} (22.8 sq ft)
  - Evaporative: 105.22 m^{2} (1,132.6 sq ft)
- Superheater
  - Heating area: 43.02 m^{2} (463.1 sq ft)
- Cylinder size: 540 mm (21 1/4 in)
- Piston stroke: 640 mm (25 3/16 in)
Performance figures
- Maximum speed: 90 km/h (56 mph)
- Indicated power: 580 kW (780 hp)
Career
- Numbers: Baden: 900–909, 875–894, 910–971; DRG: 75 401...494, 1001–1023, 1101–1120
- Retired: 1969

The first steam locomotives of the Baden Class VI c were delivered in 1914 by the Maschinenbau-Gesellschaft Karlsruhe for service in southwestern Germany with the Grand Duchy of Baden State Railway (Großherzoglich Badische Staatsbahn).

== Design ==
Their design benefited from experience with the Baden VI b steam engines, but they were a fundamentally different class with a superheater, new running gear with larger wheels and a longer, fixed wheelbase. The boiler was pitched higher, and the double steam dome was done away with, along with its connecting pipe.

== Service ==
The Grand Duchy of Baden State Railway procured a total of 135 of these engines between 1914 and 1921 in nine batches. After the end of the First World War, 15 locomotives had to be given away to France and 13 to Belgium as part of the reparations required under the terms of the Versailles Treaty. The French locomotives went to the Chemins de fer de l'État who numbered them 32-901 to 32-915; they were retired from service by 1945. The Belgian locomotives went to the État-Belge, who added 6000 to their Baden numbers; after a few years they went the Chemins de fer Prince-Henri (PH) who renumbered them 251–263.

The remaining 107 went to the Deutsche Reichsbahn. The lighter units of the first seven series were grouped into DRG Class 75.4, the heavier vehicles with a reinforced locomotive frame of the last two series were designated as DRG Class 75.10-11.

After the Second World War 66 Class VI c engines went into the Deutsche Bundesbahn, where they were stationed at various locomotive depots including Freiburg, Offenburg, Radolfzell, Singen, Waldshut, Karlsruhe and Villingen.

The 13 Luxembourg locomotives had been taken over by the Deutsche Reichsbahn during the war; they had been renumbered 75 1121 to 75 1133. Eleven were returned to PH's successor, Société Nationale des Chemins de Fer Luxembourgeois (CFL), who renumbered them 3501 to 3513, omitting 3506 and 3509.

Four locomotives, 75 402, 404, 460, 493, were found by the SNCF in Alsace and taken into stock as 1-131.TX., keeping the last 3 digits of their Deutsche Reichsbahn number.

== Withdrawal ==
In France, the SNCF had retired 3-131.TB 901 to 915 (the former État locomotives) by 1945; although one, 3-131.TB.909, was retained as a static instructional locomotive until 1967. The 131.TX locomotives lasted until 1952.

In Luxembourg, the CFL retired its 3500-series between 1957 and 1963.

In 1967 the last one serving with the Bundesbahn, number 75 1118, was retired. The Deutsche Reichsbahn in East Germany still had some of these engines working at that time.

== Preserved ==
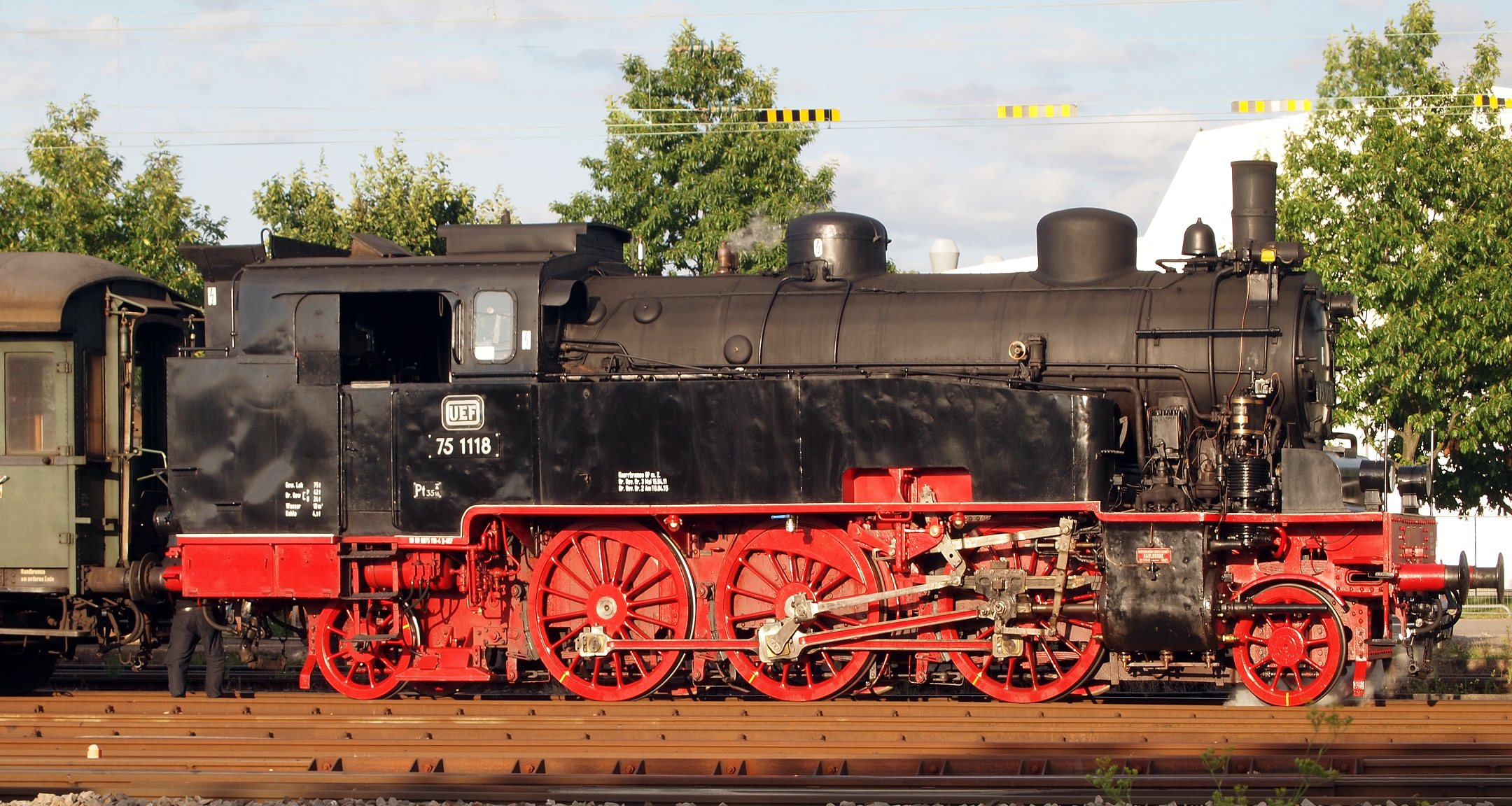
75 1118 in 2017 on the Alb Valley Railway

Number 75 1118 is operated today by the Ulmer Eisenbahnfreunde ('Ulm Railway Friends') on the branch line from Amstetten to Gerstetten about 20 kilometres northwest of Ulm.

== See also ==
- Grand Duchy of Baden State Railway
- List of Baden locomotives and railbuses
