= Baden X b =

Baden X b DRG Class 92.2–3 DB Class 92.2–3 DR Class 92.2–3 SNCB/NMBS Type 91
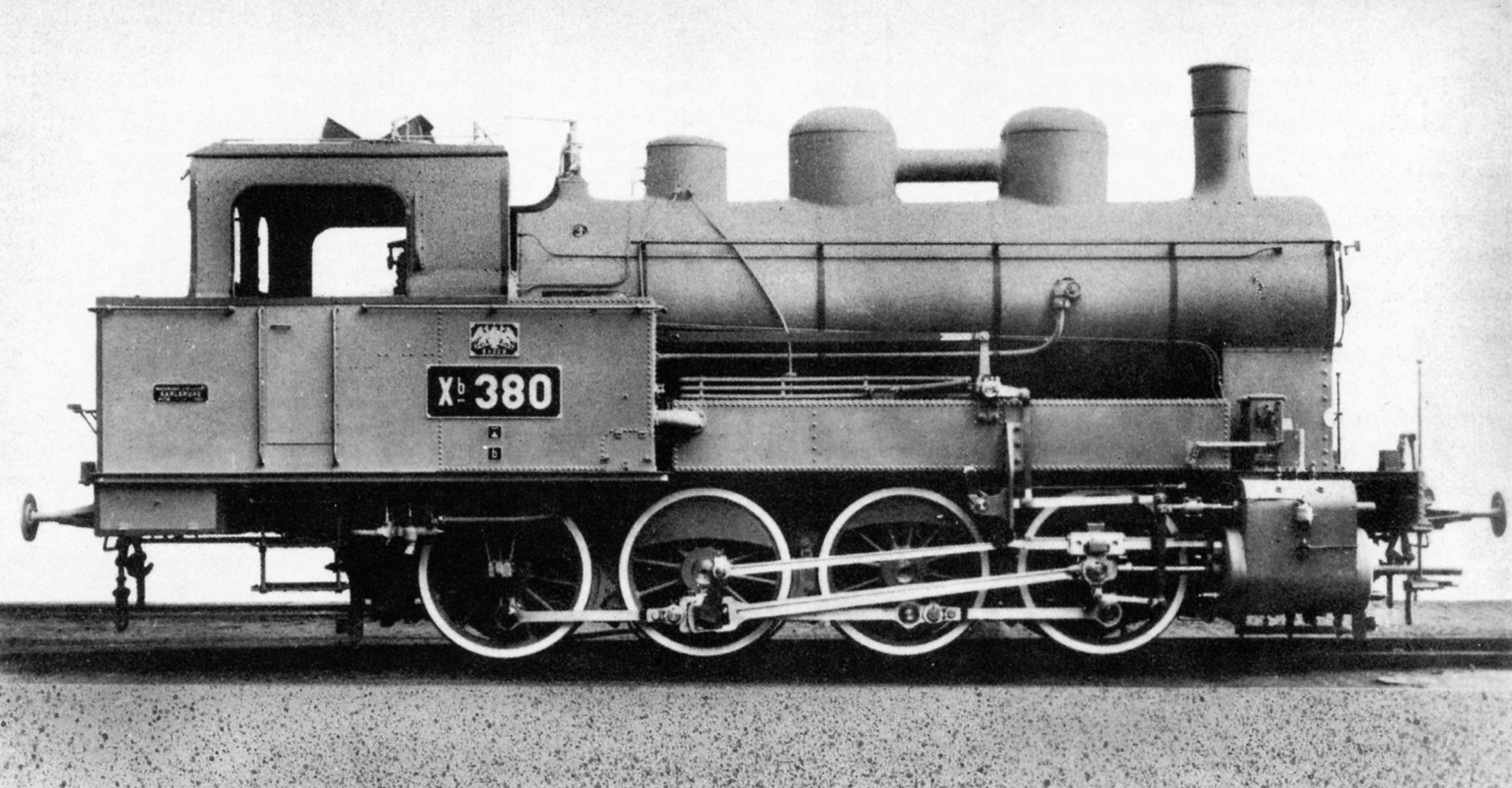
- Baden X b Number 380 (MGB Karlsruhe 1738 of 1908)
Type and origin
- Power type: Steam
- Builder: MBG Karlsruhe (68); Maffei (30)
- Build date: 1907–1921
- Total produced: 98
Specifications
- Configuration
  - Whyte: 0-8-0T
  - UIC: D n2t
- Gauge: 1,435 mm (4 ft 8 1/2 in)
- Driver dia.: 1,262 mm (4 ft 1 5/8 in)
- Wheelbase
  - Engine: 4,350 mm (14 ft 3 1/4 in)
- Length
  - Over buffers: 10,650 mm (34 ft 11 1/4 in); 10,694 mm (35 ft 1 in)
- Height: 4,500 mm (14 ft 9 3/16 in)
- Axle load: 14.5 tonnes (14.3 long tons; 16.0 short tons)
- Adhesive weight: 58.1–58.2 tonnes (57.2–57.3 long tons; 64.0–64.2 short tons)
- Empty weight: 43.5–44.2 tonnes (42.8–43.5 long tons; 48.0–48.7 short tons)
- Service weight: 58.1–58.2 tonnes (57.2–57.3 long tons; 64.0–64.2 short tons)
- Fuel capacity: Coal: 2.5 tonnes (2.5 long tons; 2.8 short tons)
- Water cap.: 7,000 litres (1,500 imp gal; 1,800 US gal)
- Firebox
  - Grate area: 1.75 m^{2} (18.8 sq ft)
- Boiler
  - Pitch: 2,700 mm (8 ft 10 1/4 in)
  - Tube plates: 3,750 mm (12 ft 3 5/8 in)
  - Small tubes: 52 mm (2 1/16 in), 185 off
- Boiler pressure: 13.0 bar (1.30 MPa; 13.3 kg/cm^{2}; 189 psi)
- Heating surface
  - Firebox: 7.76–8.23 m^{2} (83.5–88.6 sq ft)
  - Tubes: 102.43 m^{2} (1,102.5 sq ft)
  - Total surface: 110.19–110.66 m^{2} (1,186.1–1,191.1 sq ft)
- Cylinder size: 480 mm × 630 mm (18 7/8 in × 24 13/16 in)
- Valve gear: Heusinger (Walschaerts)
Performance figures
- Maximum speed: 45 km/h (28 mph)
- Indicated power: 500 PS (370 kW; 490 hp)
Career
- Numbers: DRG 92 201 – 92 232 DRG 92 241 – 92 320
- Retired: by 1966

The Baden X b of the Grand Duchy of Baden State Railway was a class of 0-8-0T steam locomotive designed for heavy shunting.

In 1925 out of the 98 examples built, 90 entered the Deutsche Reichsbahn as DRG Class 92.2–3 in their numbering plan. Of these, 80 were taken over by the Deutsche Bundesbahn and two by the Deutsche Reichsbahn (GDR).

== See also ==
- Grand Duchy of Baden State Railway
- List of Baden locomotives and railbuses
