= Baden I b =

Baden I b DRG Class 88.75
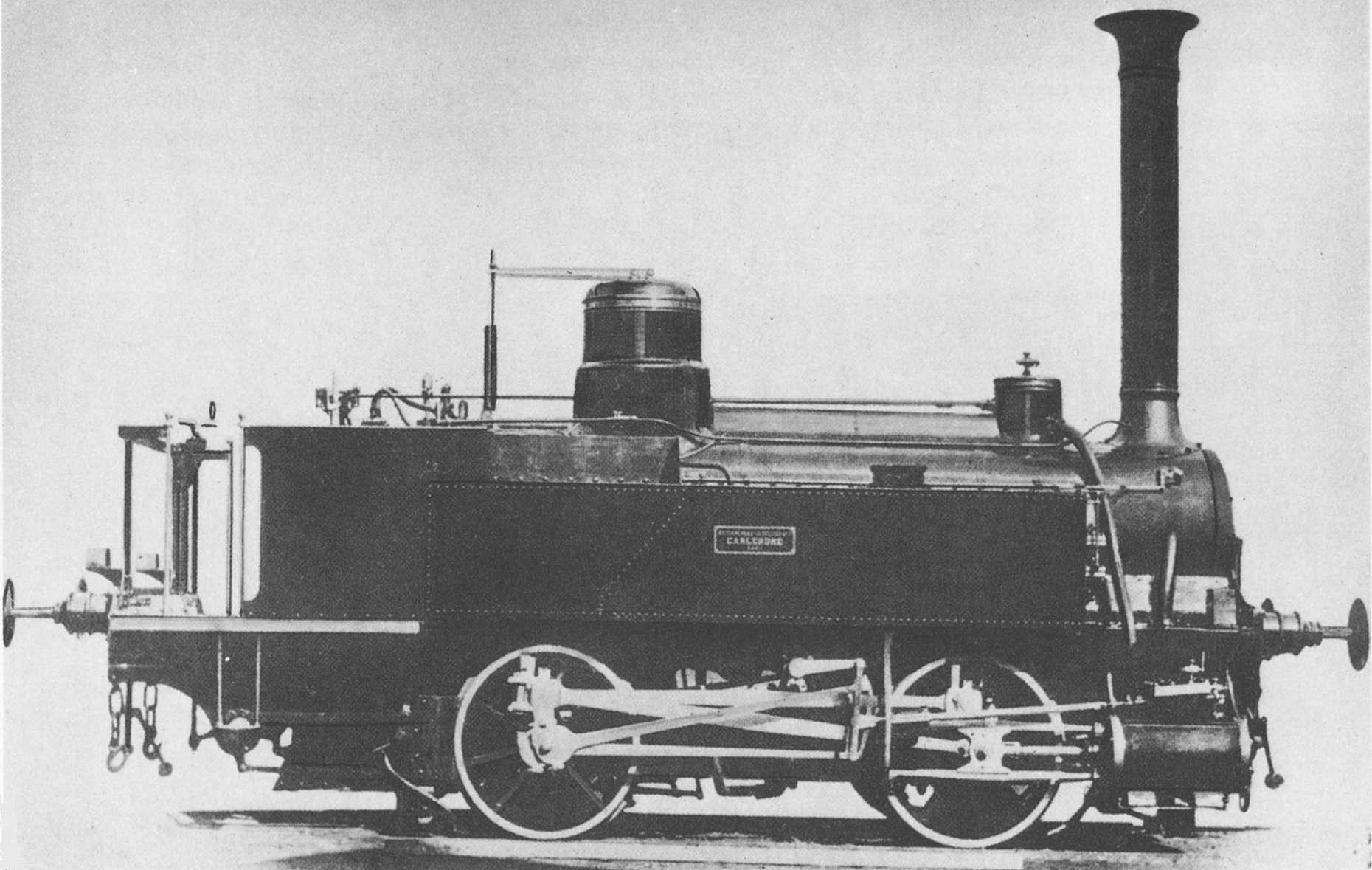
Type and origin
- Builder: MBG Karlsruhe
- Build date: 1874–1893
- Total produced: 3
Specifications
- Configuration
  - Whyte: 0-4-0T
  - German: Gt 22.12
- Gauge: 1,435 mm (4 ft 8 1/2 in)
- Driver dia.: 1 b^{1}: 940 mm (3 ft 1 in); 1 b^{2}: 960 mm (3 ft 1 3/4 in)
- Wheelbase
  - Overall: 2,100 mm (82 3/4 in)
- Length
  - Over beams: 6,925 mm (22 ft 8 3/4 in)
- Height: 3,960 mm (12 ft 11 7/8 in)
- Axle load: 12.1 t (11.9 long tons; 13.3 short tons)
- Adhesive weight: 24.2 t (23.8 long tons; 26.7 short tons)
- Service weight: 24.2 t (23.8 long tons; 26.7 short tons)
- Fuel capacity: 700 kg (1,500 lb) of coal
- Water cap.: 2.25 m^{3} (490 imp gal; 590 US gal)
- Boiler
- No. of heating tubes: 125
- Heating tube length: 3,140 mm (10 ft 3 1/2 in)
- Boiler pressure: 10 kgf/cm^{2} (981 kPa; 142 lbf/in^{2})
- Heating surface
  - Firebox: 0.73 m^{2} (7.9 sq ft)
  - Radiative: 4.95 m^{2} (53.3 sq ft)
  - Evaporative: 46.95 m^{2} (505.4 sq ft)
- Cylinders: 2
- Cylinder size: 280 mm (11 in)
- Piston stroke: 460 mm (18 1/8 in)
- Valve gear: Stephenson
Performance figures
- Maximum speed: 45 km/h (28 mph)
Career
- Numbers: G.Bad.St.E.: 402, 403, 240; DRG: 88 7501 – 88 7503
- Retired: 1926

The Baden Class I b locomotives of the Grand Duchy of Baden State Railways were built for the pontoon bridges from Heidelberg to Speyer. Altogether three of these engines were on duty, of which two had been taken over from the Palatinate Railway in 1874. A third machine was procured directly from the Maschinenbau-Gesellschaft Karlsruhe in 1893.

All three locomotives were taken over by the Deutsche Reichsbahn as DRG Class 88.75. Shortly thereafter they were retired, however, as locomotives of the Bavarian Class D VI took over pontoon bridge operations.

This class should not be confused with the earlier class with the same designation which is usually referred to as the Baden I b (old) to distinguish it.

== See also ==
- Grand Duchy of Baden State Railway
- List of Baden locomotives and railbuses
