= Baden I e =

Baden I e DRG Class 88.75
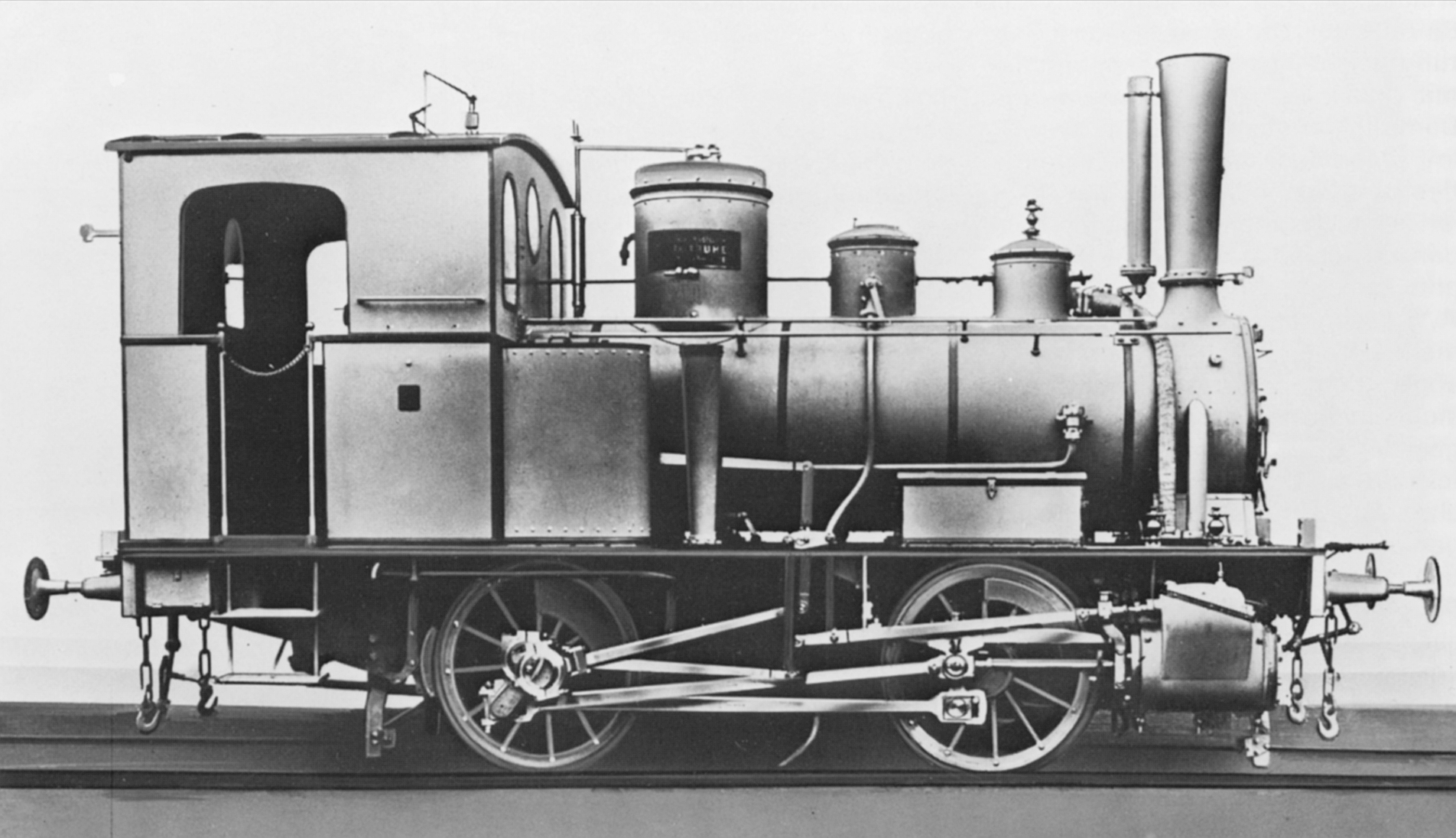
Type and origin
- Builder: MBG Karlsruhe
- Build date: 1887–1893
- Total produced: 30 (DRG: 25)
Specifications
- Configuration
  - Whyte: 0-4-0T
  - German: Gt 22.14
- Gauge: 1,435 mm (4 ft 8 1/2 in)
- Driver dia.: 1,235 mm (4 ft 5/8 in)
- Wheelbase
  - Overall: 2,500 mm (8 ft 2 1/2 in)
- Length
  - Over beams: 7,740 mm (25 ft 4 3/4 in)
- Height: 4,050 mm (13 ft 3 1/2 in)
- Axle load: I e^{1–4}: 14.35 t (14.12 long tons; 15.82 short tons); I e^{5,6}: 14.1 t (13.9 long tons; 15.5 short tons)
- Adhesive weight: I e^{1–4}: 28.7 t (28.2 long tons; 31.6 short tons); I e^{5,6}: 28.2 t (27.8 long tons; 31.1 short tons)
- Empty weight: 22.4 t (22.0 long tons; 24.7 short tons)
- Service weight: I e^{1–4}: 28.7 t (28.2 long tons; 31.6 short tons); I e^{5,6}: 28.2 t (27.8 long tons; 31.1 short tons)
- Fuel capacity: 1,000 kg (2,200 lb) of coal
- Water cap.: 3.5 m^{3} (770 imp gal; 920 US gal)
- Boiler
- No. of heating tubes: 110
- Heating tube length: 3,200 mm (10 ft 6 in)
- Boiler pressure: 10 kgf/cm^{2} (981 kPa; 142 lbf/in^{2})
- Heating surface
  - Firebox: 0.81 m^{2} (8.7 sq ft)
  - Radiative: 4.13 m^{2} (44.5 sq ft)
  - Tubes: I e^{1–4}: 45.34 m^{2} (488.0 sq ft); I e^{5,6}: 49.76 m^{2} (535.6 sq ft)
  - Evaporative: I e^{1–4}: 49.47 m^{2} (532.5 sq ft); I e^{5,6}: 53.89 m^{2} (580.1 sq ft)
- Cylinder size: 325 mm (12 13/16 in)
- Piston stroke: 550 mm (21 5/8 in)
- Valve gear: Ilan
- Loco brake: some had counter-pressure brakes
Performance figures
- Maximum speed: 60 km/h (37 mph)
Career
- Numbers: G.Bad.St.E.: 99 … 481; DRG 88 7511–7515, 7521–7522, 7531–7532, 7541–7548, 7551–7555, 7561–7563
- Retired: 1929

The Baden Class I e locomotives with the Grand Duchy of Baden State Railways were twin-axled tank engines that were built by the Maschinenbaugesellschaft Karlsruhe for duties on branch lines.

Of the total of 30 engines, 25 were taken over by the Deutsche Reichsbahn and, together with the Baden I b grouped into DRG Class 88.75 in the DRG renumbering plan for steam locomotives.

== See also ==
- Grand Duchy of Baden State Railway
- List of Baden locomotives and railbuses
