= Class 88 =

Class 88 may refer to:

- British Rail Class 88 (unbuilt), Originally a proposed electric variant of the Class 58
- British Rail Class 88, Electro-diesel locomotive class
- DRG Class 88, a class of German, 0-4-0T, goods train, tank locomotives operated by the Deutsche Reichsbahn comprising:
  - Class 88.0: BBÖ 184
  - Class 88.0: Mainz harbour railway Nos. 3 to 5
  - Class 88.70: LBE T 1
  - Class 88.71-72: Bavarian D IV
  - Class 88.71^{II}: BBÖ 189
  - Class 88.72^{II}: EWA IId
  - Class 88.73: Palatine T 1
  - Class 88.74: Württemberg T
  - Class 88.75: Baden I b, Baden I e
  - Class 88.76: Bremen harbour railway No. 4a
- Pacific National 88 class narrow gauge diesel locomotive.
