= Baden III b =

Type and origin
- Build date: 1881–1891
- Total produced: about 70
Specifications
- Configuration
  - Whyte: 4-4-0
- Gauge: 1,435 mm (4 ft 8 1/2 in)
- Driver dia.: 1,830 mm (6 ft 0 in)
- Carrying wheel diameter: 950 mm (3 ft 1 3/8 in)
- Wheelbase
  - Overall: 4,500 mm (14 ft 9 1/4 in)
- Length
  - Over beams: 14,082–14,332 mm (46 ft 2 1/2 in – 47 ft 1/4 in)
- Height: 4,150 mm (13 ft 7 1/2 in)
- Adhesive weight: 19.00 t (18.70 long tons; 20.94 short tons)
- Boiler
- Heating tube length: 3,188–3,388 mm (10 ft 5 1/2 in – 11 ft 1 1/2 in)
- Heating surface
  - Firebox: 1.31 m^{2} (14.1 sq ft)

The Baden Class III b engines were German steam locomotives designed for hauling passenger trains for the Grand Duchy of Baden State Railway (Großherzoglich Badische Staatseisenbahn). In this class the Baden state railway grouped rebuilt locomotives of former classes III and III a.

Seventy engines of Baden classes III and III a were rebuilt between 1881 and 1891. They were all given a new, more powerful, three-ring boiler with a larger grate area. Because this was longer than the original boilers, the frame of the Class III had to be extended (on the Class IIIa it was long enough) and a buffer beam built onto the front.

The boiler had a Belpaire firebox with a somewhat higher top surface. A larger steam dome was fitted on top of the rear boiler ring.

== See also ==
- Grand Duchy of Baden State Railway
- List of Baden locomotives and railbuses
