= Baden IV c =

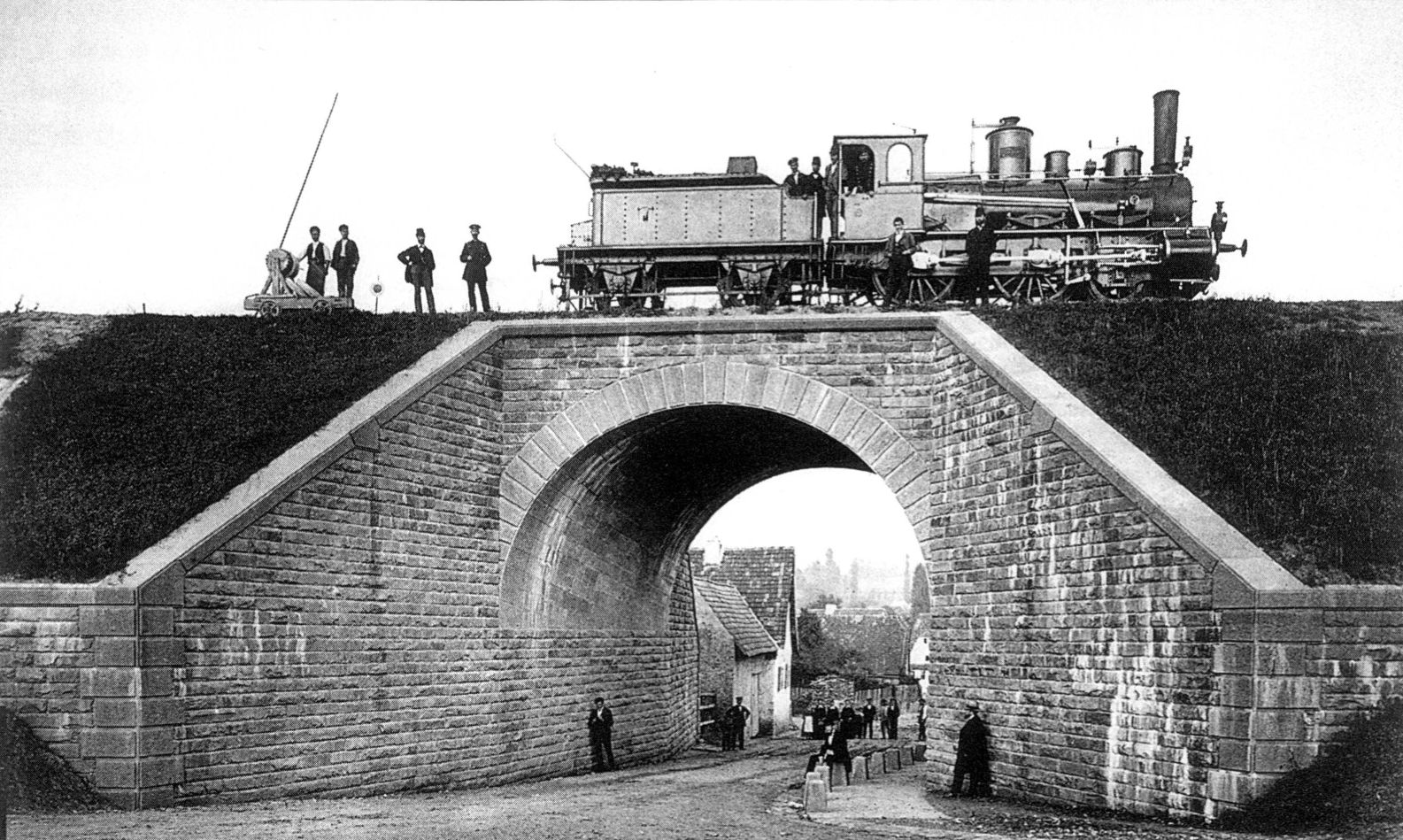
Type and origin
- Builder: MBG Karlsruhe
- Build date: 1875–1887
- Total produced: 59
Specifications
- Configuration
  - Whyte: 2-4-0
- Leading dia.: 1,080 mm (3 ft 6 1/2 in)
- Driver dia.: 1,680 mm (5 ft 6 1/4 in)
- Wheelbase
  - Overall: 3,900 mm (12 ft 9 1/2 in)
- Length
  - Over beams: 14,367 mm (47 ft 1 3/4 in)
- Height: 4,150 mm (13 ft 7 1/2 in)
- Axle load: 11.30 t (11.12 long tons; 12.46 short tons)
- Adhesive weight: 22.50 t (22.14 long tons; 24.80 short tons)
- Empty weight: 31.80 t (31.30 long tons; 35.05 short tons)
- Service weight: 35.50 t (34.94 long tons; 39.13 short tons)
- Boiler
- No. of heating tubes: 198
- Heating tube length: 3,300 mm (10 ft 10 in)
- Boiler pressure: 9.0 kgf/cm^{2} (883 kPa; 128 lbf/in^{2})
- Heating surface
  - Firebox: 1.47 m^{2} (15.8 sq ft)
  - Radiative: 6.03 m^{2} (64.9 sq ft)
  - Tubes: 86.27 m^{2} (928.6 sq ft)
  - Evaporative: 92.30 m^{2} (993.5 sq ft)
- Cylinders: 2
- Cylinder size: 435 mm (17 1/8 in)
- Piston stroke: 610 mm (24 in)
- Valve gear: Stephenson
- Train brakes: Westinghouse compressed air brake
Performance figures
- Maximum speed: 70 km/h (43 mph)
Career
- Numbers: 1 ... 393
- Retired: 1901–1925

The steam locomotives of Baden Class IV c were passenger locomotives operated by Grand Duchy of Baden State Railway in the former south German state of Baden.

== History ==
As part of the purchase of 2-4-0 locomotives in the early 1870s, a total of eight batches of Class IV c engines were ordered. These locomotives were used above all on lines with steep inclines in the Black Forest and the Odenwald. As a result, several engines were equipped with a Riggenbach counter-pressure brake.

== Design features ==
Then dimensions of these engines were largely the same as those of the Class IV b. However the double frame was dropped and replaced by a simple plate frame. The engine had a very short wheelbase and as a result good curve-running performance. In addition the carrying axle had a side play of 10 mm. It was returned to its centre position by sloping bearing surfaces (geneigte Doppelflächen). The grate area of the firebox turned out to be very small; as a result its steam generation was not particularly satisfactory. Trials with ribbed tubes did not produce any improvements. The large steam dome sat on the rear boiler section.

The outside wet-steam engine had inside valves and drove the first coupled axle. The wheels were sprung with leaf springs located over the top, that were linked by a compensating lever between the coupled wheels.

The vehicles were equipped with tenders of classes 2 T 8 or 2 T 6.67. Several locomotives were equipped with rearward-facing driver's cabs on tenders. This enabled them to work routes without a turntable.

== Sources ==
- Hermann Lohr, Georg Thielmann: Lokomotiv-Archiv Baden. transpress, Berlin 1988, ISBN 3-344-00210-4

== See also ==
- Grand Duchy of Baden State Railway
- List of Baden locomotives and railbuses
