= Baden IX b =

Baden IX b DRG Class 97.2
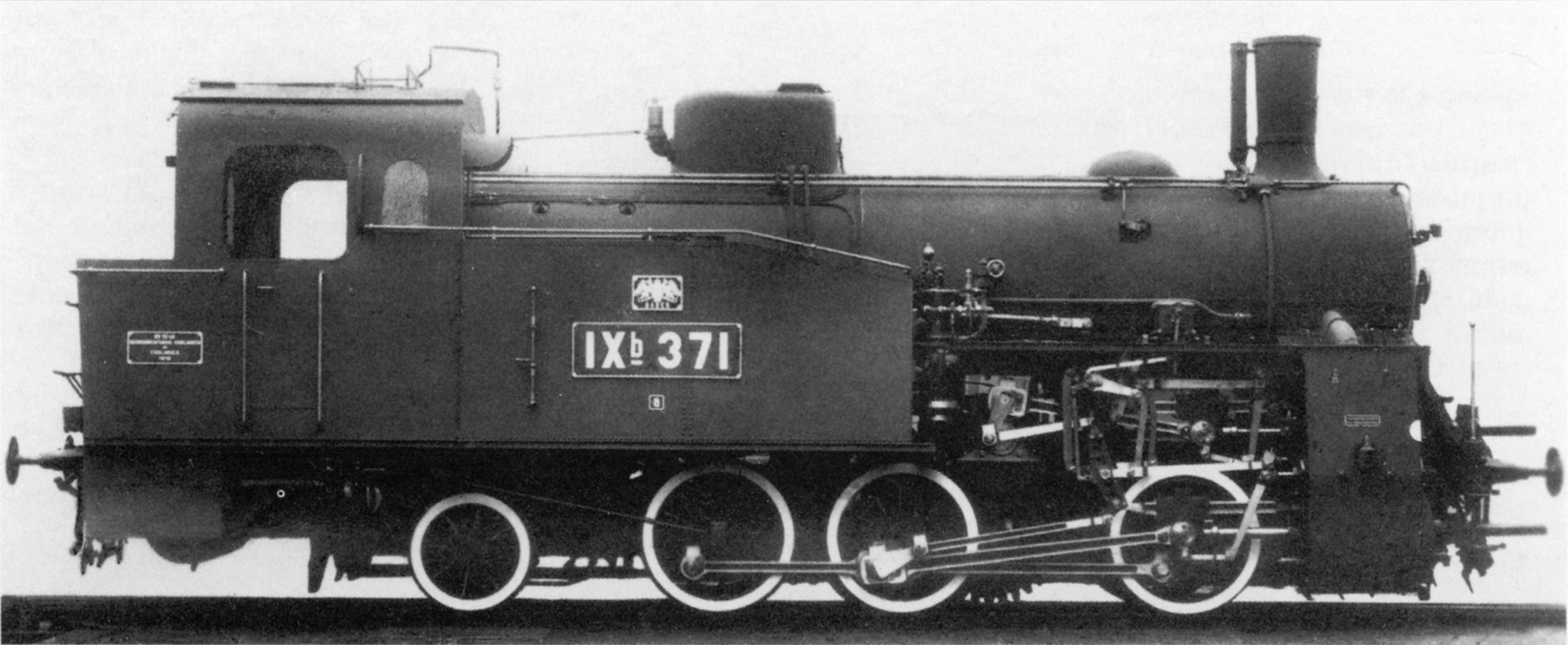
- Baden 371 (Maschinenfabrik Esslingen 3546 of 1910)
Type and origin
- Builder: Maschinenfabrik Esslingen
- Build date: 1910 (4), 1921 (3)
- Total produced: 7
Specifications
- Configuration
  - Whyte: 0-6-2T
  - UIC: C1′ n2(4v)zt
- Gauge: 1,435 mm (4 ft 8 1/2 in)
- Driver dia.: 1,080 mm (3 ft 6 1/2 in)
- Trailing dia.: 850 mm (2 ft 9 1/2 in)
- Wheelbase
  - Overall: 5,050 mm (16 ft 6 3/4 in)
- Rack system: Riggenbach rack system
- Length
  - Over beams: 10.900 m (35 ft 9 1/4 in)
- Height: 4,248 mm (13 ft 11 1/4 in)
- Axle load: 14.3 tonnes (14.1 long tons; 15.8 short tons)
- Adhesive weight: 42.8 tonnes (42.1 long tons; 47.2 short tons)
- Empty weight: 45.3–45.6 tonnes (44.6–44.9 long tons; 49.9–50.3 short tons)
- Service weight: 56.7–57.0 tonnes (55.8–56.1 long tons; 62.5–62.8 short tons)
- Fuel capacity: Coal: 1.5 tonnes (1.5 long tons; 1.7 short tons)
- Water cap.: 5,000 litres (1,100 imp gal; 1,300 US gal)
- Boiler
- No. of heating tubes: 178
- Heating tube length: 3,200 or 3,850 mm (10 ft 6 in or 12 ft 7 1/2 in)
- Boiler pressure: 14 kgf/cm^{2} (1.37 MPa; 199 psi)
- Heating surface
  - Firebox: 1.8 m^{2} (19 sq ft)
  - Radiative: 8.2 m^{2} (88 sq ft)
  - Tubes: 89.43 or 107.5 m^{2} (962.6 or 1,157.1 sq ft)
  - Evaporative: 97.59–115.7 m^{2} (1,050.5–1,245.4 sq ft)
- Superheater
  - Heating area: 25.15 m^{2} (270.7 sq ft)
- Cylinders: 4
- Cylinder size: 450 mm (17 11/16 in)
- Piston stroke: 550 mm (21 5/8 in)
- Cogwheel drive cylinder bore: 450 mm (17 11/16 in)
- Cogwheel drive piston stroke: 550 mm (21 5/8 in)
- Valve gear: Walschaerts (Heusinger)
Performance figures
- Maximum speed: Adhesion: 45 km/h (28 mph); Rack: 18 km/h (11 mph)
Career
- Numbers: G.Bad.St.E.: 344, 345, 371, 736–739; DRG 97 201 – 97 204, 97 251 – 97 253
- Retired: mid-1930s

The Baden Class IX b were German rack railway steam locomotives with the Grand Duchy of Baden State Railways, whose cogwheel drive was designed for running on track with a Riggenbach rack system.

The locomotive was produced in two sub-classes, which were designated as IX b^{1} and IX b^{2}. In 1925, they were grouped by the Deutsche Reichsbahn as DRG Class 97.2 within their renumbering plan. The engines were employed on the Höllentalbahn in the Black Forest until they were eventually and later replaced by DRG Class 85 locomotives.

== See also ==
- Grand Duchy of Baden State Railway
- List of Baden locomotives and railbuses
