= Baden VI b =

Baden VI b DRG Class 75.1–3
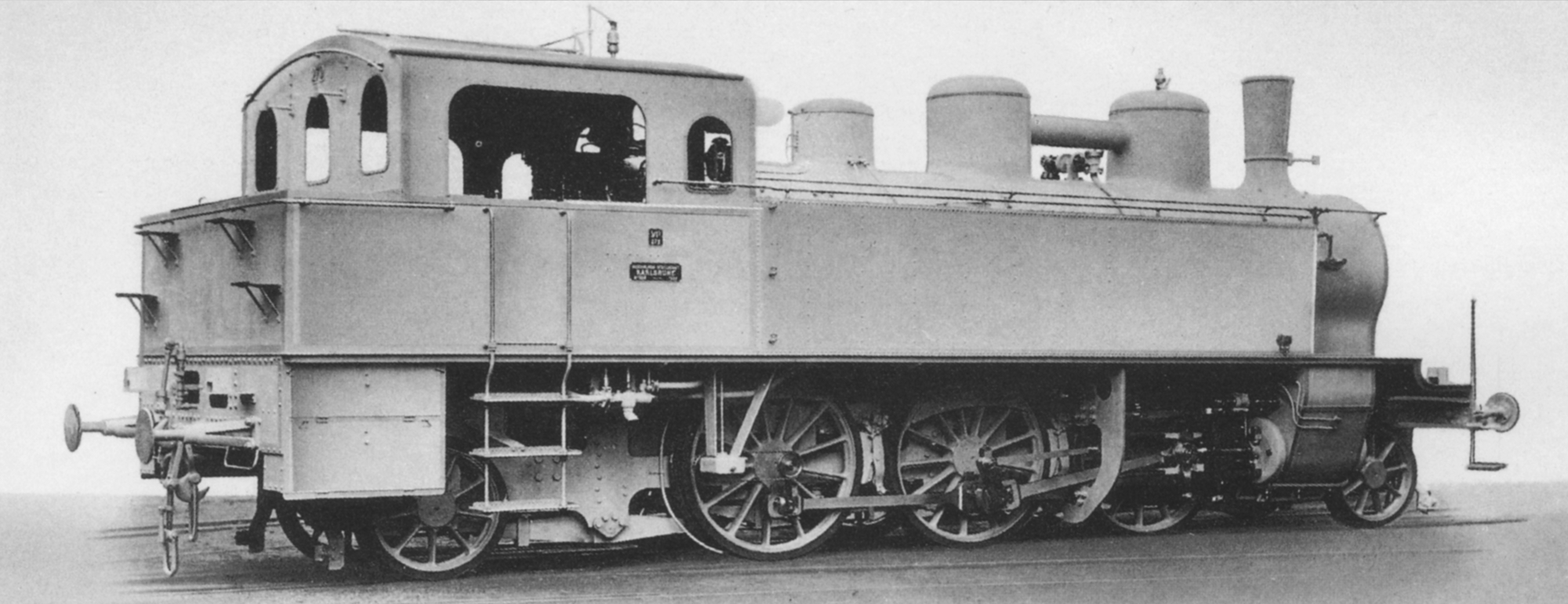
- Baden VIb, No. 279
Type and origin
- Builder: Maffei (15); MBG Karlsruhe (158)
- Build date: 1900–1923
- Total produced: 173
Specifications
- Configuration
  - Whyte: 2-6-2T
  - German: Pt 35.14
- Gauge: 1,435 mm (4 ft 8 1/2 in)
- Leading dia.: 990 mm (3 ft 3 in)
- Driver dia.: 1,480 mm (4 ft 10 1/4 in)
- Trailing dia.: 990 mm (3 ft 3 in)
- Wheelbase
  - Overall: 8,400 mm (27 ft 6 3/4 in)
- Length
  - Over beams: 11,760 mm (38 ft 7 in)
- Height: 4,150 mm (13 ft 7 3/8 in)
- Axle load: 14.1 t (13.9 long tons; 15.5 short tons)
- Adhesive weight: 42.2–42.3 t (41.5–41.6 long tons; 46.5–46.6 short tons)
- Empty weight: 50.8–52.1 t (50.0–51.3 long tons; 56.0–57.4 short tons)
- Service weight: 64.2–67.3 t (63.2–66.2 long tons; 70.8–74.2 short tons)
- Fuel capacity: 3 t (2.95 long tons; 3.31 short tons) of coal
- Water cap.: 7.0 m^{3} (1,500 imp gal; 1,800 US gal)
- Boiler
- No. of heating tubes: 185–189
- Heating tube length: 4,050 mm (13 ft 3 1/2 in)
- Boiler pressure: 13 kgf/cm^{2} (1.27 MPa; 185 lbf/in^{2})
- Heating surface
  - Firebox: 1.83 m^{2} (19.7 sq ft)
  - Radiative: 8.0–8.7 m^{2} (86–94 sq ft)
  - Tubes: 105.92–108.21 m^{2} (1,140.1–1,164.8 sq ft)
  - Evaporative: 113.91–118.62 m^{2} (1,226.1–1,276.8 sq ft)
- Cylinder size: 435 mm (17 1/8 in)
- Piston stroke: 630 mm (24 13/16 in)
- Valve gear: Walschaerts (Heusinger)
- Loco brake: Westinghouse air brake
Performance figures
- Maximum speed: 80 km/h (50 mph)
Career
- Numbers: G.Bad.St.E.: 4…389, 793–812, 1133–1152, 1193–1214; DRG: 75 101 … 75 302
- Retired: 1933–1965

The Baden VI b was the first German tank locomotive with a 2-6-2 wheel arrangement. It was developed by the firm of Maffei for the Grand Duchy of Baden State Railways in order to provide faster services on the Höllentalbahn. As a result, the first six batches were given a firebox sloping to the rear. One striking feature was also the connecting pipe between the two steam domes.

After the first delivery of 15 examples from Maffei, the remaining batches, 2 to 11, were produced by the Maschinenbau-Gesellschaft Karlsruhe. The Deutsche Reichsbahn took over 164 engines. Between 1935 and 1937, five locomotives were sold to the Kreis Oldenburger Eisenbahn; they returned to the Reichsbahn in August 1941 when the KOE was nationalised, and the locomotives regained their former DRG numbers.

Most of the Reichsbahn fleet survived World War II. The Deutsche Bundesbahn ended up with 117 vehicles. Their retirement from the DB began in 1957 and was completed when 75 299 was withdrawn in 1962. The Deutsche Reichsbahn in East Germany took its engines out of service between 1955 and 1965.

Within this class there were differences between the eleven individual batches in terms of overall length, weight, the height of the boiler axis above the rails and the shape of the water tanks.

None of this class is known to have been preserved.

== See also ==
- Grand Duchy of Baden State Railway
- List of Baden locomotives and railbuses
