= List of Baden locomotives and railbuses =

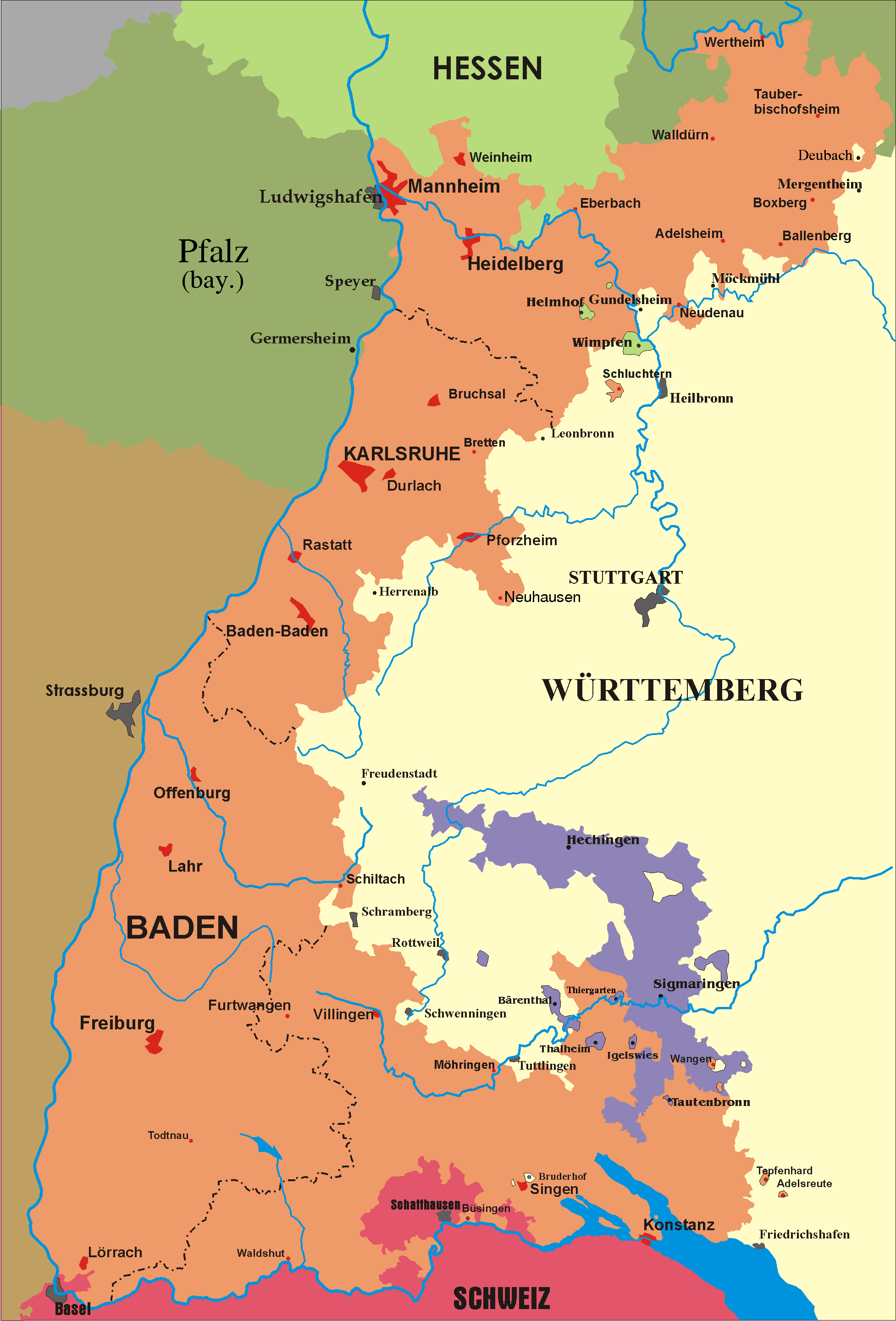
Baden as it stood from 1806 to 1945

This list contains an overview of the locomotives of the Grand Duchy of Baden State Railway (Großherzogliche Baden Staatsbahn), the national railway of the Grand Duchy of Baden, a sovereign state within the German Empire until 1920.

== Classification scheme ==
Flag of the Grand Duchy of Baden 1891-1918

Locomotives in the Grand Duchy of Baden State Railway were organised into classes and were given a railway number as well as names. Their names were derived from the animal kingdom, geographical features (rivers, mountains and towns) as well as people. Because the selection of names became increasingly difficult as more and more vehicles were procured, in 1868 the allocation of names was dropped from locomotive number 218 onwards. In 1882, all name plates were removed.

Railway numbers were issued in sequence. When locomotives were retired, their numbers were allocated to the next locomotives to be delivered. Up to 1882 the name was also adopted. In 1872 an attempt was made to organise the sequence of numbers within locomotive classes. The numbers were swapped around, but locomotives retained the same name. Because there were limits to the practicality of this, it was given up again five years later.

From the 1880s the state railway tried again to organise the railway numbers. Initially shunting locomotives began to be allocated numbers starting at 500. As this threshold was soon reached by the normal vehicle fleet, locomotives were given numbers in the 600s and later in the 1000s.

Unlike other railways, class designations were included from the start. For each new design, a new class number was issued. As a result, classes I to XIV had emerged by 1868.

In 1868 a new system was introduced. This entailed engines with the same features or requirements being grouped together.

Class	Type
I	Light tank locomotives
II	Newer four-coupled express train locomotives
III	Older four-coupled express train locomotives
IV	Passenger train and express train locomotives with the six coupled wheels
V	Older locomotives for mixed traffic trains
VI	Newer passenger train tank locomotives
VII	Goods train locomotives with the six coupled wheels
VIII	Goods train locomotives with eight coupled wheels
IX	Rack railway locomotives
X	Heavy shunting locomotives, crane locomotive

The locomotives previously organised under the old scheme were transferred into the new classes. In order to improve clarity, the old class designations are shown in italics.

Old scheme	New scheme
I a, I b, I c	II a (ex I c); others already retired
II	II b
III a, III b, III c	II b (ex III c); others already retired
IV	II b
V	V b
VI	Already retired
VII	V c
VIII	V c
IX	II a
X a, X b, X c, X d	VI (ex X c); VII a (ex X d); VII b (ex X a, X b)
XI	V a
XII	III
XIII	I a
XIV	IV a

Using the additional lower case letters "a" to "h", the various sub-types within a class were distinguished. In addition, each delivery batch was indicated with a superscript.

Thus the VI b^{10} is the tenth batch of Class VI b passenger train tank locomotives.

== Steam Locomotives ==
The class designations used before 1868 are shown in italics in the following tables for greater clarity.

=== Early Broad Gauge Locomotives for All Traffic Types ===
These locomotives were originally built for the Baden broad gauge of 1,600 mm (5 ft 3 in) and were largely rebuilt on their conversion in 1854 to standard gauge. None of the locomotives were reclassified with Deutsche Reichsbahn running numbers.

Class (old) to 1868	Class new from 1868	Railway number(s)	Quantity	Year(s) of manufacture	Type	Remarks
I a		1–6	6	1839–1843	1A1 n2	3 engines rebuilt to standard gauge, during which they were converted into 1A1 n2t
I b		7–15	9	1842–1843	1A1 n2	All rebuilt to standard gauge, during which no. 15 was converted into 1A1 n2t
II	II b (old)	16–19	4	1843–1844	1A1 n2	All rebuilt to standard gauge, during which they were converted into 2A n2 with jackshafts
III a		20–24	5	1844	1A1 n2	All rebuilt to standard gauge
III b		25–28	4	1844	1A1 n2	All rebuilt to standard gauge
III c	II b (old)	29–36	8	1845	1A1 n2	All rebuilt to standard gauge
IV	II b (old)	37–41	5	1845	1A1 n2	All rebuilt to standard gauge
V	V b	42–46	5	1845	1B n2	All rebuilt to standard gauge, during which they were converted into 1A1 n2 with outside frame
VI		47–54	8	1845	C n2	All rebuilt to standard gauge, during which they were converted into 1B n2 with outside frame
VII	V c	55–58	4	1846	2′B n2	All rebuilt to standard gauge
VIII	V c	59–65	7	1847	1A1 n2	All rebuilt to standard gauge, in 1865 they were converted to 1B n2t
VIII		66	1	1846	1A1 n2	Delivered unusable by Hartmann & Lindt, made operational in 1848 by Kessler; rebuilt to standard gauge

=== Passenger and express train locomotives ===
Class	Railway number(s)	DRG number(s)	Quantity	Year(s) of manufacture	Type	Remarks
II a (old) to 1868: IX	67–68		2	1854	2A n2	Boilers originally had fire tubes that doubled back and a chimney in the centre
II a (old) to 1868: IX	69–76		8	1854–1856	2′A n2	
II a (old) to 1868: IX	7–14, 83–90		16	1858–1863	2A n2	
II a (old) to 1868: I c	1, 2, 4		3	1856	2A n2	Replacements for Class I a
II a	41...90, 452–463, 482–487		24	1888–1890	2′B n2	
II b	39...114		10	1891	2′B n2	
II c	518–537, 572–574, 652–663		35	1892–1900	2′B n2	
II d	733–750		18	1902–1905	2′B1′ n4v	
III to 1868: XII	4...28, 99–112, 127–132, 141–149		41	1861–1865	2′B n2	Some rebuilt to III b
III a	15...74, 230–236, 271–285, 356–362		49	1869–1875	2′B n2	Originally with the III classified; Some rebuilt to III b, the rest reclassified as III a
III b			(ca. 70)	(1881–1897)	2′B n2	Rebuilt from III/III a
IV a to 1868: XIV	37...59, 176–199, 237–246		46	1866–1870	B n2	All rebuilt in 1880–1886 to B1′ n2t with replacement boiler
IV b	324–343		20	1873–1874	1B n2	All rebuilt in 1888–1892 to 1′B1′ n2t with replacement boiler
IV c	1...133, 362–381, 387–393, 422, 423		59	1875–1887	1′B n2	
IV e	18...356, 552–556, 575–595, 622–628, 664–690	38 7001–7007, 38 7021–7025, 38 7031–7034, 38 7041–7046, 38 7061–7073	83	1894–1900	2′C n4v	
IV f	751–765, 833–852	18 201, 18 211–217, 18 231–238, 18 251–256	35	1907–1913	2′C1′ h4v	
IV g	828–832		5	1912	1′C1′ n4v	with Clench steam dryer
IV h	49, 64, 95, 1000–1016	18 301–303, 18 311–319, 18 321–328	20	1918–1920	2′C1′ h4v	
V a to 1868: XI	91–98, 113–126		22	1860–1863	1B n2	One engine rebuilt in 1875 to 1B n2t
VI to 1868: X c	47–52, 150–161, 218–229		30	1864–1869	C n2	
P 8	1153–1192	38 3793–3832	40	1922	2′C h2	Same as Prussian P 8

=== Goods train locomotives ===
Class	Railway number(s)	DRG number(s)	Quantity	Year(s) of manufacture	Type	Remarks
VII a to 1868: X d	77–79, 162–173, 200–215, 247–270, 286–323, 394–401, 404–435, 464–477, 488–511	53 8501–8503, 53 8508–8512, 53 8514–8523, 53 8525–8528, 53 8534, 53 8539–8542, 53 8550–8552, 53 8556–8565, 53 8580–8586	171	1866–1891	C n2	
VII b to 1868: X a	77–82		6	1855–1856	C n2	
VII b to 1868: X b	133–140		8	1863	C n2	
VII c	512–515	53 8587, 53 8597–8598	4	1891	C n2	
VII d	24...357, 516–517, 557–571, 596–621, 635–649, 703–732		109	1893–1902	C n2v	
VIII a	344–355		12	1875	D n2	
VIII b	56...242		10	1886–1888	D n2	purchased from Sharp, Stewart & Co. from the bankruptcy assets of the Swedish-Norwegian Railway, in service 1892–1894; design identical to the Palatine G 3
VIII c	518–519, 538–549, 629–634, 691–702		32	1893–1900	B′B n4v	Articulated Mallet locomotive
VIII e	9...370, 771–780, 813–827	56 701–709, 56 711–738	39	1908–1912	1′D n4v	With Clench steam dryer
VIII e	3...390, 853–866	56 751–776, 56 781–785	31	1913–1915	1′D h4v	
G 12	972–996, 1017–1081, 1125–1132	58 201–225, 58 231–272, 58 281–303, 58 311–318	98	1918–1921	1′E h3	Same as Prussian G 12, 1037–1046 purchased as new by the Prussian state railways

=== Tank locomotives ===
Class	Railway number(s)	DRG number(s)	Quantity	Year(s) of manufacture	Type	Remarks
I a to 1868: XIII	174–175		2	1866	B n2t	For the state-operated private railway Dinglingen–Lahr
I b	402–403	88 7501–7502	2	1874	B n2t	Pontoon locomotives, 402–403 taken over from the Palatinate Railway in 1879 (ex-Palatine VII and VIII)
I b	240	88 7503	1	1893	B n2t	Pontoon locomotives, 402–403 taken over from the Palatinate Railway in 1879 (ex-Palatine VII and VIII)
I c	60, 63, 65		3	1880	1B n2t	
I d	62, 436–437		3	1882–1885	1A n2t	
I e	99...245, 443–449, 478–481	88 7511–7515, 88 7521–7522, 88 7531–7532, 88 7541–7548, 88 7551–7555, 88 7561–7563	30	1887–1893	B n2t	
I f	339		1	1899	B n2t	Taken over in 1904 with Rheinau-Hafen Mannheim
I g	1...485, 845–899	70 101–105, 70 111–125	20	1914–1916	1B h2t	
I g		70 126–133	8	1927–1928	1B h2t	DRG copy
IV d	124...246		14	1891	1′B1′ n2t	
V b	3, 61, 64, 382–386		8	1876–1877	1B n2t	
VI a	358–359		2	1900	1′C n2t	
VI b	4...389, 793–812	75 101–114, 75 121–136, 75 141–161, 75 171–179, 75 181–195, 75 201–216, 75 221–233, 75 241–258	131	1900–1908	1′C1′ n2t	
VI b	1133–1152, 1193–1214	75 261–302	42	1921–1923	1′C1′ n2t	Follow-on order
VI c	875–894, 900–971	75 401–409, 75 411–441, 75 451–464, 75 471–473, 75 481–483, 75 491–494	92	1914–1918	1′C1′ h2t	
VI c	1082–1124	75 1001–1023, 75 1101–1120	43	1920–1921	1′C1′ h2t	Follow-on order
VIII d	650–651		2	1900	BB n2t	Hagans drive
IX a	438–442, 450–451	89 8301–8302	7	1887–1888	C n2(4)t	Rack railway locomotive for the Höllentalbahn, cogwheel drive removed in 1910
IX b	344–345, 371, 736	97 201–204	4	1910	C1′ n2(4v)t	Rack railway locomotive for Höllentalbahn
IX b	737–739	97 251–253	3	1921	C1′ n2(4v)t	Follow-on order
X	149		1	1895	B n2t	Crane locomotive, retired again in 1898
X a	324...422		6	1898–1901	C n2t	Taken over in 1904 with Rheinau-Hafen Mannheim
X b	11...651, 867–874, 997–999	92 201–232, 92 241–251, 92 261–266, 92 271, 92 281–290	68	1907–1919	D n2t	
X b	8...726	92 291–320	30	1921	D n2t	Follow-on order

=== Narrow gauge locomotives ===
Class	Railway number(s)	DRG number(s)	Quantity	Year(s) of manufacture	Type	Remarks
—	1–4	99 7201–7204	4	1904	C n2t	For Mosbach–Mudau, operated by the DEBG under the direction of the Baden State Railway.

Baden narrow gauge locomotives were built for metre gauge.

== Electric locomotives ==
Baden's electric locomotives were for the Wiesental and Wehratal railways, electrified on 13 September 1913.

Class	Railway number(s)	DRG number(s)	Quantity	Year(s) of manufacture	Type	Remarks
A^{1}	1		1	1910	1′C1′ w2u	
A^{2}	1–9	E 61 01–03, 05–09, E 61 14	9	1911–1912	1′C1′ w2u	
A^{3}	1–2	E 61 21–22	2	1912–1913	1′C1′ w2k	

== Railcars ==
Baden railcars were included in the register of passenger coaches and luggage vans, that were also grouped into classes.

Class	Railway number(s)	DRG number(s)	Quantity	Year(s) of manufacture	Type	Remarks
133c	6606		1	1902	A1 n2	Steam railcar, Serpollet type
121a	1000–1007	dT 1–8	8	1914–1915	A1 h2	Steam railcar, Kittel type
133d	6607		1	1903	(A1)(1A) g2t	Battery railcar

== See also ==
- Grand Duchy of Baden
- Grand Duchy of Baden State Railway
- UIC classification
