= Baden I b (old) =

Class of 9 German 2-2-2 locomotives

Type and origin
- Builder: Keßler & Martiensen
- Build date: 1842–1843
- Total produced: 9
Specifications
- Configuration
  - Whyte: 2-2-2
- Gauge: New: 1,600 mm (5 ft 3 in); from 1854 1,435 mm (4 ft 8 1/2 in)
- Coupled dia.: 1,680 mm (5 ft 6 1/8 in)
- Carrying wheel diameter: 1,070 mm (42 in)
- Wheelbase
  - Overall: 3,354 mm (11 ft 0 in)
- Length
  - Over beams: 10,932 mm (35 ft 10 1/2 in)
- Height: 4,070 mm (13 ft 4 1/4 in)
- Empty weight: 14.6 t (14.4 long tons; 16.1 short tons)
- Boiler
  - Model: Sharp type
- No. of heating tubes: 99
- Heating tube length: 2,529 mm (8 ft 3 1/2 in)
- Boiler pressure: 4.5 kgf/cm^{2} (441 kPa; 64.0 lbf/in^{2})
- Heating surface
  - Firebox: New: 0.91 m^{2} (9.8 sq ft); Rebuild: 0.81 m^{2} (8.7 sq ft)
  - Radiative: New: 5.01 m^{2} (53.9 sq ft); Rebuild: 4.62 m^{2} (49.7 sq ft)
  - Tubes: 37.44 m^{2} (403.0 sq ft)
  - Evaporative: New: 42.45 m^{2} (456.9 sq ft); Rebuild: 42.06 m^{2} (452.7 sq ft)
- Cylinders: 2
- Cylinder size: 330 mm (13 in)
- Piston stroke: 457 mm (18 in)
- Valve gear: Gabel; from 1854: Capry and Stephenson
Performance figures
- Maximum speed: 85 km/h (53 mph)
Career
- Retired: 1867

Baden I b (old) "Expansion"
Type and origin
- Total produced: 1
Specifications
- Wheelbase
  - Overall: 3,354 mm (11 ft 0 in)
- Length
  - Over beams: 11,640 mm (38 ft 2 1/4 in)
- Height: 4,400 mm (14 ft 5 1/4 in)
- Empty weight: New: 15.0 t (14.8 long tons; 16.5 short tons); Rebuild: 17.0 t (16.7 long tons; 18.7 short tons)
- Service weight: New: 16.6 t (16.3 long tons; 18.3 short tons); Rebuild: 21.6 t (21.3 long tons; 23.8 short tons)
- Water cap.: 5.4 m^{3} (1,200 imp gal; 1,400 US gal)
- Boiler
- No. of heating tubes: 101
- Heating tube length: 2,529 mm (8 ft 3 1/2 in)
- Boiler pressure: 5 kgf/cm^{2} (490 kPa; 71.1 lbf/in^{2})
- Heating surface
  - Radiative: New: 5.00 m^{2} (53.8 sq ft); Rebuild: 4.61 m^{2} (49.6 sq ft)
  - Tubes: 38.20 m^{2} (411.2 sq ft)
  - Evaporative: New: 43.20 m^{2} (465.0 sq ft); Rebuild: 42.81 m^{2} (460.8 sq ft)
- Cylinder size: 381 mm (1 ft 3 in)
- Valve gear: Meyer
- technical data given where different

The engines of Baden Class I b were very early German steam locomotives built for the Grand Duchy of Baden State Railways.

== History ==
The Class I b locomotives were copies of the first six Baden machines, the Class I a. The Badenia built by Emil Kessler in 1841 was the first locomotive to be built in Baden and the first of nine engines of its class. Kessler built this engine together with his partner Martiensen at his own expense and then placed it experimentally in service. Because it achieved the same level of performance as its English prototypes, it was taken over by the state railway.

On the line between Heidelberg und Wiesloch one locomotive achieved a speed of 54 km/h (34 mph) with 20 wagons. On a fast run the engines could manage 85 km/h (53 mph).

The majority of the engines were retired by 1863. Only the last one was converted in 1854 into a tank locomotive and stayed in service until 1867. It had a water capacity of 1,450 L (320 imp gal; 380 US gal) and coal capacity of 1.8 t (1.77 long tons; 1.98 short tons).

== Technical description ==
The locomotives had the same piston stroke as their English counterparts and were also equipped with a fork valve gear (Gabelsteuerung). The locomotive OFFENBURG had a Capry valve gear on delivery. The engines had improved running gear however due to their adjustable leaf springs and centre axle box. The last engine of this class, EXPANSION No. 15, had a Meyer double rocker (Doppelschwing) valve gear, a larger cylinder bore of 381 mm, higher boiler pressure of 5.0 bar and 101 heating tubes. Its larger heating area generated an increase in power.

The locomotives were originally built for 1,600 mm (5 ft 3 in) broad gauge, but converted in 1854 to standard gauge. At the same time they were given Capry valve gear, apart from CARLSRUHE and PHOENIX which were fitted with Stephenson valve gear.

The engines had a Sharp boiler barrel. The vertical boiler had a rounded top. On the foremost boiler section was the steam dome with a safety valve and spring balances. The frame comprised two outside stiffener frame sections (Futterrahmen) and four plate frame sections (Plattenrahmen) for the steam engine. The EXPANSION had two plate frame sections.

The vehicles were equipped with a Kessler type tender of class 2 T 5.4 or 3 T 5.4.

== See also ==
- Grand Duchy of Baden State Railways
- List of Baden locomotives and railbuses

== Sources ==
- Hermann Lohr, Georg Thielmann: Lokomotiv-Archiv Baden. transpress, Berlin 1988, ISBN 3-344-00210-4
- Lohr, Hermann; Thielmann, Georg (1988). Lokomotiven badischer Eisenbahnen (EFA 2.7) (in German). Düsseldorf: Alba. pp. 48–50, 178. ISBN 3-87094-118-9.
