= Emil Kessler =

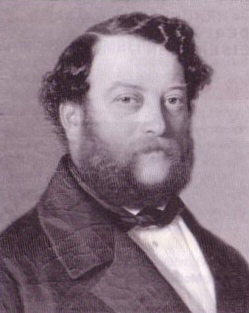
Emil Kessler

Emil Julius Carl Kessler (20 August 1813 – 16 March 1867) was a German businessman and founder of the Maschinenfabrik Esslingen ('Esslingen Engineering Works').

== Biography ==
Kessler was born in Baden-Baden, attended school there and later studied constructional and mechanical engineering in Karlsruhe. In 1837 he founded an engineering works with Theodor Martiensen in Karlsruhe, where tools, small machines and railway equipment were manufactured. In 1840/1841 the Royal Württemberg Railway Commission tendered for railway construction and the production of rolling stock to pave the way for the Royal Württemberg State Railways (Königlich Württembergische Staats-Eisenbahnen). Kessler's bid was successful and in 1841 he built his first steam locomotive, the Badenia for the Grand Duchy of Baden State Railway (Großherzoglich Badische Staatsbahn).

From 1842 Kessler was the sole owner of the new firm Kesslers Maschinenfabrik ('Kessler's Engineering Works'). In 1848 it was converted into a public limited company, but liquidated on 30 October 1851 and acquired in 1852 by the Baden government. One year later he founded a new company under the name of Maschinenbau-Gesellschaft Karlsruhe ('Karlsruhe Engineering Works'), that again took up locomotive building and delivered its first engine in 1854. Because Württemberg also wanted to have its own production facility for the emerging railways, Emil Kessler founded the Maschinenfabrik Esslingen that delivered its first engine in 1847.

Emil Kessler died on 16 March 1867 in Esslingen am Neckar from a heart attack.

== Literature ==
- Max Mayer: "Lokomotiven, Wagen und Bergbahnen - Geschichtliche Entwicklung in der Maschinenfabrik Eßlingen seit dem Jahre 1846", VDI-Verlag G.M.B.H. Berlin SW 19, 1924
- Ludwig Keßler: "Aus den Anfängen der Maschinenfabrik Eßlingen. Emil Keßler, sein Leben sein Werk". Erinnerungsschrift zur 125. Wiederkehr des Geburtstags von Emil Keßler, 1938
