= Bavarian D VI =

Bavarian D VI DRG Class 98.75
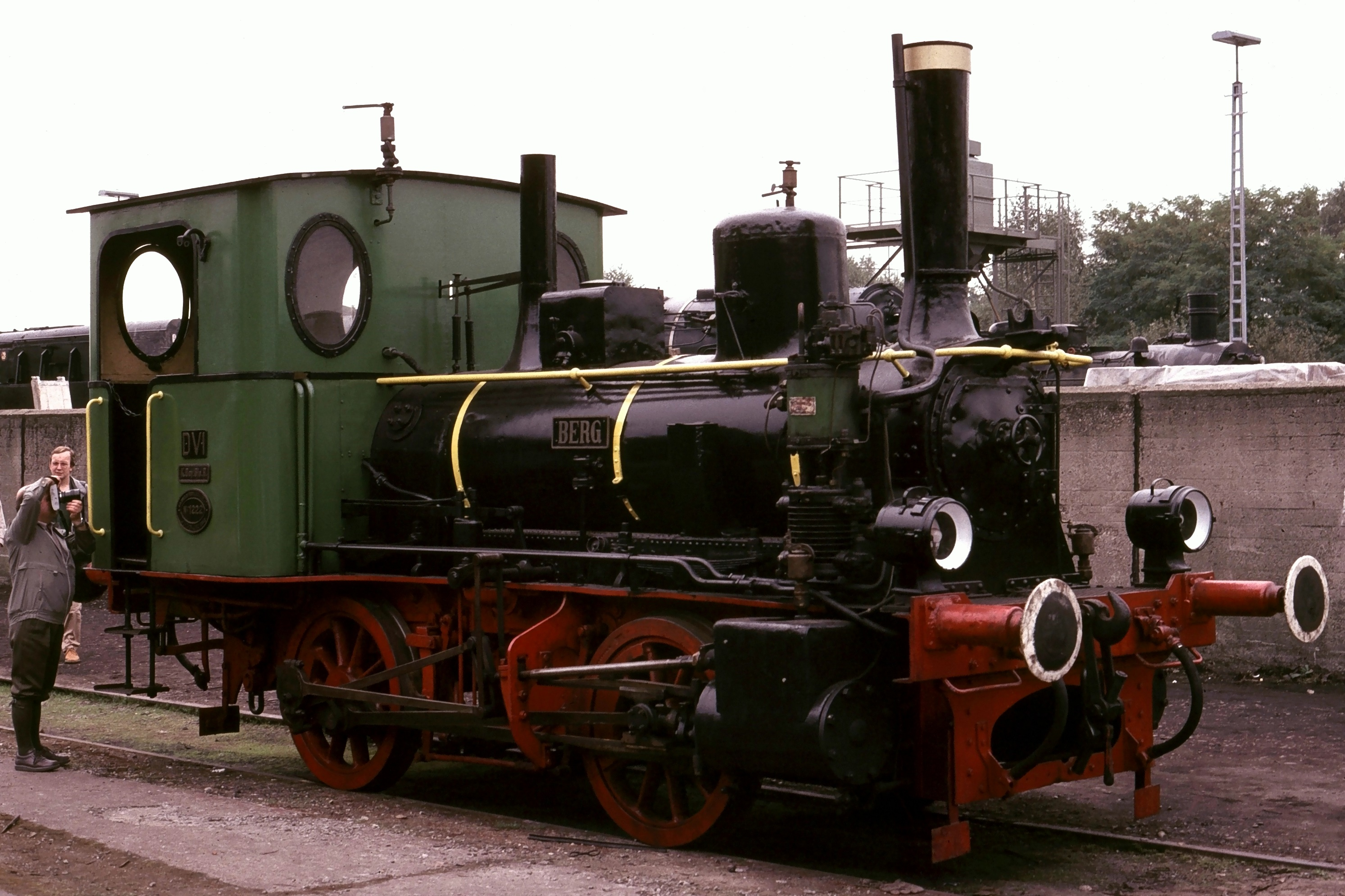
- No. 83 BERG on 5 October 1985 in Bochum-Dahlhausen
Type and origin
- Builder: Maffei (30); Krauss (23)
- Build date: 1880–1894
- Total produced: 53
Specifications
- Configuration
  - Whyte: 0-4-0T
  - German: L 22.9
- Gauge: 1,435 mm (4 ft 8 1/2 in)
- Driver dia.: 1,006 mm (3 ft 3 5/8 in)
- Length
  - Over beams: 6,860 or 6,910 mm (22 ft 6 in or 22 ft 8 in)
- Axle load: 9.3 or 9.8 t (9.2 or 9.6 long tons; 10.3 or 10.8 short tons)
- Adhesive weight: 18.5 or 19.6 t (18.2 or 19.3 long tons; 20.4 or 21.6 short tons)
- Service weight: 18.5 or 19.6 t (18.2 or 19.3 long tons; 20.4 or 21.6 short tons)
- Fuel capacity: 500 or 800 kg (1,100 or 1,800 lb) coal
- Water cap.: 1.8 or 2.3 m^{3} (400 or 510 imp gal; 480 or 610 US gal)
- Boiler pressure: 12 kgf/cm^{2} (1,180 kPa; 171 lbf/in^{2})
- Heating surface
  - Firebox: 0.75 m^{2} (8.1 sq ft)
  - Evaporative: 25.71 or 28.50 m^{2} (276.7 or 306.8 sq ft)
- Cylinders: 2
- Cylinder size: 266 mm (10 1/2 in)
- Piston stroke: 508 mm (20 in)
Performance figures
- Maximum speed: 45 km/h (28 mph)
Career
- Numbers: K.Bay.Sts.E.: 38…974, 1801–1804; DRG: 98 7501 – 98 7526
- Retired: 1964

The Bavarian Class D VI were German, 0-4-0, steam locomotives of the Royal Bavarian State Railways (Königlich Bayerische Staatsbahn). They were light, twin-coupled, saturated steam, tank engines. Maffei supplied the first 30 locomotives from 1880 to 1883, and Krauss delivered a further 23 up to 1894.

== History ==
The Class D VI locomotives were procured for branch lines in flat terrain and had a maximum permitted axle load of 12 tons.

The first 44 locomotives had no side tanks. Water was stored in a well tank, and coal in the driver's cab. The last nine locomotives, on the other hand, had short tanks on either side, in front of the driver's cab. That increased water capacity from 1.8 to 2.3 m^{2} and coal capacity from 0.5 to 0.8 t.

In the 1920s, several D VI's were on duty in the Palatinate (Pfalz) as pontoon locomotives at Speyer and Maximiliansau.

In 1925 the Deutsche Reichsbahn-Gesellschaft took over 26 vehicles as DRG Class 98.75 (Baureihe 98.75), five of which had side tanks. They were retired by the end of the 1920s and some were sold on as industrial locomotives.

The final duties of former locomotive number 83, Berg (98 7508), delivered by Krauss in 1883, were in a peat factory in Raubling, where it was not taken out of service until 1964. This locomotive is the only surviving example of its class and is in the care of the German Railway History Company (Deutsche Gesellschaft für Eisenbahngeschichte e. V. or DGEG).

== Technical features ==
The Class D VI was manufactured with a riveted plate frame that also acted as the water tank.

The boiler was a riveted two-piece construction; the firebox, with its square cross-section, was arranged between the sole bars. Two injectors fed the boiler.

The outside, twin-cylinder, saturated steam engine was furnished with a Stephenson valve gear; the second axle was the driving axle.

For the first time on Bavarian locomotives, running plates and Hardy vacuum brakes were installed on these saturated-steam engines. Several examples had gangways as well. An unusual feature was the location of the sandbox under the running plate between the coupled axles. They had slide valves on top and outside Stephenson link motion.

== See also ==
- Royal Bavarian State Railways
- List of Bavarian locomotives and railbuses
