= Maschinenbau-Gesellschaft Karlsruhe =

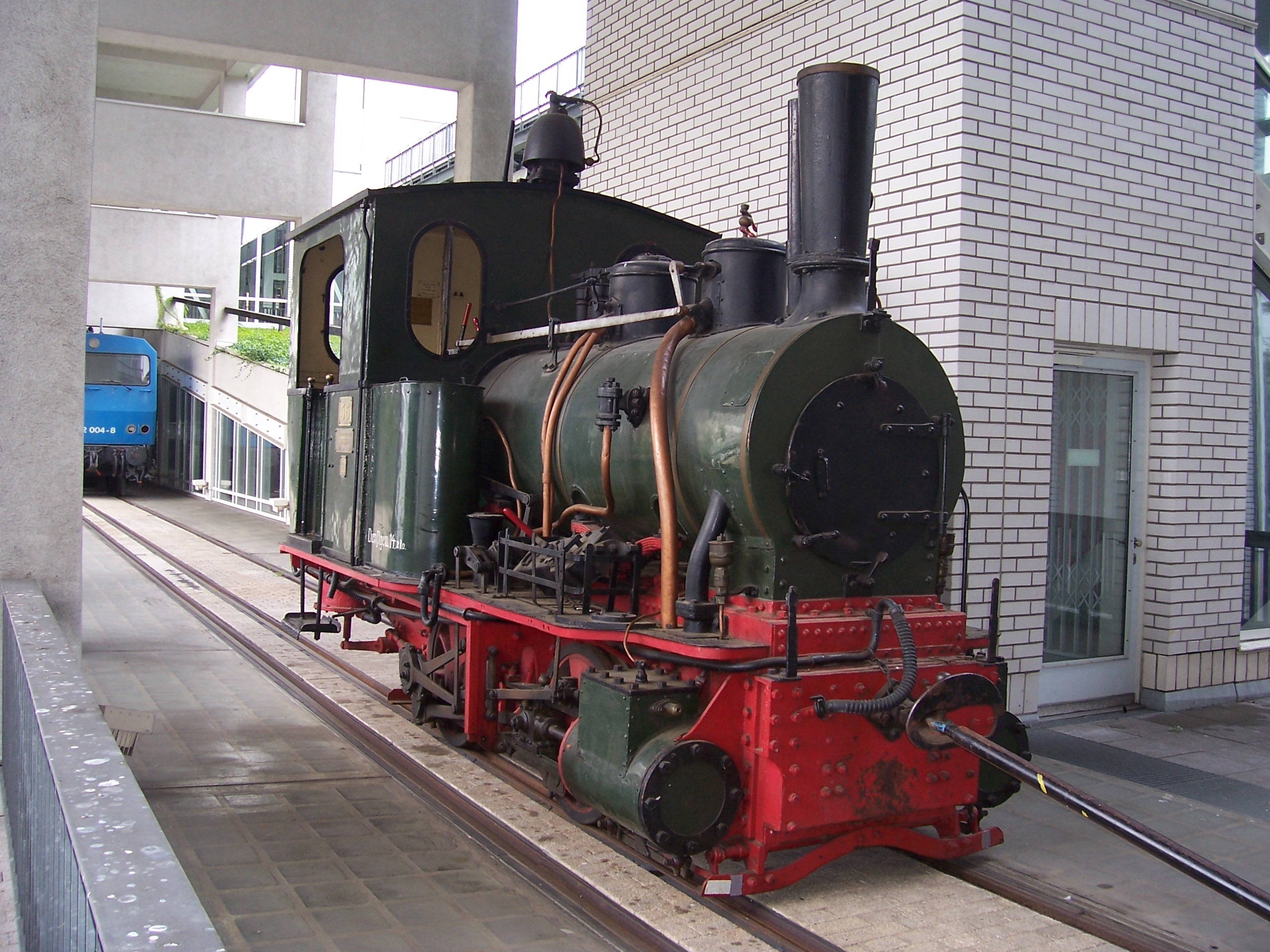
OEG locomotive no. 56 in the Technoseum, Mannheim

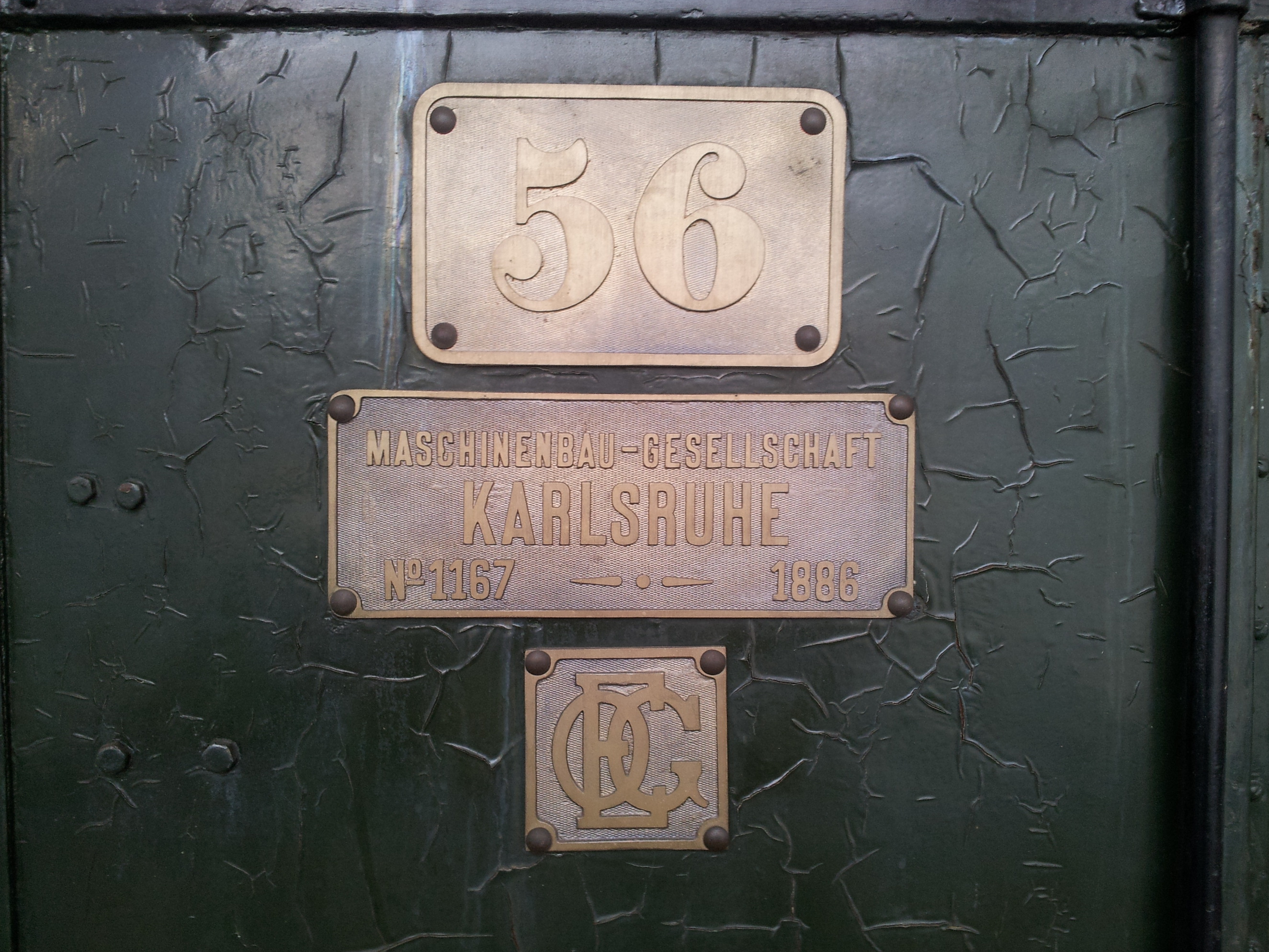
OEG locomotive no. 56, works no. 1167

The Maschinenbau-Gesellschaft Karlsruhe ('Karlsruhe Engineering Works') was a locomotive and railway wagon manufacturer in the early days of the German railways. It was based at Karlsruhe in what is now the state of Baden-Württemberg in southwestern Germany.

== History ==
The origins of the firm go back to an engineering works founded in Karlsruhe in 1837 by Emil Kessler and Theodor Martiensen. In 1842, the first steam locomotive, Badenia, was delivered to the Baden state railways. After a financial crisis resulting from the collapse of the bank funding the company, Kessler's engineering works also got into economic difficulties. In 1852 the Maschinenbaugesellschaft Carlsruhe was founded, Emil Kessler left the company and the crisis was overcome.

The Maschinenbaugesellschaft Karlsruhe always belonged to the ranks of those smaller steam locomotive manufacturers that mostly built locomotives under licence which had been designed by other firms. Their major customers were the Baden state railways and, initially, also the Bergisch-Märkische Eisenbahn-Gesellschaft, the Köln-Mindener Eisenbahn-Gesellschaft, the Rheinische Eisenbahn-Gesellschaft and the Royal Hanoverian State Railways.

After a period when the factory was working to full capacity during the course of the First World War, there followed a slump in sales in 1925, because the Deutsche Reichsbahn ordered virtually no more new steam locomotives for several years. Although they produced the first batch of seven DRG Class 86 standard steam locomotives (Einheitsdampflokomotiven) for the Reichsbahn in 1928, that same year locomotive production at the Maschinenbau-Gesellschaft Karlsruhe had to be ceased. Attempts to save the firm by taking on the construction of diesel locomotives were unsuccessful and it went into bankruptcy in 1929. Between 1842 and 1928 a total of 2,370 locomotives had been built in Karlsruhe.

The factory for the engineering works was initially located south of Karlsruhe's city centre at Karlstor. In 1902 it was transferred to a new site at Karlsruhe's western station (Westbahnhof) in Grünwinkel. During the first 30 years of its existence, a number of notable engineers worked for the Karlsruhe locomotive builders, including Emil Kessler, Niklaus Riggenbach, Carl Benz, Gottlieb Daimler and Wilhelm Maybach.

== Literature ==
- Werner Willhaus, Die Geschichte der Maschinenbaugesellschaft Karlsruhe und ihrer Vorgänger. EK-Verlag Freiburg, 2005. ISBN 3-88255-837-7
