= Grand Duchy of Baden State Railway =

Railway in Germany

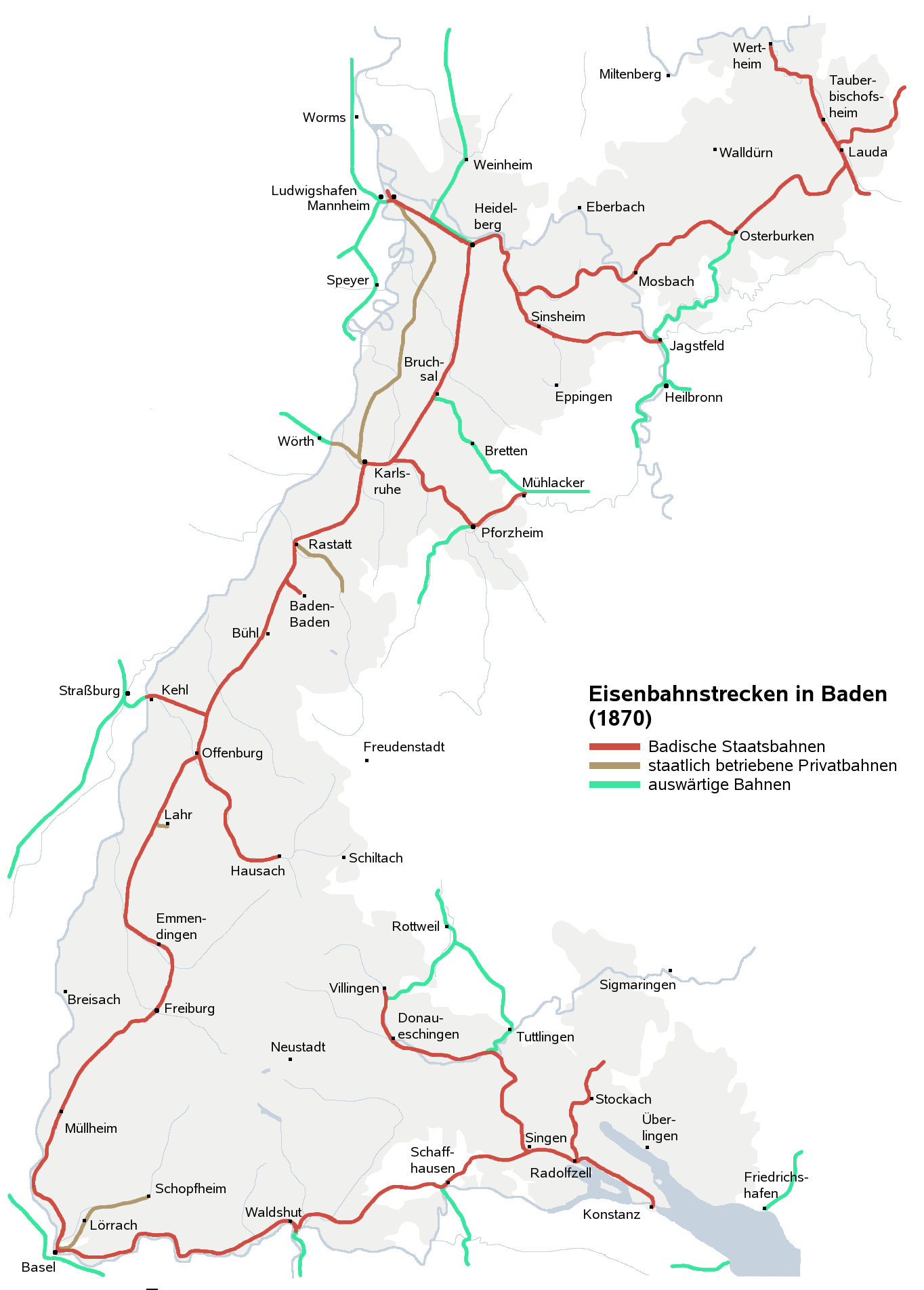
Map of the railway lines in Baden 1870

Grand Duchy of Baden had its own state-owned railway company, the Grand Duchy of Baden State Railways (Großherzoglich Badische Staatseisenbahnen or G.Bad.St.E.), which was founded in 1840. At the time when it was integrated into the Deutsche Reichsbahn in 1920, its network had an overall length of about 2,000 kilometres (1,200 mi).

== History ==
=== Foundation ===
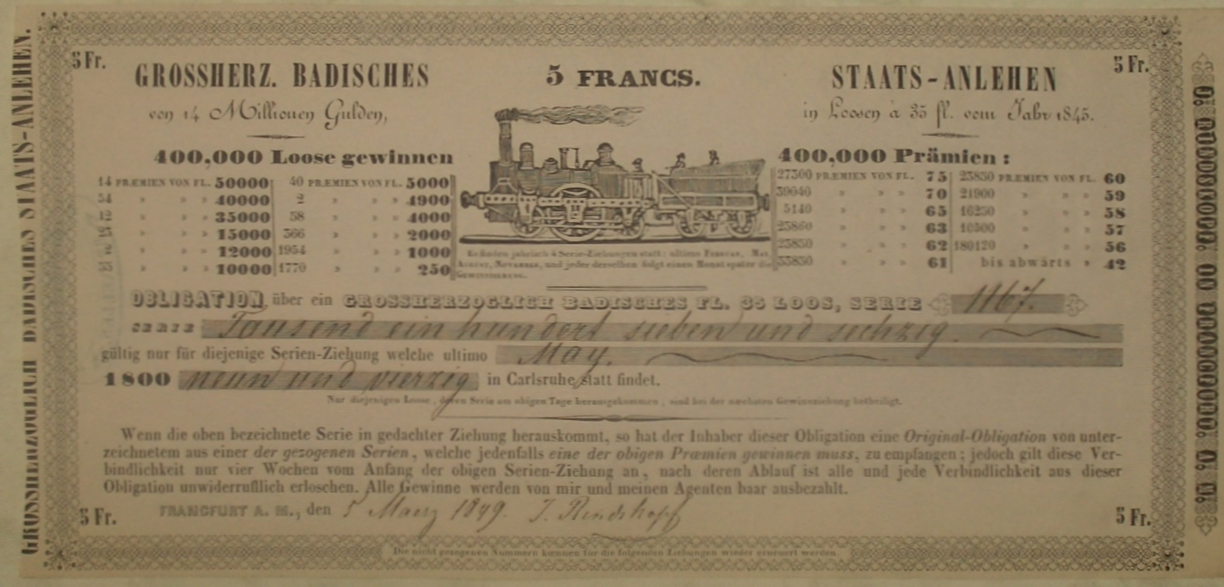
Baden premium bond from 1845/49 issued to finance railway construction.

Baden was the second German state after the Duchy of Brunswick to build and operate railways at state expense. In 1833 a proposal for the construction of a railway from Mannheim to Basel was put forward for the first time by Mannheim businessman, Ludwig Newhouse, but initially received no support from the Baden state government. Other proposals too by, for example Friedrich List, were unsuccessful at first. Not until the foundation of a railway company in the neighbouring French province of Alsace, for the construction of a line from Basel to Strasbourg in 1837, did any serious planning begin for the building of a railway in Baden in order to avoid the loss of trade routes to Alsace. At an extraordinary meeting of the state parliament, the Baden legislature passed three laws on 29 March 1838 for the construction of the first route between Mannheim and the Swiss border at Basel, as well as a stub line to Baden-Baden and a branch to Strasbourg. The construction of the railway line was to be funded by the state, something that had been championed especially by Karl Friedrich Nebenius. In September 1838 work started.

The Ministry of the Interior was responsible for the construction of the railway, setting up for that purpose its own authority, the 'Railway Construction Division'. Later the railway construction authorities were incorporated into the 'Water and Road Construction Division'. Responsibility for the operation of the railway was, by contrast, given to the Foreign Ministry because it took over the running of the Postal Division, that from then on became the 'Post and Railway Division'. Not until the merger of the Baden Post Office into the Reichspost in 1872 did a separate railway administration emerge in Baden: the Grand Duchy of Baden State Railways.

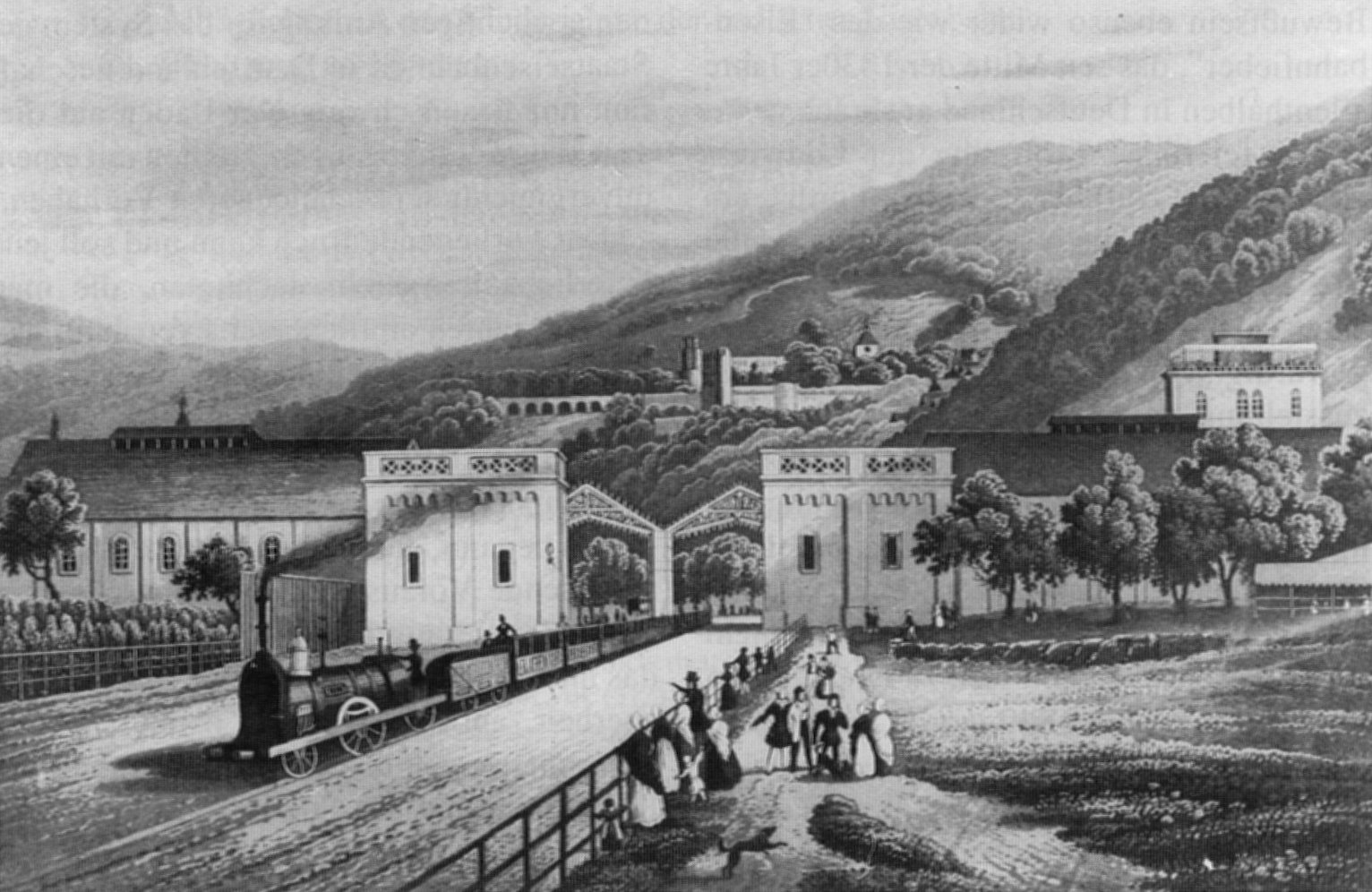
Departure of a train from Heidelberg station, 1840.

=== Development of the main lines ===
The first route, called the Baden Mainline (Badische Hauptbahn), was built in sections between 1840 and 1863. The first, 18.5 km long, section between Mannheim and Heidelberg was taken into service on 12 September 1840. Other sections followed: to Karlsruhe in 1843, Offenburg in 1844, Freiburg im Breisgau in 1845, Schliengen in 1847, Efringen-Kirchen in 1848 and Haltingen in 1851. The branches to Kehl and Baden-Baden were opened as early as 1844 and 1845 respectively. The extension of the main line through Basel territory required negotiations with the Swiss Confederation, during which differences of opinion over the best place for the junction of the Baden line to the Swiss network – Basel or Waldshut – led to delays.

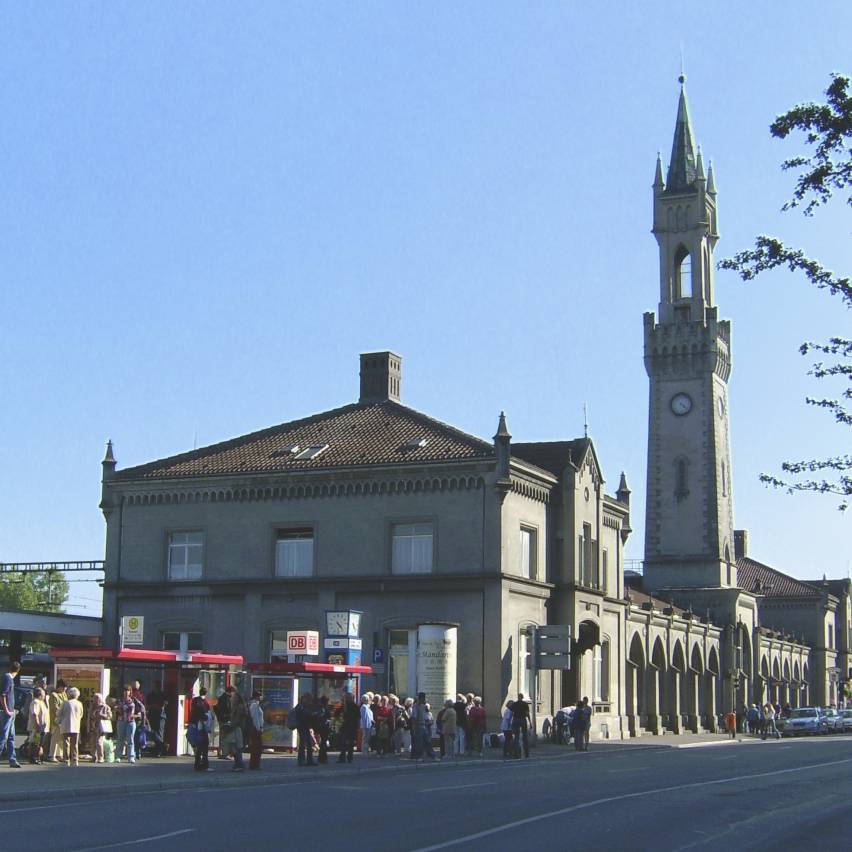
Konstanz station still has today a slim clock tower typical of former Baden stations.

In the state treaty of 27 July 1852 an accommodation was reached which enabled the construction and operation of a line on Swiss sovereign territory by the Baden State Railways.

The Baden railway lines were initially laid to the 1,600 mm (5 ft 3 in). After it turned out that all her neighbouring states had opted for 1,435 mm (4 ft 8 1/2 in) standard gauge rail, the Baden State Railways rebuilt all their existing routes and rolling stock to standard gauge within just one year during 1854/55.

The line reached Basel in 1855, Waldshut in 1856 and Konstanz in 1863. With that the 414.3 km long Baden main line was completed. After the all-important north–south axis as well as links to the Lake Constance region had been established by the Baden Mainline, the remaining network expansion plans concentrated on opening up the area of Pforzheim with the Karlsruhe–Pforzheim–Mühlacker route (opened 1859–1863), linking up the Odenwald and Tauberfrankens with the Baden Odenwald Railway (Heidelberg–Mosbach–Würzburg, opened 1862–1866) and forging a direct link from Karlsruhe to Konstanz, without the diversion via Basel, in the shape of the Black Forest Railway (opened 1866–1873).

=== Links to neighbouring states ===
Even when the Baden Mainline was being built, plans were already being formulated to link up with the Swiss railway network. This was not achieved until the bridge at Waldshut over the river Rhine, built by Robert Gerwig, was completed on 18 August 1859. Other links were made in 1863 at Schaffhausen, in 1871 at Konstanz and in 1875 at Singen. The Basel link line, which connected Baden station on the east of the Rhine with the Central station west of the Rhine, was opened in 1873. Today it is the most important railway connexion between Germany and Switzerland.

The connexion to the north towards Weinheim-Darmstadt–Frankfurt had been established since 1846 by the Main-Neckar Line, in which the Grand Duchy of Baden participated. In 1879 the Ried Railway (Riedbahn) followed, although Baden did not own any section of it.

From 1861 there had also been a direct route to France after the completion of the Rhine bridge between Kehl and Strasbourg. The opening up of the Palatinate (Pfalz) was first realised in 1865 with a pontoon bridge from Karlsruhe–Maxau as well as a link between Mannheim and Ludwigshafen in 1867. A connexion with Bavaria followed the opening of the Baden Odenwald Railway (Baden Odenwaldbahn) in 1866.

Negotiations for a route to Württemberg were particularly difficult because both states were competing for traffic between Germany and the Alpine passes. While Baden favoured a line via Pforzheim, Württemberg was interested in a more direct connexion at Bruchsal. An agreement was finally reached in the state treaty of the 4 December 1850, whereby Württemberg was granted the right to build the direct Stuttgart–Mühlacker–Bretten–Bruchsal route (Württemberg Western Railway) even on Baden territory, while Baden was permitted to build and operate the Karlsruhe–Mühlacker line, which ran partly in Württemberg. The connexion with Bruchsal was taken into service in 1853.

=== Further expansion ===
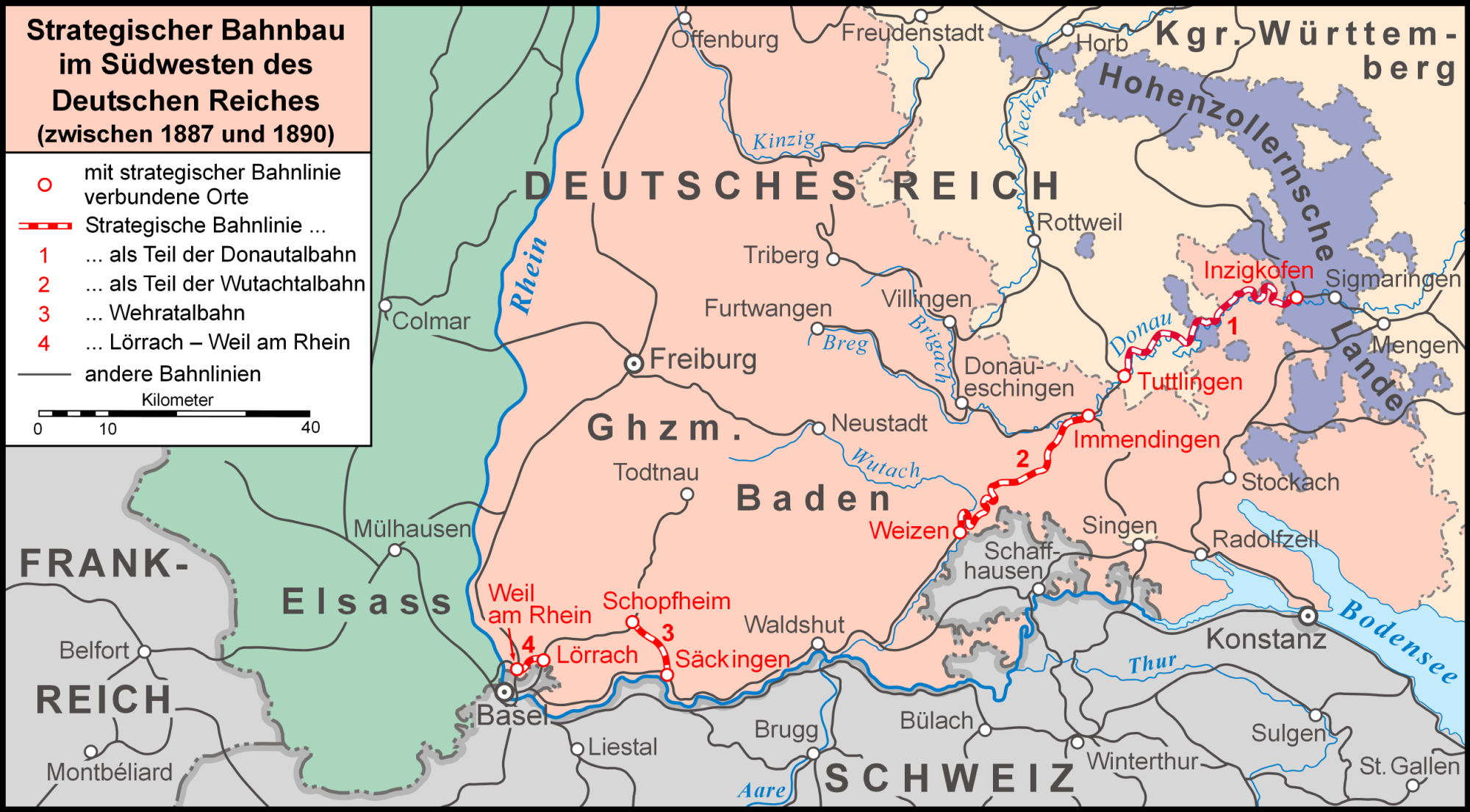
Construction of the strategic railway line in south Baden and the Danube valley between 1887 and 1890

The subsequent expansion of Baden's railway network was either aimed at opening up the regions or carried out from a military perspective. Worth mentioning are:

- The Neckar Valley Railway (Neckartalbahn), Neckargemünd–Eberbach–Jagstfeld, opened in 1879
- The Höllental Railway (Höllentalbahn), Freiburg im Breisgau–Neustadt (Schwarzwald), opened in 1887
- The strategic diversions on the Upper Rhine: Weil am Rhein–Lörrach, Wehra Valley Railway (Wehratalbahn) and the completion of the Wutach Valley Railway (Wutachtalbahn) all between 1887 and 1890
- The strategic Rhine Railway, Mannheim–Graben-Neudorf–Karlsruhe–Rastatt–Roeschwoog (Elsass), opened in 1895

Around 1895, Baden's railway network was more or less finished bar a few small sections. In 1900 it had a track length of 1996 km, of which 1521 km was owned by the State Railways. In the succeeding years the main effort was the expansion of stations which formed railway hubs. The most important conversions were:

- New marshalling yard at Karlsruhe, 1895
- New station at Rastatt, 1895
- New goods relief line at Freiburg im Breisgau, 1905
- New goods station at Basel, 1905
- New goods relief line at Bruchsal, 1906
- New marshalling yard in Mannheim, 1906–1907
- New station at Offenburg with a marshalling yard, 1911
- New Baden station in Basel with new adjoining marshalling yard to the north at Weil am Rhein, 1913
- New central station at Karlsruhe, 1913
- New marshalling yard and goods station at Heidelberg, 1914

The newly built Heidelberg central station could not be completed due to the start of the First World War. Its completion had to be delayed until 1955.

=== State-run private railways ===
Several routes in Baden were built by private concerns, but operated by the State Railways and, in most cases, subsequently taken over. These were not just branch lines of purely local significance like the Wiese Valley Railway (Wiesentalbahn) (Basel–Schopfheim–Zell im Wiesental), opened in 1862, but also main lines. In addition to attempts by towns, that still had no railway connexion and wanted better access to the railway network, the large cities in the state also got involved in railway line construction, in order to open up their environs and to strengthen their position as transport hubs. For example, the city of Mannheim built a direct railway line to Karlsruhe without having to go via Heidelberg, in order to step out of the shadows into which they had fallen when the Badische Haupt Railway was married up at Friedrichsfeld and Heidelberg with the Main-Neckar Line that ran on northwards. In a countermove the city of Heidelberg pressed for the construction of the Heidelberg–Schwetzingen–Speyer route, in order to secure its importance as a transport hub.

The most important of the privately built lines operated by the State Railways were:

- The Maxau Railway (Maxaubahn) at Karlsruhe an den Rhein, built by the city of Karlsruhe, opened in 1862, was the first link between Baden's railways and those of the Palatinate. It was nationalised in 1906.
- The Rhine Railway (Rheinbahn) Mannheim–Schwetzingen–Graben-Neudorf–Eggenstein–Karlsruhe, built by the city of Mannheim, opened in 1870 and taken over by the Baden State Railways on the day it opened.
- The Kraichgau Railway (Kraichgaubahn) Karlsruhe–Bretten–Eppingen with its extension to Heilbronn, built by the city of Karlsruhe, opened in 1879 and taken over by the Baden State Railways on the day it opened.

=== Merger into the Reichsbahn ===
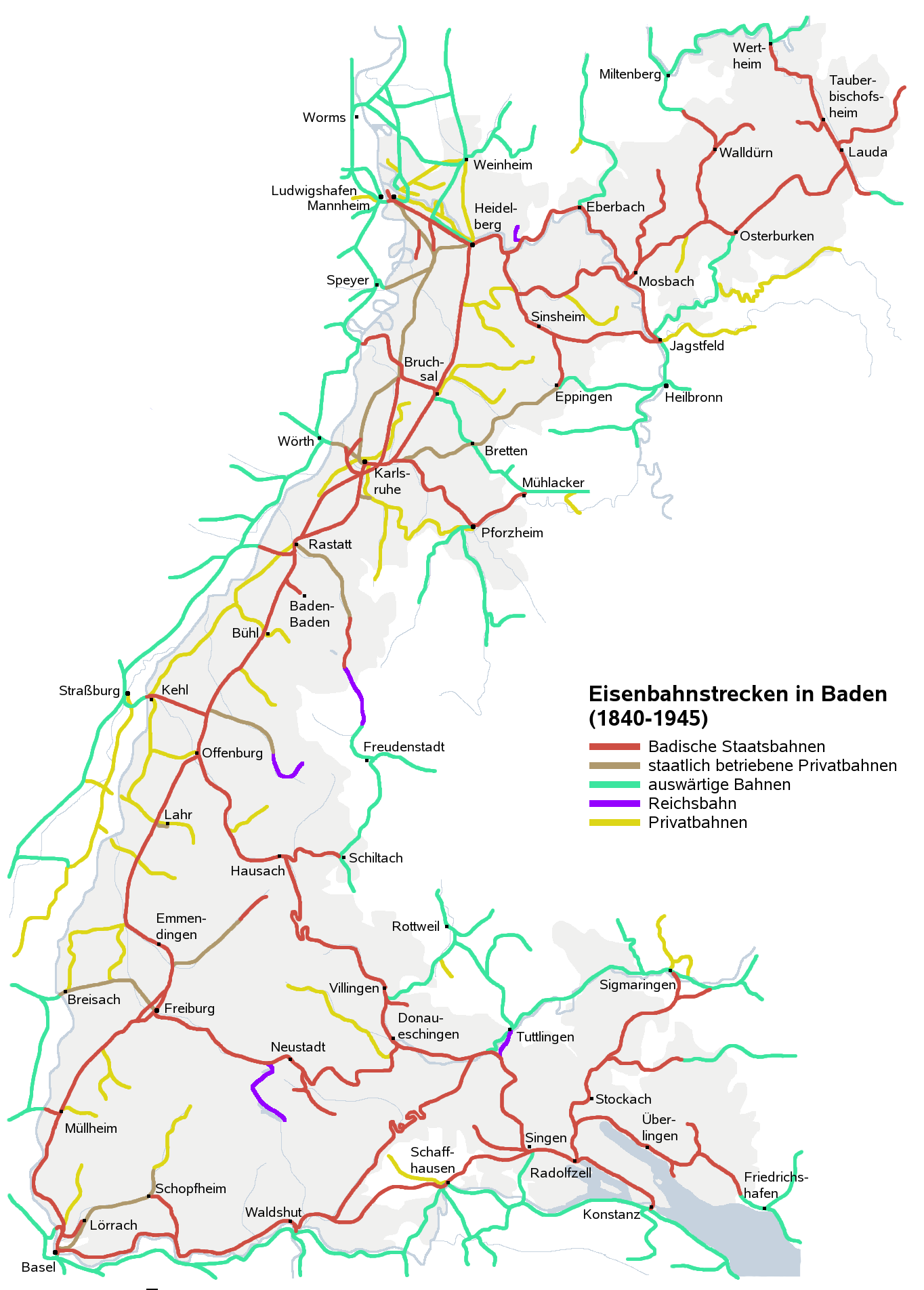
Plan of the railway lines built before 1945 in Baden

On the formation of the Deutsche Reichsbahn on 1 April 1920 the Baden State Railways were merged into it. The head office in Karlsruhe became the Karlsruhe Reichsbahn Division. The foundation of the Reichsbahn meant that a wish list of routes in Baden was cancelled and only four new lines were built:

- The extension of the Rench Valley Railway (Renchtalbahn) to Bad Peterstal in 1926 and Bad Griesbach in 1933
- The Three Lakes Line Titisee–Seebrugg in 1926
- The gap in Murg Valley Railway (Murgtalbahn) in 1928
- The Neckarsteinach–Schönau (Odenwald) stub line in 1928

Construction work on a railway connexion from Bretten to Kürnbach (with a planned junction to the Zabergäu Railway (Zabergäubahn) at Leonbronn) was begun, but the line was never completed.

=== Electric operations ===
The Baden State Railways began electric railway operations on 13 September 1913 with opening of the 15 KV AC, 16 2/3 Hz Wiese Valley Railway, Basel–Zell im Wiesental, and on its Schopfheim–Bad Säckingen branch. In addition to an experimental Class A¹ locomotive, eleven Class A² and A³ (DRG Class E 61) electric locomotives were procured. All had side-rods driving three axles. The electrification of the Wiesen valley line was mainly done in order to trial electric traction; it had no great significance in terms of traffic. No further expansion of electric services was carried out after the First World War due to the serious economic situation and it was not until 1952 that the electrification of Baden's railway network was begun in earnest.

== The network ==
The railway lines in Baden State Railway network were opened as follows:

Section	As part of the route:	Opened on
Mannheim–Heidelberg	Rhine Valley Railway	12 September 1840
Heidelberg–Karlsruhe	Rhine Valley Railway	10 April 1843
Karlsruhe–Ettlingen–Rastatt	Rhine Valley Railway	1 May 1844
Rastatt–Baden-Oos	Rhine Valley Railway	6 May 1844
Baden-Oos–Offenburg	Rhine Valley Railway	1 June 1844
Appenweier–Kehl	Appenweier–Strasbourg railway	1 June 1844
Baden-Oos–Baden-Baden	–	27 July 1845
Offenburg–Freiburg im Breisgau	Rhine Valley Railway	1 August 1845
Freiburg im Breisgau–Müllheim (Baden)	Rhine Valley Railway	1 June 1847
Müllheim (Baden)–Schliengen	Rhine Valley Railway	15 June 1847
Schliengen–Efringen-Kirchen	Rhine Valley Railway	8 November 1848
Efringen-Kirchen–Haltingen	Rhine Valley Railway	22 January 1851
Port line Mannheim	–	9 November 1854
Haltingen–Basel Baden station	Rhine Valley Railway	20 February 1855
Basel Baden station–Bad Säckingen	High Rhine Railway	4 February 1856
Bad Säckingen–Waldshut	High Rhine Railway	30 October 1856
Durlach–Wilferdingen-Singen	Karlsruhe–Mühlacker	10 August 1859
Waldshut–Koblenz ¹	Waldshut–Turgi	18 August 1859
Kehl–Straßburg ¹	Appenweier–Strasbourg railway	11 May 1861
Wilferdingen-Singen–Pforzheim	Karlsruhe–Mühlacker	4 July 1861
Heidelberg–Meckesheim–Mosbach	Baden Odenwald Railway	23 October 1862
Pforzheim–Mühlacker	Karlsruhe–Mühlacker	1 June 1863
Waldshut–Schaffhausen–Singen–Konstanz	High Rhine Railway	13 June 1863
Offenburg–Hausach	Black Forest Railway (Baden)	2 July 1866
Mosbach–Osterburken–Lauda–Heidingsfeld	Baden Odenwald Railway	25 August 1866
Singen–Engen	Black Forest Railway	6 September 1866
Radolfzell–Stockach	Hegau-Ablachtal Railway	20 July 1867
Mannheim–Ludwigshafen am Rhein ¹	Mannheim–Ludwigshafen	10 August 1867
Lauda–Hochhausen	Tauber Valley Railway	10 October 1867
Engen–Donaueschingen	Black Forest Railway	15 June 1868
Meckesheim–Bad Rappenau	Elsenz Valley Railway	25 June 1868
Hochhausen–Wertheim	Tauber Valley Railway	15 October 1868
Bad Rappenau–Jagstfeld	Elsenz Valley Railway	5 August 1869
Donaueschingen–Villingen	Black Forest Railway	16 August 1869
Königshofen–Bad Mergentheim	Tauber Valley Railway	23 October 1869
Stockach–Meßkirch	Hegau-Ablachtal Railway	3 February 1870
Weil am Rhein–Saint-Louis ¹	–	11 February 1872
Schwackenreute–Pfullendorf	Altshausen–Schwackenreute railway	11 August 1873
Meßkirch–Mengen	Hegau-Ablachtal Railway	6 September 1873
Krauchenwies–Sigmaringen	Sigmaringen–Krauchenwies railway	6 September 1873
Hausach–Villingen	Black Forest Railway	1 November 1873
Bruchsal–Graben-Neudorf–Rheinsheim	Bruchsal–Germersheim	23 November 1874
Lauchringen–Stühlingen	Wutach Valley Railway	22 April 1875
Stühlingen–Weizen (bei Stühlingen)	Wutach Valley Railway	15 October 1876
Rheinsheim–Germersheim ¹	Bruchsal–Germersheim	15 May 1877
Müllheim–Neuenburg am Rhein–Mülhausen ¹	Müllheim–Mulhouse railway	6 February 1878
Hausach–Wolfach	Kinzig Valley Railway	15 July 1878
Neckargemünd–Eberbach–Jagstfeld	Neckar Valley Railway	24 May 1879
Mannheim-Friedrichsfeld–Schwetzingen	–	1 June 1880
Wolfach–Schiltach	Kinzig Valley Railway	4 November 1886
Freiburg im Breisgau–Neustadt (Black Forest)	Höllental Railway	23 May 1887
Weil am Rhein–Lörrach	–	20 May 1890
Schopfheim–Bad Säckingen	Wehra Valley Railway	20 May 1890
Weizen (near Stühlingen)–Immendingen	Wutach Valley Railway	20 May 1890
Seckach–Walldürn	Seckach–Miltenberg	1 December 1887
Graben-Neudorf–Blankenloch–Karlsruhe– Durmersheim–Rastatt–Roppenheim (Alsace)¹	Rhine Railway	1 May 1895
New Karlsruhe marshalling yard	–	1 May 1895
Karlsruhe marshalling yard–Karlsruhe West–Knielingen	–	1 May 1895
Stahringen–Überlingen	Stahringen–Friedrichshafen railway	18 August 1895
Walldürn–Amorbach ¹	Seckach–Miltenberg	20 September 1899
Steinsfurt–Eppingen	–	15 November 1900
Waldkirch–Elzach	Elz Valley Railway	20 August 1901
Neustadt (Black Forest)–Donaueschingen	Höllental Railway	20 August 1901
Überlingen–Friedrichshafen ¹	Stahringen–Friedrichshafen railway	1 October 1901
Oberuhldingen–Unteruhldingen	–	2 October 1901
Marbach (near Villingen)–Bad Dürrheim	–	31 July 1904
Freiburg im Breisgau goods relief line	–	4 September 1905
Mannheim-Rheinau–Brühl (Baden)	Rheinau–Ketsch	1 October 1905
Mimmenhausen-Neufrach–Frickingen	–	1 December 1905
New Basel goods station	–	15 December 1905
Bruchsal goods relief line	–	29 January 1906
New Mannheim marshalling yard, southern section	–	1 October 1906
New Mannheim marshalling yard, northern section	–	1 May 1907
Kappel-Gutachbrücke – Lenzkirch – Bonndorf	–	24 September 1907
Weisenbach–Forbach	Murg Valley Railway	15 June 1910
New Offenburg station and Windschläg–Offenburg goods line	–	6 November 1911
Walldürn–Hardheim	Walldürn–Hardheim	23 November 1911
Brühl (Baden)–Ketsch	Rheinau–Ketsch	1 July 1912
New Basel Baden station	–	13 September 1913
New Karlsruhe central station	–	23 October 1913
Singen–Beuren-Büßlingen	–	21 November 1913
New Heidelberg goods station	–	2 March 1914
Tauberbischofsheim–Königheim	Tauberbischofsheim–Königheim	1 December 1914
Forbach–Raumünzach	Murg Valley Railway	4 June 1915

On the cross-border lines marked with ¹ only the section as far as the border belonged to the Baden State Railways. The Basel link line was built by the Swiss Central Railway and co-financed by the Baden State Railway. The state railway had a special role for the only narrow gauge line, from Mosbach–Mudau, that opened on 3 June 1905. The firm of Vering & Waechter were contracted to build and run this line.

State-operated private lines:

Section	As part of the route	Opened on	Built by
Basel Baden station–Schopfheim	Wiese Valley Railway	7 June 1862	Wiesental Railway Company
Karlsruhe–Maxau	Maxau Railway	5 August 1862	City of Karlsruhe
Maxau–Maximiliansau ¹	Maxau Railway	8 May 1865	City of Karlsruhe
Dinglingen–Lahr (Black Forest)	–	15 November 1865	Lahr Railway Company
Rastatt–Gernsbach	Murg Valley Railway	1 June 1869	Murgthal Railway Company
Mannheim–Schwetzingen–Graben-Neudorf– Eggenstein–Karlsruhe	Rhine Railway	4 August 1870	City of Mannheim
Freiburg im Breisgau–Breisach	–	6 February 1871	City of Freiburg, Town of Breisach
Heidelberg–Schwetzingen	Heidelberg–Speyer	17 July 1873	N.N.
Schwetzingen–Speyer	Heidelberg–Speyer	10 December 1873	N.N.
Denzlingen–Waldkirch	Elz Valley Railway	1 January 1875	Town of Waldkirch
Schopfheim–Zell im Wiesental	Wiese Valley Railway	5 February 1876	Schopfheim-Zeller Railway Company
Appenweier–Oppenau	Rench Valley Railway	1 June 1876	Renchtal Railway Company
Breisach–Colmar ¹	Freiburg–Colmar	5 January 1878	City of Freiburg, Breisach, Baden
Grötzingen–Bretten–Eppingen	Kraichgau Railway	15 October 1879	Town of Karlsruhe
Ettlingen West–Ettlingen Erbprinz	Alb Valley Railway	25 August 1885	Town of Ettlingen
Ettlingen Erbprinz–Ettlingen Stadt	Alb Valley Railway	15 July 1887	Town of Ettlingen
Gernsbach–Weisenbach	Murg Valley Railway	1 May 1894	Murgthal Railway Company

Apart from the Ettlingen West–Ettlingen Stadt line, taken over by the B.L.E.A.G. (Baden Branch Lines) on 1 January 1899, all state-operated private lines went into state ownership over the course of time. In addition to those lines run by the Baden State Railways there were also fully private lines after 1889 that are not listed.

The Deutsche Reichs Railway completed the following routes within the Baden railway network by 1945:

Section	As part of the route	Opened on
Oppenau–Bad Peterstal	Rench Valley Railway	28 November 1926
Titisee–Seebrugg	Three Lakes Line	1 December 1926
Raumünzach–Klosterreichenbach	Murg Valley Railway	13 April 1928
Neckarsteinach–Schönau (Odenwald)	Neckarsteinach–Schönau	21 October 1928
Bad Peterstal–Bad Griesbach	Rench Valley Railway	25 May 1933
Tuttlingen–Hattingen (Baden)	Tuttlingen–Hattingen railway line	15 May 1934
Freiburg im Breisgau–Freiburg-Wiehre	Höllental Railway	8 November 1934

In addition several routes were built by foreign state railways that ran through Baden territory. The section from Bretten to Bruchsal was transferred in 1878 to the ownership of the Baden State Railways.

Section	As part of the route	Opened on	Operator
Heidelberg–Weinheim–Frankfurt	Main-Neckar Line	1 August 1846	Main-Neckar Line
Mühlacker–Bretten–Bruchsal	Württemberg Western Railway	1 December 1853	K.W.St.E.
Pforzheim–Bad Wildbad	Enz Valley Railway	11 June 1868	K.W.St.E.
Rottweil–Villingen	–	26 August 1869	K.W.St.E.
Jagstfeld–Osterburken	–	27 September 1869	K.W.St.E.
Tuttlingen–Immendingen	Plochingen–Immendingen railway	26 July 1870	K.W.St.E.
Konstanz–Kreuzlingen Hafen–Romanshorn	Seelinie	1 July 1871	Swiss Northeast Railway
Basel Baden station–Basel Central station	Basel Link Line	3 November 1873	Swiss Central Railway
Pforzheim–Calw	Nagold Valley Railway	1 June 1874	K.W.St.E.
Singen–Etzwilen–Winterthur	–	17 July 1875	Swiss National Railway
Konstanz–Kreuzlingen–Etzwilen	–	17 July 1875	Swiss National Railway
Pfullendorf–Aulendorf	–	14 August 1875	K.W.St.E.
Mannheim Neckarstadt–Biblis	Ried Railway	15 October 1879	Hessian Ludwig Railway
Mannheim-Waldhof–Käfertal–Mannheim Haupt station	Ried Railway	1 May 1880	Hessian Ludwig Railway
Schwaigern–Eppingen	Kraichgau Railway	18 August 1880	K.W.St.E.
Lohr–Wertheim	Main Valley Railway	1 October 1881	K.Bay.Sts.B
Erbach–Eberbach	Odenwald Railway	27 May 1882	Hessian Ludwig Railway
Freudenstadt–Schiltach	Kinzig Valley Railway	4 November 1886	K.W.St.E.
Tuttlingen–Sigmaringen	Tuttlingen–Sigmaringen railway	27 November 1890	K.W.St.E.
Schramberg–Schiltach	–	9 November 1892	K.W.St.E.
Weinheim–Fürth (Odenwald)	Weschnitz Valley Railway	1895	Prussian-Hessian Railway Company
Schaffhausen–Jestetten–Eglisau	–	1 June 1897	Swiss Northeast Railway
Weinheim–Lampertheim	Weinheim–Worms railway	1905	Prussian-Hessian Railway Company
Miltenberg–Wertheim	Main Valley Railway	1 October 1912	K.Bay.Sts.B

== Running and rolling stock ==
Composite Coach. Built 1878 by Swiss Industrial Company.

The first two steam locomotives for the Baden State Railways were built by the English locomotive works of Sharp, Roberts and Company and delivered in 1839. They were given the names Löwe and Greif (Lion and Griffin). As the railway network expanded the size of the fleet grew rapidly. When the railways were converted from broad to standard gauge in 1854/55, there were already 66 locomotives, 65 tenders and 1,133 wagons in the fleet. At the end of the First World War the vehicle inventory included 915 locomotives, 27,600 goods wagons and 2,500 passenger coaches, of which 106 locomotives, 7,307 goods wagons and 400 passenger coaches had to be given to the victorious powers as reparations in accordance with the Versailles Treaty. An overview of Baden's locomotive classes may be found in the List of Baden locomotives and railbuses.

The Baden State Railways fostered the growth of an indigenous railway vehicle industry in Baden, because they preferred to buy from local firms such as the engineering works of Kessler and Martiensen in Karlsruhe, which later became the Maschinengesellschaft Karlsruhe ('Karlsruhe Engineering Company'). And two coach manufacturers emerged in Baden in the shape of Waggonfabrik Fuchs founded in Heidelberg in 1862 and Waggonfabrik Rastatt in 1897. Some coaches were also purchased by the Swiss Industrial Company.

In 1849, the Baden State Railways established the Karlsruhe Railway Repair Works as the main workshop for the maintenance of all its rolling stock. The plant would employ more than 5,200 people at its peak around the end of World War I.

== See also ==
- List of Baden locomotives and railbuses
- History of rail transport in Germany
- Grand Duchy of Hesse State Railways
- Prussian state railways
