= Class 99 (German narrow gauge locomotives) =

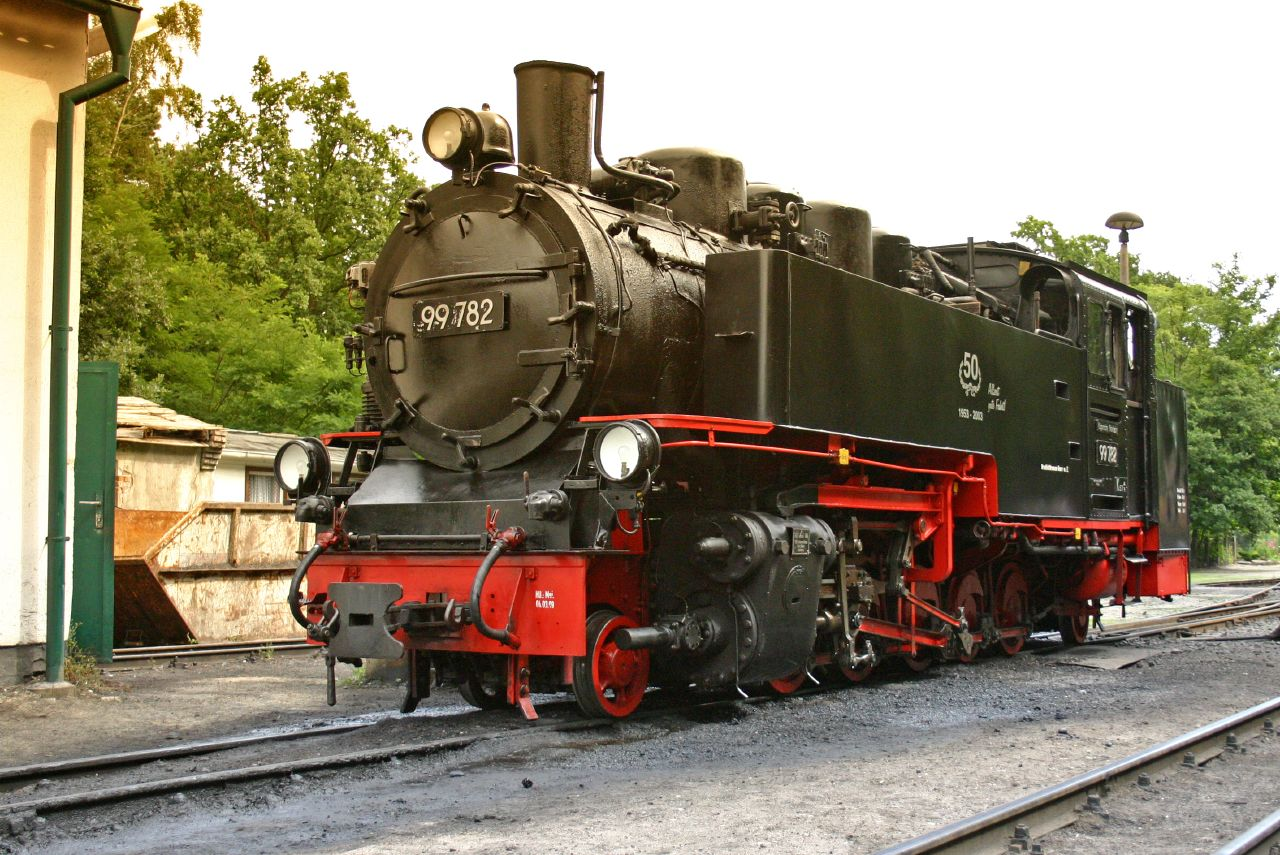
A picture of the Class 99.78

Class 99 is the classification of German narrow gauge locomotives used by the Deutsche Reichsbahn or its successor administrations. It is therefore divided into numerous sub-classes that are listed in this table.

DR or DB class	former class	Rail gauge	Axle arrangement
99.00	Palatine L 2	1,000 mm metre gauge	B n2t
99.00^{II}	Chemin de fer Départementaux-Réseau d'Indre et Loire No. 5	1.000 mm	C n2t
99.01	Palatine Pts 2/2	1.000 mm	B h2t
99.02	Oldenburg B	1.000 mm	B n2t
99.03–06	Prussian T 33	1.000 mm	C n2t
99.07	Bavarian LE	1.000 mm	C n2t
99.08–09	Palatine L 1	1.000 mm	C n2t
99.093	Palatine Pts 3/3 N	1.000 mm	C n2t
99.10	Palatine Pts 3/3 H	1.000 mm	C h2t
99.12	Württemberg Ts 3	1.000 mm	C n2t
99.13	Bavarian Pts 3/4	1.000 mm	1'C h2t
99.15	Bavarian Gts 4/4	1.000 mm	D n2t
99.16	Saxon I M	1.000 mm	B'B' n4vt
99.17	Württemberg Ts 4	1.000 mm	D n2t
99.18	(Prussian T 40)	1.000 mm	E h2t
99.19	(Württemberg Ts 5)	1.000 mm	E h2t
99.20	Bavarian Gts 2x3/3	1.000 mm	C'C h4vt
99.21	New class for the Wangerooge Island railway	1.000 mm	C n2t
99.22	Einheitslokomotive	1.000 mm	1'E1' h2t
99 231+232	CVE F	1.000 mm	C n2t
99 233–235	CVE C	1.000 mm	C n2t
99 236–240	CVE G	1.000 mm	C n2t
99 241+242	CVE H	1.000 mm	C n2t
99 243	CVE I	1.000 mm	C n2t
99 244+245	CVE D	1.000 mm	C n2t
99 246+247	CVE E	1.000 mm	C n2t
99.23–24	DR Neubaulokomotive	1.000 mm	1'E1' h2t
99.24^{II}	Pillkaller Kleinbahn 21–25	1.000 mm	1'C n2t
99.25	LAG Nos. 61, 62, 67	1.000 mm	C 1' n2t
99.26	LAG No. 64	1.000 mm	D h2t
99.27	CVE B	1.000 mm	1'C n2t
99.27^{II}	ZVTM Nos. 21	1.000 mm	B n2t
99.28	CVE A	1.000 mm	B'B' n2t
99.28^{II}	ex-French loco	1.000 mm	C n2t
99.29	PH N	1.000 mm	C n2t
99.29^{II}	Tram d' Ardèche	1.000 mm	C n2t
99.30	Mecklenburg T 7	900 mm	C n2t
99.31	(Mecklenburg T 42)	900 mm	D n2t
99.32	Einheitslokomotive	900 mm	1'D1' h2t
99.33	SDAG Wismut Nos. 1, 22, 44	900 mm	D h2t / D n2t
99.40	Prussian T 37	785 mm	D n2t
99.41–42	Prussian T 38	785 mm	D h2t
99.43–44	Prussian T 39	785 mm	E h2t
99.45–46	PKP Class T 40	785 mm	E h2t
99.50	Württemberg Tss 3	750 mm	C n2t
99.51–60	Saxon IV K	750 mm	B'B' n4vt
99.61	Saxon V K	750 mm	D n2vt
99.62	Württemberg Tss 4	750 mm	D n2t
99.63	Württemberg Tssd	750 mm	B'B n4vt
99.64–65	Saxon VI K	750 mm	E h2t
99.67–71	DRG copy	750 mm	E h2 t
99.73–76	Einheitslokomotive	750 mm	1'E1' h2t
99.77–79	DR Neubaulokomotive	750 mm	1'E1' h2t
99.79	FBB Nos. 11 to 13	750 mm	C 1' n2t
99.80	NÖLB Class Uv	760 mm Bosnian gauge	C 1' n2vt
99.81–82	NÖLB Class Uh	760 mm	C 1' h2t
99.83	JDŽ Class 81	760 mm	D n2t
99.90	kkStB Class Yv	760 mm	C 2' n2vt
99.100	BBÖ Class P	760 mm	D 1' h2t
99.110	NÖLB Class Mv	760 mm	D 2' n2vt
99.111	NÖLB Class Mh	760 mm	D 2' h2t
99.120	BBÖ Class Kh	760 mm	E h2t
99.130	ČSD Class U 48.0	760 mm	1'D 1' n2t
99.140	SŽD Class ГР	750 mm	D h2
99.150	PKP Class B	600 mm	B n2t
99.151	PKP Class C 1	600 mm	C n2t
99.152	PKP Class C 3	600 mm	C h2t
99.153-158	PKP Class D 1, D 3	600 mm	D n2t
99.158-160	PKP Class D	600 mm	D h2t
99.161	PKP Class E, Es	600 mm	E n2t
99.162	PKP Nos. 1334	600 mm	E n2
99.163	PKP Nos. 4223+4262, LG Nos. K 4-402	600 mm	E n2
99.164		600 mm	C'C' h4t
99.250	PKP Class C 6, C 10, C 11	750 mm	C n2t
99.251–253	PKP Class C 6, C 9	750 mm	C n2t
99.254	PKP Nos. 3003	750 mm	C1' n2t
99.255–256	PKP Class D 5, D 7	750 mm	D n2t
99.256	PKP Class D 8, PKP Nos. 1690	750 mm	D n2vt D n2t
99.257	PKP Class D 6	750 mm	D n2vt
99.257–258	PKP Class Wp 29	750 mm	D h2t
99.270	Pillkaller Kleinbahn 21–25	1000 mm	1'C n2t
99.300	MPSB no nos.	600 mm	B n2(t)
99.330	WEM No. 1 Graf Arnim	600 mm	C n2(t)
99.331	WEM Nos. 2–7	600 mm	D n2t
99.335	MPSB Nos. 1^{II}, 4^{II}, 5^{II}	600 mm	C 1' n2(t)
99.336	MPSB Nos. 14^{II}	600 mm	D h2
99.345	MPSB No. 8^{II}	600 mm	C 1' h2(t)
99.346	MPSB Nos. 9^{II}, 12^{II}	600 mm	D h2
99.365	MPSB Nos. 21^{III}, 32^{II}	600 mm	B n2t
99.400	Heeresfeldbahnlok	750 mm	C n2t
99.405		750 mm	D n2
99.430	KJI No. 23	750 mm	C n2t
99.440		750 mm	
99.450	Prignitzer KKB 14–17, 21–22, 23	750 mm	C n2t
99.451	RSN Nos. 1–5	750 mm	C 1' n2t
99.452	Lenz-Typ nn (RüKB Nos. 31nn–35nn)	750 mm	B'B n4vt
99.453	TB Glückauf and Trusetal	750 mm	D n2t
99.454	SŽD Class Щ	750 mm	D h2
99.455	KJI No. 11	750 mm	D n2 /D n2t
99.460	Lenz-Typ m (DKBO No. 2m, RüKB 7m, 9m)	750 mm	B n2t
99.461	Trusebahn No. 6; KKP 1, 2; KJI Nos. 9, 10	750 mm	C n2t
99.462	Prussian T 36 (RüKB No. 265)	750 mm (785 mm)	C 2' n2t
99.463	RüKB Nos. 51Mh to 53Mh	750 mm	D h2t
99.464	KJI Nos. 11–16	750 mm	D n2t
99.465	JLKB Nos. 1, 4 and 5	750 mm	C n2
99.470	PKKB Nos. 18 and 19	750 mm	C n2t
99.471	PKKB Nos. 20; FBB Nos. 11 to 13	750 mm	C 1' n2t
99.472	KJI No. 22	750 mm	B n2t
99.480	KJI Nos. 20 and 21	750 mm	1' D h2t (D h2t)
99.500	Spremberger Stadtbahn No. 11	1.000 mm	B h2t
99.520	Spremberger Stadtbahn No. 12	1.000 mm	B n2t
99.560	Lenz-Typ i (FKB Nos. 1–6, PLB Nos. 119–124)	1.000 mm	B n2t
99.561	Salzwedeler Kleinbahn No. 5 (FKB No. 9°, PLB No. 130)	1.000 mm	C n2t
99.562	Lenz-Typ ii (FKB Nos. 7, 8, PLB Nos. 165, 166)	1.000 mm	B'B n4vt
99.563	(NWE Nos. 71 and 72)	1.000 mm	C 1' n4vt
99 5633	Pillkaller Kleinbahn 21–25	1.000 mm	1' C n2t
99.570	Spreewaldbahn Nos. 1 to 7	1.000 mm	C n2t
99.571	GMWE Nos. 1 to 4, 6	1.000 mm	B'B n4vt
99.580	Lenz-Typ x (HHE Nos. 3x–4x), NWE Nos. 1 to 3	1.000 mm	B n2t
99.581	GHE – Selke to Hasselfelde	1.000 mm	C n2t
99.590	NWE Nos. 11 to 22, NWE Nos. 41	1.000 mm	B'B n4vt
99.591	GMWE Nos. 7 and 8	1.000 mm	D h2t
99.600	NWE No. 21	1.000 mm	1'C1' h2t
99.601	NWE Nos. 51 and 52	1.000 mm	(1'B)'B1' h4vt
99.610	NWE Nos. 6 and 7	1.000 mm	C h2t/C n2t
99.710	Prussian T 31	1.000 mm	C n2t
99.720	Mosbach–Mudau Nos. 1 to 4 (aka Baden C)	1.000 mm	C n2t
99.730-731	BBÖ Class Zz	1.000 mm	2 1' n2(b)t
99.750-752	Saxon I K	750 mm	C n2t
99.754	Saxon III K	750 mm	C 1'n2t
99.780	BBÖ Class T	760 mm	C 1'n2t
99.781-782	kkStB U	760 mm	C 1'n2t
99.783	Steyrtalbahn 1–6	760 mm	C 1'n2t
99.784	ČSD Class U 37.0	760 mm	C 1'n2t

== Bibliography ==
- Weisbrod, Manfred, Hans Müller and Wolfgang Petznik (1995). Dampflokomotiven deutscher Eisenbahnen. Band 4: Baureihe 99. Berlin: Transpress. ISBN 9783344709037

== See also ==
- Narrow-gauge small locomotives of the Deutsche Reichsbahn
- Deutsche Reichsbahn
- Deutsche Bundesbahn
- Deutsche Reichsbahn (East Germany)
- List of DRG locomotives and railbuses
- Einheitsdampflokomotive
