= Württemberg Tss 4 =

German 750 mm gauge 0-8-0T locomotives – class of 3

Württemberg Tss 4 DRG Class 99.62
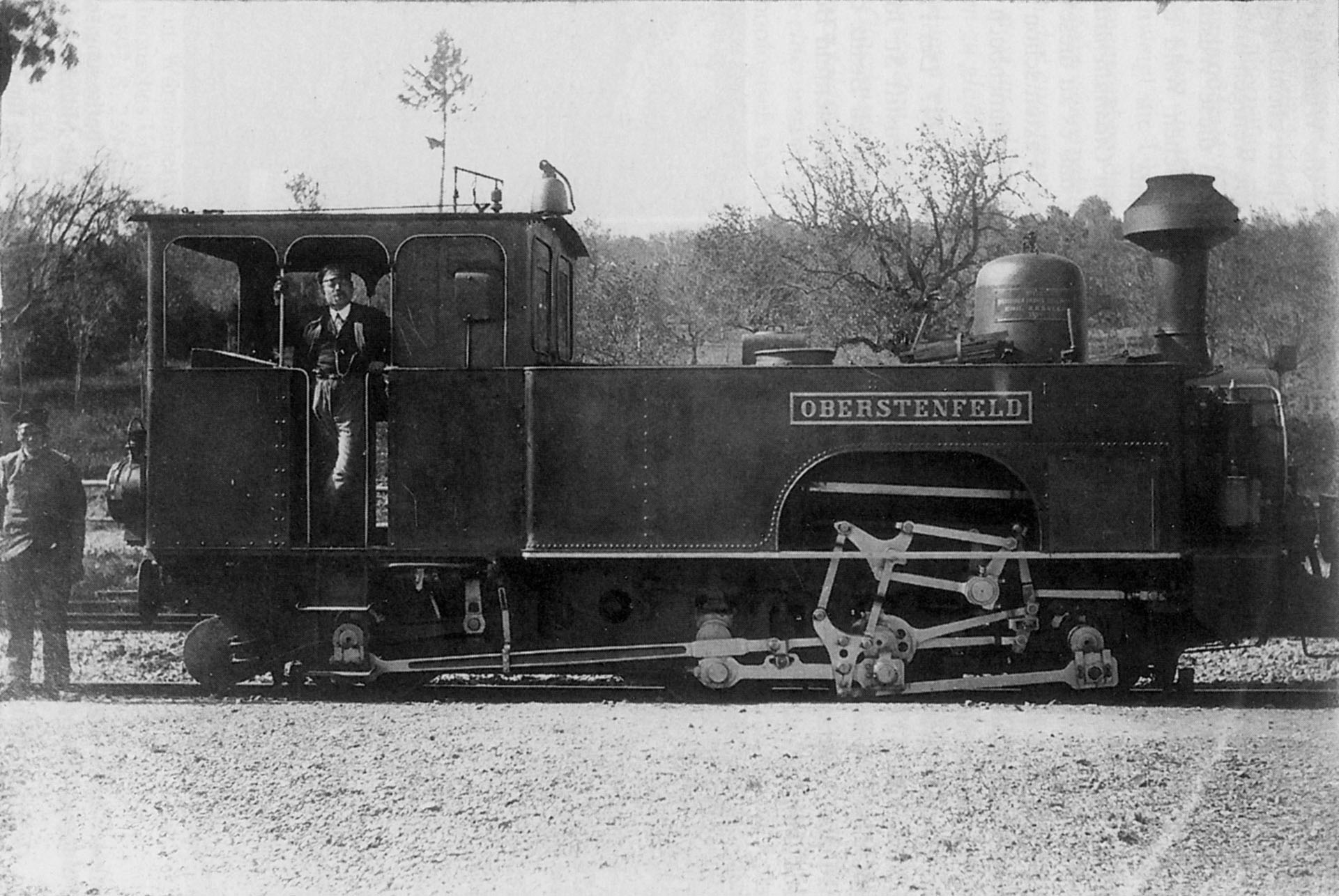
- No. 12 OBERSTENFELD in May 1895
Type and origin
- Builder: Maschinenfabrik Esslingen
- Build date: 1894
- Total produced: 3
Specifications
  - German: K 44.7
- Gauge: 750 mm (2 ft 5 1/2 in)
- Driver dia.: 900 mm (2 ft 11 3/8 in)
- Wheelbase
  - Overall: 4,500 mm (14 ft 9 1/4 in)
- Length
  - Over beams: 8,115 mm (26 ft 7 1/2 in)
- Width: 2,400 mm (7 ft 10 1/2 in)
- Height: 3,330 mm (10 ft 11 1/8 in)
- Adhesive weight: 27.72 t (27.28 long tons; 30.56 short tons)
- Empty weight: 21.22 t (20.88 long tons; 23.39 short tons)
- Service weight: 27.72 t (27.28 long tons; 30.56 short tons)
- Fuel capacity: 1.0 t (2,200 lb) of coal
- Water cap.: 3.04 m^{3} (670 imp gal; 800 US gal)
- Boiler pressure: 12 kgf/cm^{2} (1,180 kPa; 171 lbf/in^{2})
- Heating surface
  - Firebox: 0.98 m^{2} (10.5 sq ft)
  - Evaporative: 59.67 m^{2} (642.3 sq ft)
- Cylinders: Two, inside
- Cylinder size: 340 mm (13 3/8 in)
- Piston stroke: 500 mm (19 11/16 in)
- Valve gear: Klose
Performance figures
- Maximum speed: 30 km/h (19 mph)
Career
- Numbers: K.W.St.E.: 11–13; DR: 99 621 – 99 622
- Retired: by 1928

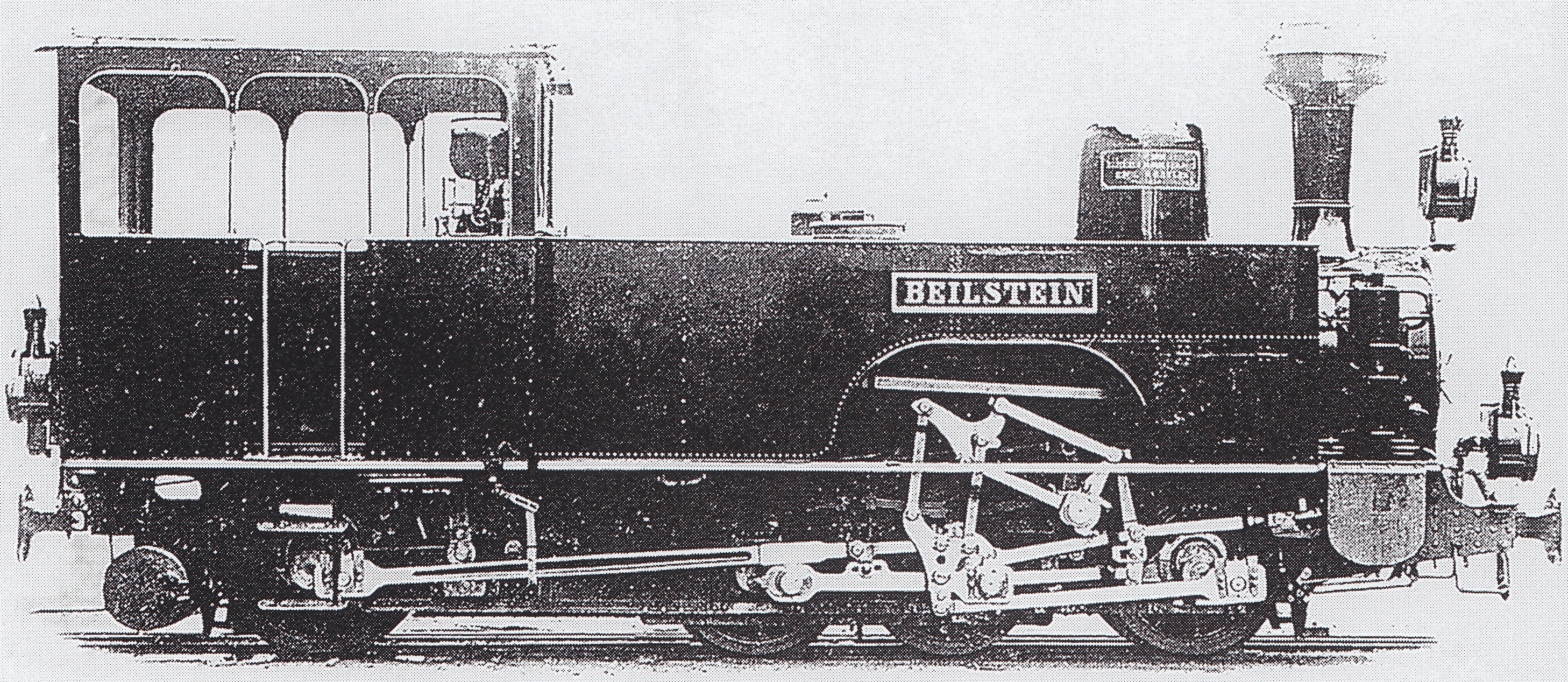
Maschinenfabrik Esslingen works' photograph of the last Württemberg Tss 4: No. 13 BEILSTEIN

The Württemberg Tss 4 was a class of three 750-mm gauge 0-8-0T locomotives of the Royal Württemberg State Railways (Königlich Württembergischen Staats-Eisenbahnen, K.W.St.E.). They were used on the Bottwartalbahn between Heilbronn Süd and Marbach am Neckar. While in service, the locomotives were based at Beilstein. The Tss 4 were the first 750-mm gauge steam locomotives to be equipped with the Klose drive system.

== History ==
The three Tss 4 locomotives were given the fleet numbers 11, 12 and 13; they also carried names: no. 11 GROSSBOTTWAR, no. 12 OBERSTENFELD and no. 13 BEILSTEIN. They were built by Maschinenfabrik Esslingen, who assigned serial numbers 2638 to 2640. They entered service on 10 May 1894 with the opening of the section from Marbach to Beilstein. When the entire route was commissioned on 1 December 1990, they were then used to Heilbronn Süd. At the beginning they managed the traffic alone. Quiet running and traction were convincing. From 1899 the Tss 4s got company from number 42, a Tssd class Mallet tank locomotive. More Tssd locomotives were procured for the Bottwartalbahn, which meant a departure from the maintenance-intensive Klose drive system. Nevertheless, the three Tss 4 remained in service until the early days of the Deutsche Reichsbahn, even if in the 1920s the locomotives were often stored or under repair because of their worn out Klose drive. The arrival in 1923 of the newer Saxon VI K sealed the fate of the Tss 4 on the mainline. Numbers 12 and 13 received their Reichsbahn numbers 99 621 and 99 622. Number 11 was not renumbered and was stored in 1923. The other two locomotives were stored in 1926. Number 11 had been struck-off the roster by 1925, the other two locomotives were retired in 1928, and then scrapped.

== Technical features ==
The three tank locomotives were derived from the Ts 4 and adapted to the gauge of 750 mm (2 ft 5 1/2 in). The wheelbase, however, was extended to 4.5 m (14 ft 9 1/4 in). Unlike the meter-gauge Ts 4, the fourth axle under the driver's cab was positioned at a large distance from the third axle. The locomotives had two inside cylinders arranged at an angle. They worked on the second axle, which was firmly located in the outer frame and which was designed without flanges. The valve gear, the two valve boxes with the slide valves and the motion were attached outside of the frame. The valve gear was of the Klose type and therefore had levers arranged according to the pattern of a double parallelogram. It was located below the large cutout in the water tank above the second axle. The first and fourth axes were swivelled in via the third axle, which could be moved laterally by ±31 mm (1 7/32 in), according to the radius of the track curve by shortening or lengthening the coupling rods using the levers in the parallelograms according to the curve.

The cab was open at the sides and at the back. In order not to expose the locomotive crew to wind and weather when reversing, the locomotives could be turned on the turntables in Marbach and Heilbronn-Süd and therefore always drove with the chimney leading. The water tanks on the side of the boiler reached up to the smokebox. Coal was carried in the driver's cab. The locomotives carried 3.04 m^{3} (670 imp gal; 800 US gal) of water and 1.0 tonne (2,200 lb) of coal. On delivery, the locomotives had Kobel chimneys to suppress flying embers. They were later replaced by tall, conical chimneys.

The locomotives had a riveted plate metal frame. The three-ring long boiler had a distance of 3.30 m (10 ft 10 in) between the tube plates. The steam dome was on the first boiler ring, the sand dome on the second. There was a Ramsbottom safety valve that was initially located on the firebox inside the cab. It was later installed on the boiler behind the steam dome.

A Westinghouse air brake for the train and an external spindle brake were available on the brakes. This worked diagonally from above on the second axle. There was also a hand-operated sanding device.
