= Bavarian Gts 4/4 =

Bavarian Gts 4/4 DRG Class 99.15
Type and origin
- Builder: Krauss
- Build date: 1909
- Total produced: 1
Specifications
- Configuration
  - Whyte: 0-8-0T
  - German: K 44.7
- Gauge: 1,000 mm (3 ft 3 3/8 in)
- Driver dia.: 800 mm (2 ft 7 1/2 in)
- Wheelbase
  - Overall: 2,600 mm (8 ft 6 1/4 in)
- Length
  - Over beams: 8,442 mm (27 ft 8 1/4 in)
- Height: 3,565 mm (11 ft 8 1/4 in)
- Empty weight: 20.70 t (20.37 long tons; 22.82 short tons)
- Service weight: 26.0 t (25.6 long tons; 28.7 short tons)
- Fuel capacity: 1.44 t (3,200 lb) coal
- Water cap.: 2.2 m^{3} (480 imp gal; 580 US gal)
- Boiler
- No. of heating tubes: 108
- Heating tube length: 3,260 mm (10 ft 8 1/4 in)
- Boiler pressure: 12 kgf/cm^{2} (1,180 kPa; 171 lbf/in^{2})
- Heating surface
  - Firebox: 0.82 m^{2} (8.8 sq ft)
  - Radiative: 3.64 m^{2} (39.2 sq ft)
  - Tubes: 44.65 m^{2} (480.6 sq ft)
  - Evaporative: 48.29 m^{2} (519.8 sq ft)
- Cylinders: 2
- Cylinder size: 320 mm (12 5/8 in)
- Piston stroke: 400 mm (15 3/4 in)
- Valve gear: Walschaerts (Heusinger) with straight rocker arm (Schwinge)
- Train brakes: Westinghouse compressed-air brake
Performance figures
- Maximum speed: 30 km/h (19 mph)
- Indicated power: 150 PS (110 kW; 148 hp)
Career
- Numbers: K.Bay.StsE.: 991; DRG: 99 151
- Retired: 1935

The only Bavarian Class Gts 4/4 locomotive in the Royal Bavarian State Railways (Königlich Bayerische Staatsbahn) was built in 1909 for the meter gauge line between Eichstätt and Kinding.

The four coupled axles were very close together, so that tight curves could be negotiated. The centre axles were installed with side play, which meant the connecting rod had to drive the fourth axle. The wheelbase was only 2.6 metres and, with the overall length of the locomotive being almost 8.5 metres, it had very long overhangs. The result was a relatively rough ride.

A striking feature was the very large size of the driver's cab. The locomotive frame was designed as a water tank, and on the steam dome was a safety valve protected by a housing. The engine carried 2.2 m^{3} of water and 1.2 tonnes of coal.

The locomotive was mainly used in rollbock services between Eichstätt and a quarry. After the formation of the Deutsche Reichsbahn it was taken over and grouped as DRG Class 99.15 with the number 99 151. The engine was retired in 1935, after the conversion of the route to standard gauge.

== See also ==
- List of Bavarian locomotives and railbuses
- Bavarian branch lines

== Sources ==
- Hoecherl, Ernst (1984). Eichstätter Schmalspurbahn 1885-1934. Egglham und München: Bufe-Fachbuch-Verlag. ISBN 3-922138-18-7.
- Weisbrod, Manfred; Petznik, Wolfgang (1981). Dampflokomotiven deutscher Eisenbahnen, Baureihe 97–99 (EFA 1.4) (in German) (2nd ed.). Düsseldorf: Alba. pp. 118–119. ISBN 3-87094-087-5.
