= Palatine Pts 3/3 H =

Palatine Pts 3/3 H DRG Class 99.10
Type and origin
- Power type: Steam
- Builder: Krauss
- Serial number: 7987–7989
- Build date: 1923
- Total produced: 3
Specifications
- Configuration
  - Whyte: 0-6-0T
  - UIC: C h2t
  - German: K 33.8
- Gauge: 1,000 mm (3 ft 3 3/8 in)
- Driver dia.: 845 mm (2 ft 9 1/4 in)
- Wheelbase
  - Engine: 1,800 mm (5 ft 10 3/4 in)
- Length
  - Over buffers: 5,945 mm (19 ft 6 in)
- Axle load: 8.07 t (7.94 long tons; 8.90 short tons)
- Adhesive weight: 24.2 t (23.8 long tons; 26.7 short tons)
- Service weight: 24.2 t (23.8 long tons; 26.7 short tons)
- Fuel type: Coal
- Fuel capacity: 1,200 kg (2,600 lb)
- Water cap.: 2.0 m^{3} (440 imp gal; 530 US gal)
- Firebox
  - Grate area: 0.85 m^{2} (9.1 sq ft)
- Boiler
  - Pitch: 1,950 mm (6 ft 4 3/4 in)
  - Tube plates: 2,500 mm (98 3/8 in)
  - Small tubes: 44.5 mm (1 3/4 in), 73 off
  - Large tubes: 108 mm (4 1/4 in), 12 off
- Boiler pressure: 12 bar (12.2 kg/cm^{2}; 174 lbf/in^{2})
- Heating surface
  - Firebox: 3.52 m^{2} (37.9 sq ft)
  - Tubes and flues: 31.5 m^{2} (339 sq ft)
  - Total surface: 35.02 m^{2} (377.0 sq ft)
- Superheater
  - Heating area: 10.14 m^{2} (109.1 sq ft)
- Cylinders: Two
- Cylinder size: 350 mm × 350 mm (13 3/4 in × 13 3/4 in)
- Valve gear: Walschaerts (Heusinger)
Performance figures
- Maximum speed: 30 km/h (19 mph)
Career
- Numbers: Pflaz: XXXI–XXXIII; DRG: 99 101 – 98 103
- Retired: 1956–1957

The DRG Class 99.10, formerly the Palatine Class Pts 3/3 H of the Palatinate Railway, was a German narrow gauge steam locomotive. It was the superheated version of the PtS 3/3 N. Unlike the saturated steam version the upper section of these engines was no longer glazed, otherwise they were broadly identical. They could carry up to 2.0 m^{3} of water and 1.2 t of coal.

After the formation of the Deutsche Reichsbahn the engines were taken over and given numbers 99 101 to 99 103. They were retired on 19 April 1956 and 16 August 1957.

== See also ==
- Royal Bavarian State Railways
- Palatinate Railway
- List of Bavarian locomotives and railbuses
- List of Palatine locomotives and railbuses
