= DRG Class 99.19 =

Class of metre-gauge German steam locomotive

DRG Class 99.19 (Württemberg Ts 5)
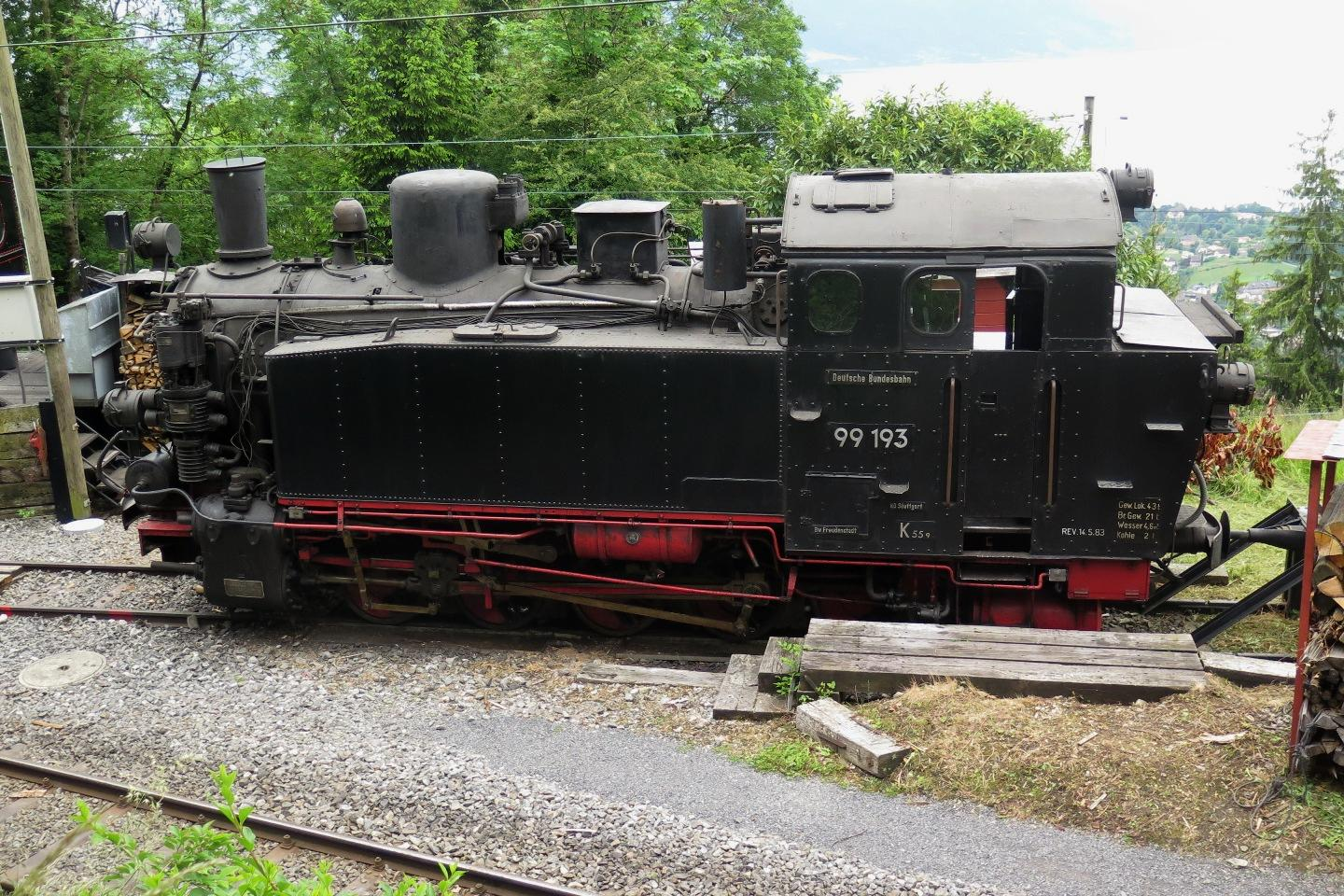
- 99 193 on the Blonay-Chamby Railway in 2014
Type and origin
- Power type: Steam
- Builder: Maschinenfabrik Esslingen
- Serial number: 4181–4184
- Build date: 1927
- Total produced: 4
Specifications
- Configuration
  - Whyte: 0-10-0T
  - UIC: E h2t
  - German: K 55.9
- Driver: 4th coupled axle
- Gauge: 1,000 mm (3 ft 3 3/8 in)
- Driver dia.: 800 mm (2 ft 7 1/2 in)
- Wheelbase
  - Axle spacing (Asymmetrical): 930 mm (3 ft 5/8 in) +; 930 mm (3 ft 5/8 in) +; 930 mm (3 ft 5/8 in) +; 930 mm (3 ft 5/8 in) =
  - Engine: 3,720 mm (12 ft 2 1/2 in)
- Length
  - Over headstocks: 7,060 mm (23 ft 2 in)
  - Over buffers: 8,436 mm (27 ft 8 1/8 in)
- Width: 2,450 mm (8 ft 7/16 in)
- Height: 3,550 mm (11 ft 7 3/4 in)
- Axle load: 8.7 t (8.6 long tons; 9.6 short tons)
- Adhesive weight: 43.5 t (42.8 long tons; 48.0 short tons)
- Empty weight: 33.6 t (33.1 long tons; 37.0 short tons)
- Service weight: 43.5 t (42.8 long tons; 48.0 short tons)
- Fuel type: Coal
- Fuel capacity: 2.5 t (2.5 long tons; 2.8 short tons)
- Water cap.: 4.66 m^{3} (1,030 imp gal; 1,230 US gal)
- Firebox
  - Grate area: 1.60 m^{2} (17.2 sq ft)
- Boiler
  - Pitch: 2,050 mm (6 ft 8 3/4 in)
  - Tube plates: 3,240 mm (10 ft 7 1/2 in)
  - Small tubes: 46 mm (1 13/16 in), 79 off
  - Large tubes: 133 mm (5 1/4 in), 18 off
- Boiler pressure: 14 bar (14.3 kgf/cm^{2}; 203 psi)
- Heating surface
  - Firebox: 6.05 m^{2} (65.1 sq ft)
  - Tubes: 35.25 m^{2} (379.4 sq ft)
  - Flues: 22.90 m^{2} (246.5 sq ft)
  - Total surface: 64.20 m^{2} (691.0 sq ft)
- Superheater
  - Heating area: 24.50 m^{2} (263.7 sq ft)
- Cylinders: Two, outside
- Cylinder size: 430 mm × 400 mm (16 15/16 in × 15 3/4 in)
- Valve gear: Heusinger (Walschaerts)
Performance figures
- Maximum speed: 30 km/h (19 mph)
- Tractive effort: 76.15 kN (17,120 lbf)
Career
- Operators: Deutsche Reichsbahn; → Deutsche Reichsbahn (GDR) (1); → Deutsche Bundesbahn (2)
- Numbers: DRG: 99 191 – 99 194; DR: 99 7191-2 (from 1970)
- Retired: DB: 1959, 1967; DR: 1975

The DRG Class 99.19 engines were metre gauge, ten-coupled, superheated, steam locomotives that were built in 1927 for the railway between Nagold and Altensteig.

The class was to have been procured by the Royal Württemberg State Railways (German: Königlich Württembergische Staats-Eisenbahnen) as the Class Ts 5, however the intervention of the First World War and the serious economic situation that followed put paid to that.

In 1927 the Deutsche Reichsbahn-Gesellschaft ordered the construction of four of these locomotives from the Maschinenfabrik Esslingen. They were based on a Saxon VI K prototype that already ran on Württemberg's 750mm routes and replaced the Class Ts 4 locomotives that worked the metre gauge route between Altensteig and Nagold. They were given operating numbers 99 191 to 99 194.

To negotiate the tight curves the first, third and fifth axles were given side play.

Engine number 99 191 was redeployed on 1 April 1944 to work the line between Eisfeld and Schönbrunn and in 1955 moved to the line from Gera to Wuitz where it worked until the closure of the line in 1970. In the 1970s there was a plan to sell it to the Selfkantbahn museum railway, but the sale did not come to fruition and the engine was scrapped.

Locomotive number 99 192 was retired on 5 May 1959. Number 99 193 was retired on 30 November 1967 and was transferred into the ownership of Eurovapor. It has been on the Blonay–Chamby Museum Railway in Switzerland since 1969. There are various accounts of the whereabouts of 99 194. It probably ended up in Yugoslavia after the Second World War and was in service there until the late 1960s with the Yugoslav Railways.

== See also ==
- Deutsche Reichsbahn
- List of DRG locomotives and railbuses
