= Bavarian Gts 2x3/3 =

Bavarian Gts 2×3/3 DRG Class 99.20
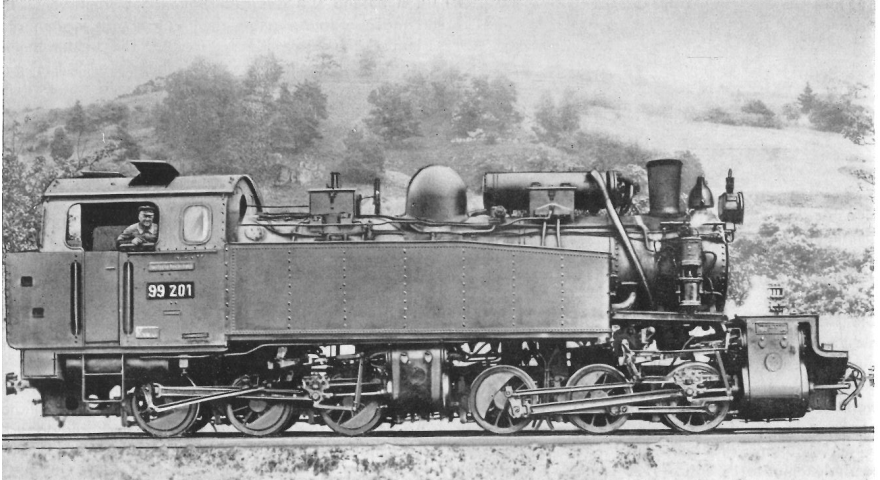
Type and origin
- Builder: Henschel
- Build date: 1917
- Total produced: 1
Specifications
- Configuration
  - Whyte: 0-6-6-0T
  - German: K 66.9
- Gauge: 1,000 mm (3 ft 3 3/8 in)
- Coupled dia.: 900 mm (2 ft 11 3/8 in)
- Wheelbase
  - Bogie: 2,500 mm (8 ft 2 1/2 in)
  - Overall: 7,000 mm (22 ft 11 1/2 in)
- Length
  - Over beams: 11,832 mm (38 ft 9 3/4 in)
- Height: 3,650 mm (11 ft 11 3/4 in)
- Adhesive weight: 54.0 t (53.1 long tons; 59.5 short tons)
- Empty weight: 45.3 t (44.6 long tons; 49.9 short tons)
- Service weight: 54.0 t (53.1 long tons; 59.5 short tons)
- Fuel capacity: 1.5 t (3,300 lb) coal
- Water cap.: 4.5 m^{3} (990 imp gal; 1,200 US gal)
- Boiler pressure: 14 kgf/cm^{2} (1.37 MPa; 199 lbf/in^{2})
- Heating surface
  - Firebox: 1.85 m^{2} (19.9 sq ft)
  - Evaporative: 82.71 m^{2} (890.3 sq ft)
- Superheater
  - Heating area: 34.00 m^{2} (366.0 sq ft)
- Cylinders: Four, compound
- High-pressure cylinder: 400 mm (15 3/4 in)
- Low-pressure cylinder: 620 mm (24 7/16 in)
- Piston stroke: 450 mm (17 11/16 in)
Performance figures
- Maximum speed: 30 km/h (19 mph)
Career
- Numbers: K.Bay.Sts.E: 996 DRG: 99 201
- Retired: 1934

The Bavarian Class Gts 2x3/3 was a former narrow gauge, German Army, military railway, steam locomotive that was in service on the narrow gauge line from Eichstätt to Kinding.

== The State railway locomotive ==
The locomotive was built in 1917 by Henschel & Sohn in Kassel under works number 15160 for the German Army's field railways. After the end of World War I the engine was sold to the Royal Bavarian State Railways (Königlich Bayerische Staatsbahn). It was designated as Class Gts 2x3/3 and was given the number 996. It was employed on the Eichstätt–Kinding narrow gauge route. After the take over of the German state railways by the Deutsche Reichsbahn it was given the number 99 201 and classified as DRG Class 99.20.

In order not to exceed the permitted axle load, the locomotive was equipped with six axles, which were grouped into two groups of three, each with its own driving gear. This compound engine was of the Mallet locomotive type. The preheater was located in front of the chimney and lay parallel to the axis of the locomotive.

The engine could carry 1.5 tonnes of coal and 4.5 m^{2} of water.

After the conversion of its home line, Eichstätt–Kinding, to standard gauge in 1934 the locomotive was withdrawn from service and later scrapped.

== Background information to the locomotive class ==
=== Army field railway locomotives ===
Locomotive 99 201 was one of a total of 20 engines, that Henschel delivered to the German Army for their field railways. Several of the machines were destroyed in the war, others were abandoned abroad, for example in France. Several engines of this series were employed on the Hedjaz railway from Damascus to Medina.

=== Copies ===
After World War I Henschel produced two further copies of this class:

- In 1925 locomotive 104 was built for the line from Zell im Wiesental to Todtnau run by the South German Railway Company (Süddeutsche Eisenbahn-Gesellschaft). This engine was sold to the Blonay–Chamby Museum Railway in Switzerland in 1967.
- In 1928 locomotive no. 12s was delivered to the Alb valley railway. In 1934 this engine then went to the Brohl valley railway. It was scrapped there in 1957.

Unlike the original German Army field railway engines, the copies were built as saturated steam locomotives.

=== Preserved examples ===
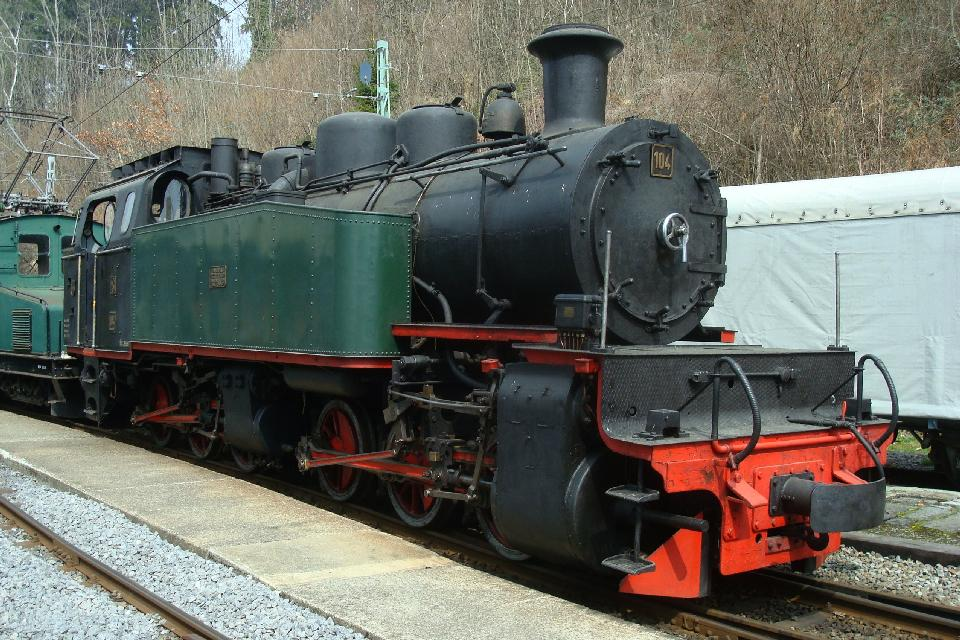
Blonay-Chamby Südwestdeutsche Eisenbahn-Gesellschaft - 105 - 11

No. 104, formerly of the Zell-Todtnau Railway was in service with the Blonay–Chamby Museum Railway at the eastern end of lake Geneva. As of September 2021 the locomotive is under restoration and can be seen in the railway museum there.

Mallet locomotives 413 and 414 of the Chemin de fer du Vivarais do not belong to this class. The two engines were built in the 1930s in Alsace.

== See also ==
- Royal Bavarian State Railways
- List of Bavarian locomotives and railbuses
