= Steindamm =

Steindamm (German: "stone dam", "stone levee") may refer to:

- Steindamm (Königsberg), a neighborhood in Königsberg (now Kaliningrad)
- Steindamm (Hamburg), a major street in Hamburg, Germany (de:Steindamm)
- Steindamm, a station on the Wangerooge Island Railway, the East Frisian island of Wangerooge off the northwestern coast of Germany
