= Bavarian Pts 3/4 =

Bavarian Pts 3/4 DRG Class 99.13
Type and origin
- Builder: Krauss
- Build date: 1906, 1923
- Total produced: 4
Specifications
- Configuration
  - Whyte: 2-6-0T
  - German: K 34.8
- Gauge: 1,000 mm (3 ft 3 3/8 in)
- Leading dia.: 500 mm (19 5/8 in)
- Driver dia.: 800 mm (31 1/2 in)
- Length
  - Over beams: 6,650 mm (21 ft 9 3/4 in)
- Service weight: 27.7 t (27.3 long tons; 30.5 short tons)
- Fuel capacity: 500 kg (1,100 lb) coal
- Water cap.: 2.5 m^{3} (550 imp gal; 660 US gal)
- Boiler pressure: 12 kgf/cm^{2} (1,180 kPa; 171 lbf/in^{2})
- Heating surface
  - Firebox: 0.79 m^{2} (8.5 sq ft)
  - Evaporative: 36.65 m^{2} (394.5 sq ft)
- Superheater
  - Heating area: 9.20 m^{2} (99.0 sq ft)
- Cylinders: 2
- Cylinder size: 380 mm (14 15/16 in)
- Piston stroke: 340 mm (13 3/8 in)
- Valve gear: Walschaerts (Heusinger)
Performance figures
- Maximum speed: 30 km/h (19 mph)
Career
- Numbers: K.Bay.Sts.E.: 1101–1104; DRG: 99 131 – 99 133
- Retired: 1922–1931

The Bavarian Pts 3/4 2-6-0T steam locomotives of the Royal Bavarian State Railways (Königlich Bayerische Staatsbahn) were employed on the steam 'tramway' between Altötting and Neuötting. A total of four machines were built, nos. 1101, 1102 and 1103 in 1906 and no. 1104 not until the retirement of no. 1102 in 1922. They had a covered driving gear, a high boiler with water tanks located beneath it, gangways and a railing for the running plate. The engines carried 2.5 m^{3} (88 cu ft) of water and 0.5 tonnes (0.49 long tons; 0.55 short tons) of coal on board.

After the foundation of the Deutsche Reichsbahn the remaining three locomotives were taken over and grouped into DRG Class 99.13. They were given the numbers 99 131 - 99 133. The locos were only used as reserve engines after the closure of the route in 1930 and retired in 1931. Number 99 133 (ex no. 1104, factory no. 7986), however, found a new job on the Wallersdorf – Münchshöfen branch line where it worked from 1938 to the closure of the line in 1949. It was then scrapped.

== See also ==
- List of Bavarian locomotives and railbuses
- Bavarian branch lines
