= Hagen von Ortloff =

German television personality

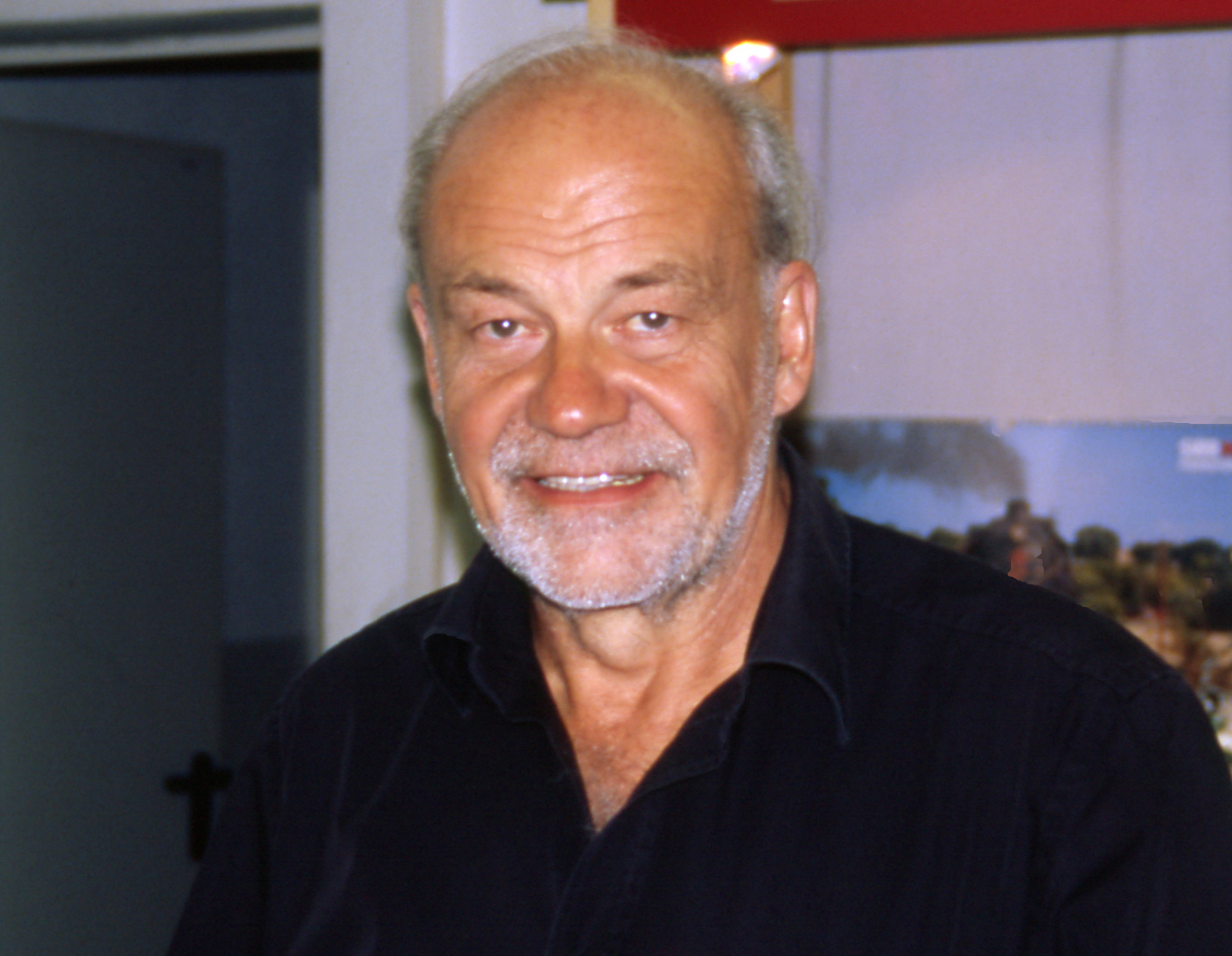
Hagen von Ortloff, 2010

Hagen von Ortloff (born May 1949, in Zwickau) is a German TV presenter. He is most famous for Eisenbahn-Romantik, a television programme about rail travel and railway history (specifically steam engines in Germany, Switzerland and Austria), produced by the television company SWR. Von Ortloff was the show's presenter and editor-in-chief for 25 years.

== Biography ==
After the death of his father in 1957, he spent his childhood with his grandmother in Dresden. In 1960, he moved to live with his mother in West Germany, near to Heilbronn. He attended the school Justinus-Kerner-Gymnasium in Weinsberg.

From 1972 to 1975, von Ortloff studied at the Fachhochschule für Druck in Stuttgart as an industrial engineer. Following this, he studied Sociology, Political Science and Management Economics at the University of Stuttgart, which he completed in 1984.

In 1977, he started working with the Süddeutschen Rundfunk broadcaster, and in 1991 the series Eisenbahn-Romantik first aired, which von Ortloff presented for 25 years. He retired as the presenter in 2016.
