= Oldenburg B =

Oldenburg B DRG Class 99.02
Numbering:	Nr. 3 DRG 99 021	Nr. 4–5; DRG 99 022–023
Quantity:	1	2
Manufacturer:	Freudenstein & Co	Hanomag
Years of manufacture:	1904	1910, 1913
Retirement:	1945 ?	1945 ?, 1957
Wheel arrangement:	0-4-0T	
Axle arrangement:	B n2t	
Type:	K 22.5	K 22.6
Rail gauge:	1,000 mm (3 ft 3 3/8 in)	
Length over buffers:	4,958 mm	5,350 mm
Height:	3,007 mm	3,015 mm
Axle load:	5.6 t	
Total wheelbase:	1,300 mm	1,400 mm
Empty weight:	9.4 t	
Service weight:	11.2 t	12.2 t
Adhesive weight:	11.2 t	12.2 t
Top speed:	40 km/h	30 km/h
Indicated Power:		74 kW
Driving wheeliameter:	800 mm	
Valve gear:	Allan	Walschaerts (Heusinger)
No. of cylinders:	2	
Cylinder bore:	185 mm	235 mm
Piston stroke:	300 mm	400 mm
Boiler overpressure:	12 bar	
No. of heating tubes:		70
Grate area:	0.39 m^{2}	0.45 m^{2}
Evaporative heating area:	17.60 m^{2}	21.10 m^{2}
Water capacity:	1.2 m³	1.0 m³
Fuel capacity:	0.35 t coal	
Locomotive brake:	Hand-operated screw brake	

The steam locomotives of Oldenburg Class B of the Grand Duchy of Oldenburg State Railways were built in the early 1900s for working the metre gauge network on the German island of Wangerooge.

Initially one example was ordered in 1904 from Freudenstein & Co. in Berlin. This tank engine weighed only 9.4 t when empty and could carry 1.2 m³ of water and 0.35 tonnes of coal. It had a well tank and the coal bunkers were on the left and right hand side of the boiler. The engine drove the second axle and the locomotive had the number 3.

In 1910 a somewhat heavier and larger locomotive was ordered from Hanomag. It weighed in at 12.2 tonnes (service weight). Because this engine acquitted itself well, in 1913 another one was ordered. These two locomotives were given numbers 4 and 5. After the formation of the Reichsbahn the engines were taken over, classified as DRG Class 99.02 and given the numbers 99 021–023. In 1942 locomotives 99 021 and 99 022 had to be handed over for wartime duties at the Eastern front where they disappeared without trace.

Number 99 023 remained on Wangerooge and underwent a minor rebuild. It was given larger water tanks, wooden window shutters and an electrically operated lantern. It was retired in 1957.

== See also ==
- Grand Duchy of Oldenburg State Railways
- List of Oldenburg locomotives and railbuses
- Länderbahnen
