= Eisenbahn-Romantik =

German television program

- Genre: Documentary
- Presented by: Hagen von Ortloff
- Opening theme: Les Brown − "Sentimental Journey"
- Country of origin: Germany
- No. of episodes: more than 1000

Production
- Running time: 30 minutes
- Production company: SWR

Original release
- Network: Südwest 3
- Release: 7 April 1991

Eisenbahn-Romantik (lit. 'railway romance') is a German television programme, broadcast by SWR. It portrays railway-related reports, whose content covers modern railway systems, museum railways and their facilities as well as items on model railway layouts worldwide. Politics and criticism is not left out; the series reports on closures, controversial model ideas, delays to reconstruction plans or smart commuter transport concepts. The broadcast has been presented since its inception by Hagen von Ortloff.

== History ==
The series began on 7 April 1991 on SDR as a filler between programmes on their regional TV channel, Südwest 3. Although the first broadcast was especially for railway fans, it was so well received by the public that the programme length was increased from half an hour to 45 minutes.

From 1994 Eisenbahn-Romantik had a fixed half-hour slot. Since autumn 2008 Eisenbahn-Romantik has been broadcast in alternating quarters with the SWR series Rasthaus (literally: "motorway restaurant"). During the winter and summer seasons, Eisenbahn-Romantik is shown weekly; in spring and autumn this slot is taken by Rasthaus.

After the merger of SDR and SWF into SWR in 1998, the whole editorial function were moved from Stuttgart to Baden-Baden.

Eisenbahn-Romantik is also broadcast on SR Fernsehen, NDR Fernsehen, hr-fernsehen, MDR Fernsehen and rbb Fernsehen. 3sat shows several programmes per week on an irregular basis. The average number of viewers is about one million.

== Production ==
As a rule the series are pre-recorded. The occasional special broadcast Lange Nacht der Eisenbahn-Romantik ("Long night of railway romance"), an extended version lasting several hours, is transmitted live. In addition to the usual presentation of short reports, Hagen von Ortloff talks to interesting railway fans and railway modellers in the studio.

The programmes are mainly recorded today by Jo Jung, who shared this task in earlier series with Peter Schurr.

Since the anniversary in December 2006 the programme has been produced and broadcast in 16:9 format.

== Themes ==
A selection of the themes covered to date is given below:

- Sauschwänzlebahn
- Glacier Express
- ' Zug der Wunder – von Nizza in die Seealpen- "The Wonder Train – Nice to the Maritime Alps"
- Eisenbahnausbesserungswerk – Railway repair depots
- Das Krokodil – the Crocodile locomotive
- Materialbahn – Goods lines in various countries e. g. in Canada or in the Eastern Bloc
- Miniatur Wunderland – the world's largest H0 model railway layout in the Speicherstadt at Hamburg
- The Kyoto Railway Museum
- The Schienenzeppelin and the MO187 model railway show in Bad Driburg
- Pontonbrücke – pontoon bridge at Speyer over the Rhine
- Salzkammergut-Lokalbahn – the branch line at Salzkammergut
- The Talyllyn Railway and the Welsh Highland Railway
- The Gotthard Line
- The show reports annually on the new railway models appearing at the Nuremberg International Toy Fair

== Title music and logo ==
The song "Sentimental Journey" by Les Brown is always played at the beginning of the broadcast and sometimes at the end during the credits. The steam locomotive 99 633, which is homed at Ochsenhausen today, has featured in the introduction since the first broadcast in 1991. In addition it appears in the programme logo.

== Eisenbahn-Romantik Club ==
For dedicated fans (including family members for a minimal surcharge) the Eisenbahn-Romantik-Club was founded. It has a magazine and a fan shop.

== Special rail journeys ==
On occasions, special railway trips – usually with historic trains and steam traction− are organised and run in Germany and abroad. The film material produced on these trips is then used in the following programme(s). Journeys lasting one or more days have been run, for example, to north of the Arctic Circle, to the motherland of all steam engines or through the French, Swiss, Italian and Austrian Alps as well as into neighbouring countries of the former Eastern Bloc.

== Similar programmes ==
A monthly programme, also half-an-hour long and along similar lines, but especially focussed on central Germany, is produced and broadcast by MDR under the title Bahnzeit.
