= DRG Class 99.21 =

German narrow-gauge steam locomotive

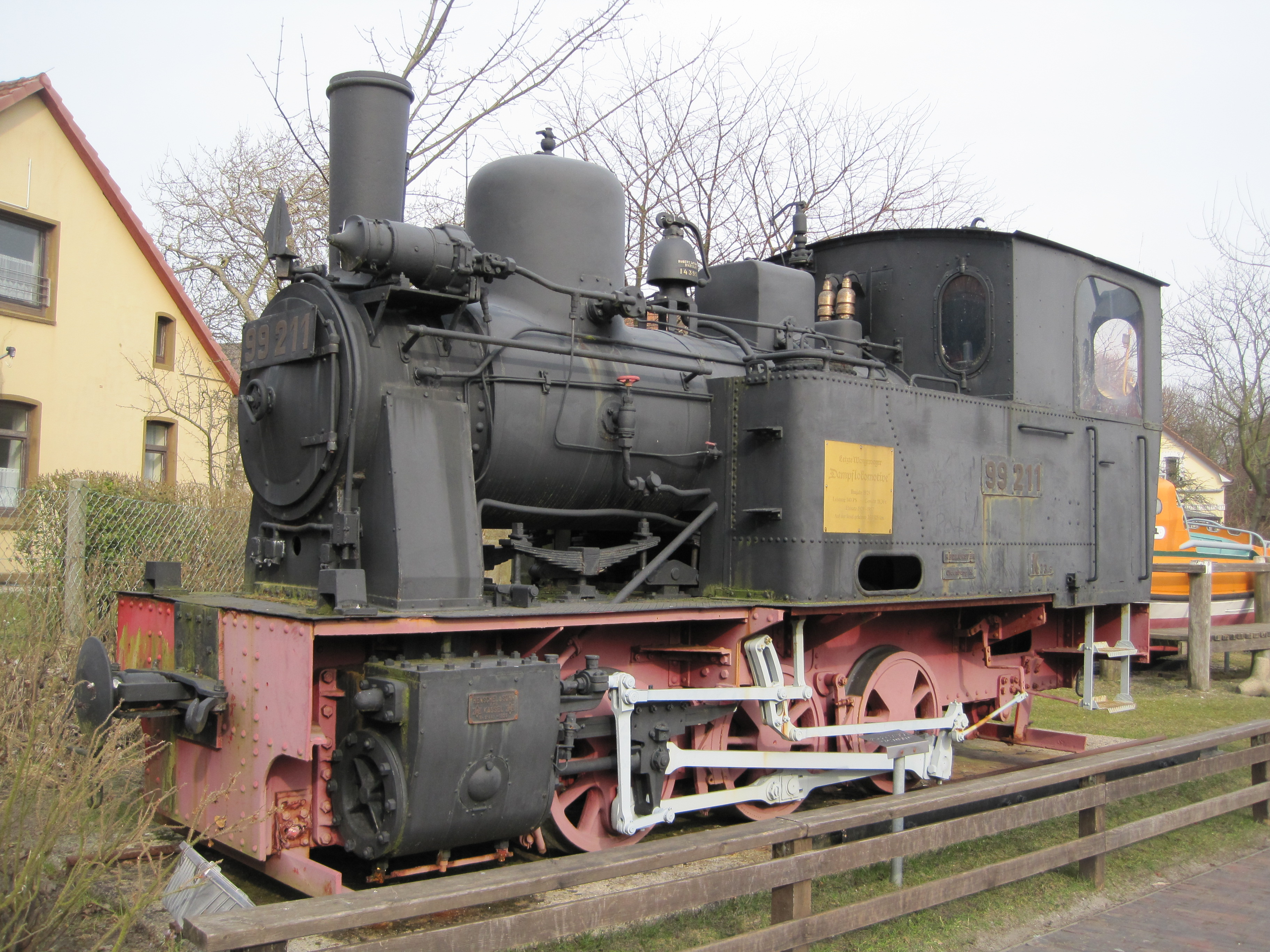
- The plinthed 99 211
Type and origin
- Power type: Steam
- Builder: Henschel & Sohn
- Serial number: 21442
- Build date: 1929
- Total produced: 1
Specifications
- Configuration
  - Whyte: 0-6-0T
  - UIC: C n2t
  - German: K 33.6
- Gauge: 1,000 mm (3 ft 3 3/8 in)
- Driver dia.: 800 mm (2 ft 7 1/2 in)
- Wheelbase
  - Axle spacing (Asymmetrical): 1,000 mm (3 ft 3 3/8 in) +; 1,000 mm (3 ft 3 3/8 in) =
  - Engine: 2,000 mm (6 ft 6 3/4 in)
- Length
  - Over headstocks: 5,500 mm (18 ft 1/2 in)
  - Over buffers: 6,400 mm (21 ft 0 in)
- Height: 3,200 mm (10 ft 6 in)
- Axle load: 6.1 tonnes (6.0 long tons; 6.7 short tons)
- Adhesive weight: 18.3 tonnes (18.0 long tons; 20.2 short tons)
- Empty weight: 14.8 tonnes (14.6 long tons; 16.3 short tons)
- Service weight: 18.3 tonnes (18.0 long tons; 20.2 short tons)
- Fuel type: Coal
- Fuel capacity: 600 kg (1,300 lb)
- Water cap.: 1.8 m^{3} (396 imp gal; 476 US gal)
- Firebox
  - Grate area: 0.60 m^{2} (6.5 sq ft)
- Boiler
  - Pitch: 1,850 mm (6 ft 7/8 in)
  - Tube plates: 2,550 mm (8 ft 4 3/8 in)
  - Small tubes: 41.5 mm (1 5/8 in), 90 off
- Boiler pressure: 14 bar (14.3 kgf/cm^{2}; 203 psi)
- Heating surface
  - Firebox: 2.66 m^{2} (28.6 sq ft)
  - Tubes: 26.40 m^{2} (284.2 sq ft)
  - Total surface: 29.06 m^{2} (312.8 sq ft)
- Cylinders: Two, outside
- Cylinder size: 310 mm × 400 mm (12 3/16 in × 15 3/4 in)
- Valve gear: Heusinger (Walschaerts)
- Train brakes: Knorr compressed air
- Parking brake: Counterweight brake
Performance figures
- Maximum speed: 40 km/h (25 mph)
- Indicated power: 140 PS (103 kW; 138 hp)
Career
- Numbers: 99 211
- Locale: Wangerooge
- Delivered: 1929
- Retired: 1960
- Disposition: Preserved, on static display

Built in 1929 by German locomotive builder Henschel & Son, the Deutsche Reichsbahn Class 99.21 was a unique narrow gauge 0-6-0T steam tank locomotive built for the Wangerooge Island Railway on Wangerooge, one of the German-owned Friesian islands in the North Sea.

== History ==
For hauling eight-wheeled passenger coaches a more powerful locomotive was needed. After the procurement of diesel locomotives in 1958 she remained for a time as a reserve engine. She carried number 99 211.

Today the locomotive is restored and is displayed as a monument on Wangerooge.

== Technical Details ==
The inner frame of the locomotive was also used as a water tank. She was designed as a saturated steam locomotive. The boiler had two shell rings and 90 heating tubes. The drive was achieved via a Walschaerts valve gear driving the third axle. The wheels on the centre axle were made without flanges to improve curve running.

The engine could hold 0.6 tonnes of coal in side tanks either side of the boiler, and 1.8 m^{3} of water in the frame and in an attachment to the coal bunker. The engine was first equipped with electric lighting in 1953.

== Gallery ==
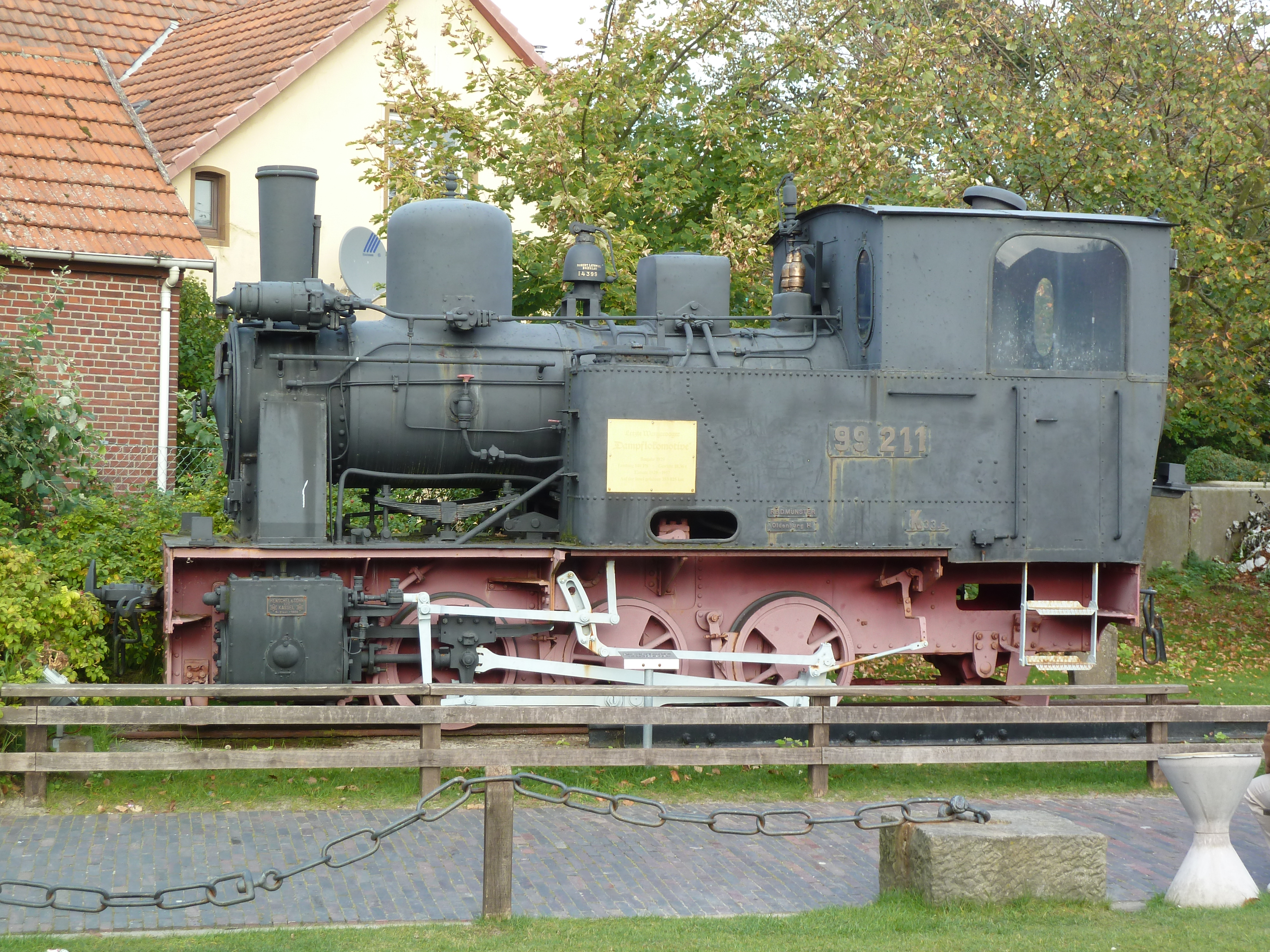
The preserved 99.211

== See also ==
- List of DRG locomotives and railbuses
