= Bavarian LE =

Bavarian LE DRG Class 99.07
Type and origin
- Builder: Krauss
- Build date: 1885–1900
- Total produced: 5
Specifications
- Configuration
  - Whyte: 0-6-0T
  - German: K 33.6
- Gauge: 1,000 mm (3 ft 3 3/8 in)
- Driver dia.: 800 mm (2 ft 7 1/2 in)
- Wheelbase
  - Overall: 1,800 mm (5 ft 10 3/4 in)
- Length
  - Over beams: 6,100 mm (20 ft 1/4 in)
- Height: 3,400 mm (11 ft 1 7/8 in)
- Adhesive weight: I and II: 16.30 t (16.04 long tons; 17.97 short tons); III: 16.96 t (16.69 long tons; 18.70 short tons); IV and V: 17.47 t (17.19 long tons; 19.26 short tons)
- Empty weight: I and II: 12.72 t (12.52 long tons; 14.02 short tons); III: 13.36 t (13.15 long tons; 14.73 short tons); IV and V: 13.67 t (13.45 long tons; 15.07 short tons)
- Service weight: I and II: 16.30 t (16.04 long tons; 17.97 short tons); III: 16.96 t (16.69 long tons; 18.70 short tons); IV and V: 17.47 t (17.19 long tons; 19.26 short tons)
- Fuel capacity: 650 kg (1,430 lb) coal
- Water cap.: III: 1.77 m^{3} (390 imp gal; 470 US gal)
- Boiler
- No. of heating tubes: 105 (except III: 107)
- Boiler pressure: 12 kg/cm^{2} (1,180 kPa; 171 lbf/in^{2})
- Heating surface
  - Firebox: 0.53 m^{2} (5.7 sq ft)
  - Radiative: 2.63 m^{2} (28.3 sq ft)
  - Tubes: I and II: 29.03 m^{2} (312.5 sq ft); III to V: 29.58 m^{2} (318.4 sq ft)
  - Evaporative: I and II: 31.66 m^{2} (340.8 sq ft); III to V: 32.20 m^{2} (346.6 sq ft)
- Cylinders: 2
- Cylinder size: 260 mm (10 1/4 in)
- Piston stroke: 400 mm (15 3/4 in)
- Valve gear: Allan
- Train brakes: III: Schmid continuous brake; IV and V: Hardy vacuum brake; from 1908: Westinghouse compressed-air brake
Performance figures
- Maximum speed: 30 km/h (19 mph)
- Indicated power: 100 PS (74 kW; 99 hp)
Career
- Numbers: K.Bay.Sts.E: I to V; DRG: 99 071 to 99 075
- Retired: 1935

The steam locomotives of Bavarian Class LE were narrow gauge engines with the Royal Bavarian State Railways (Königlich Bayerische Staats-Eisenbahnen).

== History ==
The engines were manufactured for the metre gauge route between Eichstätt-Stadt and Eichstätt-Bahnhof. In 1885 the railway procured two units and, in 1892, a third. After the 5.2 kilometre long line was extended from Eichstätt by 30 kilometres, two more engines were added in 1898 and 1900. The machines carried railway numbers I - V.

The Deutsche Reichsbahn took over all five engines in 1925 as Class 99.07 with numbers 99 071–99 075. The first two locomotives were retired by 1932, the remaining three in 1935, after the whole route was converted to standard gauge.

== Technical Features ==
The engines were of a design by Krauss that, in similar dimensions, was used for other classes, include some for the Felda Railway, later the Prussian T 31, and designated by the factory as XXXV.

The locomotives had a box frame with a water tank. The short boiler barrel comprised two boiler rings. On top of the boiler were the steam dome, two spring-balance, safety valves and a sand dome. The flat valves were operated by an Allan valve gear, the connecting rod worked the third axle. On the first locomotives the driving gear was also covered, but these were removed around 1908. The coal bunkers were located in front of the driver's cab. The engines carried up to 1.77 m^{3} of water and 0.65 tonnes of coal.

The air pump for the compressed-air brake was positioned at the front right, next to the smokebox, the air reservoirs were on the right and left of the boiler and the silencer was fixed to the chimney.

== See also ==
- Royal Bavarian State Railways
- List of Bavarian locomotives and railbuses
