= Württemberg Ts 4 =

Württemberg Ts 4 DRG Class 99.17
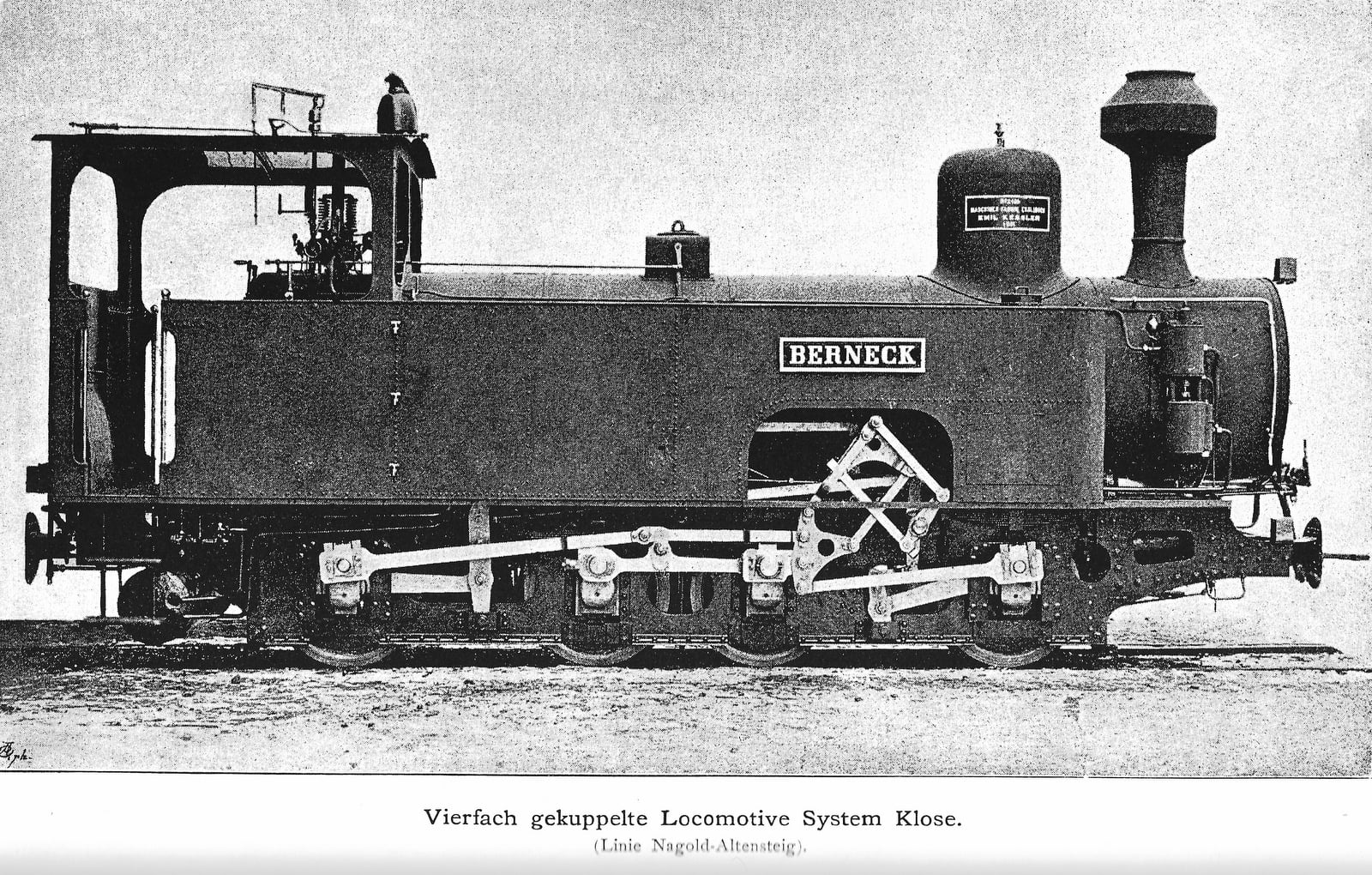
Type and origin
- Builder: Maschinenfabrik Esslingen
- Build date: 1891, 1899
- Total produced: 3
Specifications
  - German: K 44.8
- Gauge: 1,000 mm (3 ft 3 3/8 in)
- Driver dia.: 900 mm (2 ft 11 3/8 in)
- Wheelbase
  - Overall: 2,250 mm (7 ft 4 1/2 in)
- Length
  - Over beams: 8,130 mm (26 ft 8 in)
- Width: 2,200 mm (7 ft 2 5/8 in)
- Height: 3,540 mm (11 ft 7 3/8 in)
- Adhesive weight: 29.80 tonnes (29.33 long tons; 32.85 short tons)
- Empty weight: 23.65 tonnes (23.28 long tons; 26.07 short tons)
- Service weight: 29.80 tonnes (29.33 long tons; 32.85 short tons)
- Fuel capacity: 750 kg (1,650 lb)
- Water cap.: 2.4 m^{3} (530 imp gal; 630 US gal)
- Boiler pressure: 12 kg/cm^{2} (1,180 kPa; 171 psi)
- Heating surface
  - Firebox: 1.02 m^{2} (11.0 sq ft)
  - Evaporative: 70.2 m^{2} (756 sq ft)
- Cylinders: 2
- Cylinder size: 340 mm (13 3/8 in)
- Piston stroke: 500 mm (19 11/16 in)
- Valve gear: Klose
Performance figures
- Maximum speed: 30 km/h (19 mph)
Career
- Numbers: Nr. 1–3; 99 171–173
- Retired: 1931

The DRG Class 99.17, formerly the Württemberg Ts 4 of the Royal Württemberg State Railways were German narrow gauge steam locomotives bought for working the 15.11 kilometre long route between the towns of Altensteig and Nagold. The three tank locomotives had an outer frame and a Klose drive. The first and third axles were steered by the third, radially-sliding axle by means of a system of levers. The second axle was driven by the inside cylinder and had no wheel flanges. Overall the system was very reliable, but nevertheless also very maintenance-intensive.

The engines were delivered in 1891, 1892 and 1899, and later all taken over by the Reichsbahn. There they were given numbers 99 171–99 173. They also had the names Altensteig, Berneck and Ebhausen

== See also ==
- Royal Württemberg State Railways
- List of Württemberg locomotives and railbuses
