= Palatine L 1 =

Palatine L 1 Palatine Pts 3/3 N DRG Class 99.08–09
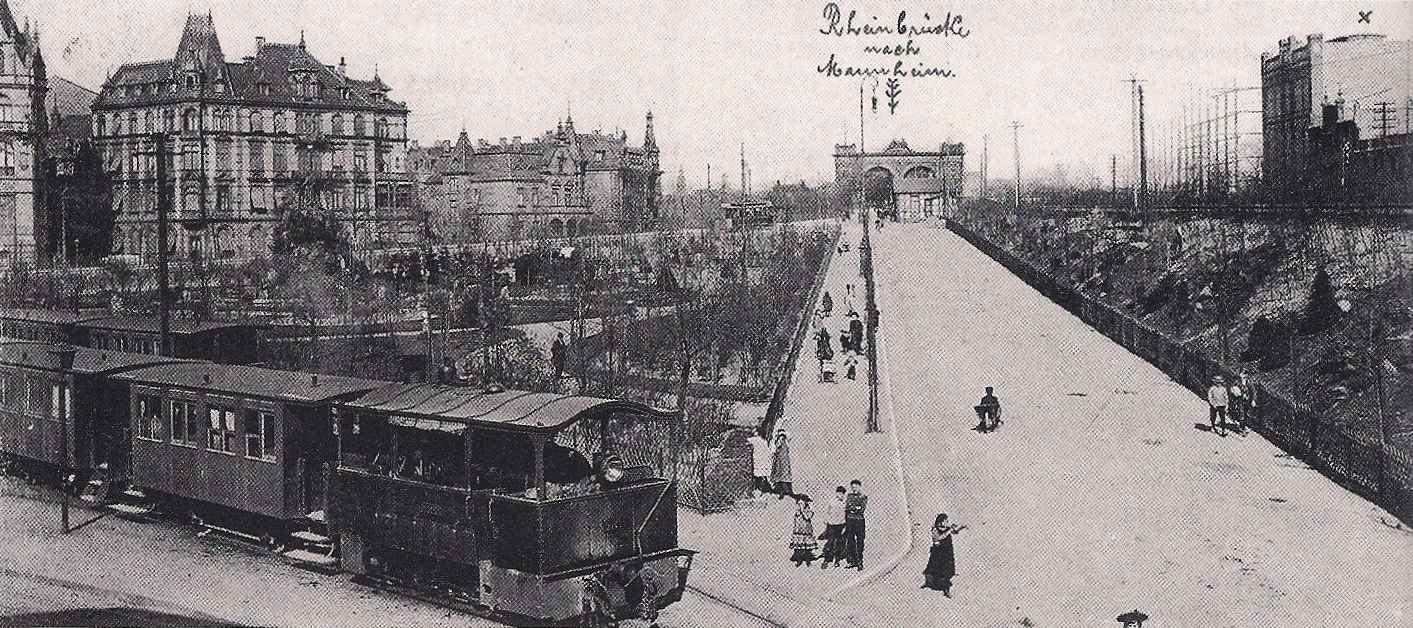
- Locomotive XIV FRISENHEIM in 1900
Type and origin
- Power type: Steam
- Builder: Krauss
- Serial number: 2082–2088, 2448–2450, 4213–4214, 5758, 6403
- Build date: 1889–1911
- Total produced: 14
Specifications
- Configuration
  - Whyte: 0-6-0T
  - UIC: C n2t
  - German: K 33.8
- Gauge: 1,000 mm (3 ft 3 3/8 in)
- Driver dia.: 845 mm (2 ft 9 1/4 in)
- Wheelbase
  - Engine: 1,800 mm (5 ft 10 3/4 in)
- Length
  - Over buffers: 6,000 mm (19 ft 8 1/4 in)
- Height: 3,650 mm (11 ft 11 3/4 in)
- Axle load: 7.6 t (7.5 long tons; 8.4 short tons); 7.8 t (7.7 long tons; 8.6 short tons)*
- Adhesive weight: 22.7 t (22.3 long tons; 25.0 short tons); 23.4 t (23.0 long tons; 25.8 short tons)*
- Service weight: 22.7 t (22.3 long tons; 25.0 short tons); 23.4 t (23.0 long tons; 25.8 short tons)*
- Fuel type: Coal
- Fuel capacity: 1,100 kg (2,400 lb)
- Water cap.: 2.1 m^{3} (460 imp gal; 550 US gal); 1.9 m^{3} (420 imp gal; 500 US gal) *
- Firebox
  - Grate area: 0.85 m^{2} (9.1 sq ft)
- Boiler
  - Tube plates: 2,600 mm (8 ft 6 1/4 in)
  - Small tubes: 44 mm (1 3/4 in), 129 off
- Boiler pressure: 12 bar (12.2 kg/cm^{2}; 174 lbf/in^{2})
- Heating surface
  - Firebox: 3.70 m^{2} (39.8 sq ft); 3.59 m^{2} (38.6 sq ft) *
  - Tubes: 40.05 m^{2} (431.1 sq ft)
  - Total surface: 43.75 m^{2} (470.9 sq ft); 43.64 m^{2} (469.7 sq ft) *
- Cylinders: 2
- Cylinder size: 320 mm × 350 mm (12 5/8 in × 13 3/4 in)
- Valve gear: Allan
- Train brakes: Westinghouse compressed-air brake
Performance figures
- Maximum speed: 30 km/h (19 mph)
Career
- Numbers: Pfalz: XI–XXII, XXVIII–XXIX DRG: 99 081 – 99 093
- Retired: 1957
- * Values for XXVIII and XXIX

The narrow gauge steam locomotives of Palatine L 1 and Pts 3/3 N of the Palatinate Railway were procured for lines in the area of Ludwigshafen, Neustadt an der Weinstrasse and Speyer (the Neustadt-Speyer Lokalbahn or branch line). On the formation of the Reichsbahn the engines were given the running numbers 99 081 to 99 093.

== Procurement ==
The first seven locomotives from 1889 were given the railway numbers XI to XVII. Further deliveries followed in 1891 (XVIII - XX) and 1899 (XXI and XII). In 1907 and 1910 there was a follow-on order for two, largely identical engines. These were given numbers XXVIII and XXIX. The latte was designated as Class Pts 3/3 N in accordance with the Bavarian numbering scheme following the 1909 take over of the Palatine railways by the Royal Bavarian State Railways. All engines delivered up to 1907 were also given a name.

== Duties ==
Class L 1 locomotives were assigned to the depots at Ludwigshafen and Neustadt-Haardt. Their sphere of operations was in Anterior Palatinate (Vorderpfalz) on the routes from Ludwigshafen to Dannstadt and to Grosskarlbach. The last two engines were deployed on the Neustadt and Haardt railway to Geinsheim which opened in 1908.

== Fate ==
Locomotive no. XX Laumersheim was lost during the First World War. All the others were taken over by the Reichsbahn. The first locomotives were retired in 1930/31; the remainder between 1948 and 1957. There were three locomotives still in service after the Second World War in the French Zone of Occupation: Nos. 99 086, 99 087 and 99 091. In addition Nos. 99 092 and 99 093 of the follow-on series were also left on duty in the same area. In 1939, number 99 081 went to the Wangerooge Island Railway and was retired there on 12 August 1952. The last locomotive still in service was 99 093 which was finally withdrawn on 10 August 1957.

== Design ==
Because the lines ran on or alongside roads it was decided to design the locomotives as tramway or 'box' locomotives (Kastenlokomotive). They had a fully glazed, box body and the drive was covered to reduce the risk to passers-by or horses. In order to enable the engine driver to see the line there was a sliding side window. The driver himself stood to one side next to the boiler. The water tank was integrated into the rivetted plate frame. The filling points were on the front wall the left and right of the smokebox. Coal was stored behind the outer firebox on the footplate. As a result, the engines could only be laboriously coaled using baskets.

The saturated steam drive was on the outside and had slide valves. The cylinders were set horizontally and drove the third coupled axle. The running gear was supported at three points. The first and second coupled axle were supported on common carrying springs and the third on a transverse leaf spring.

The boiler barrel was rivetted and comprised two sections. The steam dome sat on top of the second section.

Initially a Hardy vacuum brake was installed; this was later replaced by a Westinghouse compressed-air brake. The sander was hand-operated and sanded the second and third axles. The engines also had a Latowski steam-operated bell and, later, a steam turbo generator was fitted over the smokebox door outside the locomotive body to provide electric lighting.

== See also ==
- Royal Bavarian State Railways
- Palatinate Railway
- List of Bavarian locomotives and railbuses
- List of Palatine locomotives and railbuses

== Literature ==
- Schnabel, Heinz (1987). Eisenbahn-Fahrzeug-Archiv Band 2.5: Lokomotiven bayerischer Eisenbahnen (in German). Düsseldorf: Alba Publikation Alf Teloeken GmbH + Co KG. pp. 298–299, 301–302, 391. ISBN 3-87094-105-7.
- Schnabel, Heinz (1992). Deutsches Lok-Archiv: Lokomotiven bayrischer Eisenbahnen (in German). Berlin: transpress. ISBN 3-344-70717-5.
- Weisbrod, Manfred; Petznik, Wolfgang (1981). Dampflokomotiven deutscher Eisenbahnen, Baureihe 97–99 (EFA 1.4) (in German) (2nd ed.). Düsseldorf: Alba. pp. 110–112. ISBN 3-87094-087-5.
- Weisbrod, Manfred; Wiegard, Hans; Müller, Hans; Petznick, Wolfgang (1995). Deutsches Lok-Archiv: Dampflokomotiven 4 (Baureihe 99) (in German). Berlin: transpress. ISBN 3-344-70903-8.
