= Mosbach–Mudau Nos. 1 to 4 =

Mosbach–Mudau Nos. 1 to 4 Baden C DRG Class 99.720
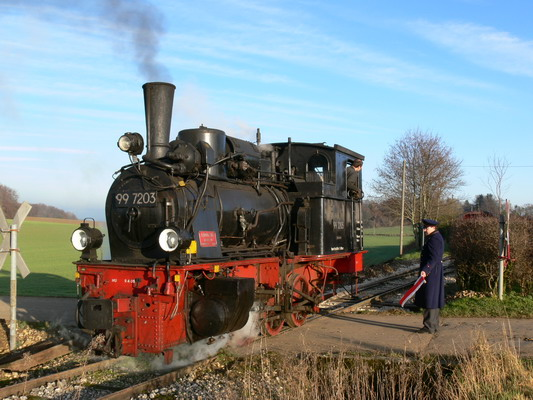
- 99 7203 in December 2006
Type and origin
- Builder: Borsig
- Serial number: 5324–5327
- Build date: 1904
- Total produced: 4
Specifications
- Configuration
  - Whyte: 0-6-0T
  - UIC: C n2t
- Gauge: 1,000 mm (3 ft 3 3/8 in) metre gauge
- Driver dia.: 900 mm (35 3/8 in)
- Length
  - Over couplers: 7,060 mm (23 ft 2 in)
- Width: 2,260 mm (7 ft 5 in)
- Height: 3,600 mm (11 ft 9 3/4 in)
- Axle load: 7.7 t (7.6 long tons; 8.5 short tons)
- Empty weight: 18.0 t (17.7 long tons; 19.8 short tons)
- Service weight: 23.0 t (22.6 long tons; 25.4 short tons)
- Fuel capacity: 0.95 t (0.93 long tons; 1.05 short tons) coal
- Water cap.: 2.40 m^{3} (530 imp gal; 630 US gal)
- Firebox
  - Grate area: 0.77 m^{2} (8.3 sq ft)
- Boiler
  - Pitch: 1,850 mm (6 ft 7/8 in)
  - Tube plates: 2,865 mm (9 ft 4 3/4 in)
  - Small tubes: 38 mm (1 1/2 in), 129 off
- Boiler pressure: 12.0 bar (1.20 MPa; 12.2 kgf/cm^{2}; 174 psi)
- Heating surface
  - Firebox: 4.03 m^{2} (43.4 sq ft)
  - Tubes: 43.12 m^{2} (464.1 sq ft)
  - Total surface: 47.15 m^{2} (507.5 sq ft)
- Cylinders: Two, outside
- Cylinder size: 320 mm × 420 mm (12 5/8 in × 16 9/16 in)
- Valve gear: Allan
- Train brakes: Körting vacuum brake, later Westinghouse compressed-air brake
- Couplers: Equalising lever coupler
Performance figures
- Maximum speed: 30 km/h (19 mph)
- Indicated power: 160 PS (158 hp; 118 kW)
Career
- Numbers: 1–4; DRG 99 7201–7204
- Retired: 1964–1965

The Mosbach–Mudau engines Nos. 1 to 4 (or Baden C) were six-wheeled, narrow gauge, tank locomotives designed for the metre gauge line from Mosbach to Mudau.

== History ==
The four locomotives were built in 1904 by the firm of Borsig. The frame was designed as a water tank. Due to the steep inclines it had a large boiler, the boiler barrel consisting of two shells.

It had an Allan valve gear with trick valves. The connecting rods drove the third coupled wheels. The loco had an Exter counterweight brake for the engine and a Körting vacuum brake for the train. This was probably replaced in 1926 by a Westinghouse compressed-air brake. When the Deutsche Reichsbahn took over the operational running of the state-owned by privately operated line from the Deutsche Eisenbahn-Betriebsgesellschaft, a subsidiary of the firm of Vering & Waechter who had built the line, these engines were incorporated into their fleet as numbers 99 7201 to 99 7204. In 1964/1965 the steam locomotives were retired and replaced by Class V 52 diesel locomotives. Until then they had managed all the traffic, no other locomotives were even employed in a temporary role.

== Preserved ==
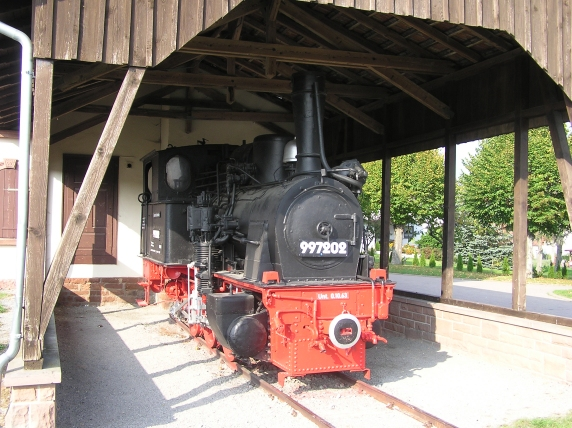
99 7202 as a monument at the former terminus of Mudau

All the locomotives have been preserved until the present day.

- 99 7201 stood for a long time as a monument near Passau, before being acquired in 2007 by the Hirzbergbahn.
- 99 7202 is a monument at Mudau station.
- 99 7203 was used by the Albtalbahn from 1964 to 1966 for maintenance of way duties. It then went to the Karlsruhe gasworks and, later the Viernheim narrow gauge museum. Finally it ended up with the Ulmer Eisenbahnfreunde and has been in museum railway service since 1990 on the Amstetten–Oppingen line.
- 99 7204 (formerly No. 4) was bought from a timber factory in Oberbernbach and stored on an industrial site at Oberbernbach in Bavaria for a long time before being transferred in 1999 to the Märkische Museum Railway in Herscheid. In 2014 it was sold to a private individual in the Netherlands who planned to restore it.

== See also ==
- Grand Duchy of Baden State Railway
- List of Baden locomotives and railbuses
