= Wangerooge Island Railway =

Narrow-gauge railway in Germany

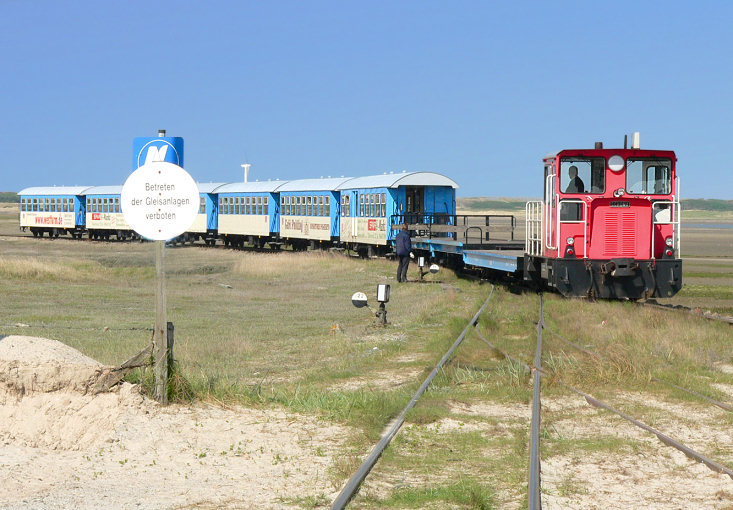
- Island railway near the West Pier

Overview
- Line number: 1542 (Wangerooge West Pier); 1543 (Saline–Westen); 1545 (Wangerooge East Pier)

Service
- Route number: 10007

Technical
- Line length: 5.9 km (3.7 mi)
- Track gauge: 1,000 mm (3 ft 3 3/8 in)
- Operating speed: 20 km/h (12 mph)

The single track Wangerooge Island Railway (Wangerooger Inselbahn) is an unelectrified narrow gauge railway with a track gauge of 1,000 mm (3 ft 3 3/8 in) located on the East Frisian island of Wangerooge off the northwestern coast of Germany. It is the most important means of transport on the island and is the only narrow gauge railway operated today by the Deutsche Bahn.

== History ==
=== From 1897 to 1920 ===
The Wangerooge Island Railway was opened in 1897 with its present-day track gauge of 1,000 mm (3 ft 3 3/8 in). Its operator was the Grand Duchy of Oldenburg State Railways (Großherzoglich Oldenburgische Eisenbahn or GOE). It was worked from the outset by steam locomotives, and not as a horse-drawn railway as on several neighbouring islands. The line led from the newly built pier in the southwest of the island to the middle of the island village, or Inseldorf, in the centre of the island. A train needed about 20 minutes to negotiate the 3.5 kilometre long route at a top speed of 30 km/h. These timings are still valid today, even though the route has been changed several times.

In 1901 a 1.9 kilometre long stub line was built from the Saline, the half-way point on the route towards the western part of the island in order to link the military base there.

In 1905 a second pier, the East Pier or Ostanleger, was erected and a 5.4 kilometre long rail link built from there to the Inseldorf. In order to handle the growing stream of traffic, in 1906 a new, large station was built on the southern edge of the village and a station hall built over the two tracks; the station has remained largely unchanged to the present day.

In 1912 a new West Pier, a little to the east of the old one, was opened. It was connected to the junction at Saline by a new track running roughly parallel to the old one. The old pier was taken out of service and its associated track was lifted. The purpose of this measure was the development of Wangerooge as a military fortification served by a capable railway network. During the course of World War I numerous branches were laid to military installations. As a result, on this small island there were four sections of the island railway with as many as 24 branches.

=== 1920 to 1945 ===
In 1920 the island railway transferred to the ownership of the Deutsche Reichsbahn (DRG) as the state railways were merged into the new national railway administration.

The DRG grouped the steam locomotives into Class 99, a collective class for all narrow gauge steam engines. In the mid-1920s a wye was built at Saline that again was mainly for military reasons such as the rapid movement of guns. This triangular track was relaid several times and finally lifted in 1969. Also in the middle of the 1920s, the first eight-wheeled passenger coaches were bought and a "coffee train" ran twice weekly from the village station to Westen station and back.

The number of holidaymakers (and thus passengers) fell to a low level around 1930, but had risen again by 1939 almost sixfold to 65,500, of which two thirds arrived at the East Pier.

From 1939 to 1952 a tramway or 'box' locomotive (Kastenlokomotive), number 99 081, ran on Wangerooge, and was nicknamed Treibhaus ('boiler house') by the crews due to the amount of heat generated in the driver's cab.

During the Second World War Wangerooge was again of great strategic importance, because the island was located near the estuary of the river Weser and the militarily strategic town of Wilhelmshaven. On 25 April 1945 there was a major air attack on Wangerooge with heavy bombing which destroyed the line between Saline and the village, the station hall and many passenger and goods wagons.

=== 1945 to present ===
After the end of the war the destroyed section was rebuilt. In 1952 the Deutsche Bundesbahn, now in charge of railway operations, introduced diesel locomotives, the first one being a Gmeinder locomotive, and by 1957 the change of traction was completed. In 1955 a small, bus-like draisine had been procured.

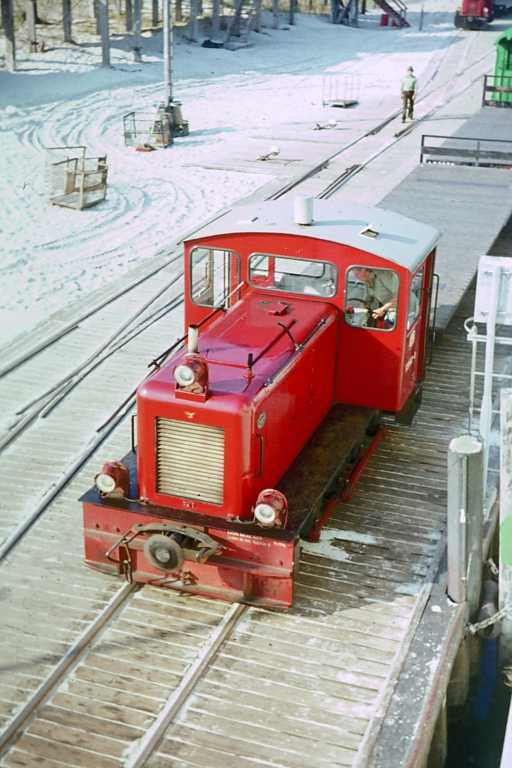
329 502 in 1983 at a Wangerooge pier

After the Second World War, the number of passengers arriving at the East Pier and using the eastern section of the island railway was very high. The reason for this was that the popular holiday island of Heligoland was still occupied by the British. After 1952, when Heligoland became accessible to Germans again, traffic at the East Pier fell sharply. In 1958 it was dismantled along with the eastern section of the railway. Today there are still about 200m of tracks heading eastwards which are used as sidings.

In 1959 eight-wheeled passenger coaches were delivered to Wangerooge as the result of the post-war coach-rebuilding programme; These very much resembled the standard rebuild coaches (or Umbau-Wagen) very common at that time. They initially sported a dark green livery, but in 1972 were painted with advertising.

Between 1952 and 1971 four DB Class 329 diesel locomotives were procured and, in 1977, the draisine was replaced by a newer model. In 1981 a Class 699 railbus and several wagons were added; they had previously worked the island railway on the neighbouring island of Spiekeroog until its closure.

In 1990 two more diesel locomotives were bought, this time from the former Mansfeld-Kombinat in East Germany. In the years that followed 14 new passenger coaches from Reichsbahn repair shop (Raw) Wittenberge were added, which were painted in light blue and white, similar to the colour scheme of Interregio trains, and the existing coaches were completely replaced.

On 1 January 1992, two years before the formation of the Deutsche Bahn (DB AG), the Class 329 locomotives were regrouped into Class 399.1. In 1995/96 the tracks were fully renewed.

From 1997 for several years there were museum steam trips on Wangerooge every summer hauled by a Franzburg locomotive from the Deutscher Eisenbahn-Verein which was brought across from the mainland for that purpose.

In 1999 the DB AG procured two new diesels from Schöma (399 107 and 108) that have been used ever since to haul passenger trains. As a result, the four oldest diesel locomotives (399 101–104) could be withdrawn and the use of the damage-prone Romanian engines (399 105 und 106) could be reduced.

== Current operations ==
The Wangerooge Island Railway is the only narrow gauge railway operated by the Deutsche Bahn today. Since 2002 it has belonged to the DB AutoZug business area, so short-distance excursion offers, like the 'Have a great weekend ticket' (Schönes-Wochenende-Ticket) are not valid. There is a standard fare charged for a journey by ferry and rail to the island and large items of luggage must be handed in. There is also an on-island fare. There is no other transport on the island worthy of the name. The railway is used by about 200,000 visitors annually and, on peak days, 1,500 passengers travel each way.

The tracks on the main route run on a ballast bed, built between 1995 and 2005 as part of the refurbishment of the line, whilst the secondary tracks still have sand and gravel trackbeds. The top speed is still only 20 km/h. Part of the line between the (West) Pier and Saline runs through salt beds that flood at high water. This area is also a breeding ground for many sea birds that have become used to the railway traffic.

Because the DB ferries from Harlesiel have to sail through an area of mud flats, the timetable is dependent on the tide. However the timetable for the whole period is calculated in advance.

From the youth hostel of Westturm there is a good all-round view of the whole route and in the high season you can see a lot of activity. For example, there are often two trains underway at the same time, which cross one another immediately in front of the pier. There are also services via Saline to Westen as required, but these are not open to the general public and mainly serve the schools field centre there. The majority of trains also haul eight-wheeled flat wagons for the transportation of luggage. The suitcases and bags that are handed in are transported in roll containers on the flats, as are bicycles. Food and all sorts of other goods to supply the island's needs are also carried. Furniture and other removal items are usually carried on the flats in small containers. These are cross-loaded to trailers with fork-lift trucks and delivered to the owners using electric vans. There are also several eight-wheeled, open wagons.

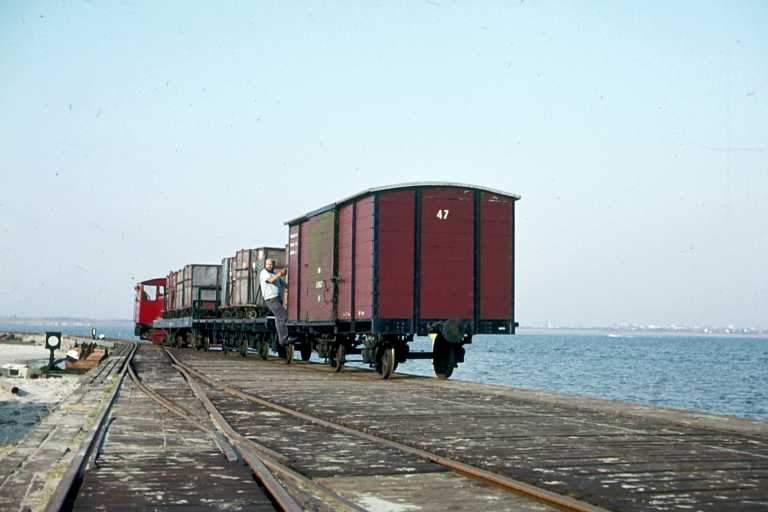
Goods train on the Wangerooge Island Railway

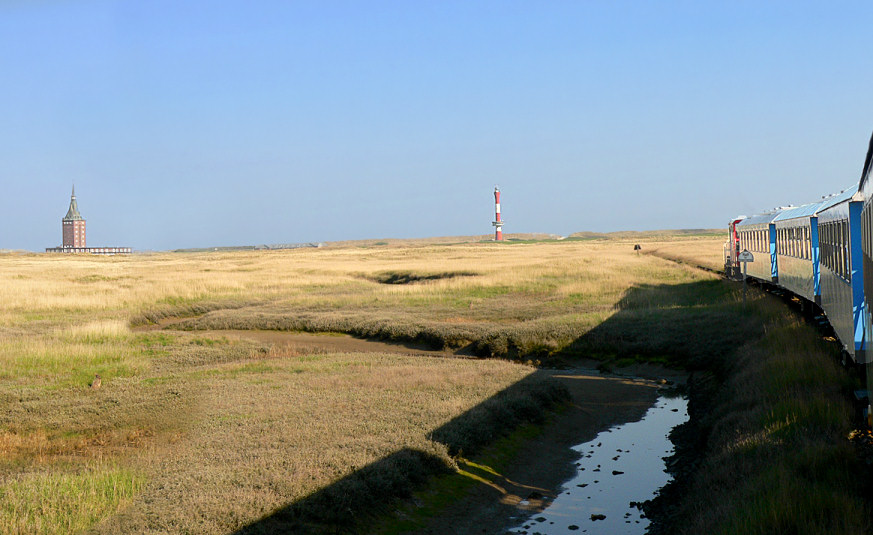
Line to Inseldorf

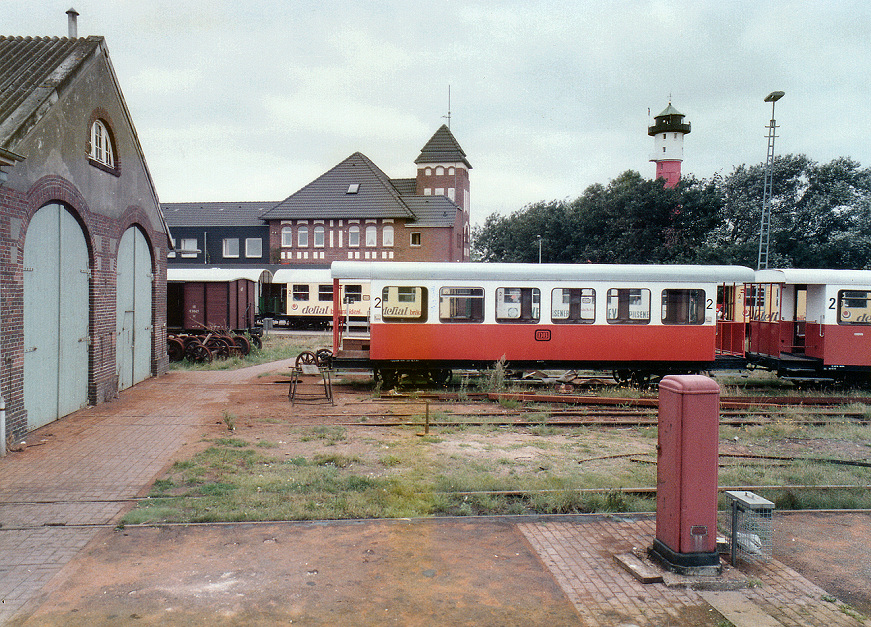
Station and locomotive shed in 1984

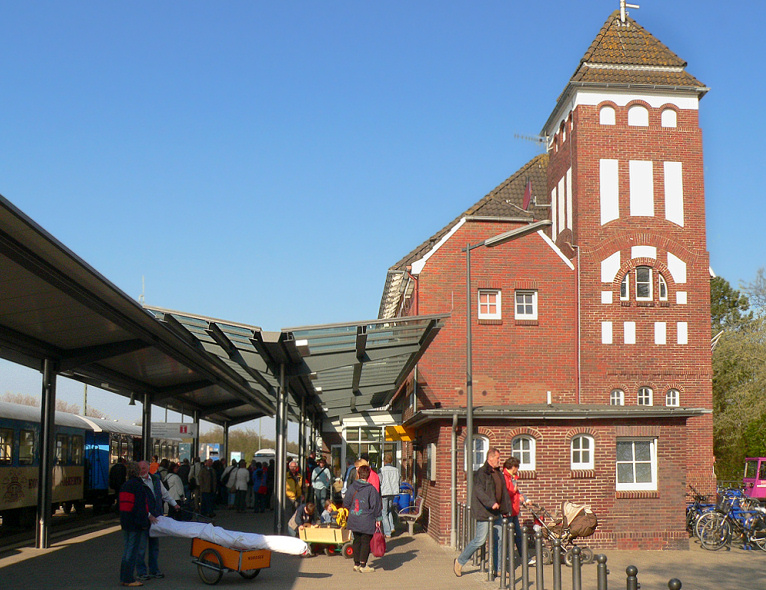
Station at Inseldorf

== Future ==
The Wangerooge Island Railway is the main means of transport on the island and is likely to remain so for a long time yet. Unlike the neighbouring islands, the ferry ports at Wangerooge cannot be sited nearer the island's village. The rolling stock is in good condition, the line has been modernised and most of the ferry passengers use the railway, not least because of the lack of alternatives. Air services only handle a small proportion of the visitors.

== Locomotives and wagons ==
In over 100 years of its existence, the Wangerooge Island Railway has owned 11 steam locomotives, 8 diesel locomotives, a railbus and two draisines. In addition there were vehicles for Nazi Germany's Kriegsmarine that, up to 1945, had its own railway stock on Wangerooge, including a locomotive and draisine belonging to the Waterway and Shipping Office (neither of which has survived). In addition, there were four- and eight-wheeled tankers, open wagons, covered vans and flatbeds.

The steam locomotive 99 211 has been preserved as a monument on Wangerooge.

== See also ==
- Grand Duchy of Oldenburg State Railways
- List of Oldenburg locomotives and railcars
- List of DRG locomotives and railcars
- List of DB locomotives and railcars
- East Frisian Islands: Wangerooge, Spiekeroog, Langeoog, Borkum
