= Kinding =

- Municipality
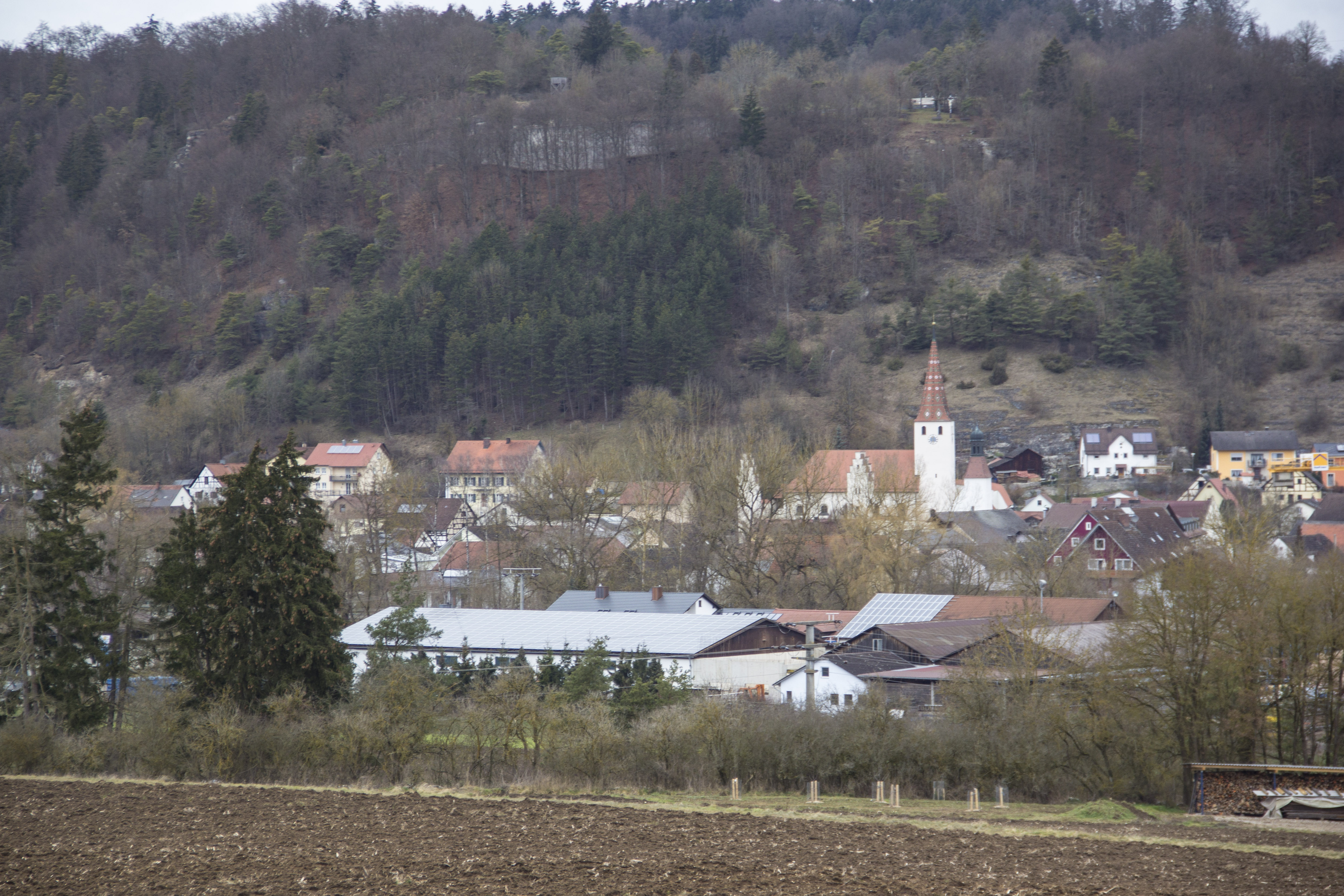
- Kinding, view from south

- Coat of arms

- Location of Kinding within Eichstätt district
- Interactive map of Kinding
- Location within Germany Location within Bavaria
- Coordinates: 49°0′N 11°22′E
- Country: Germany
- State: Bavaria
- Admin. region: Oberbayern
- District: Eichstätt
- Subdivisions: 17 Ortsteile

Government
  - Mayor (2020–26): Rita Böhm (CSU)

Area
  - Total: 51.7 km^{2} (20.0 sq mi)
- Elevation: 378 m (1,240 ft)

Population (2025-12-31)
  - Total: 2,600
  - Density: 50/km^{2} (130/sq mi)
- Time zone: UTC+01:00 (CET)
  - Summer (DST): UTC+02:00 (CEST)
- Postal codes: 85125
- Dialling codes: 08467
- Vehicle registration: EI
- Website: www.kinding.de

Kinding (German pronunciation: [ˈkɪndɪŋ]) is a municipality in the district of Eichstätt in Bavaria in Germany.
