= Württemberg Tssd =

Württemberg Tssd Class 99.63
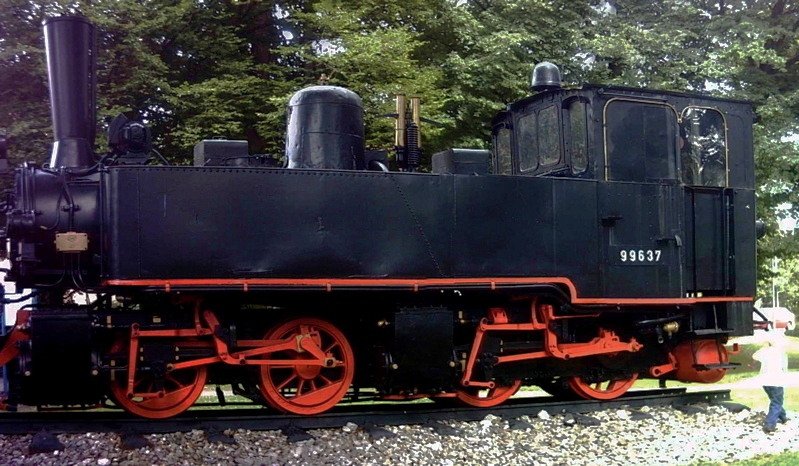
Type and origin
- Builder: Maschinenfabrik Esslingen
- Build date: 1899, 1901, 1904
- Total produced: 9
Specifications
- Configuration
  - Whyte: 0-4-4-0T
  - German: K 44.7
- Gauge: 750 mm (2 ft 5 1/2 in)
- Driver dia.: 900 mm (35 3/8 in)
- Wheelbase
  - Bogie: 1,350 mm (4 ft 5 1/4 in)
  - Overall: 4,400 mm (14 ft 5 1/4 in)
- Length
  - Over beams: 8,226 mm (26 ft 11 3/4 in)
- Width: 2,500 mm (8 ft 2 7/16 in)
- Height: 3,650 mm (11 ft 11 11/16 in)
- Adhesive weight: 28.70 t (28.25 long tons; 31.64 short tons)
- Empty weight: 21.80 t (21.46 long tons; 24.03 short tons)
- Service weight: 28.70 t (28.25 long tons; 31.64 short tons)
- Fuel capacity: 1.0 t (2,200 lb) of coal
- Water cap.: Nos. 41–46: 2.50 m^{3} (550 imp gal; 660 US gal); Nos. 47–49: 3.00 m^{3} (660 imp gal; 790 US gal)
- Boiler pressure: 12 kg/cm^{2} (1.18 MPa; 171 psi)
- Heating surface
  - Firebox: 0.97 m^{2} (10.4 sq ft)
  - Evaporative: 56.38 m^{2} (606.9 sq ft)
- Cylinders: 4
- High-pressure cylinder: 275 mm (10 13/16 in)
- Low-pressure cylinder: 420 mm (16 9/16 in)
- Piston stroke: 500 mm (19 11/16 in)
- Valve gear: Walschaerts (Heusinger)
- Train brakes: Westinghouse with supplementary brake
Performance figures
- Maximum speed: 30 km/h (19 mph)
Career
- Numbers: KWSE: 41 – 49; DRG: 99 631 – 99 639
- Retired: by 1969
- * Nos. 47–49

The Württemberg Tssd was a class of German 0-4-4-0T narrow gauge, steam locomotive operated by the Royal Württemberg State Railways.

== History ==
They were initially deployed on the Öchsle Railway in 1899 between Biberach an der Riß and Ochsenhausen. In addition they worked the Federsee Railway between Schussenried and Riedlingen, the Zabergäu Railway between Lauffen am Neckar and Leonbronn and the Bottwar Railway between Marbach am Neckar and Heilbronn Süd. A total of nine units were delivered in three series of three engines in 1899, 1901 and 1904 with fleet numbers 41–49. They were initially classified as Tss locomotives and later as Tssd 41–49.

T is the abbreviation for tank locomotive, ss means that it is a narrow gauge locomotive with a rail gauge of 750 mm (2 ft 5 1/2 in), and the letter d, added later, was the abbreviation for duplex locomotive, because the steam was expanded twice, first in the high-pressure cylinders and then in the low-pressure cylinders. Today duplex locomotives are described as compound locomotives.

The engines carried 2.5 m^{3} (550 imp gal; 660 US gal) of water (the third series had larger water tanks with a 3.0 m^{3} (660 imp gal; 790 US gal) capacity) and 1.0 tonne (2,200 lb) of coal. The maximal train load was 140 tonnes (140 long tons; 150 short tons) on an incline of 1 in 40 (2.5%).

All the engines were taken over by Deutsche Reichsbahn-Gesellschaft and given the numbers 99 631 to 99 639. After the Second World War four engines were still in service. They were retired as follows:

- Number 99 638 – 26 October 1954
- Number 99 639 – 27 November 1956
- Number 99 637 – 25 March 1965
- Number 99 633 – 18 March 1969

== Preserved locomotives ==
Two locomotives, numbers 99 633 and 99 637 have been preserved.

Locomotive 99 633 was under the ownership of the German Railway History Company (DGEG) and was loaned to the Öchsle Schmalspurbahn (Öchsle Narrow-Gauge Railway) and displayed in the Ochsenhausen shed, its original home. In 2007 the society bought it outright. Since the very first transmission of the SWR television programme, Eisenbahn-Romantik, it has featured in the introduction and the programme's logo.

Number 99 637 is on display as a monument at the former station forecourt in Bad Buchau, its last home station.

== See also ==
- Royal Württemberg State Railways
- List of Württemberg locomotives and railbuses
