= Adolf Klose =

German engineer and businessman (1844-1923)

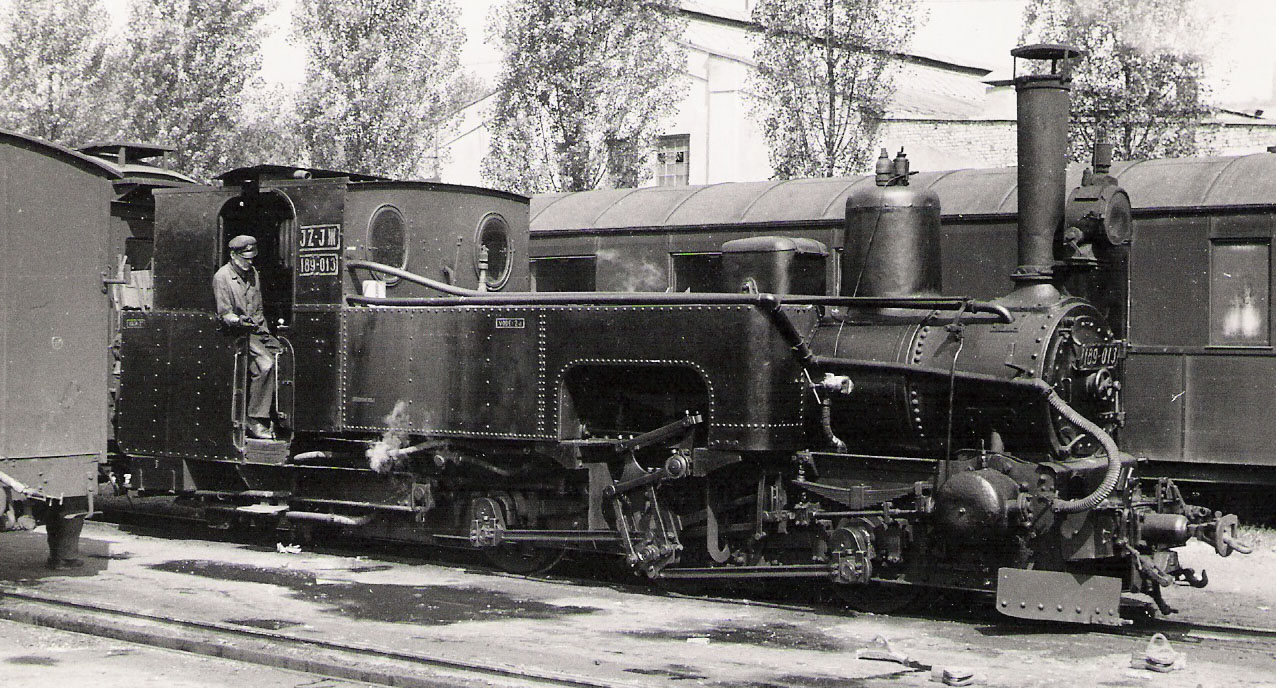
The Klose drive was widely used on Yugoslavia's narrow gauge railways.

Adolf Klose (21 May 1844 – 2 September 1923) was the chief engineer of the Royal Württemberg State Railways in southern Germany from June 1885 to 1896.

Klose was born in Bernstadt auf dem Eigen, in Saxony. Before his taking up his post in Stuttgart he had been the technical inspector of the United Swiss Railways (Vereinigten Schweizerbahnen). After a period of depending on Prussian prototypes between 1865 and 1885, a new engineering direction followed under Klose's time in office. It was stamped by numerous home-grown ideas and discoveries. In particular he promoted the introduction of compound working for steam locomotives in Württemberg.

The patented Klose steering (Klose-Lenkwerk) carries his name. This was a multipartite and complex device for steam locomotives, which controlled the radial setting of leading and trailing wheelsets in order to improve curve running. Unfortunately, its costly maintenance and tendency to develop faults meant that his invention had no lasting success, something which was true of many other of his devices.

In 1906, Rudolf Diesel, Adolf Klose and the steam and diesel engine manufacturer Gebrüder Sulzer founded Gesellschaft für Thermolokomotiven, Diesel-Klose-Sulzer GmbH for the manufacture of diesel-powered locomotives. The company produced one diesel-mechanical locomotive for the Prussian State Railways in 1912.

Adolf Klose died on 2 September 1923 in Munich, Bavaria.

== Literature ==
- Mühl/Seidel: Die Württembergischen Staatseisenbahnen. Konrad Theiss Verlag Stuttgart und Aalen, 1970
