= DRG locomotive types =

Table of locomotive types
Letters	Locomotive type (German)	Locomotive type (English)	Classes
S	Schnellzuglokomotive	Express train locomotive	01 to 19
P	Personenzuglokomotive	Passenger train locomotive	20 to 39
G	Güterzuglokomotive	Goods train locomotive	40 to 59
St	Schnellzugtenderlok	Fast train tank locomotive	60 to 79
Pt	Personenzugtenderlok	Passenger train tank locomotive	60 to 79
Gt	Güterzugtenderlok	Goods train tank locomotive	80 to 96
Z	Zahnradlokomotive	Cog locomotive	97
L	Lokalbahnlokomotive	Branch line locomotive	98
K	Schmalspurlokomotiven	Narrow gauge locomotive	99

The locomotive type (Gattungszeichen) of a German steam locomotive was a secondary classification system introduced after 1924 by the Deutsche Reichsbahn-Gesellschaft (DRG) and comprised four parts:

1. A letter from the adjacent table, that specified the type of locomotive (express train engine, passenger train locomotive, etc.).
2. A number, usually two-digit, the first digit indicating the number of coupled axles and the second the total number of axles on the locomotive. Tender axles were not included.
3. The permitted axle load in tonnes was given next, after a full stop separating it from the preceding axle information.
4. If parts of the locomotive exceeded the loading gauge, this was indicated with a triangle over the axle load (see photo below right). If this was simply a removable chimney fitting, this was indicated with an additional bar above the point of the triangle (photo below left).

Example: A DRG Class 01 express train locomotive had the following type classification: S36.20. That meant: Express train locomotive (Schnellzuglokomotive) with 3 coupled axles, a total of 6 axles and an axle load of 20 tonnes

It was intended to use this type classification system for electric locomotives as well. But because electric locomotives could be used for any duty, this plan was given up.

The primary classification system was based on class numbers which, in the case of steam locomotives ran from 01-99 (see table, right hand column).

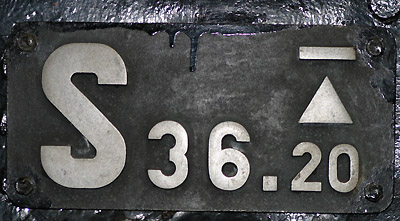
Type plate on a DRG Class 01 steam locomotive

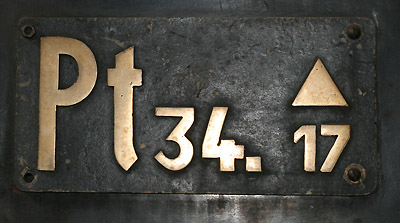
Type plate on a DRG Class 74 (ex-Prussian T 12) steam locomotive

== Literature ==
- K-E. Maedel/ A. Gottwald: Deutsche Dampflokomotiven, Transpressverlag, ISBN 3-344-70912-7
- Harald Vogelsang: Die Fahrzeuge und Anlagen des Eisenbahnmuseums Bochum-Dahlhausen, ISBN 3-921700-99-X

== See also ==
- History of rail transport in Germany
- Deutsche Reichsbahn
- Deutsche Reichsbahn-Gesellschaft
