= Narrow-gauge railways in Saxony =

Railway network in Saxony

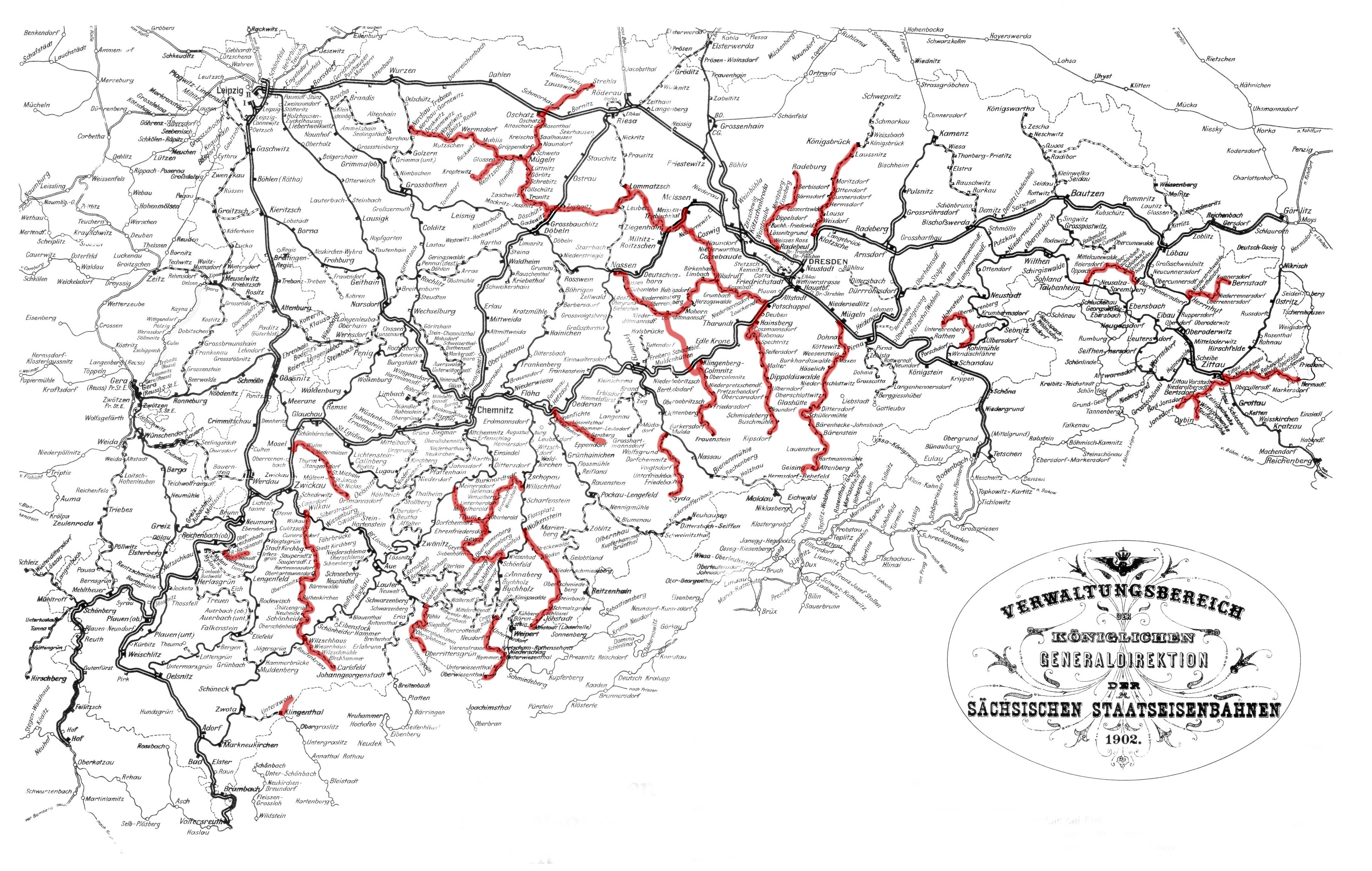
Narrow-gauge railways in Saxony

The narrow-gauge railways in Saxony were once the largest single-operator narrow-gauge railway network in Germany. In Saxony, the network peaked shortly after World War I with over 500 km (311 mi) of tracks. At first, it was primarily created to connect the small towns and villages in Saxony – which had formed a viable industry in the 19th century – to already established standard-gauge railways. But even shortly after 1900, some of the railways would become important for tourism in the area.

== History ==
=== Beginnings ===
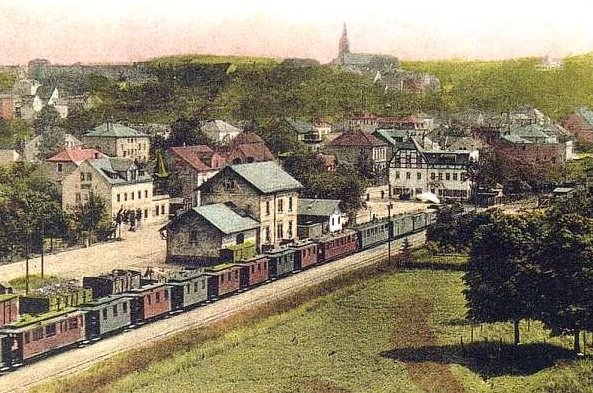
The Dohna station of the Müglitz Valley Railway

Around 1875, the Royal Saxon State railway network, unlike other states in Germany, had already expanded to cover most of the territory of Saxony. Due to the mountainous terrain, any further expansion was met with a disproportional cost increase. In order to keep costs down, most new track projects were then planned and executed as branch lines, with smaller radii for curves, simpler operating rules and unsupervised stations and yards as the primary means to save costs. However, to connect the small towns and villages in the deep and narrow Ore Mountain valleys with their diverse industry, standard-gauge tracks were only feasible with an enormous amount of technical and financial investment. Therefore, the directorate of the Royal Saxon State Railways, given the example of the existing Bröl Valley Railway and Upper Silesian Railway, decided in favor of narrow-gauge railways.

The first narrow-gauge railway in Saxony opened in 1881 between Wilkau-Haßlau and Kirchberg. In addition, the Weißeritztalbahn and the Mügeln railway network were already under construction. Many additional narrow-gauge railways, such as the Thumer Netz, were built in short order, almost all of them using a standardized 750 mm (2 ft 5 1/2 in) track gauge. In the meantime, standard-gauge projects in Saxony were scaled back to tracks that connected already existing standard-gauge railways, or where the transfer of goods between the standard and narrow tracks was not feasible or profitable.

=== Expansion before World War I ===
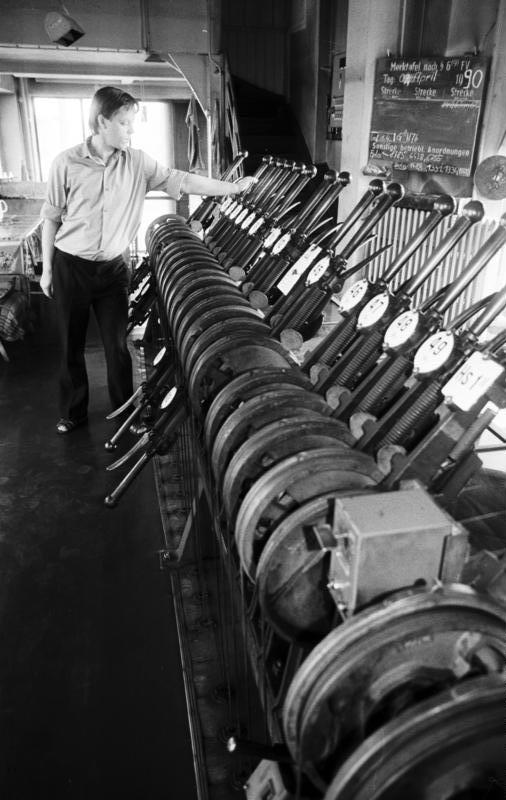
Switch tower in Zittau

Within 20 years, the Saxon narrow-gauge railway network had almost reached its final size. After 1900, only few additional railways were added. Most were just additions to existing lines that brought operational advantages.

Although the narrow-gauge network made very little profit, it was very important for the industrial development of Saxony. Without the narrow-gauge tracks – that permitted industrial sidings to small companies in narrow and steep valleys – an industrial development in the poor Ore Mountain area of Saxony would have hardly been possible.

However, it was soon evident that the narrow-gauge railways were not always up to task for all cargo demands. Mainly, the transloading of freight between the breaks of gauge was time-consuming and expensive. To avoid additional cargo handling on the Dresden-Klotzsche–Königsbrück line, a container system was tested ("Umsetzkästen") in which the whole cargo box of a freight car was transferred between standard and narrow-gauge frames. Since this railway was converted to standard gauge shortly after, the tests were abandoned. Instead, rollbock traffic was now favored. However, it was soon evident that piggy-backing standard-gauge freight cars onto the narrow-gauge tracks did not meet the initial goals of operating the narrow-gauge railways on a very small budget: The railways needed large investments to reinforce the tracks, increase the structure gauge to accommodate a larger loading gauge and to acquire stronger steam locomotives.

=== Between world wars ===
Rail network expansion came to a halt on the outbreak of World War I; only projects on which work had already begun, such as the extension of Müglitz Valley Railway and the Klingenberg-Colmnitz–Oberdittmannsdorf Railway, were completed. The Pöbel Valley Railway was stopped, and later abandoned altogether.

In the 1920s, most Saxon narrow-gauge railways experienced a first crisis. Even though cargo and passenger traffic was up, the cost exceeded the operational income. Reason was foremost the 1920s German inflation as well as higher cost for the personnel. In addition, the Reichspost had started a bus service, which for marginally higher cost was faster and hence was drawing passengers away from the railway. The Deutsche Reichsbahn tried to counter that trend with more modern passenger cars, higher-powered locomotives and more trains. Some railways were planned to be converted to standard gauge, but only the Müglitz Valley Railway was converted in 1938. In the 1930s, a few of the railways were scheduled to end their service, but this did not happen until much later.

Starting in 1928, there were a large number of technical and equipment upgrades. The rail network acquired higher capacity, four-axle bogie passenger cars with steam heating and electrical lighting, which brought passenger comfort up to par with standard gauge. Vacuum brakes and Scharfenberg couplers were introduced across the board, and superheated locomotives like the Saxon VI K were brought into service.

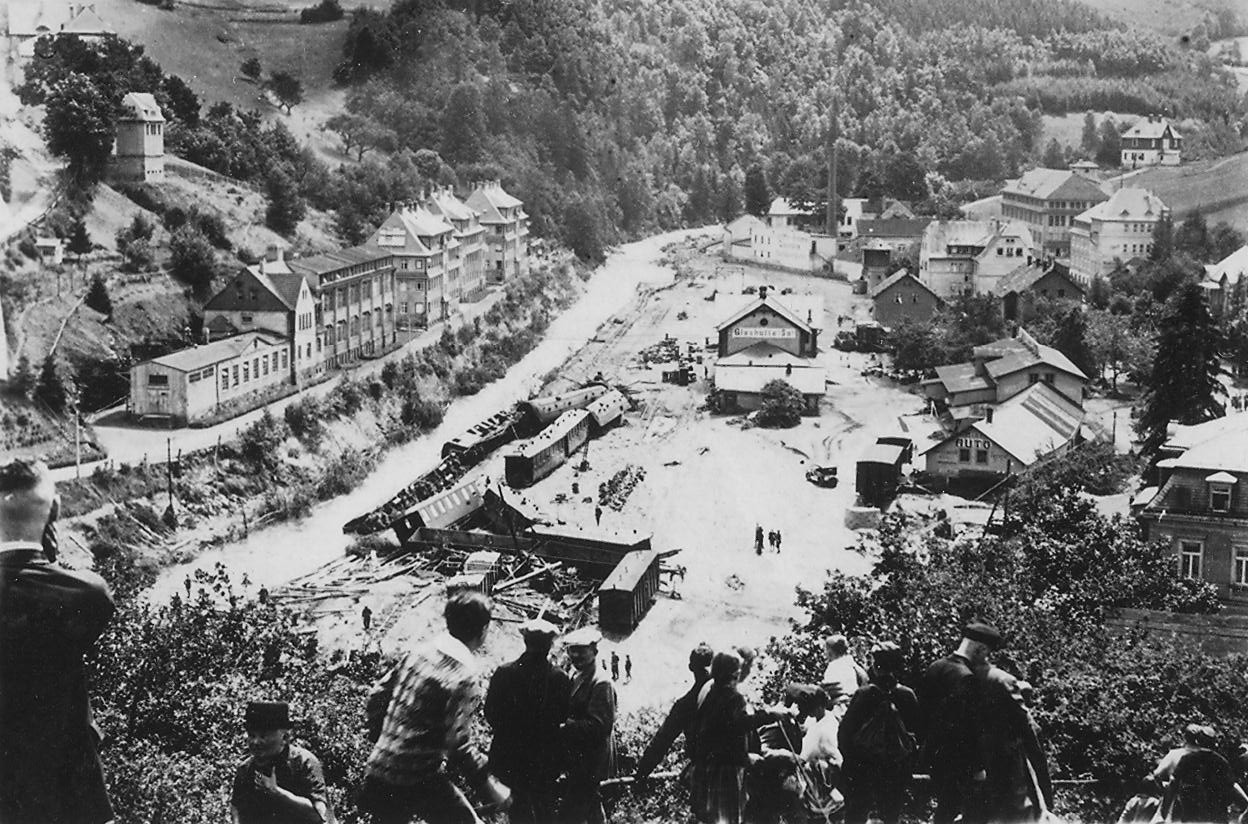
Flood damage in Glashütte

A severe flood in July 1927 affected many of the railways in Saxony, especially the Müglitz Valley Railway tracks, which were destroyed to a large degree. They were rebuilt soon afterwards.

In the 1930s, more improvements were made to the railways. Modern signal towers were built for the Zittau–Oybin–Jonsdorf railway and the Weißeritztalbahn. The Kipsdorf and Oberwiesenthal stations were rebuilt and extended; the Weißeritztalbahn and the Fichtelberg Railway could now accommodate over-length trains with up to 56 axles.

Technical development stagnated during World War II. More and more personnel was drafted into the Wehrmacht, and the railways were maintained less and less. At the same time, the cargo volume rose in support of the war effort. The railways were not directly affected by military action, but with the fronts drawing near in April and May 1945, the railways ceased operations.

=== After World War II ===
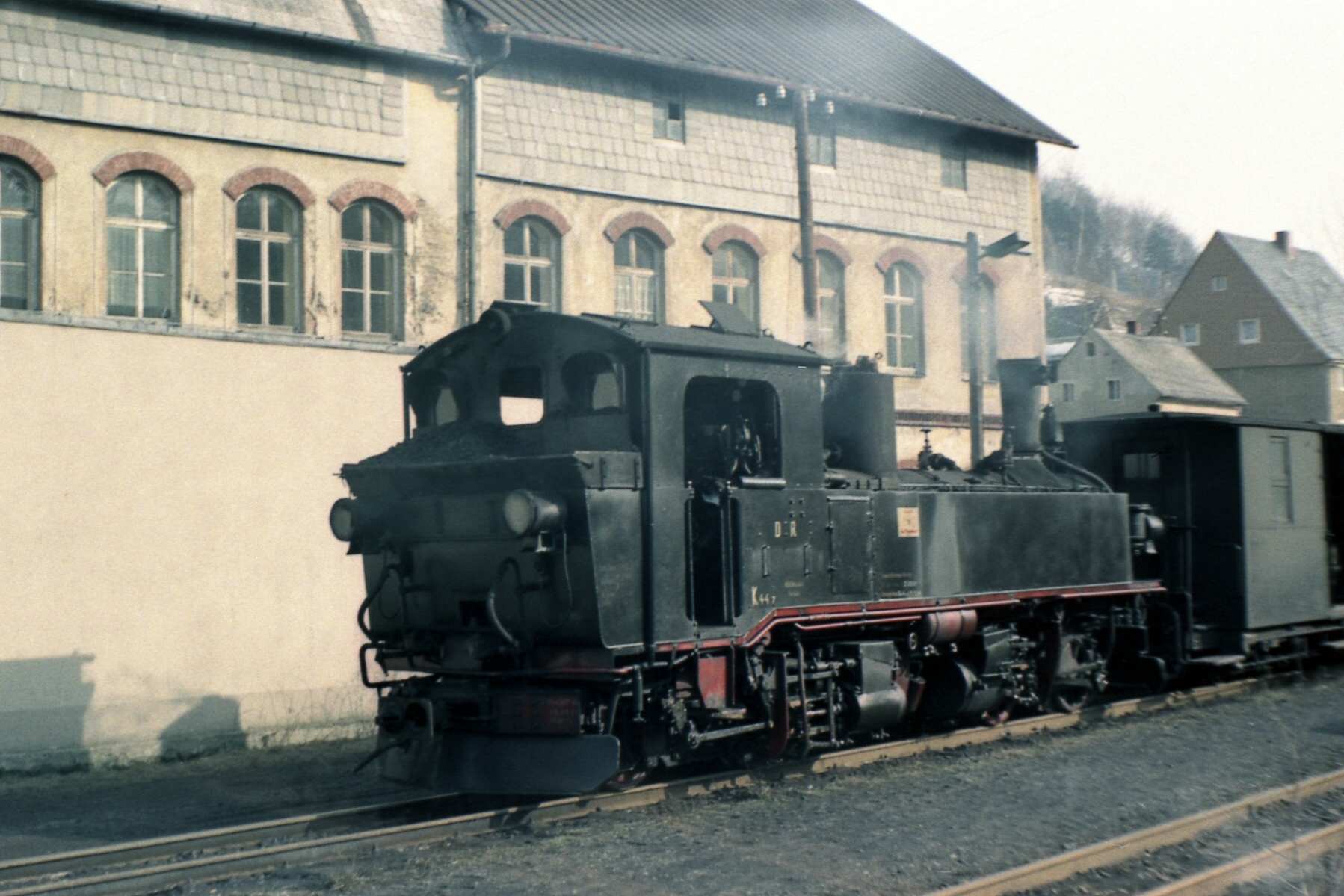
Steam locomotive 99 561 of the Pressnitz Valley Railway in Niederschmiedeberg

After the unconditional surrender of Germany on 8 May 1945, operations of the Saxon narrow-gauge railways started back up in relative short time. Problems were primarily caused by the relatively desolate condition of the rolling stock, which was compounded by the largely destroyed Ausbesserungswerk in Chemnitz no longer being in a position to repair narrow-gauge locomotives. As an example, this caused service of the Schwarzbach Railway to be interrupted whenever the only operational locomotive was in need of repair. This situation grew worse as part of the more modern and powerful rolling stock had to be surrendered to the Soviet Union as war reparations. Two railways in Upper Lusatia, the Herrnhut–Bernstadt Railway and the Taubenheim–Dürrhennersdorf Railway, were completely dismantled in 1945 and – as war reparations – shipped east. In addition, traffic increased enormously for some railways in the Ore Mountains when the SDAG Wismut started mining uranium and thousands of miners required transportation on shift change.

Overall, the transport volume was still well below the levels of the 1930s, because of the lack of locomotives. In May 1947, 467 out of a total of 521 passenger cars were parked and not needed. This only changed after the new Neubaulokomotive DR Class 99.77-79 was put into service in 1953, and the transport volume reached the 1930s levels again. It would not last long, as history repeated itself when newly created bus services again drew passengers from the railway. Trucks did the same for the cargo volume.

=== Service termination in the 1960s ===
With the beginning of the 1960s, the situation for the narrow-gauge railways grew worse. Due to lack of maintenance since World War II, most tracks were in a dire state of repair, as only small sections of the tracks had been rebuilt on the more important railways. In addition, a part of the rolling stock, especially the Saxon IV K locomotives, were then at the end of their service life. Due to a lack of alternatives, the Ausbesserungswerk in Görlitz started the reconstruction (literally) of the Saxon IV K and Saxon VI K locomotives.

However, a fundamental decision of the fate of the narrow-gauge railways had to be made. In 1963 and 1964, the government of East Germany conducted an efficiency study. This study found that only if a complete overhaul of the tracks and rolling stock were to take place would it make sense to keep the narrow-gauge railways operational. It concluded that due to a lack of resources to rebuild the tracks and lack of capacity to construct and build new diesel locomotives, the closing of the narrow-gauge railways was not just a technical, but primarily an economic requirement. On 14 May 1964 the Ministerrat decided that all narrow-gauge railways of East Germany were to cease operations by 1975. This shutdown program first started relatively slowly, since neither buses nor trucks were available in the required quantities.

The first railways were shut down in 1966 and 1967, with some of the last train runs having country fair character. By 1970, protests started against the shutdown of the Bimmelbahn railways, with the result that no or only very short official notice was given when a rail section was shut down and there were no more celebrations. Partly due to the protests, in 1974 a decision was made to keep a total of seven narrow-gauge railways in East Germany as tourist and heritage railways. For Saxony, they were:

- Fichtelberg Railway: Cranzahl–Oberwiesenthal
- Radebeul–Radeburg railway: Radebeul-East–Moritzburg–Radeburg
- Weißeritztalbahn: Freital-Hainsberg–Kipsdorf
- Zittauer railway: Zittau–Oybin/Jonsdorf

=== Development since 1975 ===
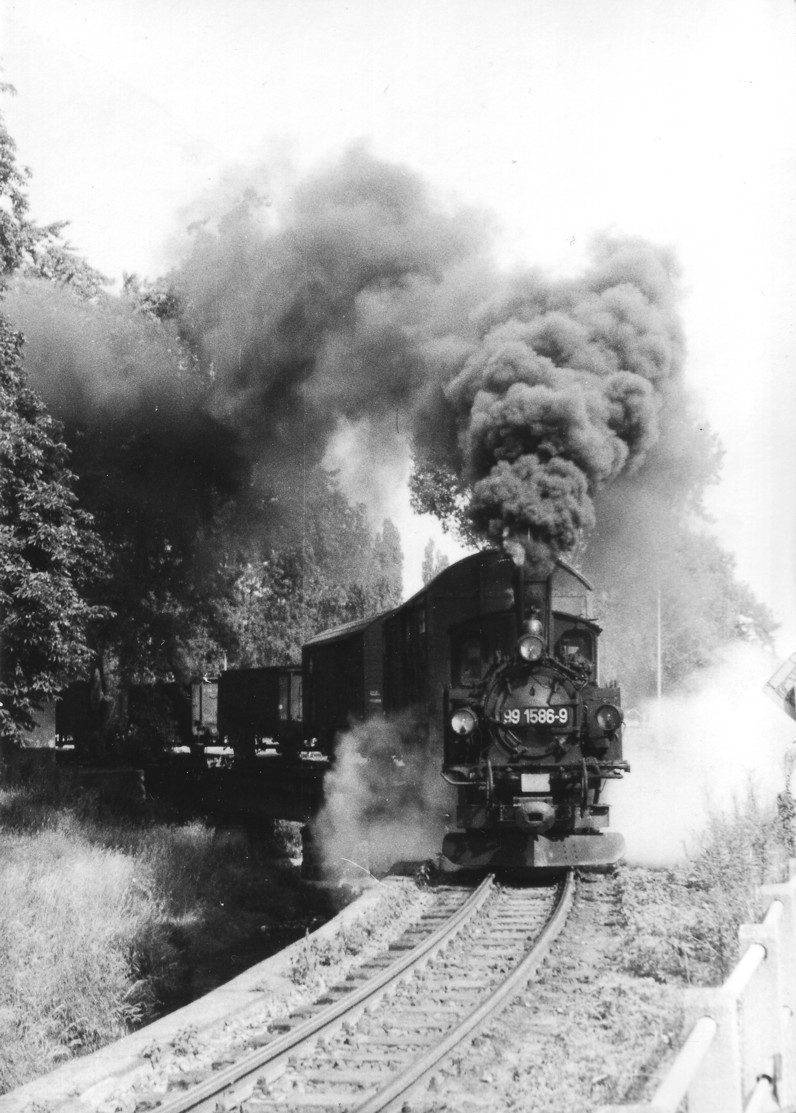
Transporter wagon train of the Mügeln railway network near Oschatz

By the beginning of 1975 – the year of the planned shutdown – there were still six narrow-gauge railways in operation in Saxony. The Thum–Meinersdorf section of the Thumer Netz still had cargo service, and a part of the Wilkau-Haßlau–Carlsfeld Railway was still operational. Two small tracks were used as industrial siding for paper mills. The condition of the rolling stock was good, since the shutdown of other railways freed up additional rolling stock. However, the tracks were in disrepair and required many slow zones. The remaining operations at the Thumer Netz ceased at the end of 1975, and passenger service was also terminated between Oschatz and Mügeln.

At the four railways that were to be kept, the necessary repairs and renewal of tracks and rolling stock made only slow progress. By 1977 the first modernized passenger car – the so-called REKO car – was put into service. The reconstruction of the remaining cars was progressing slowly, by the end of the 1980s only half of the existing passenger cars were updated.

A complete change in direction came in 1981, when the Soviet Union cut their oil exports to East Germany. With oil (and hence diesel) in high demand, the direction was changed to move all freight and passenger transports back to rail service. In addition, any planned railway service terminations of the DR were scrutinized, and – as a first reaction – it was decided to keep the railway between Oschatz and Mügeln of the Mügeln railway network. The tracks of this segment were rebuilt by 1984. However, the Pressnitz Valley Railway was still to be dismantled, and in 1986 operations ceased.

Until 1989, about one-half of the still existing tracks had been rebuilt. By 1987, the last of the rolling stock with Heberlein brakes was retired – after more than 100 years in service – since the shutdown of the Pressnitz Valley Railway freed enough rolling stock with vacuum brakes. By 1989, almost all Saxon rolling stock was converted to air brakes. By the end of the 1980s, the first Einheitslokomotiven and Neubaulokomotiven were retired due to frame and boiler damage. As a replacement of the aging fleet of steam locomotives, the DR in 1989 announced plans to import diesel locomotives from Romania by 1995.

=== New beginnings after 1990 ===
German reunification in 1990 placed the narrow-gauge railways in Saxony, which were at that point still operated by the Deutsche Reichsbahn, into a new situation. A working group was formed in order to establish how best to operate the railways under the new conditions.

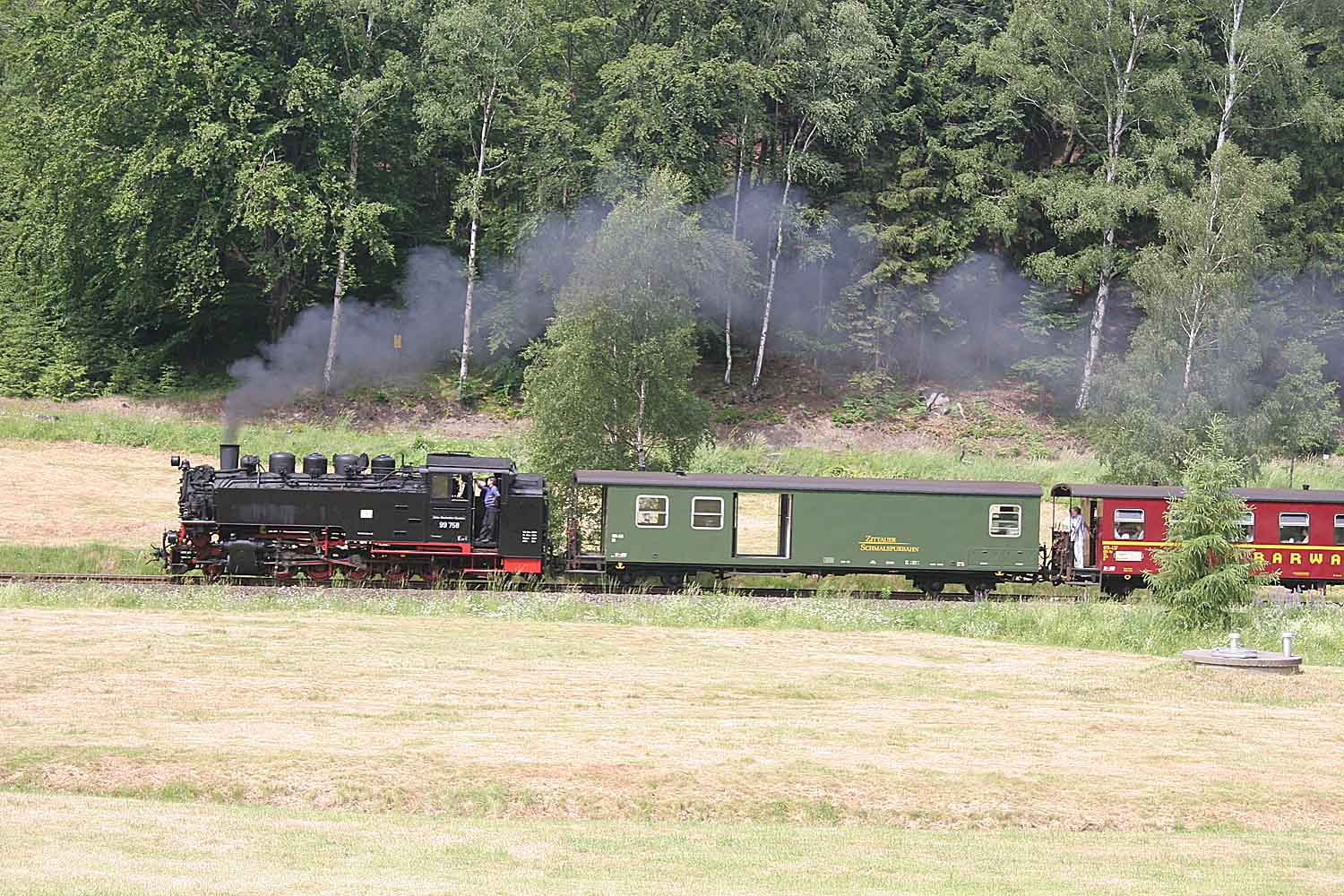
a train of the Zittau–Oybin/Jonsdorf railway heritage railway in 2008

Without government regulations holding them back, a group of enthusiasts formed in 1990 with the goal of rebuilding the upper part of the Pressnitz Valley Railway as fast as possible. Smiled upon at first, the group indeed managed to get segments of the railway operational, and within a few years a recognized heritage railway had been created.

By 1992 the direction was either to privatize or to abandon the narrow-gauge railways. The first victim was the Oschatz–Kemmlitz railway. Only the intervention of citizen groups and local government saved the railway, which was privatized as the Döllnitzbahn. For all other narrow-gauge railways, freight service was terminated.

In the mid-1990s the government of Saxony started to discuss concepts for the conservation of the narrow-gauge railways in the state. At first, the idea was to have an organization owned by the state of Saxony operating the railways; this concept was shelved. Instead, a privatization led by municipalities and their districts was the preferred solution. This was first put into practice in the district of Zittau, which at the end of 1996 together with track-side municipalities took over operations of the Zittau–Oybin–Jonsdorf railway. For the 100 year anniversary of the Fichtelberg Railway in 1997, a fest week was organized, which was unlike any other event involving narrow-gauge railways in Germany. With the success of that celebration, local politicians and Deutsche Bahn manager started to think in a new direction, and the local district and communities took over operations of this railway as well. In addition, the Deutsche Bahn decided to keep the two narrow-gauge railways near Dresden operational.

The current railway companies for the remaining narrow-gauge railways in Saxony are the Saxon Steam Railway Company, the Saxon Oberlausitz Railway Company and the Döllnitzbahn GmbH. As of 1 January 2009, the following railways remain operational:

- Saxon Steam Railway Company (Sächsische Dampfeisenbahn-Gesellschaft; SDG)
  - Cranzahl–Oberwiesenthal (Fichtelberg Railway)
  - Radebeul-East–Moritzburg–Radeburg (Radebeul–Radeburg railway)
  - Freital-Hainsberg–Kipsdorf (Weisseritztal railway)
- Saxon Oberlausitz Railway Company
  - Zittau–Oybin–Jonsdorf railway
- Döllnitzbahn GmbH
  - Oschatz–Mügeln–Kemmlitz (Döllnitzbahn)
- Heritage railway
  - Jöhstadt–Steinbach (Pressnitz Valley Railway)
  - Schönheide–Stützengrün (Wilkau-Haßlau–Carlsfeld Railway)

== Current lines ==
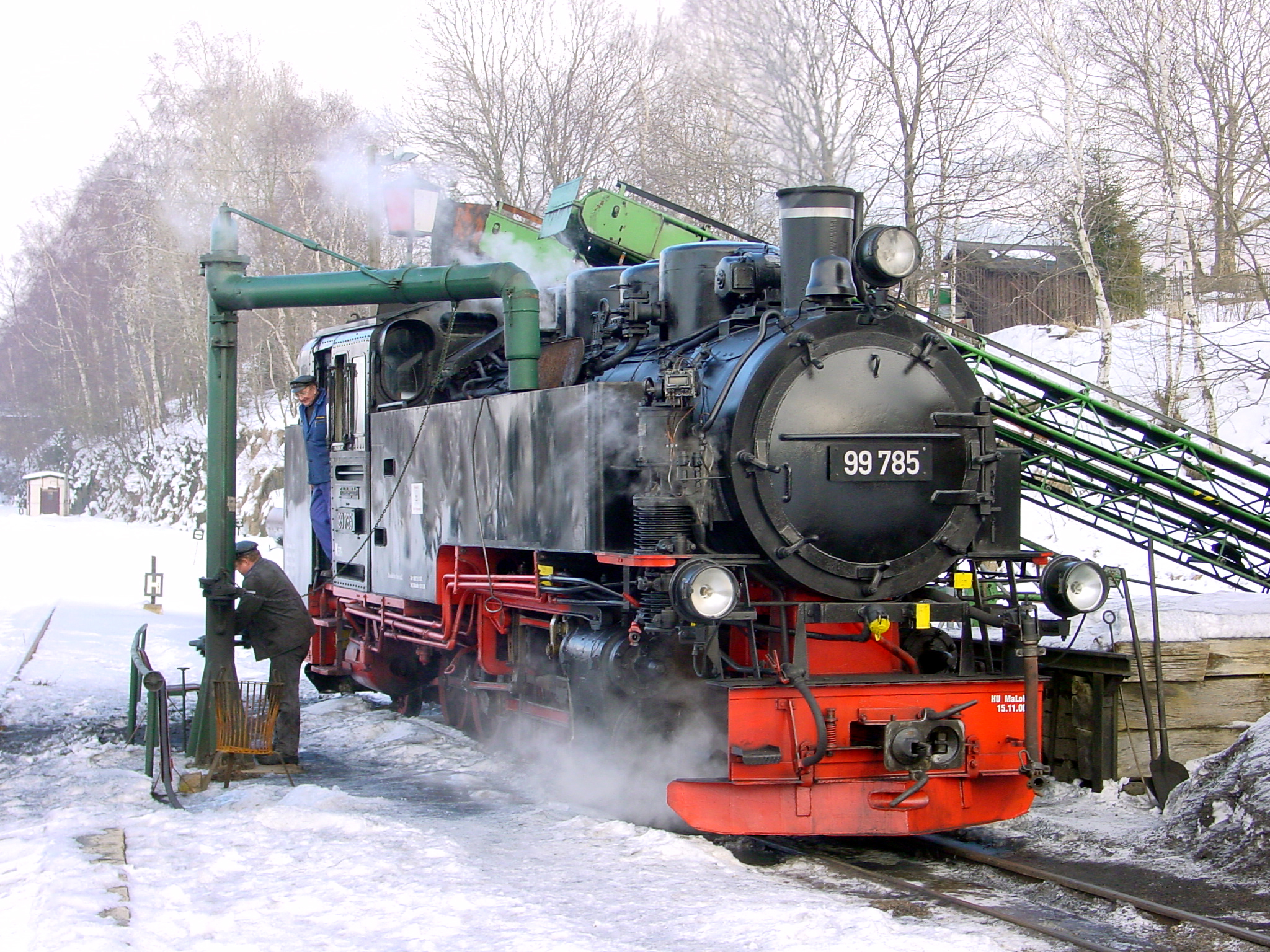
Cranzahl, Fichtelbergbahn

=== 750 mm (2 ft 5 1/2 in) gauge lines ===
- Fichtelberg Railway; Cranzahl–Oberwiesenthal
- Lößnitzgrundbahn; Radebeul-Ost–Moritzburg–Radeburg
- Weißeritztalbahn; Freital-Hainsberg–Kurort Kipsdorf
- Zittauer Schmalspurbahn; Zittau–Kurort Oybin / Kurort Jonsdorf (Sächsisch-Oberlausitzer Eisenbahn-GmbH)
- Wilder Robert; Oschatz–Mügeln–Kemmlitz (Döllnitzbahn GmbH)

=== 1,000 mm (3 ft 3 3/8 in) gauge lines ===
- Kirnitzschtalbahn

== Heritage railways ==
750 mm (2 ft 5 1/2 in) gauge

- Oberrittersgrün station 750 mm (2 ft 5 1/2 in) gauge
- Carlsfeld station 750 mm (2 ft 5 1/2 in) narrow gauge
- Jöhstadt – Steinbach Heritage Railway 750 mm (2 ft 5 1/2 in) narrow gauge
- Schönheide Heritage Railway 750 mm (2 ft 5 1/2 in) narrow gauge

600 mm (1 ft 11 5/8 in) gauge

- Waldeisenbahn Muskau 600 mm (1 ft 11 5/8 in) narrow gauge

== Park and miniature railways ==
600 mm (1 ft 11 5/8 in) gauge lines

- Görlitzer Oldtimer Parkeisenbahn
- Parkeisenbahn Chemnitz
- Parkeisenbahn Plauen
- Sächsisches Schmalspurbahn-Museum Rittersgrün

381 mm (15 in) gauge lines

- Dresdner Parkeisenbahn
- Leipziger Parkeisenbahn

== Closed lines ==
=== 1,000 mm (3 ft 3 3/8 in) gauge lines ===
- Rollbockbahn; Reichenbach im Vogtland–Oberheinsdorf; 1902–1962;
- Klingenthal–Sachsenberg-Georgenthal; electrified narrow-gauge line; 1916–1964

=== 750 mm (2 ft 5 1/2 in) gauge lines ===
- Wilkau-Haßlau–Carlsfeld Railway; (Wilkau-Haßlau–Kirchberg–Schönheide–Carlsfeld); 1881–1977
- Preßnitztalbahn Wolkenstein–Jöhstadt; 1897–1986
- Schwarzbach Railway (Schwarzbachbahn); Kohlmühle–Hohnstein; 1897–1951;
- Taubenheim (Spree)–Dürrhennersdorf; 1892–1945
- Herrnhut–Bernstadt; 1893–1945
- Zittau–Heřmanice (Hermsdorf); 1884–1945 (connected to Heřmanice–Frýdlant line)
- Mulda/Sa.–Sayda; 1897–1966
- Hetzdorf–Großwaltersdorf; 1893–1968
- Mülsengrund Railway (Mülsengrundbahn); Mosel–Ortmannsdorf; 1885–1951
- Pöhla Valley Railway (Pöhlatalbahn or Pöhlwassertalbahn); Grünstädtel–Oberrittersgrün; 1889–1971;

Mügeln railway network "Wilder Robert":

- Mügeln–Döbeln; 1884-1964/68
- (Mügeln)–Nebitzschen–Neichen; 1888–1972
- (Nebitzschen)–Kemmlitz–Kroptewitz; 1903–1967
- Oschatz–Strehla; 1891–1972
- Döbeln–Lommatzsch; 1911–1970
- Lommatzsch–Meißen-Triebischtal; 1909-1966/72

Thumer Netz:

- Wilischthal–Thum; 1886–1972
- Schönfeld-Wiesa–Thum; 1888–1967
- Thum–Meinersdorf; 1911–1974

Wilsdruffer Netz:

- Freital-Potschappel–Wilsdruff–Nossen; 1886–1972/73
- Meißen-Triebischtal–Wilsdruff; 1909-1966/69
- Klingenberg-Colmnitz–Frauenstein; 1898–1972
- Klingenberg-Colmnitz–Oberdittmannsdorf; 1923–1971

== Lines since converted to standard gauge ==
- Müglitz Valley Railway; Heidenau–Altenberg/Ore Mts.; 1890–1935/38; 750 mm (2 ft 5 1/2 in) gauge,
- Klotzsche–Königsbrück; 1884–1897; 750 mm (2 ft 5 1/2 in) gauge

== See also ==
- History of rail transport in Germany
- Rail transport in Germany
