= Wilkau-Haßlau–Carlsfeld narrow-gauge railway =

Railway line in Germany

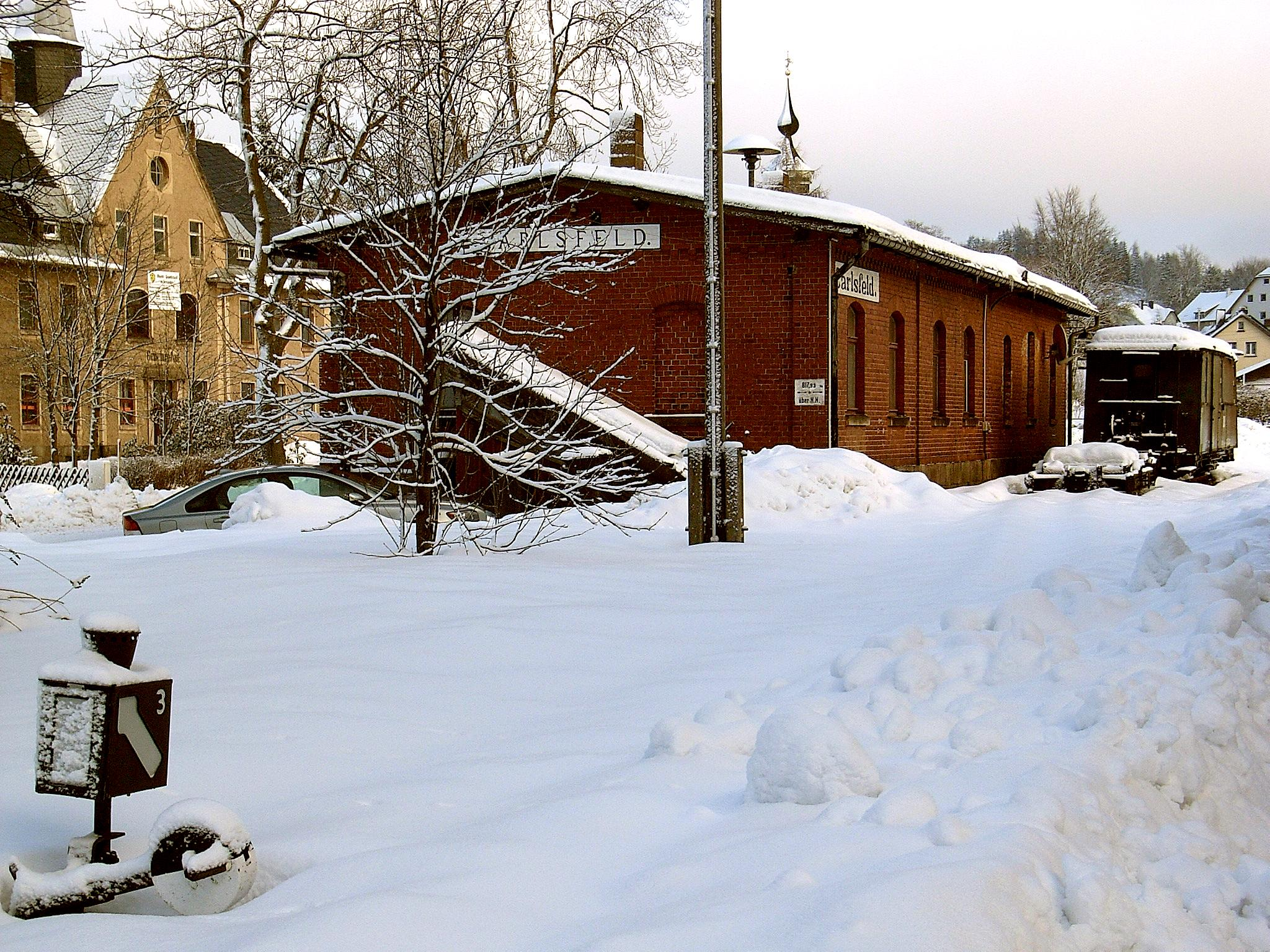
- Carlsfeld station (museum)

Overview
- Line number: 6973
- Coordinates: 50°26′08″N 12°35′02″E

Service
- Type: narrow-gauge railway
- Operator(s): Royal Saxon State Railways, Deutsche Reichsbahn, DR
- Depot(s): Kirchberg, Schönheide, Carlsfeld

History
- Opened: October 16, 1881
- Closed: April 30, 1977

Technical
- Line length: 41.961 km (26.07 mi)
- Track gauge: 750 mm (2 ft 5 1/2 in)
- Minimum radius: 60 m (196.9 ft)
- Operating speed: 25 km/h (16 mph)
- Maximum incline: 50‰ or 5%
Route map
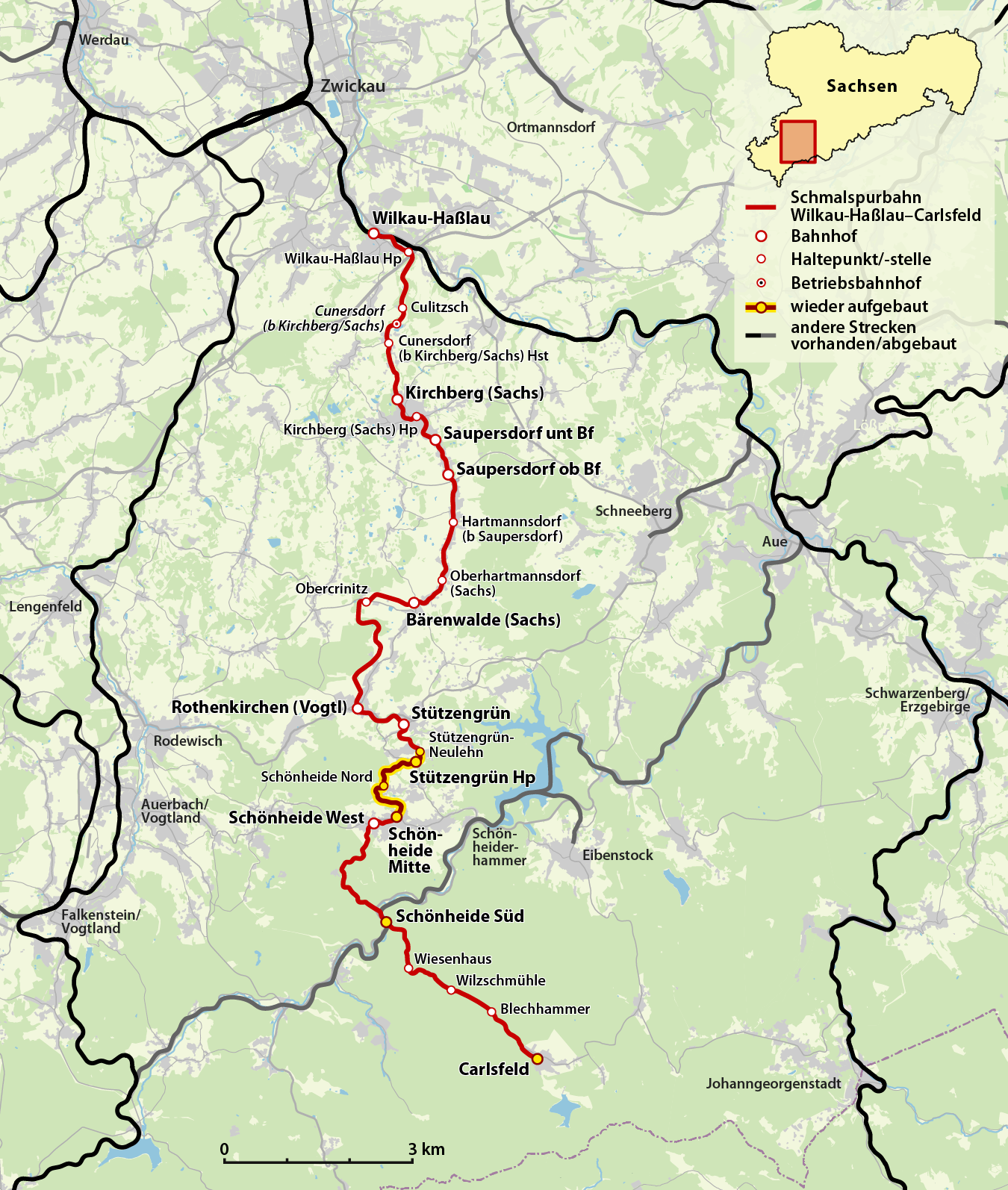

The Wilkau-Haßlau–Carlsfeld narrow-gauge railway (Schmalspurbahn Wilkau-Haßlau–Carlsfeld) was the first, steepest and, after the Wilsdruff–Döbeln-Gärtitz narrow gauge railway (which was 51.85 kilometres long), the second longest of the narrow-gauge railways in Saxony. The line was around 42 kilometres long, had a track gauge of 750 mm (2 ft 5 1/2 in) and ran from Wilkau-Haßlau via Kirchberg and Schönheide to Carlsfeld through the Ore Mountains. Only near Rothenkirchen did the line pass through the Vogtland region. The railway, opened in 1881 in four stages, was one of the busiest narrow-gauge railways. Services were gradually closed down between 1965 and 1977.

Since the Wende, two railway societies have operated a progressively rebuilt section of the line as a heritage railway. So far a four kilometre section near Schönheide Mitte as well as the two station yards at Schönheide Süd and Carlsfeld have been partially reconstructed.

== History ==
=== Background ===
In the mid-19th century the transport links to the town of Kirchberg and the surrounding area were extremely poor. There was just a messenger post four times a week - daily from 1850 - between Kirchberg and Silberstraße, which was supplemented in 1855 by a twice daily post coach. Thanks to the rise of the textile industry in the Kirchberg area, traffic volumes rose even more during the 1860s. Any further unfettered development of the textile industry, however, was limited by the need for water to provide power; this not only limited expansion, but also subjected the industry to seasonal variations. The construction of a railway would improve links to the emerging Zwickau Coalfield. In addition to reduced transport costs, the industry would also become more independent of the hydropower, in a region where the importation of coal from other areas was very difficult. Lignite imports from Bohemia, which were common in large parts of the Ore Mountains and its foreland until well into the 20th century, and were often one of the reasons for the construction of railway lines played no role in the Kirchberg area.

In 1864 a private company was granted the concession for the construction of a railway but, like another one in 1875, the project was not carried out due to financial problems. In 1866/67 only a road was built between Wilkau and Kirchberg and, in 1868, Wilkau Halt was erected on the Schwarzenberg–Zwickau railway, opened in 1858, but even these measures considerably improved Kirchberg's transport links.

In 1876/77, the idea of a narrow-gauge railway was presented in the Saxon parliament for the first time, after it appeared impossible to build and profitably operate a standard-gauge line alongside the chaussee that ran parallel to it. Although the line was approved as early as November, in 1877 Kirchberg townsfolk presented a petition, because they questioned the capability of a narrow-gauge railway. Its inherent disadvantages, were also pointed out, such as the labour-intensive transhipment of all goods that would be needed compared with a standard-gauge line. The Saxon government referred to the benefits, that narrow-gauge railways, whose the construction was backed by a royal decree of 5 November 1877, would bring for the country's development. For example, their construction costs were lower and stations could be built closer to the actual villages. Despite this, there was still no majority support in parliament for the narrow-gauge railway.

In 1879, the next decree again proposed the construction of narrow-gauge railways. For example, as well as the railway to Kirchberg, other narrow-gauge lines were to be built. These were the Oschatz–Mügeln–Döbeln line, with a branch to Wermsdorf, the Hainsberg–Schmiedeberg and Leipzig–Geithain lines, the last-named being the only one to be built subsequently to standard gauge. Advantages of the narrow-gauge railway that were stressed were the option of an extension to Saupersdorf and the possibility of installing numerous branch-off points. On 2 March 1880 the Wilkau-Kirchberg railway project achieved a majority. Its construction cost was estimated at 705,000 marks and included an extension to Saupersdorf.

=== Construction to Kirchberg and Saupersdorf ===
In April 1880 preparation work finally began on Saxony's first narrow-gauge railway. In the spring of 1881 the exact route and the award of construction contracts was announced. Construction began on 10 May 1881 at the so-called Hasenloch ("rabbit hole") with the construction of a retaining wall to the Rödelbach stream. Because most of the rails were laid by the side of the road or chaussee from Wilkau to Kirchberg, elaborate earthworks were unnecessary and work progressed quite rapidly. An average of 112 people were employed in the building of the railway, the highest number was 226 workers in August 1881. The first time the station at Kirchberg was used was when a construction locomotive owned by the firm of Lehmann arrived on 25 September 1881. After less than half a year's work, the track and almost all the associated buildings were completed and it was ceremonially opened on 16 October 1881 with the active participation of the population. Scheduled services began on 17 October 1881. The first railway administration office (Bahnverwalterei) was established in Kirchberg. It looked after the management and administration of all of the line with the exception of the Wilkau station. It was run in accordance with the "regulation for operations on narrow-gauge secondary railways by the Royal Saxon State Railways".

On 30 November 1881 Saxony's Finance Minister, Léonçe von Könneritz, invited the two chambers of the Saxon parliament to visit the narrow-gauge railway; the intention was that local representatives should visit the railway and assess its capability. Since the result was convincing, more and more narrow-gauge lines were subsequently approved.

In the September that year work began on the extension to the neighbouring village of Saupersdorf. Although the new section was very short (it was no longer than 4 kilometres), construction became a very complicated matter, as many retaining walls and bridges along the Rödelbach were needed. That explains why this short section from Kirchberg to Saupersdorf was officially opened more than a year later on 30 October 1882. Scheduled services on this section began on 1 November 1882.
