= Saxon IV K =

Saxon IV K DRG Class 99.51–60
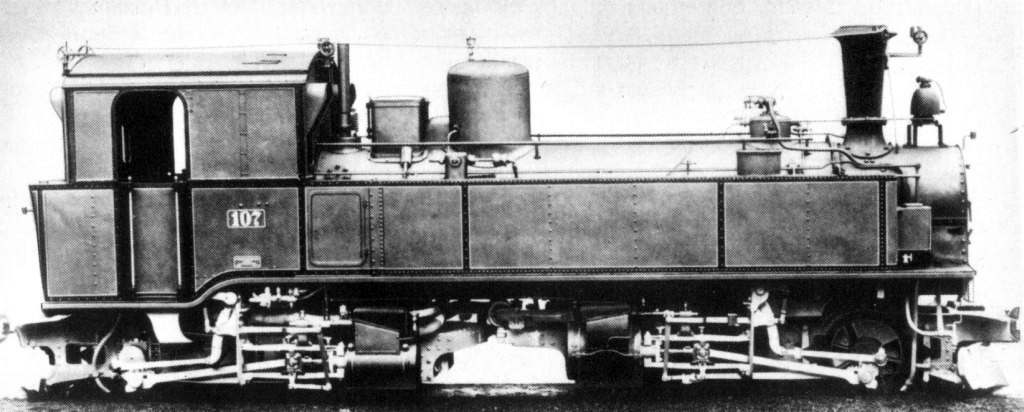
- Saxon IV K
Type and origin
- Builder: Sächsische Maschinenfabrik, Chemnitz
- Build date: 1892–1921
- Total produced: 96
Specifications
- Configuration
  - Whyte: 0-4-4-0T
  - German: K 44.7 / K 44.8 *
- Gauge: 750 mm (2 ft 5 1/2 in)
- Driver dia.: 760 mm (29 15/16 in)
- Wheelbase
  - Overall: 6,200 mm (20 ft 4 in)
- Length
  - Over couplers: 9,000 mm (29 ft 6 1/4 in)
- Width: 1,980 mm (6 ft 6 in)
- Height: 3,150 mm (10 ft 4 in)
- Axle load: 6.7–7.3 t
- Adhesive weight: 26.8–29.3 t
- Empty weight: 21.70–22.40 t
- Service weight: 26.8–29.3 t
- Fuel capacity: 0.85 t / 1.02 t ***
- Water cap.: 2.4 m^{3} (530 imp gal)
- Boiler pressure: 12/14/15 bar
- Heating surface
  - Firebox: 0.97 m^{2} (10.4 sq ft)
  - Radiative: 4.07 m^{2} (43.8 sq ft)
  - Evaporative: 49.87 m^{2} (536.8 sq ft)
- Cylinders: 4
- High-pressure cylinder: 240 mm (9 7/16 in)
- Low-pressure cylinder: 370–400 mm (14 9/16–15 3/4 in)
- Piston stroke: 380 mm (14 15/16 in)
- Valve gear: Walschaerts (Heusinger)
- Train brakes: Heberlein brake Vacuum brake
- Auxiliary brake: Counterweight brake
Performance figures
- Maximum speed: 30 km/h (19 mph)
- Indicated power: 210 PSi / 154 kW
- Tractive effort
  - Starting: 36.28 kN / 42.17 kN **
Career
- Numbers: see text
- * from 99 581 ** from 99 551 *** from 99 561

The Saxon IV K are narrow gauge, 0-4-4-0T Günther-Meyer type steam engines built for the Royal Saxon State Railways with a track gauge of 750 mm (2 ft 5 1/2 in). A total of 96 were built between 1892 and 1921, making the Saxon IV K the most numerous narrow gauge locomotive in Germany. In 1925 the Deutsche Reichsbahn grouped these engines into their DRG Class 99.51–60.

== History ==
As a result of the constantly rising traffic on the Saxon narrow gauge railways towards the end of the 19th century, the power of the existing Saxon I K and III K soon proved insufficient. So the Sächsische Maschinenfabrik developed an engine with eight coupled wheels and which had a larger boiler and adhesive weight. Unlike its predecessors, it was given two driven bogies in order to be able to cope with winding routes despite its length.

Between 1892 and 1921 a total of 96 locomotives were built with running numbers 103 to 198. To begin with they were designated as class H M T K V, which meant that they were locomotives built by Hartmann (H) to a Meyer design (M) as a tank engine (T) with a 750mm rail gauge (K) and compound engine (V). From 1896 they were reclassified as K IV and from 1900 as IV K. The 'K' stood for Kleinspur or 'small gauge'.

The IV K was used both in front of passenger trains and also goods trains and proved itself so well that it ousted the other locomotive classes completely on several lines.

Five locomotives (123, 139, 147, 148 and 174) were deleted from the roster after World War I. Three (123, 148, and 174) had been left behind in Hungary, and two (139 and 147) were handed over to Poland as reparations.

In 1925 the Deutsche Reichsbahn-Gesellschaft took over the remaining 91 units allocating them the numbers 99 511–546, 99 551–558, 99 561–579 and 99 581–608.

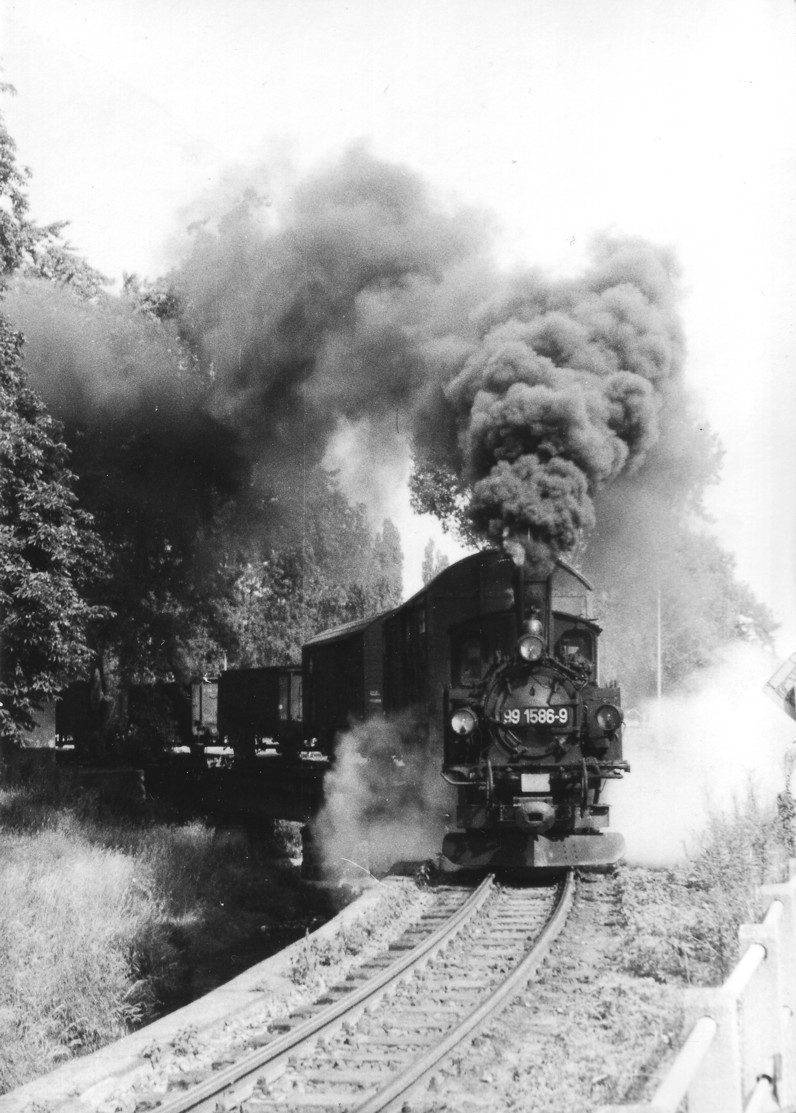
99 568 heading a goods train in Oschatz (1988)

From the 1930s onwards the oldest engines were retired. After the Second World War there were still 57 working locomotives of this class on Saxon railways. Nine locomotives later went to the Rügen Kleinbahn and to the Prignitz district Kleinbahnen, where they were fitted with Knorr brakes and in conjunction with that an impressive air reservoir on the boiler.

The DR planned to replace them with the Neubau diesel locomotives of DR Class V 36.48. However, because trials with the two prototypes were not promising, 20 of the former Saxon engines underwent extensive modernisation in 1962. To begin with the locomotives were given new welded boilers, and later a new welded locomotive frame as well. External identification marks of the upgraded locomotives are the missing sandbox on the boiler and the flatter steam dome cover.

By 1973 the last unmodernised locomotives had been retired from duty. Locomotives 99 535 (Dresden Transport Museum), 99 579 (Museum Rittersgrün) und 99 604 (DGEG, today SSB Radebeul), still in their original design, were secured for museum purposes.

The retirement of the reconstructed locomotives did not begin until the mid-1970s, starting with those engines that still had their original rivetted frames.

In 1991 there were only 13 IV K left in the operational fleet of the Deutsche Reichsbahn. In the wake of the merger of the running numbers of the DR and DB these engines were given the new numbers 099 701 to 099 713 on 1 January 1992. Several locomotives were however already sold to railway societies, so that not all of the engines displayed their newly allocated numbers.

Some locomotives ended up on 1 January 1994 in the Deutsche Bahn AG, but from that point on they were no longer used in scheduled services.

== Duties ==
Over the course of time the Saxon IV K locomotives were deployed to all Saxon narrow gauge lines. Even in the 1980s these engines were handling all the traffic on the Wolkenstein–Jöhstadt und Oschatz–Mügeln–Kemmlitz lines.

== Preserved locomotives ==
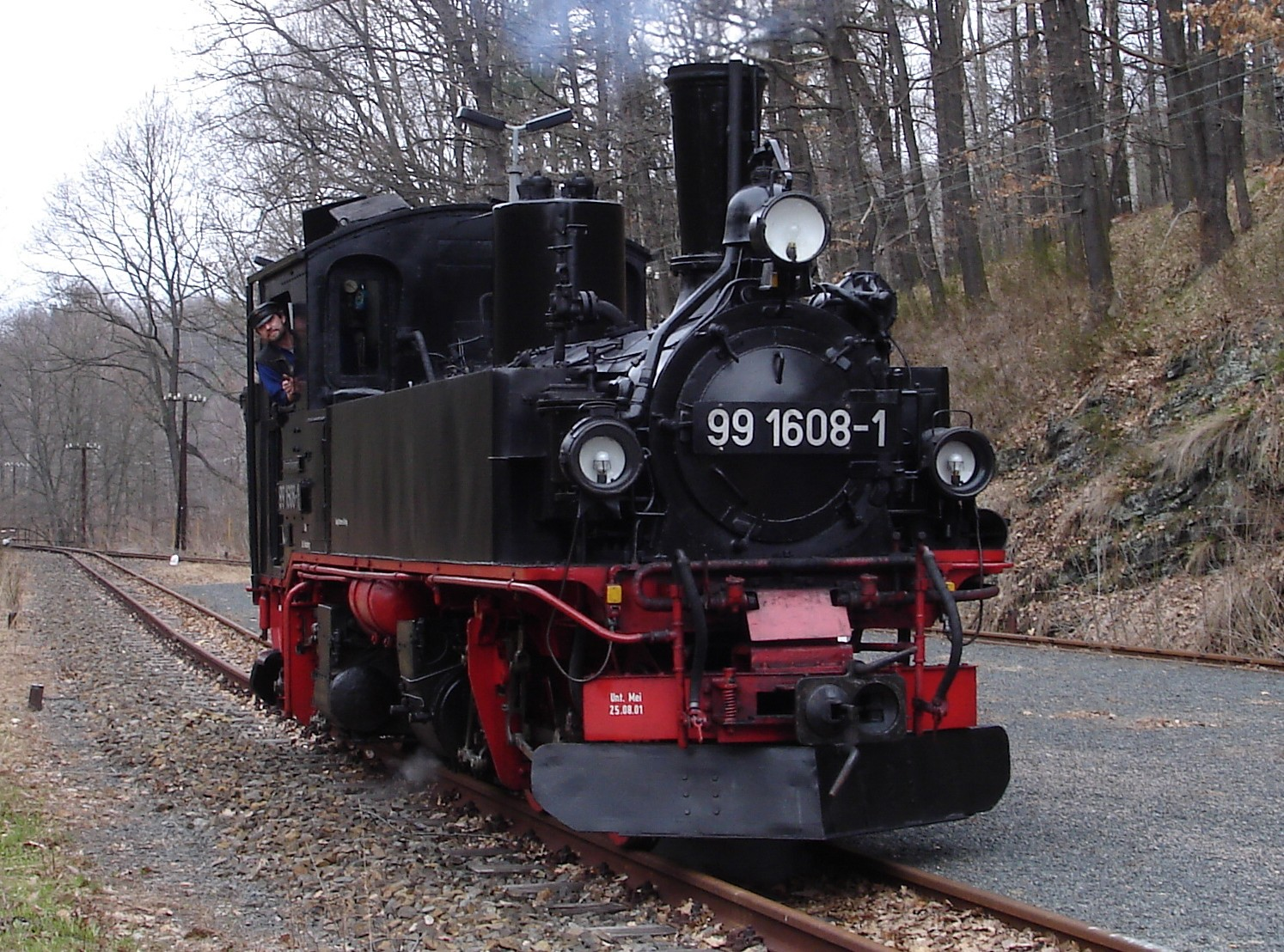
99 608 on the Weißeritztalbahn (2006)

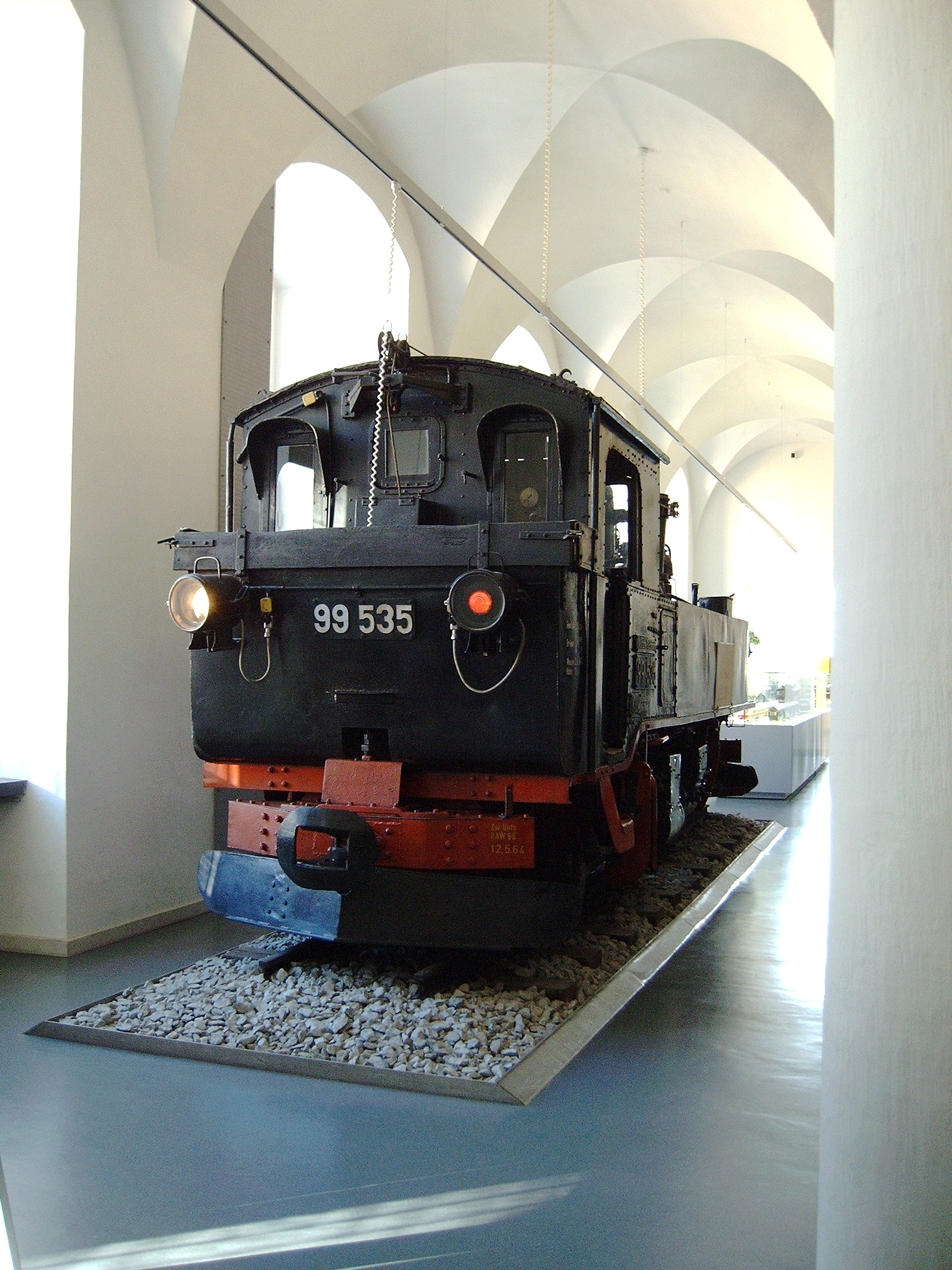
99 535 in the Dresden Transport Museum

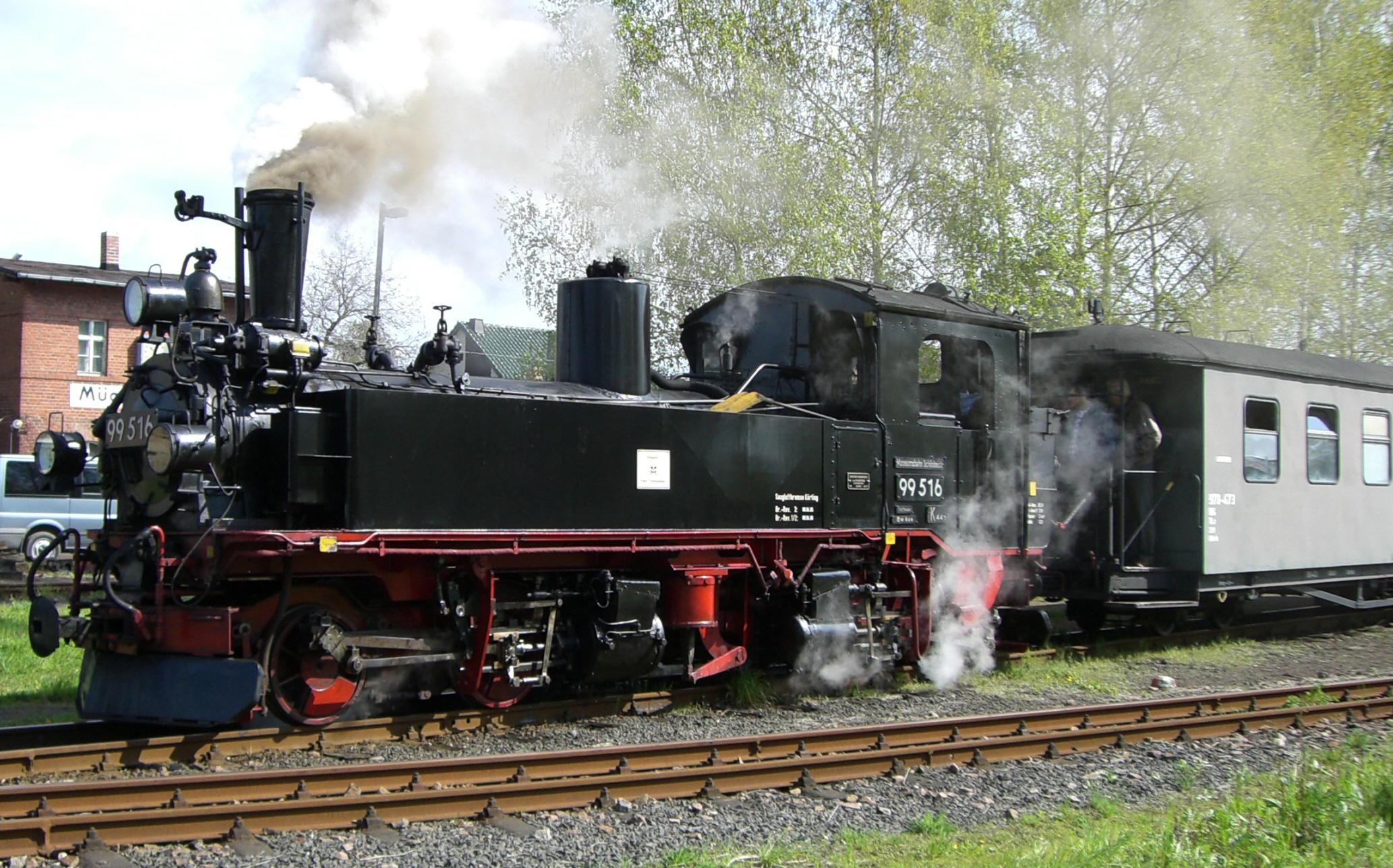
99 516 working as a museum railway engine

22 locomotives of Saxon Class IV K remain preserved today, the majority being operational. In addition to the Saxon museum railway groups the Saxon Steam Railway Company (formerly BVO Bahn) and the Döllnitzbahn GmbH employ IV K engines for special duties hauling museum trains.

- 99 516 – Museumsbahn Schönheide (working)
- 99 534 – Monument locomotive in Geyer
- 99 535 – Dresden Transport Museum
- 99 539 – Traditionsbahn Radebeul
- 99 542 – Preßnitztalbahn (working)
- 99 555 – Zittauer Schmalspurbahnen e.V. (working)
- 99 561 – Förderverein Wilder Robert (working)
- 99 562 – German Steam Locomotive Museum, Neuenmarkt-Wirsberg
- 99 564 – Saxon Steam Railway Company (working)
- 99 566 – Saxon Railway Museum, Chemnitz
- 99 568 – Preßnitztalbahn (working)
- 99 574 – Döllnitzbahn (working)
- 99 579 – Schmalspurbahnmuseum Rittersgrün
- 99 582 – Museumsbahn Schönheide (working)
- 99 584 – Rügen Railway & Technology Museum, Prora
- 99 585 – Museumsbahn Schönheide (working, loaned to the Schwarzbach railway)
- 99 586 – Traditionsbahn Radebeul
- 99 590 – Preßnitztalbahn (working)
- 99 594 – Rügensche Kleinbahn (working)
- 99 604 – Verein zur Förderung Sächsischer Schmalspurbahnen e.V. (SSB Radebeul)
- 99 606 – Verein zur Förderung Sächsischer Schmalspurbahnen e.V.
- 99 608 – Saxon Steam Railway Company (working)

== See also ==
- Royal Saxon State Railways
- List of Saxon locomotives and railbuses
