= David Weller (painter) =

German painter

David Weller, German painter, was born at Kirchberg in Saxony in 1759, and after studying at the Meissen school of design, was placed in the porcelain factory, where he painted historical pictures and portraits upon china. Later on he took to flower painting in oil and gouache, and to portraiture in pastel, but he had to struggle hard for a livelihood. His merits at last procured him the appointment of court painter to the Elector, but this preferment only reached him a few days before his death. He died at Dresden in 1789.
