= Zwickau–Schwarzenberg railway =

Main line railway in the German state of Saxony

Overview
- Line number: 6264
- Locale: Saxony, Germany
- Termini: Zwickau; Schwarzenberg (Erzgeb)

Service
- Route number: 535

Technical
- Line length: 38.132 km (23.694 mi)
- Number of tracks: 2: Zwickau Hbf – Schlema unt Bf
- Track gauge: 1,435 mm (4 ft 8 1/2 in) standard gauge
- Minimum radius: 170 m (558 ft)
- Operating speed: 80 km/h (49.7 mph) (maximum)
- Maximum incline: 1.25%

The Zwickau–Schwarzenberg railway is a main line railway in the German state of Saxony. It extends from Zwickau through the valleys of the Zwickauer Mulde and the Schwarzwasser via Bad Schlema and Aue to Schwarzenberg. It opened in 1858 and it is one of the oldest railways in Germany. It is now served by Regionalbahn trains, operated by Erzgebirgsbahn (a subsidiary of Deutsche Bahn) between Zwickau and Johanngeorgenstadt.

== History ==
The Zwickau–Schwarzenberg line originated as the Zwickau–Bockwa coal railway, which was built by the Saxon State Railways in 1854 to connect the coal mines near Zwickau with markets. To transport coal and supply the mining operations in the Ore Mountains, the line was soon extended along the Mulde and the Schwarzwasser valleys to Schwarzenberg.

On 15 October 1855, construction began on the line known as the Upper Ore Mountain Railway (German: Obererzgebirgische Bahn) and it opened 15 May 1858, after almost three years of work.

=== Operations ===
By 1900, parts of the line had been rebuilt for two-track operations. Between Hartenstein and Aue the old single-track line was abandoned completely and replaced by a new straightened realignment.

The second track was dismantled in 1946 for reparations to the Soviet Union as a result of World War II. In 1946, the Soviet Wismut company started uranium mining in the Ore Mountain and the line quickly achieved a prominent role for the removal of milled uranium ores and in carrying commuter traffic to the newly established mine shafts. The line was a single-track until 1948, when the second track was restored.

Until 1990, express trains operated on the line. Notably there was a daily service between Aue and Berlin. In the 1960s, there was a fast train service with through coaches from Berlin to Cranzahl on the line.

Today the line is mainly served by Regionalbahn trains of the Erzgebirgsbahn on the Zwickau–Johanngeorgenstadt route. Freight transport still operates, but is insignificant in contrast to the past.

=== Rehabilitation ===
Despite falling market share in the 1990s, the importance of the route for transport in the western Ore Mountains was undisputed. In 1999/2000 a comprehensive rehabilitation program began with the goal of significantly increasing operating speeds. Between Aue and Schwarzenberg, the line was rebuilt as a single-track line on the two-track subgrade in order to widen the narrow curves. As the enlargement of the Schlema tunnel to meet modern clearances would have been very expensive, the track on this section was also singled. Original plans called for a single track between Zwickau and Schlema. This was not realized for operational reasons, however, especially since the establishment of stations with crossing loops would have been very expensive.

=== Connecting lines ===
A line opened in 1859 serving the mountain town of Schneeberg from Schlema unterer (lower) station. Because of the mining of uranium under the line by the Soviet Wismut company, the branch line closed about 1950 for safety reasons. The remainder of the line to Oberschlema closed in 1990 and was subsequently demolished.

Since 1872, the line has connected to the Chemnitz–Aue–Adorf line via Aue station. The line from Chemnitz to Aue is line now integrated as the Zwönitz Valley Railway (Zwönitztalbahn) in the network of the Erzgebirgsbahn company. Construction of the Eibenstock dam in 1975 severed the line to Adorf and since the mid-1990s the remainder of the line to Blauenthal has not operated.

The line was extended from Schwarzenberg to Johanngeorgenstadt (Schwarzenberg–Johanngeorgenstadt line) in 1883 and to Annaberg in 1889 (Annaberg-Buchholz–Schwarzenberg line). Both lines are still in operation. However, the line to Annaberg-Buchholz has had no scheduled passenger traffic since 1997 and only freight traffic to Grünstädtel.

A narrow gauge line opened in 1881 from Wilkau-Haßlau to Kirchberg, which was later extended through the ridges of the Ore Mountains to Carlsfeld. This was longest narrow gauge railway in Saxony until it ceased operation in 1973.

== Route ==
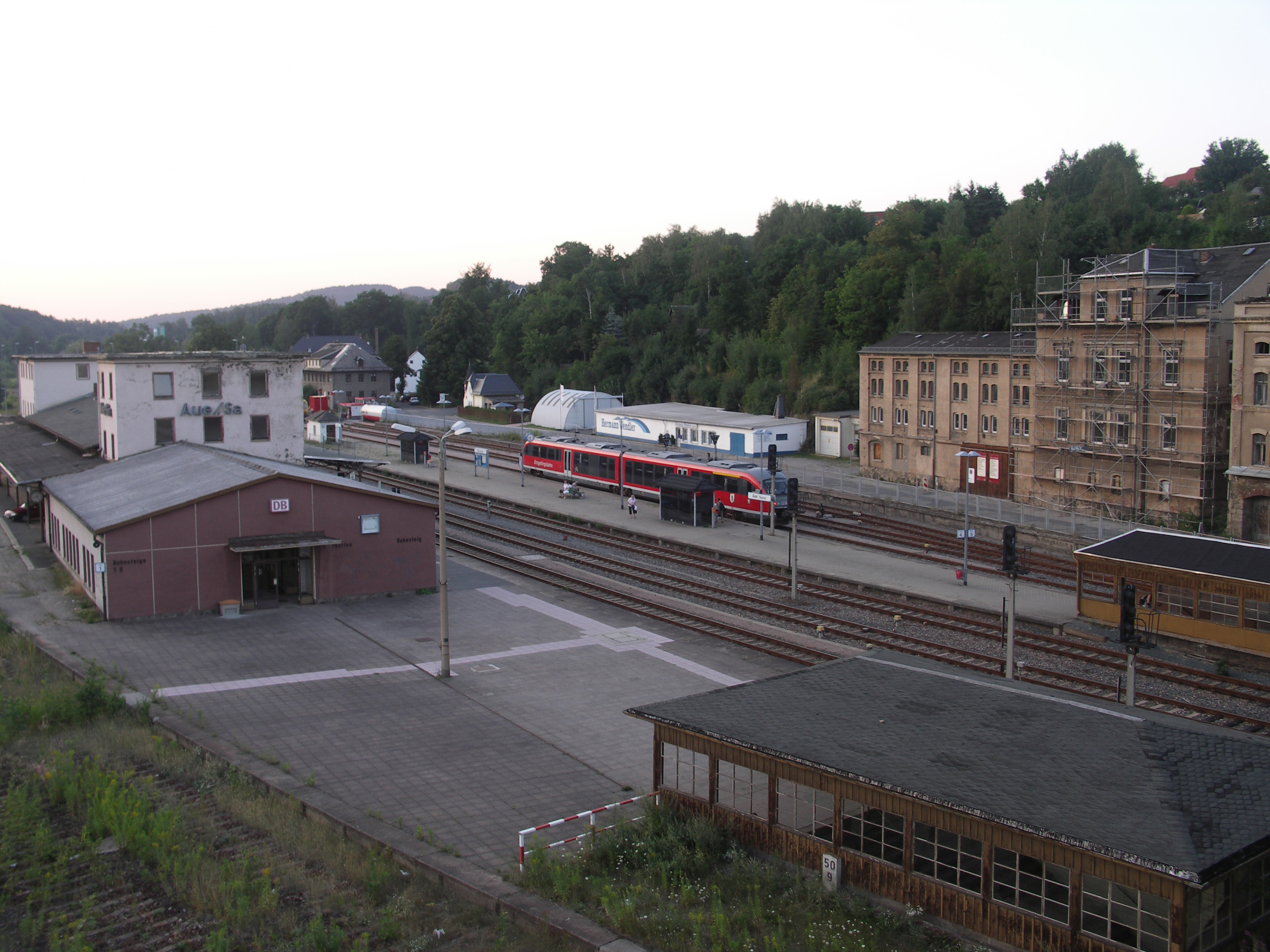
Aue station

The route begins on the south side of Zwickau Hauptbahnhof and leaves the station to the south with a curve to the west. Soon after, a line runs to the left that connects to the tram track (which has been converted to mixed gauge with three rails) and extends to central Zwickau, which is used by the trains of Vogtlandbahn on the Zwickau Zentrum–Kraslice route. An almost straight track leads south through the Zwickau suburbs of Schedewitz and Cainsdorf to Wilkau-Haßlau. From 1881 to 1973, a narrow gauge line ran from Wilkau-Haßlau to Kirchberg and later Carlsfeld. Shortly after Wilkau Haßlau the line passes under the former narrow gauge line and then under the huge valley-spanning viaduct of the A72 autobahn (Leipzig–Hof). The line passes through Silberstraße, Wiesenburg and Fährbrücke along the narrow valley of the Zwickauer Mulde. Near Hartenstein station, the line passes Burg Stein castle then runs through a narrow wooded valley. Shortly after, it passes the railway buildings of the former Shaft 371 uranium mine, once the deepest mine in Europe. A platform operated until the early 1990s for Wismut mine passenger traffic. After the next station, Schlema unter (lower), the line passes through the only tunnel en route to Aue. In Aue, the line crosses the route of the former Chemnitz–Aue–Adorf line then leaves the Mulde valley. The route has several extremely tight curves, climbing the Schwarzwasser valley then reaches Lauter. Finally, it passes through Schwarzenberg Neuwelt and terminates at the Schwarzenberg station.
