= Chemische Werke Kluthe =

German chemical company

Chemische Werke Kluthe GmbH
- Company type: GmbH
- ISIN: inexistent
- Industry: Chemicals
- Founded: 1950
- Headquarters: Heidelberg, Deutschland
- Key people: Martin Kluthe, Robert Kluthe
- Revenue: 300 Mio. Euro
- Number of employees: 1000
- Website: www.kluthe.com

Chemische Werke Kluthe GmbH is a German-based chemical company headquartered in Heidelberg. The Kluthe group has 23 German and 39 international marketing bases and produces a total of 160,000 tons of goods to supply in 51 countries.

== Business segments ==
Chemische Werke Kluthe GmbH develops, produces, and sells chemicals and chemical processes for surface treatment. The product range covers, among others, cooling lubricants, industrial cleaning agents, pre-treatment solutions, preservative solvents, flushing media for paints and lacquers, de-lacquerers, and chemicals for water treatment.

The Kluthe Group supplies the worldwide automotive industry, their subcontractors, as well as the industries of construction and agricultural machinery, steel, cans, and plastic components. The company also supplies painters via specialists and wholesale trade.

== History ==
=== Foundation and company structure ===
The company Kluthe Fabrikation chemisch-technische Erzeugnisse was founded in 1950 by Maria and Wilhelm Kluthe. Initially operating a laboratory out of a garage, the company’s first product was a universal paint solvent and thinner. In 1953, Kluthe introduced Controx, the first liquid cold paint stripper for air-drying paints and stoving enamels available in Europe. Unlike the highly alkaline, corrosive hot paint strippers requiring a boiling process, Controx could be used at room temperature in an immersion process - an advance on the then-customary hot alkaline de-lacquering.

In 1954, the company acquired property on Gottlieb-Daimler-Straße in Heidelberg (Germany), where a small distillation plant was installed for the regeneration of organic solvents. This location now serves as the administrative headquarters of the Kluthe Group.

The idea of supplying chemicals and recovering valuable resources from residual materials led to the development of the firm's "5-C-Concept": cut, clean, coat, conserve, and clear.

=== Product range extension and expansion ===
Kluthe expanded its operations significantly beginning in 1969 with the acquisition of Sahm-Chemie. This acquisition established the foundation for supplying paint wholesalers and specialist retailers with a broader range of products, including paints, primers, and paint solvents. Over time, this product range was further developed to meet the needs of these markets.

In 1972, Kluthe expanded internationally by acquiring the Dutch paint factory De Graaff en Baas B.V. in Alphen aan den Rijn. This acquisition led to the formation of Kluthe Benelux BV in 2001, solidifying the company’s presence in the Netherlands.

To address capacity demands at the Gottlieb-Daimler-Straße plant, a new facility was constructed in Heidelberg-Wieblingen in 1973. This site now houses Kluthe’s research and development center for all surface pre-treatment products.

In 1997, Kluthe further expanded its product portfolio by acquiring Continental Lack- und Farbenwerke Friedrich Wilhelm Wiegand Söhne GmbH in Oberhausen. This acquisition added the Contilack brand of building protection paints to the company's offerings, broadening its reach into construction-related coatings.

=== Recycling plants and international expansion ===
In 1991, Kluthe acquired the Lipsia chemical factory in Mügeln near Leipzig from the Treuhand agency. The facility became a cornerstone of the company's recycling efforts with the installation of its first solvent distillation plant in 1997. This innovation in recycling used solvents earned Kluthe the environmental protection award from the Federation of German Industries in 1998. The company expanded its recycling activities further in 2007 with the addition of another recycling plant in Heidelberg. These operations are managed by Kluthe's subsidiary, Rematec GmbH, which was founded in 2007 and has leased the Mügeln and Heidelberg sites since 2009.

Kluthe began its international expansion in 2010 by forming a joint venture with the Turkish chemical company Duraner. In subsequent years, the company established subsidiaries in Brazil (2012) and Mexico (2014), further expanding its global footprint. A joint venture with the Indian company Zavenir followed in 2017, enhancing Kluthe's presence in South Asia.

In 2016, the company restructures its operations under the parent entity Kluthe Chemicals GmbH & Co KG. Continuing its international growth, Kluthe founded its Canadian subsidiary, Kluthe Sustainability Management, in 2019 to focus on sustainable solutions within the industry.

== Business activities ==
The Kluthe Group's business activities are divided into several key areas. The Metalworking & Cleaning division focuses on the production of lubricants, industrial cleaners, and corrosion protection products for metalworking processes. The Forming & Protection segment supplies forming media and corrosion protection solutions. In the Pretreatment division, the company provides products and processes for surface preparation, particularly for painting and coating applications. The Paintshop segment includes process chemicals and materials for metal and plastic painting, as well as architectural paints.

=== Recycling ===
The Kluthe Group operates the "Rema" recycling system in collaboration with paint wholesalers to support painting companies in the disposal and recycling of residual materials. Recycled materials include non-halogenated organic solvents, dichloromethane, used paints, paint coagulates, powder coatings, water-based rinsing liquids from water-soluble paint applications, as well as used oils and processing oils. These materials are processed to recover and produce new raw materials, contributing to resource efficiency and environmental sustainability.

Kluthe's 100% subsidiary, Rematec GmbH, specialises in this chemical recycling and waste treatment process, including the recovery and reprocessing of solvents. The company primarily serves the automotive industry, along with other sectors such as construction and agricultural machinery, plastic components manufacturing, can and strip production, and the tube and wire industry.

Rematec GmbH recovers recyclable resources from painting companies who deposit their residual materials in specialised disposal containers. The containers are then collected and processed by the Rematec. The collected residual materials are recycled at Kluthe's recycling plants in Mügeln (Germany) and Wieblingen (Germany), both of which comply with the European environmental standard DIN EN ISO 14001:2015.

== Architectural paints and lacquers ==
In 1997, the Kluthe group expanded its product line with high-quality architectural paints by acquisition of the Oberhausen (Germany)-based Continental Lack- und Farbenwerke Friedrich Wilhelm Wiegand und Söhne GmbH. Today, Oberhausen is home to central research and development and production for the architectural paints division. In Asperg, Conti-Coating produces thinners in small packages for painters, consumers and Conti-Coatings BENELUX (Alphen, Netherlands).

== Raw materials ==
Recently, a Kluthe-group production company in Mügeln (Germany) started producing microbeads and fillers for the lacquer and cosmetic industries respectively.

== Further production sites and sales organization ==
Alphen aan den Rijn (NL) is the group's biggest production site outside Germany and supplies the whole of the Benelux market.

In Kuntzig (France), the Kluthe group produces lacquers, solvents and thinners, as well as cleaning agents, de-lacquerers and coagulants for the French market.

A production site in Guadalajara, Spain supplies the Spanish and Maghrib market with the whole range of pre-treatment products and chemicals for water treatment.

Independent sales and service companies operate under the Kluthe brand in Poland, Czech Republic, Belgium, UK, Switzerland and Austria. Licensees and distributors represent the Kluthe group in Finland, Hungary, Romania, Belarus, Ukraine, Russia, Croatia and Serbia.

A site in Bursa (Turkey) covers the Turkish and Middle Eastern markets.

Kluthe subsidiaries in Brazil and Mexico are active since 2012 and 2014 respectively. A Chicago base supplies, and a Detroit base supervises the US and Canadian markets.

Kluthe-India supplies Kluthe products for the cleaning, cooling lubricants and conserving markets. Kluthe Chemicals Shanghai supervises the Chinese, Taiwanese, Thai and Vietnamese markets.

== External Sites ==
Kluthe Company Website
