= Mügeln railway network =

The 750 mm (2 ft 5 1/2 in) gauge Mügeln railway network (Mügelner Netz) was a network of narrow gauge lines in Saxony, eastern Germany, running between Oschatz, Döbeln, Neichen, Strehla and Lommatzsch, whose operational hub was at Mügeln. The routes were built primarily to reach the rural hill country of central Saxony. Mügeln station was once one of the largest narrow gauge railway stations in Europe.

== Routes ==
- Oschatz–Mügeln–Döbeln; *1884 (Mügeln–Döbeln closed in 1964/1968)
- Mügeln–Nebitzschen–Neichen; 1888–1972 (Mügeln–Glossen still working)
- Nebitzschen–Kemmlitz–Kroptewitz; 1903–1967 (Nebitzschen–Kemmlitz still working)
- Oschatz–Strehla; 1891–1972
- Meißen-Triebischtal–Lommatzsch; 1909–1966/72
- Lommatzsch–Döbeln; 1911–1970

== History ==
On 7 January 1885 the first section of the route between Mügeln and Oschatz was opened. In 1920 it was taken over by the Deutsche Reichsbahn.

The survival of the Kemmlitz–Mügeln–Oschatz line since 1975 is mainly thanks to the transportation of kaolin.

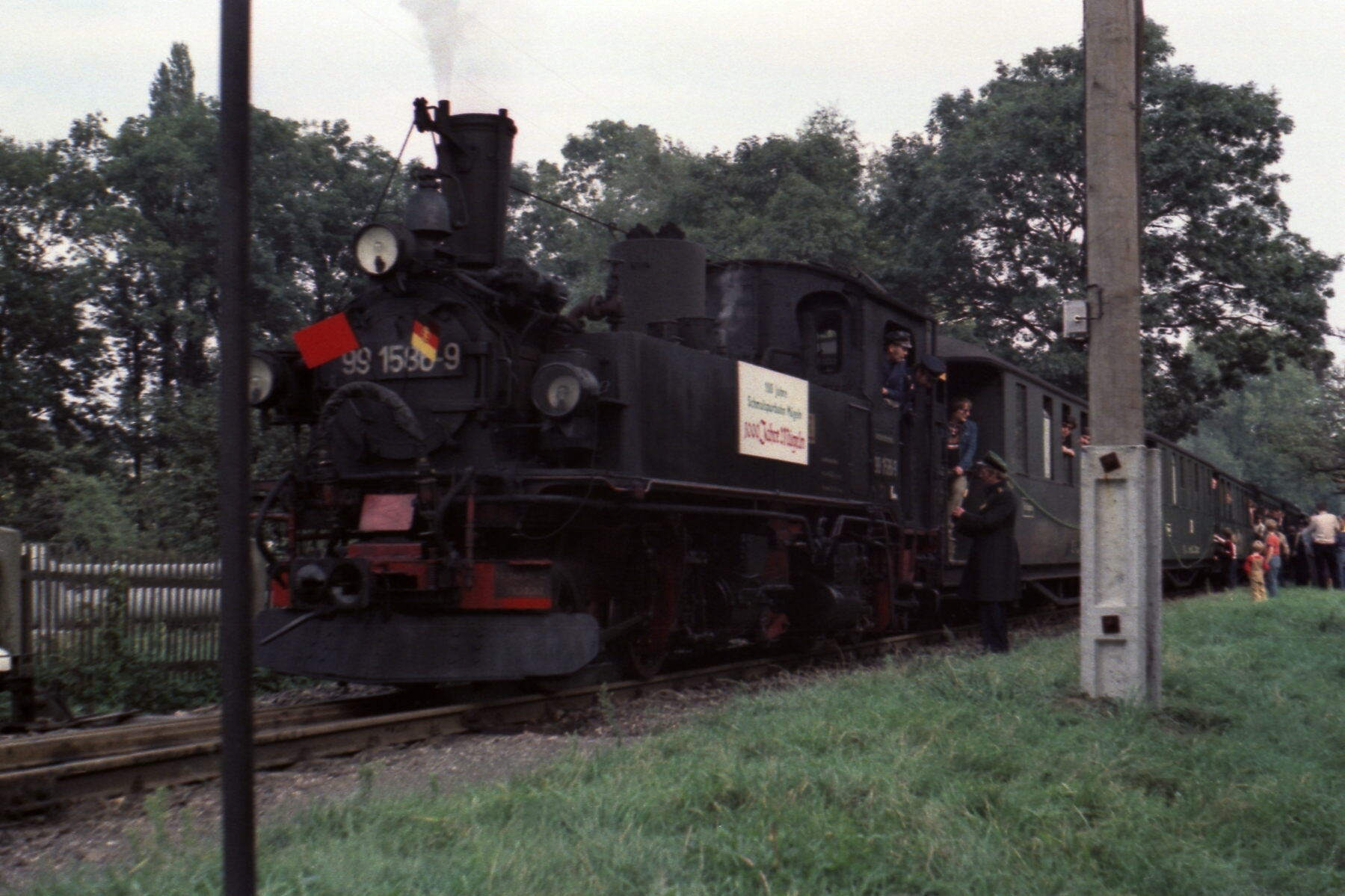
99 1586 at Altmügeln on 29 September 1984

In November 1993 the Deutsche Reichsbahn transferred the remaining section of line to the newly founded private railway company, Döllnitzbahn. This had been formed in 1993 as the result of an initiative by the district of Torgau-Oschatz and the passenger association, Pro Bahn. The primary aim of the company was initially the preservation of the existing goods traffic from the kaolin mine in Kemmlitz. For that purpose, second-hand, narrow gauge, goods wagons were bought from the Mansfeld mining railway and a new transshipment site to the standard gauge railway network was built in Oschatz. With the help of used PKP diesel locomotives, they succeeded initially in keeping the goods traffic going. In spite of this, the demand gradually fell so that goods services had to be closed in 2001. The Döllnitzbahn was the last narrow gauge railway in Saxony to run public freight services.

== Förderverein Wilder Robert ==
The Förderverein Wilder Robert ('Society for the Promotion of the 'Wild Robert') was founded in 1994 with the aim of preserving the historic sites and vehicles of the so-called Wilder Robert or 'Wild Robert' line. To begin with the society's sphere of activity was the running of special trips with the existing, operational vehicle fleet using, amongst others, the Saxon IV K steam locomotives, nos. 99 561, 99 574 and 99 584.

With the help of ABM and local firms, members of the society gradually began to restore the distinctive buildings along the narrow gauge railway. These included the Mügeln goods shed, the first-aid building, signal box I and the railway maintenance building. The society's biggest achievement was the rebuilding of the Nebitzschen–Glossen line with the assistance of the village of Sornzig-Ablass.

Progress has been made on the vehicle front too. The Saxon IV K, numbers 99 561 and 99 574 underwent their general inspections in 2001-2003 and 2006-2007 respectively. Even wagons were refurbished; the heavy luggage van 970-277 being completed in 2001. It was followed by the goods wagon GGw 97-15-02, lidded wagon KKw 97-27-18 and luggage van KD4 974-309. More vehicles are planned to be restored.

== See also ==
- Royal Saxon State Railways
- Narrow gauge railways in Saxony
- List of Saxon locomotives and railbuses

== Literature ==
- Erich Preuß, Reiner Preuß: Schmalspurbahnen in Sachsen, transpress Verlag, Stuttgart 1998, ISBN 3-613-71079-X
- Gustav W. Ledig: Die schmalspurigen Staatseisenbahnen im Königreiche Sachsen, Leipzig 1895. Reprint: Zentralantiquariat der DDR, Leipzig 1987, ISBN 3-7463-0070-3
- Ludger Kenning: Schmalspurbahnen um Mügeln und Wilsdruff, Verlag Kenning 2000, ISBN 3-933613-29-9
