= Karl Emanuel Klitzsch =

German composer, organist and music critic (1812–1889)

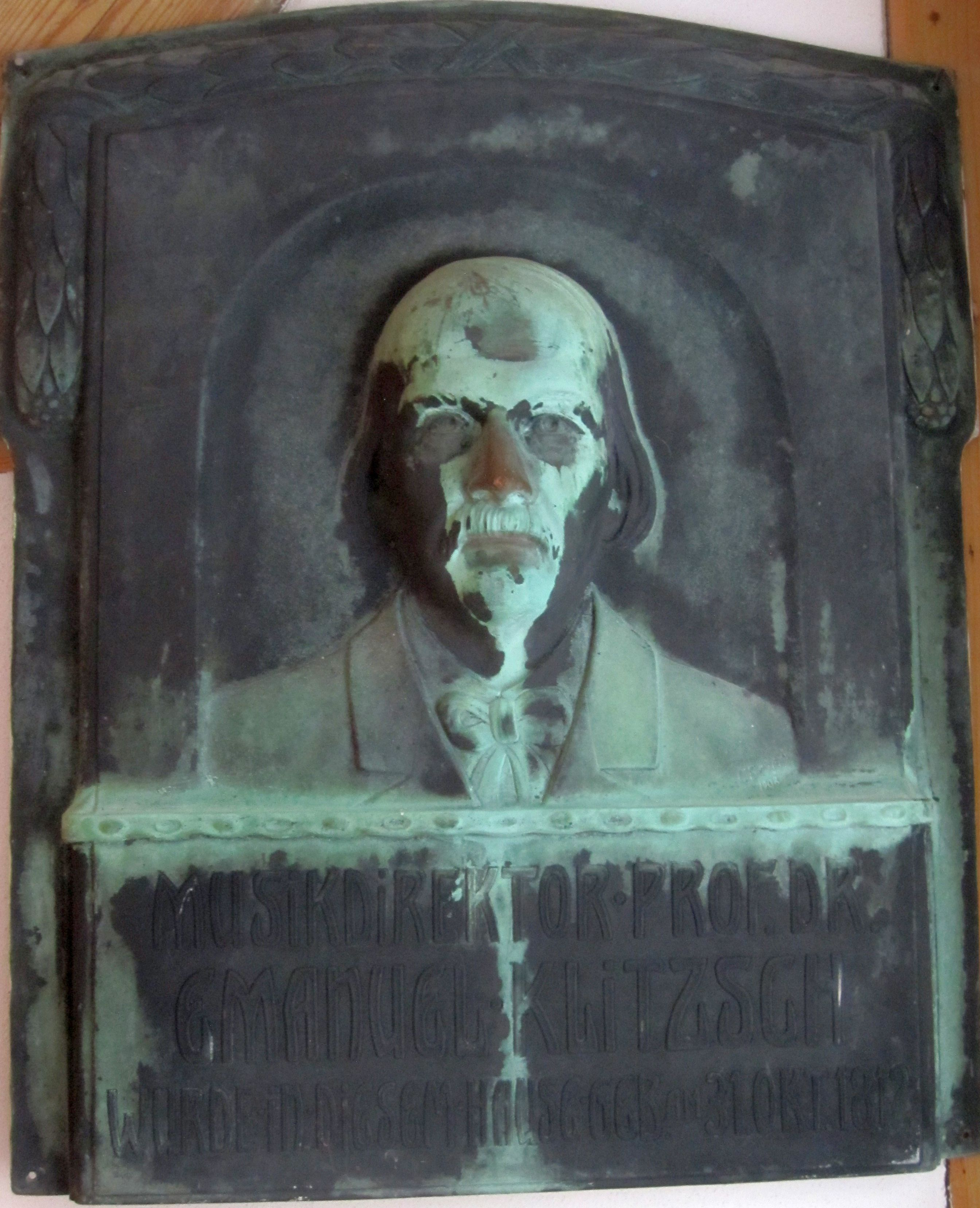
Portrait of the artist at his birthplace

Karl Emanuel Klitzsch, or often just Emanuel Klitzsch, (Schönheide, 30 October 1812 – Zwickau, 5 March 1889) was a German composer, organist and music critic. He was a friend of Robert Schumann and promoted his works. He was also a director in Zwickau, teacher at the Zwickau Gymnasium and writer for the Neue Zeitschrift für Musik. As a composer, he used the pseudonym Emanuel Kronach.
