= Döllnitzbahn =

Railway company in Saxony, Germany

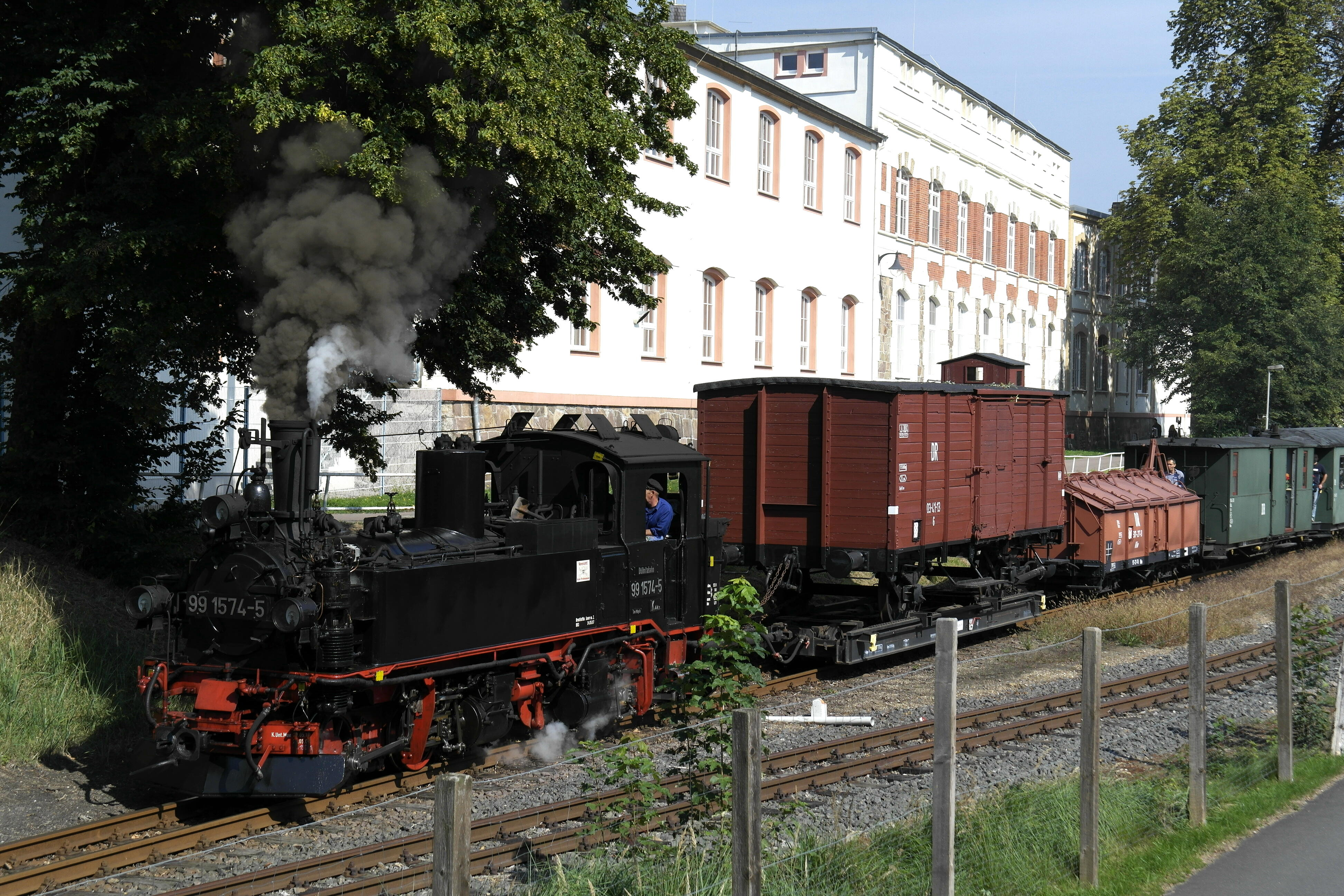
Oschatz-Süd, special trip on the occasion of the jubilee "130 years narrow gauge railway line Oschatz - Mügeln"

The Döllnitzbahn GmbH is a private railway company in Saxony in eastern Germany. It is the operator of the Oschatz–Mügeln–Kemmlitz/Glossen narrow gauge line in central Saxony.

== History ==
In November 1993 the newly founded Döllnitzbahn GmbH took over the remaining lines of the Mügeln railway network between Oschatz, Mügeln and Kemmlitz. The primary aim of the company was initially the preservation of the remaining goods traffic from the kaolin mine at Kemmlitz. For that purpose used narrow gauge goods wagons were bought from the Mansfeld mining railway and a new transshipment site to the standard gauge railway network was built in Oschatz. With the help of used PKP diesel locomotives, they succeeded initially in keeping the goods traffic going. In spite of this, the demand gradually fell so that goods services had to be closed in 2001. The Döllnitzbahn was the last narrow gauge railway in Saxony to run public freight services.

Today only school trains and steam-hauled 'specials' run on the Döllnitzbahn railway, e.g. for touristic purposes. There is a local private association responsible for the organisation of respective events.

== Fleet List ==
=== Steam Locomotives ===
Identity	Other Number(s)	Railway	Builder	Works Number	Build year	Wheel Arrangement	Notes	Image
99 561	99 1561-2		Sächsische Maschinenfabrik; Rebuilt Raw Görlitz		1909	B'B' n4vt	Saxon IV K	
99 574	99 1574-5		Sächsische Maschinenfabrik; Rebuilt Raw Görlitz		1912	B'B' n4vt	Saxon IV K	
99 584	99 1584-4		Sächsische Maschinenfabrik; Rebuilt Raw Görlitz		1898	B'B' n4vt	Sächsische IV K, Recommissioning 2018	

=== Diesel Locomotives & Railcars ===
Identity	Other Number(s)	Railway	Builder	Works Number	Build year	Wheel Arrangement	Notes	Image
199 030	ÖBB 2091.010	BBÖ	Simmeringer Maschinen- und Waggonbaufabrik/Siemens-Schuckert		1940	1'Bo1'	BBÖ 2041/s	
199 031	ÖBB 2091.012	BBÖ	Simmeringer Maschinen- und Waggonbaufabrik/Siemens-Schuckert		1940	1'Bo1'	BBÖ 2041/s, from Öchsle-Schmalspurbahn	
199 032	199 008	DR	Lokomotivbau Karl Marx		1954	C	LKM Type Ns4	
199 034			23 August Works		1981	C dh	L30H	
VT 137 515	5090.015	NÖVOG	Jenbacher Werke		1995	B'B'	StLB VT 31–35/ÖBB 5090 class	
