= Schwarzbach railway =

Railway line in Germany

Goßdorf-Kohlmühle–Hohnstein (Sächs Schweiz)

Overview
- Line number: Saxon KH

Service
- Route number: 165f (1951)

Technical
- Line length: 12.133 km (7.539 mi)
- Track gauge: 750 mm (2 ft 5 1/2 in)
- Minimum radius: 100 m (328 ft)
- Operating speed: 30 km/h (19 mph) max.
- Maximum incline: 3.3 %

The Schwarzbach railway (German: Schwarzbachbahn, pronounced [ˈʃvaʁtsbaxˌbaːn]) was a 750 mm (2 ft 5 1/2 in) Saxon narrow-gauge railway in Saxon Switzerland. It began in Goßdorf-Kohlmühle station on the Sebnitz Valley railway and ran along the valley of the Schwarzbach to Hohnstein.

== Overview ==
The line was opened in 1897 and closed and dismantled in 1951 in order to supply material for the Berlin Outer Ring.

Since 1995 the Schwarzbachbahn Society has endeavoured to rebuild a section of the line and run it as a museum railway. The former station ins Lohsdorf has been redecorated and new tracks laid there, which should reach Ehrenberg until 2026. The society has its headquarters in the station building at Goßdorf-Kohlmühle.

Permission for the reconstruction of the railway between Goßdorf-Kohlmühle and Lohsdorf has been refused by the authorities, fearing damage to the environment.

Instead of the tracks, there is now a hiking trail, which also passes through the two old tunnels.

== Sources ==
- Wolfram Wagner, Wolfgang König: Die Geschichte der Schmalspurbahn Goßdorf-Kohlmühle–Hohnstein 1897–1951. 2. überarbeitete Auflage. Deutscher Modelleisenbahnverband der DDR, Dresden 1984.
- Karlheinz Uhlemann: Die ehemalige Schmalspurbahn Goßdorf-Kohlmühle–Hohnstein. In: Mitteilungen des Landesvereins Sächsischer Heimatschutz Heft 3/2007, ISSN 0941-1151, S. 39–44.
- Matthias Hengst: Frühere sächsische Schmalspurbahnen nördlich der Elbe. Bufe-Fachbuch-Verlag, Egglham 1995, ISBN 3-922138-56-X.
- Erich Preuß, Reiner Preuß: Schmalspurbahnen in Sachsen. transpress Verlag, Stuttgart 1998, ISBN 3-613-71079-X.
- Rainer Preuß, Erich Preuß: Schmalspurbahnen der Oberlausitz. transpress VEB Verlag für Verkehrswesen, Berlin 1980, ohne ISBN.
- Klaus Kieper, Rainer Preuß: Schmalspurbahnarchiv. transpress VEB Verlag für Verkehrswesen, Berlin 1980, ohne ISBN.
- Rolf Böhm: Wanderkarte der Sächsischen Schweiz – Brand-Hohnstein 1:10.000. Verlag Rolf Böhm, Bad Schandau, 1993 (2. Auflage 2000, ISBN 3-910181-06-6).
