= Sornzig-Ablaß =

- Municipality
- Coat of arms
- Interactive map of Sornzig-Ablaß
- Location within Germany Location within Saxony
- Coordinates: 51°13′N 13°1′E
- Country: Germany
- State: Saxony
- District: Nordsachsen
- Disbanded: 1 January 2011

Area
  - Total: 31.89 km^{2} (12.31 sq mi)
- Elevation: 190 m (620 ft)

Population (2009-12-31)
  - Total: 2,260
  - Density: 70.9/km^{2} (184/sq mi)
- Time zone: UTC+01:00 (CET)
  - Summer (DST): UTC+02:00 (CEST)
- Postal codes: 04769
- Dialling codes: 034362, 034364
- Vehicle registration: TDO
- Website: www.sornzig-ablass.de

Sornzig-Ablaß is a former municipality in the district Nordsachsen, in Saxony, Germany. It was established in 1994 by the merger of the former municipalities Sornzig and Ablaß. On 1 January 2011, it was absorbed into the town Mügeln. Its 19 Ortsteile became Ortsteile of Mügeln.
