= Schönheide =

- Municipality
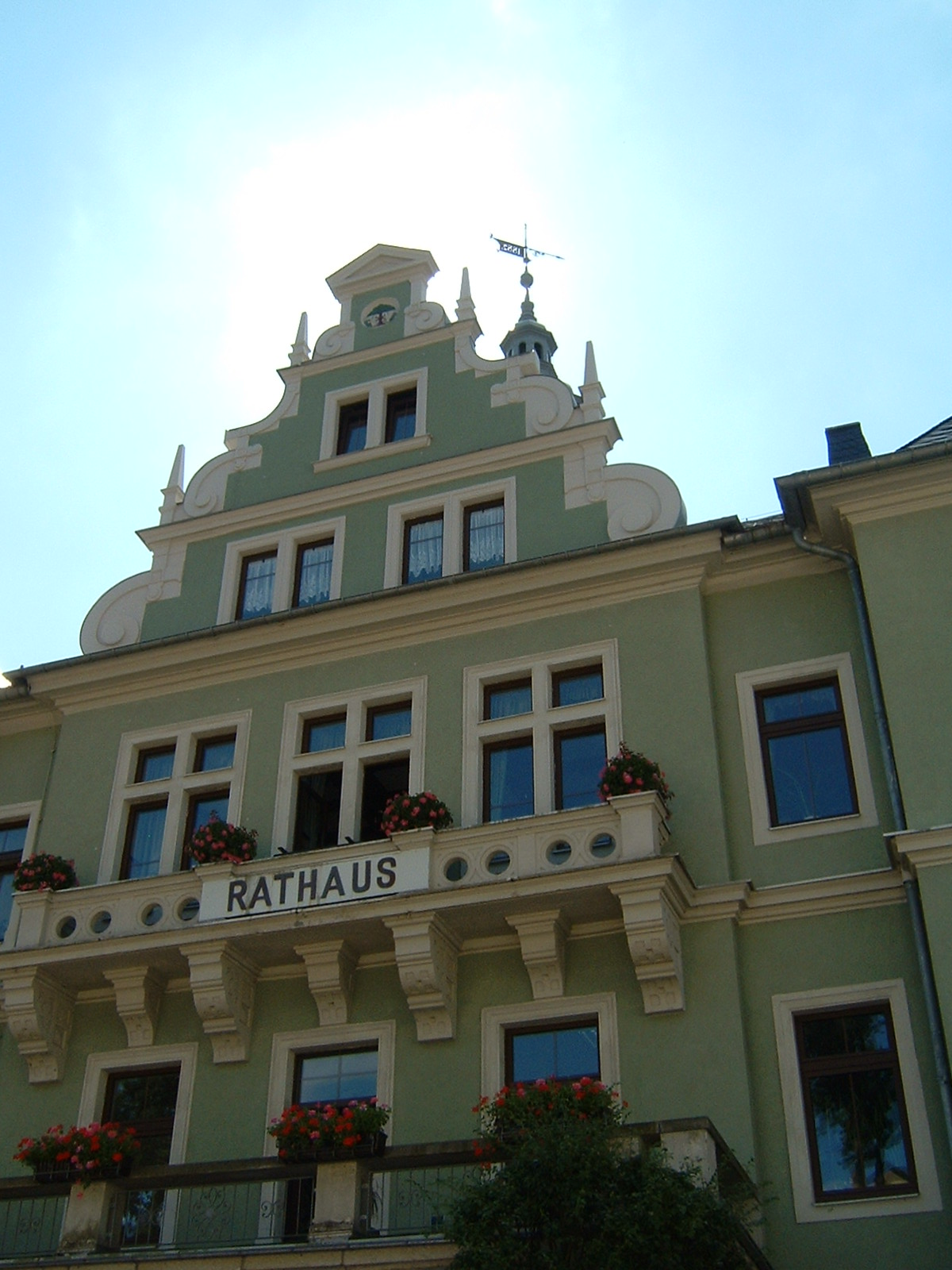
- Town hall Schönheide

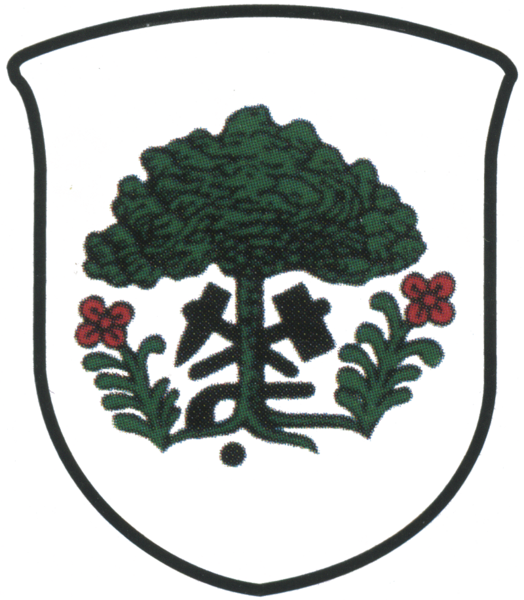
- Coat of arms

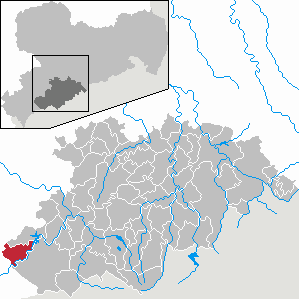
- Location of Schönheide within Erzgebirgskreis district
- Interactive map of Schönheide
- Location within Germany Location within Saxony
- Coordinates: 50°30′13″N 12°31′25″E
- Country: Germany
- State: Saxony
- District: Erzgebirgskreis

Government
  - Mayor (2022–29): Thomas Lang

Area
  - Total: 28.10 km^{2} (10.85 sq mi)
- Elevation: 700 m (2,300 ft)

Population (2025-12-31)
  - Total: 3,964
  - Density: 141.1/km^{2} (365.4/sq mi)
- Time zone: UTC+01:00 (CET)
  - Summer (DST): UTC+02:00 (CEST)
- Postal codes: 08304
- Dialling codes: 037755
- Vehicle registration: ERZ, ANA, ASZ, AU, MAB, MEK, STL, SZB, ZP

Schönheide is a municipality in Saxony's district of Erzgebirgskreis. It lies in the western Ore Mountains, and was founded as an industrial village.

== Geography ==
Schönheide is five kilometres long, and lies in the west of the District of Aue-Schwarzenberg, mostly in a side valley of the River Zwickauer Mulde, which forms the community's southern boundary. In the north lies Stützengrün, in the east and southeast Eibenstock, in the west Auerbach and Rodewisch, and in the northwest Steinberg.

Schönheide has four subdistricts, namely: Schönheide, Schwarzwinkel, Neuheide and Wilzschhaus. Schönheide is further subdivided into Oberdorf, Heinzwinkel, Mitteldorf, Webersberg and Schönheiderhammer. Wilzschaus lies in the valley of the River Mulde.

The highest point is der Knock at 767m.

== History ==
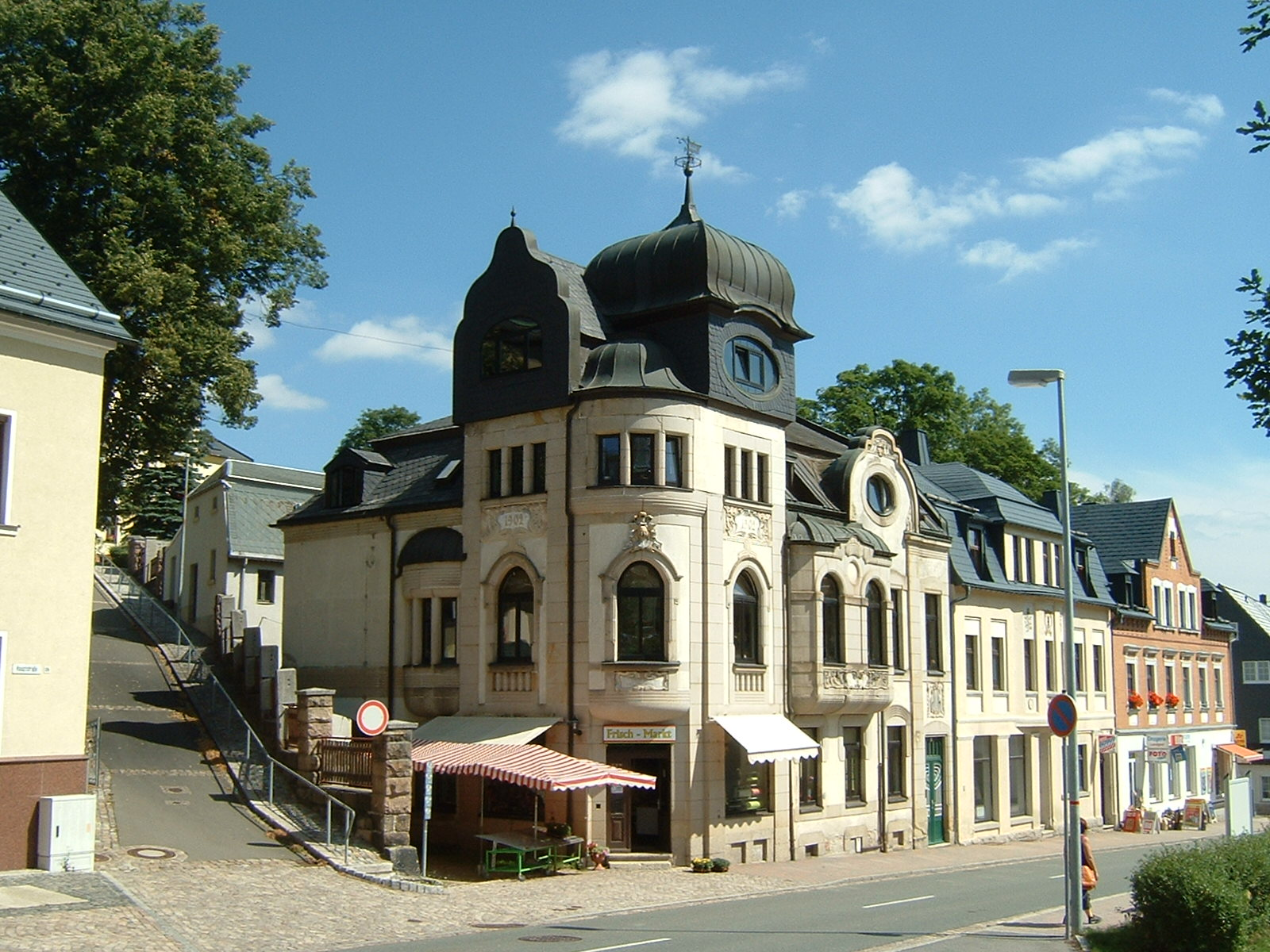
house on Main street

The first settler recorded in the Schönheide area was Urban Männel, who was mentioned during a regal visit of 1537. Five years later, twelve settlers were listed in the Fürstenverzeichnis directory of Schneeberg. Subsequently in 1549, the village of Schönheide was granted its charter with 20 homesteads.

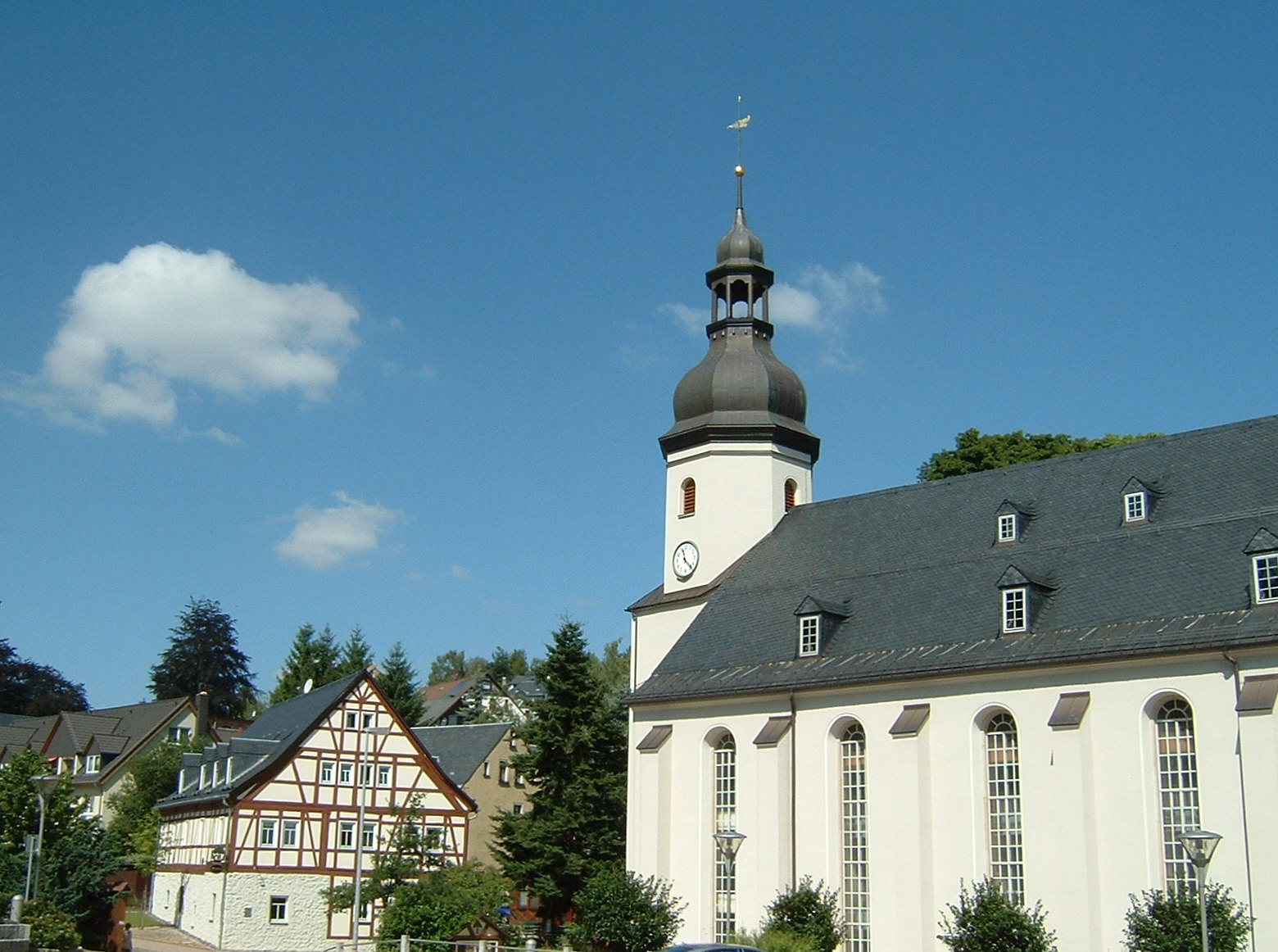
Church and Brushmuseum from 1773

In 1563, the village was sold to the House of Wettin. In 1566, its ironworks was founded, and is still in operation. In 1596, the first church was built, but its tower collapsed in 1764, and killed a man. In 1669, a craftsmen's guild was founded.

The village was connected to the railway at Schönheiderhammer and Wilzschhaus when the Chemnitz-Aue-Adorf railway line was built. Between 1880 and 1900, a number of public buildings were erected, and are still standing, including the Town Hall (1882), Post Office (1891), Hauptschule (1856–98), Flemmings Fabrik - factory (1896) and Lenks Villen - villas (ca 1900). In 1893, the construction of the Wilkau-Haßlau to Carlsfeld narrow-gauge railway led to the opening of three additional railway stations.

From 1914 to 1945 there was widespread joblessness and poverty throughout the Ore Mountains and Schönheide was no exception, due to the impact of both World Wars and the intervening Great Depression.

From 1952 to 1990, Schönheide was part of the Bezirk Karl-Marx-Stadt of East Germany. In 1974, construction of the Eibenstock Reservoir was commenced and flooded the railway line between Blauenthal and Schönheide Ost. The following year the narrow-gauge railway was abandoned, and only a short stretch has been retained as a museum piece.

Since German Reunification in 1990, the infrastructure of the village has been renewed. However many businesses have also closed, and joblessness is high once more.

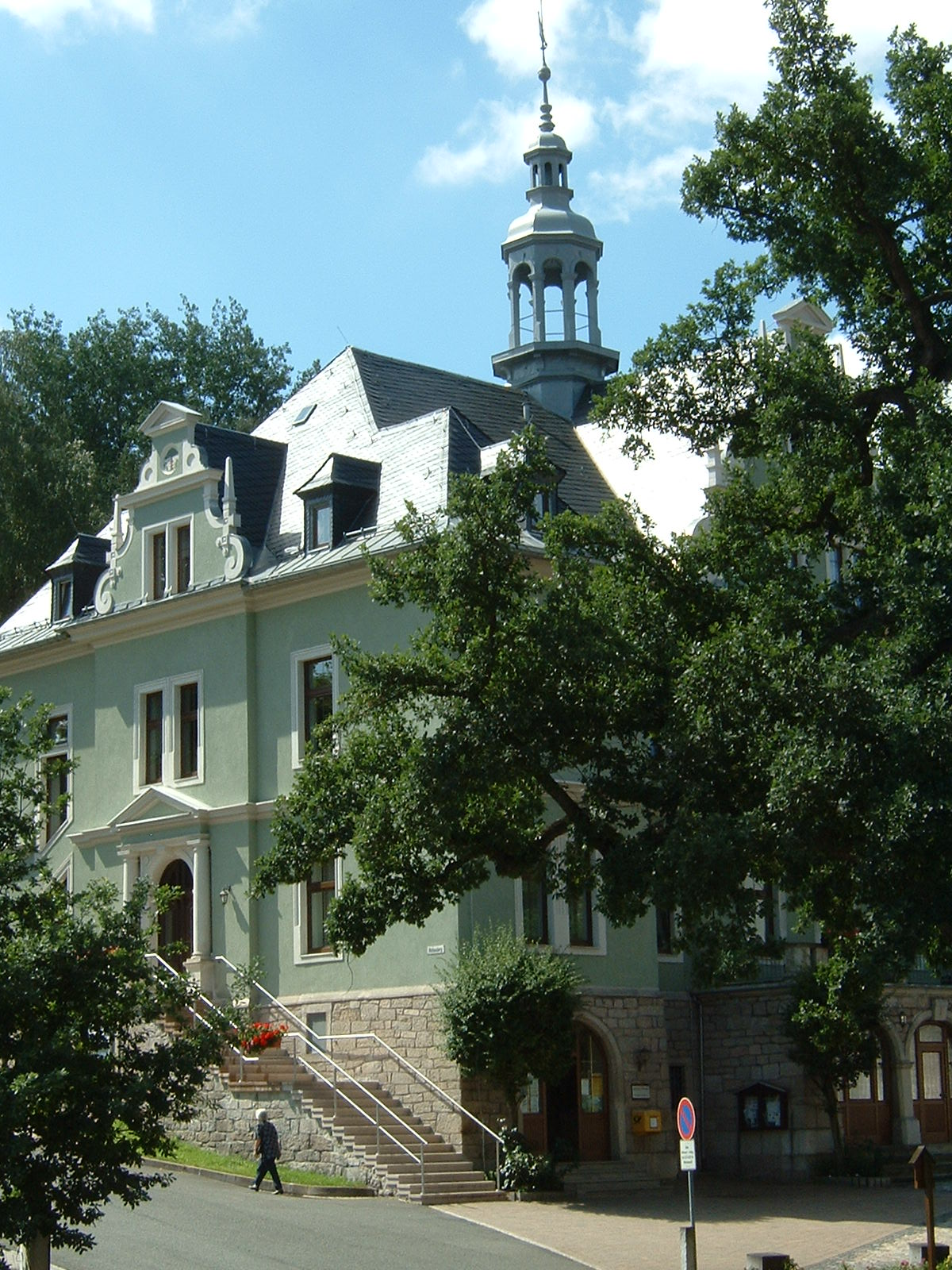
Townhall (rear entrance)

== Population ==
Estimated population (31 December, source: Statistisches Landesamt des Freistaates Sachsen):

Historical population
Year	Pop.	±%
1960	8,980	—
1998	5,786	−35.6%
1999	5,740	−0.8%
2000	5,662	−1.4%
2001	5,556	−1.9%
2002	5,451	−1.9%
2003	5,381	−1.3%
2004	5,351	−0.6%
2005	5,316	−0.7%
2006	5,283	−0.6%

== Politics ==
Since the 1994 municipal elections, the CDU has had ten seats, the UWG (de) four, the PDS two and the SPD one.

Schönheide maintains partnership agreements with Bad Rappenau, Beerfelden, Sulzbach (Taunus) and Nüdlingen, of which the one with Sulzbach is probably the most active.

== Entertainments ==
Notable places to visit include:

- Bürsten- und Heimatmuseum.
- Railway Museum.
- Am Knock.

Sporting facilities include:

- “Waldstadion” artificial turf stadium.
- Multifunctional clubhouse at the “Waldstadion”.
- Schönheide ice stadium.
- “Wolfsbau” ice sport venue.

== Festivals ==
Every year in early September, the Bürstenfest (“Brush Festival”) is held, and in July there is a street festival in the Hauptstraße, which is closed for the occasion. Every year on the second weekend in October, there is also a Kermis (“Church Festival or Fete”), and in mid-August there is a Firefighters’ Family Festival held by the Schönheide volunteer fire brigade. The Heimatmuseum also regularly stages its own festivals.

The local business association organizes a Spring Festival (Frühlingsfest) from 30 April to 1 May, and, since 2006, cooperates with the business associations of neighbouring communities to hold an annual exhibition of local businesses, which is shared among them.

== Transport ==
Until 1975, the community was connected by rail through the Chemnitz-Aue-Adorf railway and the Wilkau-Haßlau–Carlsfeld narrow-gauge railway. Today the most important connecting route is the Bundesstraße 283 highway in the Mulde Valley.

== Notable people ==
- Karl Emanuel Klitzsch (1812–1889) – Organist and composer (de).
- Louis Tuchscherer (1847–1922) – automobile inventor (de).
- Ottomar von Mayenburg (1865–1932) – Inventor of "Chlorodont", the first commercial brand of toothpaste (de).
- Hanno Drechsler (1931–2003) – Chief mayor and honorary citizen of Marburg
