= Mügeln =

- Town
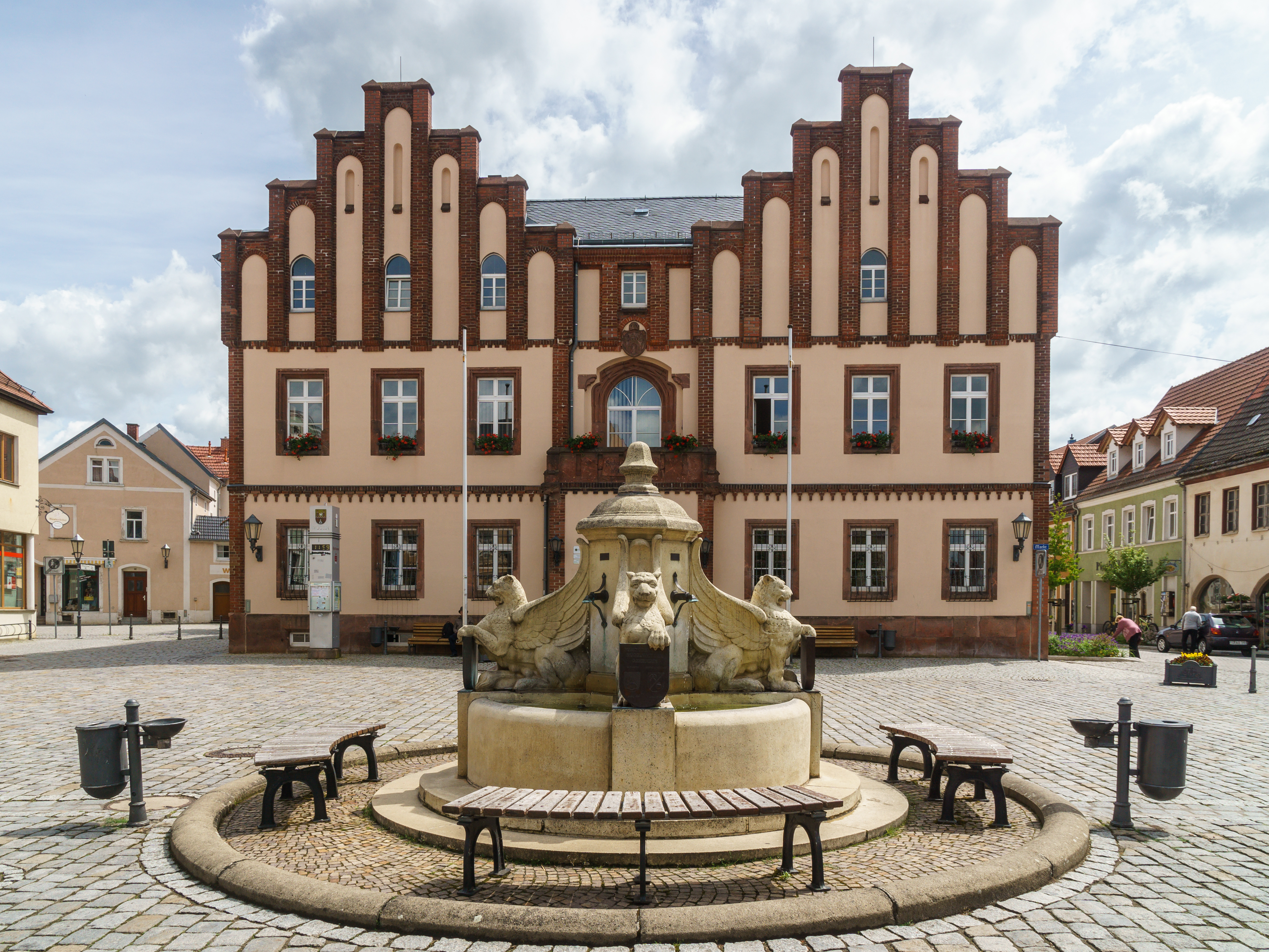
- Mügeln town hall

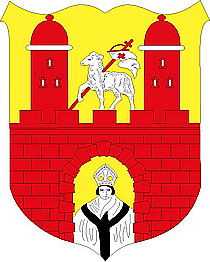
- Coat of arms

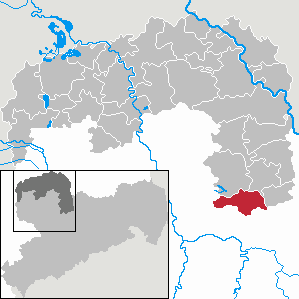
- Location of Mügeln within Nordsachsen district
- Interactive map of Mügeln
- Location within Germany Location within Saxony
- Coordinates: 51°14′N 13°3′E
- Country: Germany
- State: Saxony
- District: Nordsachsen

Government
  - Mayor (2022–29): Johannes Ecke (Independent)

Area
  - Total: 55.08 km^{2} (21.27 sq mi)
- Elevation: 157 m (515 ft)

Population (2025-12-31)
  - Total: 5,474
  - Density: 99.38/km^{2} (257.4/sq mi)
- Time zone: UTC+01:00 (CET)
  - Summer (DST): UTC+02:00 (CEST)
- Postal codes: 04769
- Dialling codes: 034362
- Vehicle registration: TDO, DZ, EB, OZ, TG, TO
- Website: www.stadt-muegeln.de

Mügeln (German pronunciation: [ˈmyːɡl̩n]) is a town in the district Nordsachsen, in Saxony, Germany. It is located 9 km southwest of Oschatz and 14 km northwest of Döbeln. The town has a population of approximately 5,808 people.

== Geography ==
Mügeln lies almost equidistant between Leipzig and Dresden at a distance of approximately 50 km from each town. Mügeln is not directly situated on any main traffic routes, but 10 km south of Mügeln one encounters the A14 motorway, and 10 km to the north one encounters the B6 federal highway, close to Oschatz. In addition, there is a tourist narrow gauge railway, the Wild Robert (Wilder Robert) which is operated by the Döllnitzbahn company as one of its attractions. The nearest railway station is in Oschatz.

The comparatively flat countryside around Mügeln is mostly used for agriculture, and comprises moderately large fields for the growing of crops. A number of man-made lakes are an occasional feature, the largest of which is situated in and around a forested area of some 30 km/sq, less than 7.0 km to the north-west. The forested area effectively surrounds the neighbouring village of Wermsdorf on all sides except the south which faces towards Mügeln. Wermsdorf has a quarry to the north-east of its boundary, and well maintained historical buildings to visit.

In 1994 Mügeln became part of the district Torgau-Oschatz, which was merged into the new district Nordsachsen in 2011. Mügeln absorbed the former municipalities Altmügeln, Crellenhain, Berntitz and Schlagwitz in 1959, Schweta in 1994 and Sornzig-Ablaß in 2011.

== History ==
The first historical record of Mügeln is in a document of 984 AD. The population was predominantly Sorbian at that time. In 1064, Mügeln came into the possession of the Bishop of Meissen, and in 1256 Mügeln was awarded the right to hold a market.

- 1261: The Castle of Ruhethal (Schloss Ruhethal) was built
- 1325: The Sorbian language was outlawed
- 1429: Destruction of Mügeln by the Hussites
- 1542: The first Lutheran service was held in Mügeln
- 1561: Bishop Johann IX of Meissen and of Haugwitz granted the town an escort and a bridge right
- 1581: Bishop Johann IX, the last Catholic bishop of Meissen converted to the Lutheran Protestantism. He lived in Mügeln and got the Castle of Ruhethal and the former cloister of Marienthal in Sornzig, as a “life annuity” for use.
- 1618-1648: During the Thirty Years' War, Mügeln was plundered by Swedish troops and most of its inhabitants fell victim to a plague epidemic. Only 67 inhabitants of the approximately 700 inhabitants survived.
- 1735: the town privileges were expanded, it got the upper and hereditary courts (Ober- und Erbgerichte) by decree of the Electoral office (kurfürstliches Amt).
- 1834: The last town-gate was removed.
- 1875: Mügeln was assigned to the administrative district Oschatz (Amtshauptmannschaft Oschatz)
- 1884: The narrow-gauge railway connecting Mügeln with Döbeln, Oschatz and Wermsdorf was opened
- 1945: In April the town was occupied by Soviet troops
- 1968 - 1975: The narrow gauge railway was gradually shut down. First of all, the section between Mügeln and Döbeln, then the section between Mügeln and Wermsdorf. (From 1975 to 1995 the remaining section was only used for the transport of goods.)
- 1995: Passenger traffic on the narrow-gauge railway: the Mügeln-Oschatz section was resumed

=== Mügeln mob attack ===
On August 19, 2007, eight Indian citizens were chased through the town and beaten. The assailants were a large group of predominantly German youths. The incident received worldwide media attention, which was particularly disturbing and unwelcome because of the participation of some of the public in what could be rightly compared to little better than spectators seeking entertainment by encouraging the assailants to continue their assault.

The incident occurred during a town celebration in Mügeln, and although the motives were never ascertained, racism is thought to be at the root of the trouble. One of the victims has accused the police of brutality. A preliminary investigation has been launched against two of those believed to be responsible for the assault, and the German Federal Government has vowed to increase its efforts to thwart right-wing extremism.

== Twin towns ==
Mügeln is twinned with:

- Bodman-Ludwigshafen, Germany, since 2000

== Personalities ==
- Heinrich von Mügeln (fl. 14th century), author of Middle High German Minneliedern, poems, fables, chronicles and sayings; his name is derived from the town but he lived elsewhere in Saxony,
- John IX of Haugwitz, the last Bishop of Meissen, lived here.

== Sites of interest ==
- The Castle of Ruhethal (Schloss Ruhethal)
- Narrow gauge railway of Wild Robert (Wilder Robert)
- Monument to Heinrich von Mügeln in the old market of Joachim Zehme (2005)

== See also ==
- Mügeln railway network
- Döllnitzbahn
