= Kirchberg, Saxony =

Kirchberg
- Town
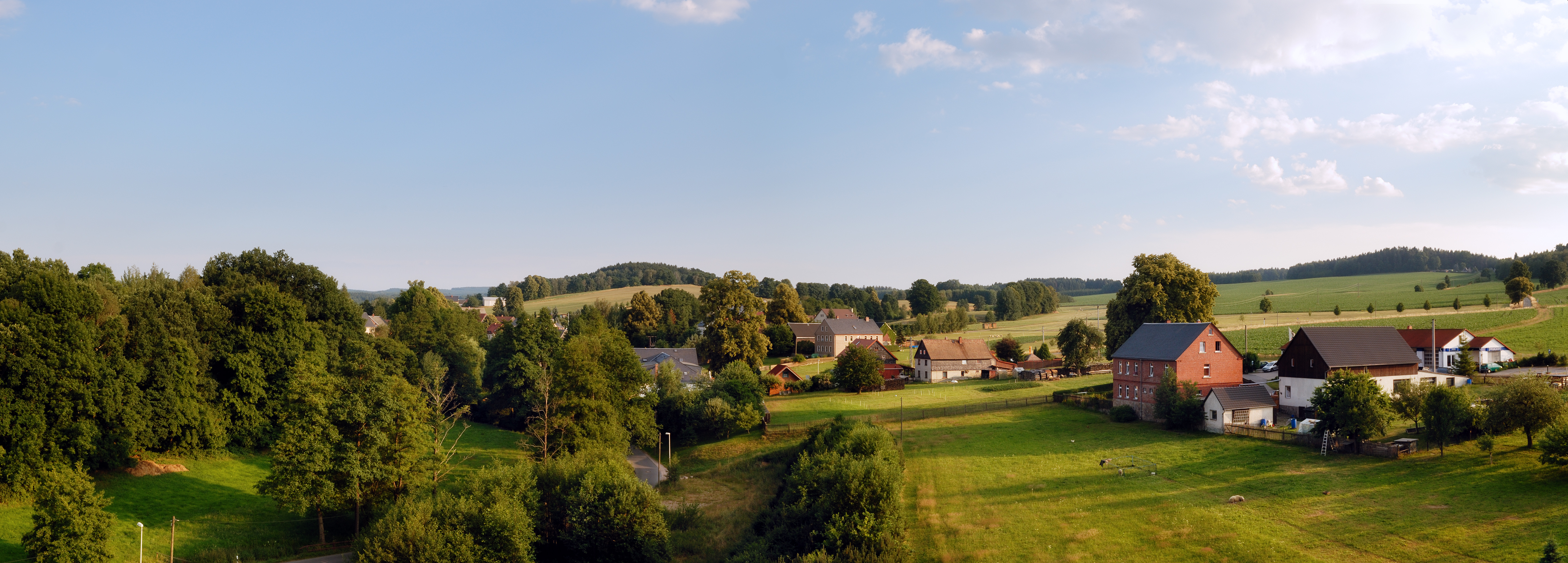
- Panorama of Kirchberg

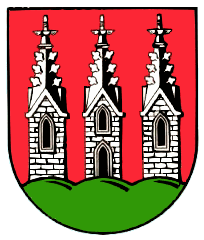
- Coat of arms

- Location of Kirchberg within Zwickau district
- Interactive map of Kirchberg
- Location within Germany Location within Saxony
- Coordinates: 50°37′20″N 12°31′32″E
- Country: Germany
- State: Saxony
- District: Zwickau

Government
  - Mayor (2020–27): Dorothee Obst

Area
  - Total: 39.57 km^{2} (15.28 sq mi)
- Elevation: 349 m (1,145 ft)

Population (2025-12-31)
  - Total: 7,621
  - Density: 192.6/km^{2} (498.8/sq mi)
- Time zone: UTC+01:00 (CET)
  - Summer (DST): UTC+02:00 (CEST)
- Postal codes: 08107
- Dialling codes: 37602
- Vehicle registration: Z
- Website: www.kirchberg.de

Kirchberg (German pronunciation: [ˈkɪʁçbɛʁk]) is a town in the Zwickau district, in Saxony, Germany. It is situated at the western part of the Ore Mountains, 11 km south of Zwickau.

== Notable people ==
- Christoph Graupner (1683–1760), musician and composer. The high school in Kirchberg is named after him.
- Robert Seidel (1850–1933), politician, took part in the founding congress of the SPD. There is a street named after him in Kirchberg.
