= Freital East-Possendorf railway line =

Branch line near Dresden in Saxony

Freital Ost–Possendorf railway line
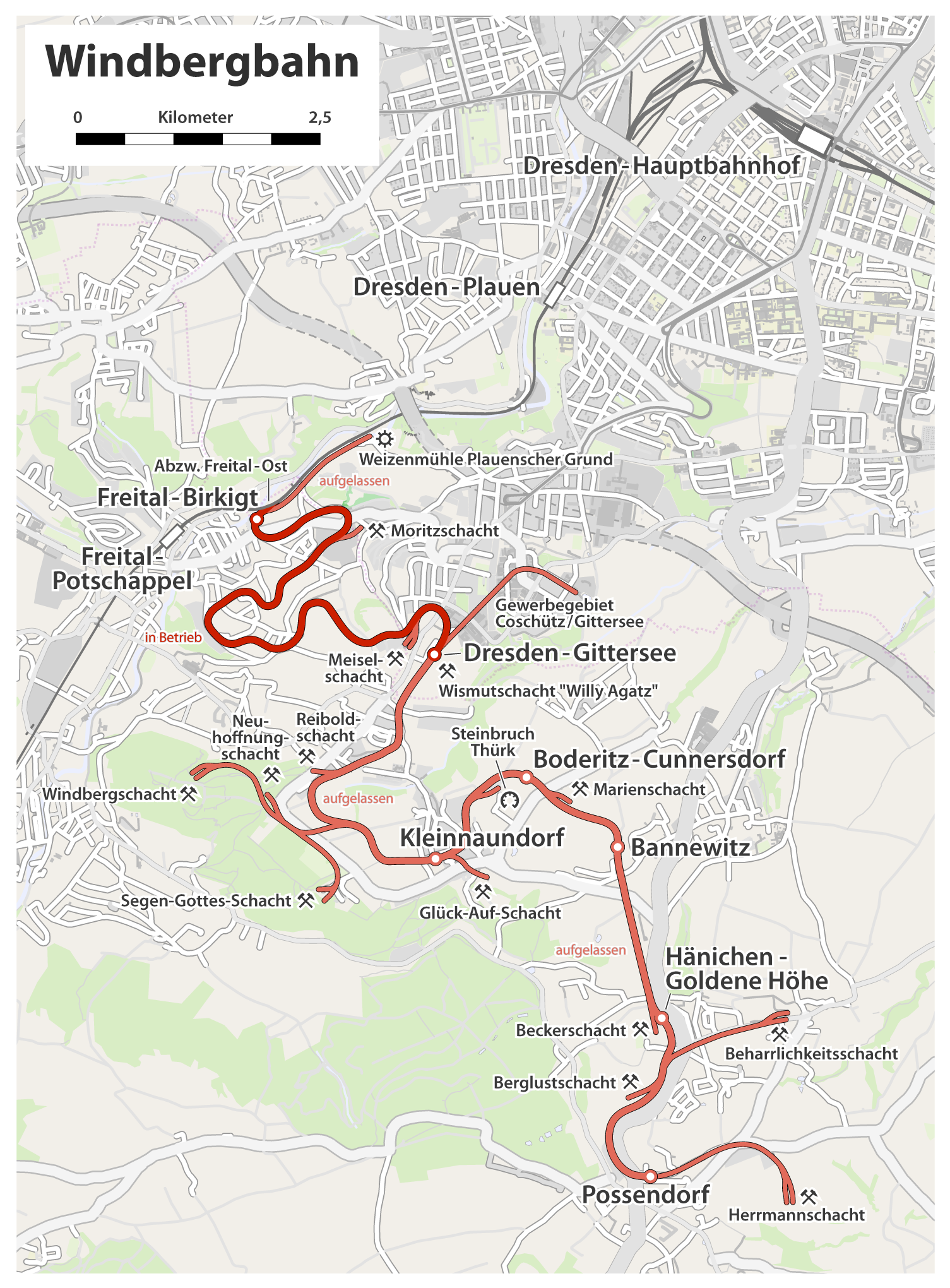

Technical
- Line length: 13,266 km (8,243 mi)
- Track gauge: 1435
- Minimum radius: 85 m (279 ft)
- Maximum incline: 25

The Freital East–Possendorf railway line is a standard-gauge branch line near Dresden in Saxony, considered one of Germany's earliest mountain railways. Built in 1856 by Albertsbahn AG as the Hänichener Kohlezweigbahn (Hänichen coal branch line), it transported hard coal from mines in Hänichen and at Windberg above Freital, a town founded in 1921. After conversion to a public line and extension to Possendorf, it became a popular excursion railway. The line is commonly known as the Windbergbahn, and historically as the Sächsische Semmeringbahn or Possendorfer Heddel.

The Possendorf section closed in 1951, and the remaining section was used until 1989, primarily for uranium ore transport by the Soviet-German Wismut company. Freight transport ceased in 1993. Since 2008, the railway facilities up to Dresden-Gittersee have been owned by the Saxon Museum Railway Association Windbergbahn e.V., which operates them as a museum railway.

Buildings and facilities along the route have been listed as cultural monuments since 1980 due to their significance in railway history.

== History ==
=== Background ===
The earliest evidence of coal mining in the Döhlen Basin dates to 1542. Industrialization in the early 19th century spurred larger-scale mining, with the first deep mining shafts constructed during this period. Coal was transported to Dresden via the Kohlenstraße (coal road), which ran from mining areas near Hänichen and Windberg through Coschütz to customers in Dresden.

In 1849, the Hänichener Steinkohlenbauverein (Hänichen Coal Mining Association), a joint-stock company, was established, owning the Beckerschacht, Beharrlichkeitsschacht, and Berglustschacht mines near Hänichen. In 1852, the association proposed a privately funded railway to improve transport conditions, with a route from Niedersedlitz on the Saxon-Bohemian State Railway through the Lockwitztal valley to Hänichen. The Saxon state denied the concession, prioritizing profitable main lines.

Mining companies and manufacturers in the Plauenscher Grund district also sought a railway connection. The Saxon state approved a line from Dresden to Tharandt, later part of a route to Freiberg and Chemnitz. On May 4, 1853, Albertsbahn AG was founded, and on June 28, 1855, its Dresden–Tharandt line opened. The concession included a potential branch line to Hänichen. On May 31, 1855, Albertsbahn AG contracted with the Hänichen Coal Mining Association to build a branch line to its mines near Hänichen.

=== Construction and opening ===
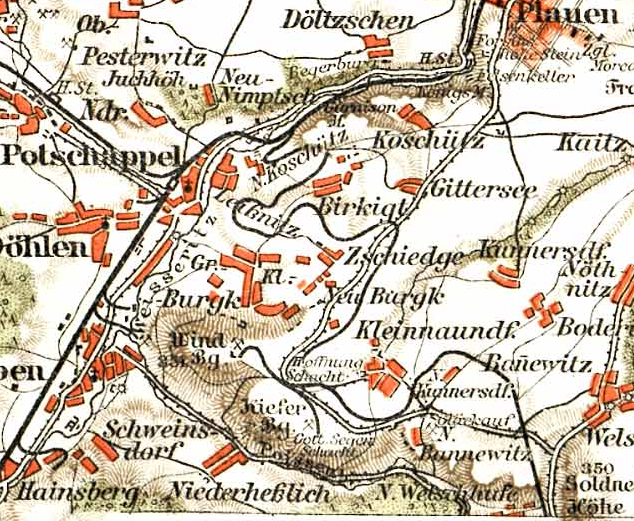
Route of the Hänichener Kohlezweigbahn on the Windberg

Railway engineer Guido Brescius, responsible for planning and construction, designed a pure adhesion railway with artificial curves on the Birkigter slope. Strategic route planning avoided expensive bridges and cuttings, and most mines connected via short branch lines.

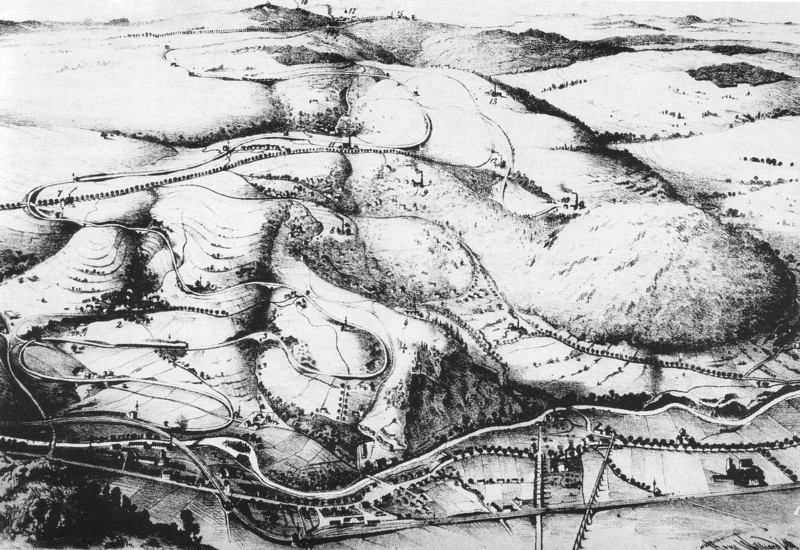
Guido Brescius's 1861 drawing of the route

Construction began in 1855 and progressed rapidly. On April 4, 1855, the junction switch to the Albertsbahn was installed in Dresden-Gittersee. On October 21, 1856, the line was completed and inspected by experts. In February and March 1857, Sächsische Maschinenfabrik in Chemnitz delivered three ordered locomotives.

On April 1, 1857, the first empty goods train ran from Dresden's coal port to Hänichen, returning with coal from the Hänichen Coal Mining Association, marking the start of operations for one of Germany's earliest mountain railways. On April 15, 1857, Saxon King Johann inspected the Hänichener Kohlezweigbahn. In a speech to Albertsbahn AG shareholders, he declared, "Well, gentlemen, now we are in no way inferior to the Austrians. We now have our own Semmering Railway, the Saxon Semmering Railway." The name Sächsische Semmeringbahn has since been used for the line.

=== In operation at Albertsbahn AG ===
The railway operated successfully from the start, with safe navigation of tight curves. However, limited rolling stock posed challenges in the early years. Until nationalization, Albertsbahn AG procured only 290 five-tonne mine cars for the Hänichen coal branch line, often insufficient. The Hänichen Coal Mining Association, a major shareholder, received preferential treatment for empty wagons.

From March 10, 1857, Albertsbahn AG offered Sunday excursion trips for the public, equipping coal wagons with benches. During this period, the Windbergbahn gained a notable reputation as an excursion railway.

=== After nationalization ===
The Albertsbahn concession, issued for 20 years until 1873, was nationalized after the German War of 1866, as Saxony sought to consolidate its railways. The planned Freiberg–Tharandt route aimed to connect the Eastern and Western State Railways. Albertsbahn AG, facing lower-than-expected profits, did not oppose nationalization. On July 1, 1868, it was acquired by the Saxon state for 2,862,800 talers. At nationalization, the Hänichen coal branch line had five locomotives and 290 five-tonne wagons, with a net capacity of 1,450 tonnes.

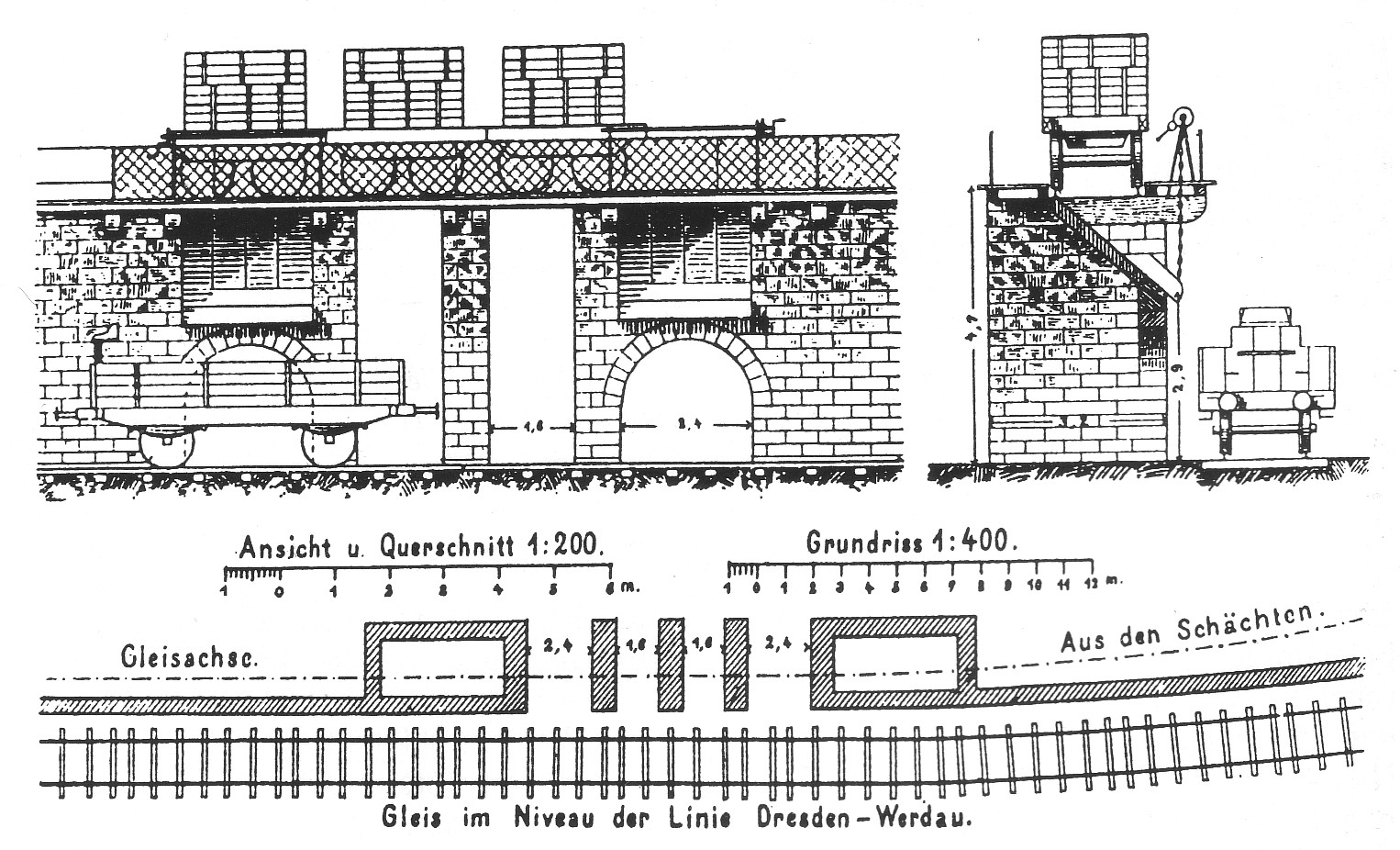
Diagram of the Dresden-Gittersee transhipment facility

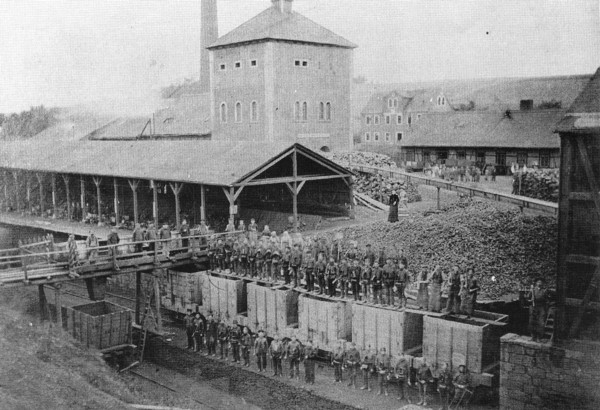
Beharrlichkeitsschacht in Rippien (1882)

In 1869, the Freiberg–Flöha gap closed, and the General Directorate of the Royal Saxon State Railways was established, opening new markets for Windberg coal. As Albertsbahn's five-tonne wagons were incompatible with state railway tracks, a transhipment facility was built in Dresden-Gittersee in 1870. In 1873, the state railway ordered 80 improved coal hoppers, unloadable from below, for the facility.

Coal tonnage declined significantly, from 171,000 tonnes in 1872 to 137,000 tonnes by 1878, due to depleting Windberg reserves. The Windbergschacht mine closed in 1877, followed soon after by the Neuhoffnungsschacht mine. In 1879, the Hänichen coal branch line was downgraded to a secondary railway.

In 1893–1894, the line was upgraded for heavier axle loads, allowing more powerful locomotives and standard ten-tonne freight wagons. Some five-tonne wagons remained in use past 1900.

=== The extension to Possendorf ===
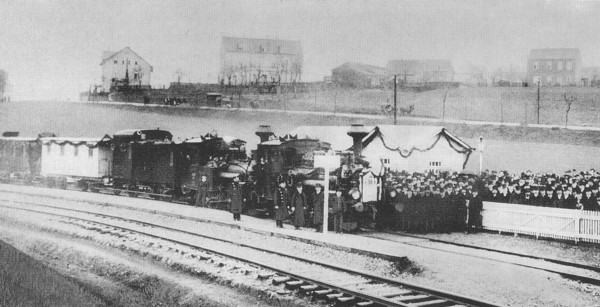
Opening procession for passenger services with two class VII T locomotives, September 21, 1907

By 1900, Hänichen coal deposits were exhausted. The Berglustschacht mine closed in 1905, followed by the remaining mines. On May 18, 1906, the Hänichener Steinkohlenbauverein was dissolved, leading to economic hardship in the region. Calls grew to extend the railway to Possendorf as a public transport line. On December 16, 1905, a decree for the coal railway's expansion was submitted to the Chamber of Deputies, and approved by year-end. In early 1906, the royal tax office allocated 490,000 marks, enabling construction.

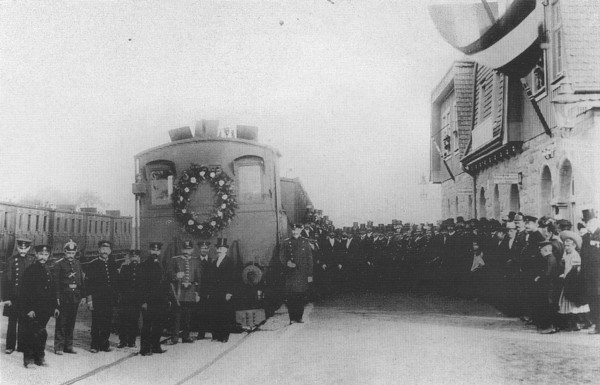
Possendorf extension opening, September 30, 1908

On September 12, 1907, renovation began during ongoing operations, renewing the entire line's superstructure and extending it to Possendorf. Tight radii, like the 85-meter curve at Geiersgraben, could not be widened without extensive rerouting. After 100 days, the upgraded line to Hänichen-Goldene Höhe opened to public transport by the Royal Saxon State Railways on December 21, 1907.

The Possendorf extension, over 1 km long, took nine months. On September 30, 1908, Possendorf's mayor opened the new section, with scheduled services from Dresden to Possendorf starting October 1, 1908. The line became a significant tourist railway in Saxony, supported by powerful locomotives and observation carriages before World War I.

=== In service with the Deutsche Reichsbahn until the end of the Second World War ===
On April 1, 1920, the Saxon State Railways joined the German Reichsbahn, with the Windbergbahn under the Dresden Directorate.

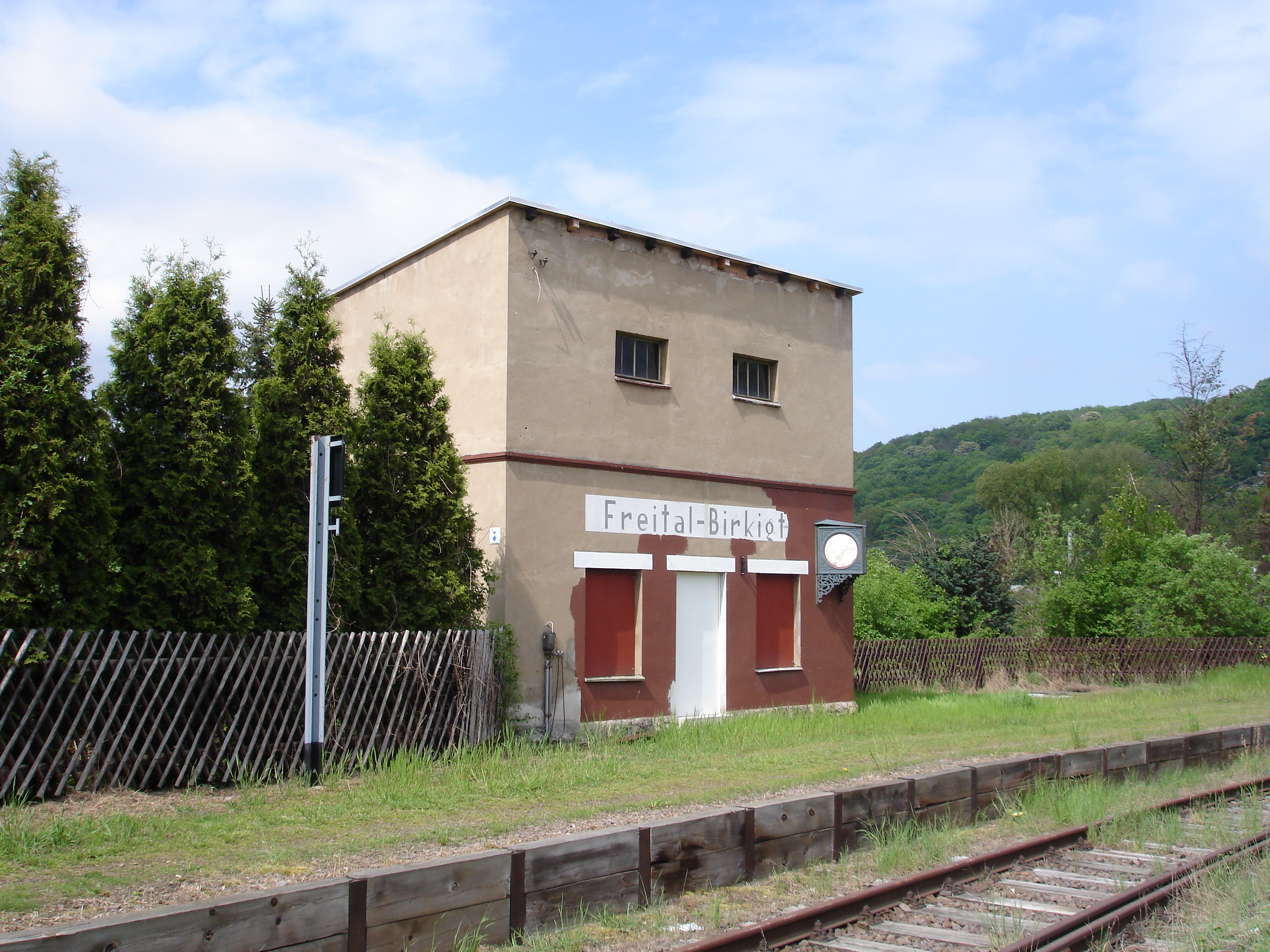
Freital-Birkigt water station, damaged in 1944 and rebuilt in simplified form

Coal transport declined as Windberg reserves depleted, with the last shafts closing in 1930. Traffic on the Windbergbahn fell to a minimum. A bus service on Bundesstraße 170, established in 1919, drew rush-hour passengers, but Sunday excursions remained popular.

From 1933, the Deutsche Reichsbahn used combustion railcars for off-peak services, discontinued in mid-1934 for unspecified reasons.

World War II restricted excursion traffic, with Sunday trains halted in 1943. The 1944 timetable listed only two-weekday train pairs, with no Sunday service.

=== After the Second World War ===
Windbergbahn traffic resumed on May 14, 1945, primarily for commuters, with one Sunday train pair. The lightly used Kleinnaundorf–Possendorf section was dismantled on April 20, 1951, to supply materials for the Berlin Outer Ring. The S33 rails were reused for the Frose–Quedlinburg line and replaced with S49 rails.

=== As an arch railway in the service of SDAG Wismut ===
In 1952, Wismut AG built an ore processing plant in Coschütz, enriching uranium ore from Saxony and Thuringia for Soviet export. Freight traffic on the Windbergbahn surged, with uphill ore trains from Freital-Potschappel divided at Freital-Birkigt and hauled by two steam locomotives.

The ore plant closed in 1965, shifting loads downhill. Coal from Gittersee became the primary cargo. From 1968, Wismut AG extracted uranium-bearing coal and transported it to Crossen and Seelingstädt. A Pneumant tyre factory, built on the former ore plant site, became a key customer. Freight to Kleinnaundorf ended in 1967, with the Dresden-Gittersee–Kleinnaundorf line dismantled by students in 1972–1974.

Due to deposit depletion, Wismut's Gittersee mines were set to close in 1989. In May 1987, the GDR Politburo planned a silicon plant for semiconductor production, using trichlorosilane delivered via the Windbergbahn from Nünchritz. The project halted on November 3, 1989, with the GDR's fall.

Freight transport for Coschütz/Gittersee customers ended on December 30, 1993.

=== New perspectives as a museum railway ===
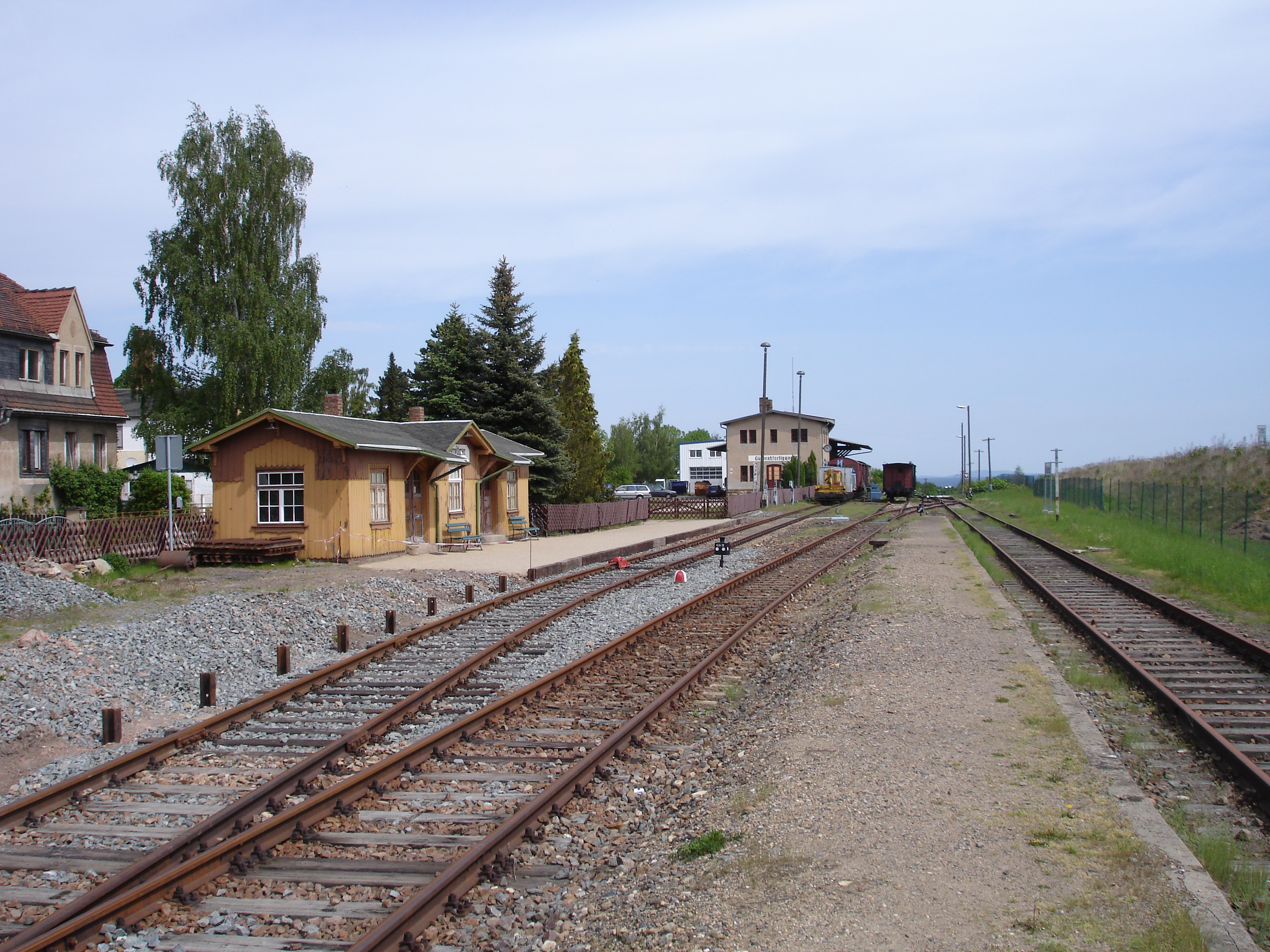
Dresden-Gittersee station (2009)

After the 1989–1990 changes in East Germany, the Windbergbahn Working Group became the Saxon Museum Railway Association Windbergbahn e.V., registered in the summer of 1991. Starting May 19, 1991, it organized special trips from Dresden Central Station to Dresden-Gittersee, the first passenger service since 1957. After freight ended in 1993, the association became the sole operator. The restored Windberg observation car returned to service in September 1997 after 14 years. In November 1998, superstructure damage limited trains to the Dresden-Gittersee station area.

Deutsche Bahn AG sought to close the Windbergbahn during the Dresden–Werdau line expansion post-1997. On May 2, 2002, the Federal Railway Authority rejected the closure, citing Deutsche Bahn's attempt to shift reconnection costs to buyers. The dispute settled on November 2, 2006, when Deutsche Bahn withdrew its appeal.

Deutsche Bahn offered the route for €113,000, plus €11,000 annually for the Freital Ost switch, but found no buyer by February 23, 2006.

In 1998, the Upper Elbe Transport Association marketed the Sebnitztalbahn as the Sächsische Semmeringbahn. In 2006, Windbergbahn e.V. registered Sächsische Semmeringbahn as a word mark with the German Patent and Trademark Office, restricting its commercial use to the Windbergbahn. This was criticized by regional media, the public, and the VVO. The Sebnitztalbahn is now marketed as the Saxon-Bohemian Semmering Railway.

After local proposals for a cycle path, Windbergbahn e.V. collected 4,743 signatures by May 25, 2008, and presented to Freital's town council on December 4, 2008, to preserve the railway.

On December 22, 2008, DB Netz AG and Windbergbahn e.V. signed a 20-year lease for the Freital Ost–Dresden-Gittersee line. On October 20, 2010, the Saxon State Ministry for Economic Affairs, Labour and Transport granted 50-year infrastructure operation approval.

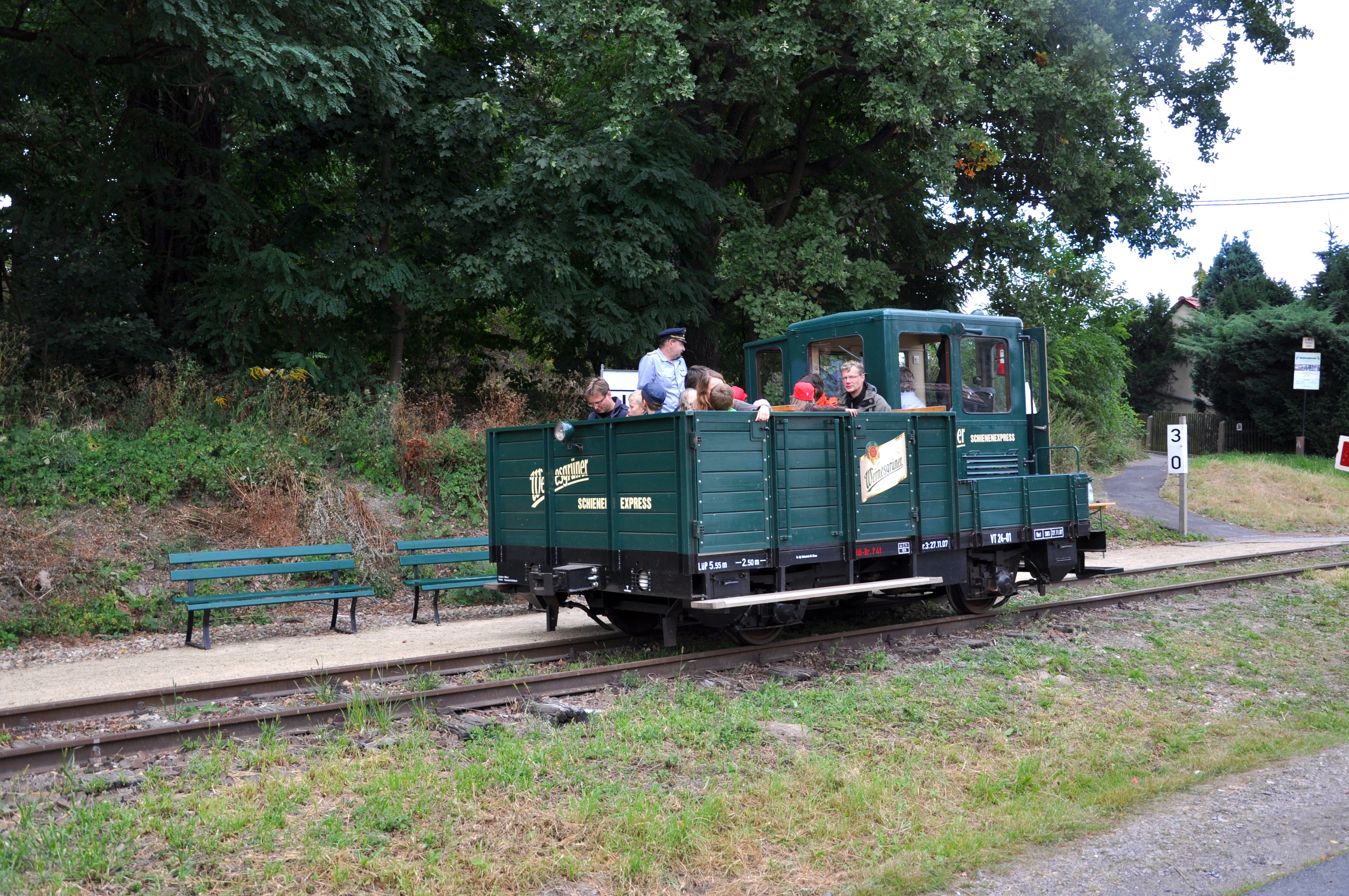
Wernesgrüner Rail Express (2013)

Track construction began in 2011. Reinstalling the Freital Ost branch point is planned, enabling direct services from Dresden Central Station to Gittersee. Long-term, the line may extend to Boderitz-Cunnersdorf (Marienschacht).

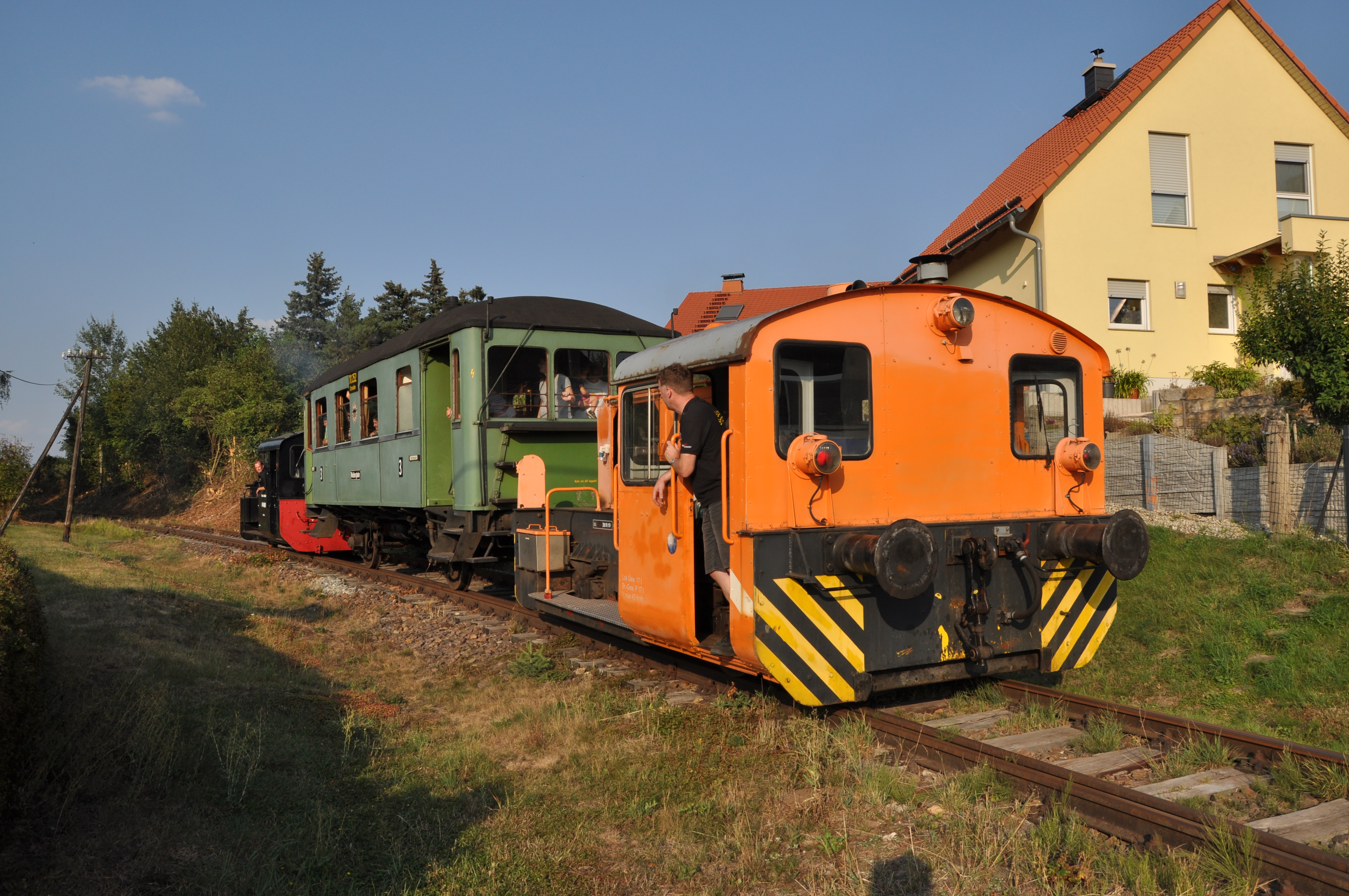
Museum train with Windberg observation car (2019)

Public rides resumed on August 31, 2019, after track repairs, using the Windberg observation car and two diesel locomotives, covering 1.5 km from Dresden-Gittersee. Since September 2, 2020, special services have reached km 3.55. About 60 meters of track at km 3.0 were redesigned, and the Leisnitz/Schloss Burgk stop was rebuilt. The first trip to this stop occurred on May 26, 2021, with guests. The association aims to reach Freital-Birkigt (km 0.4).

== Route description ==
=== Course ===
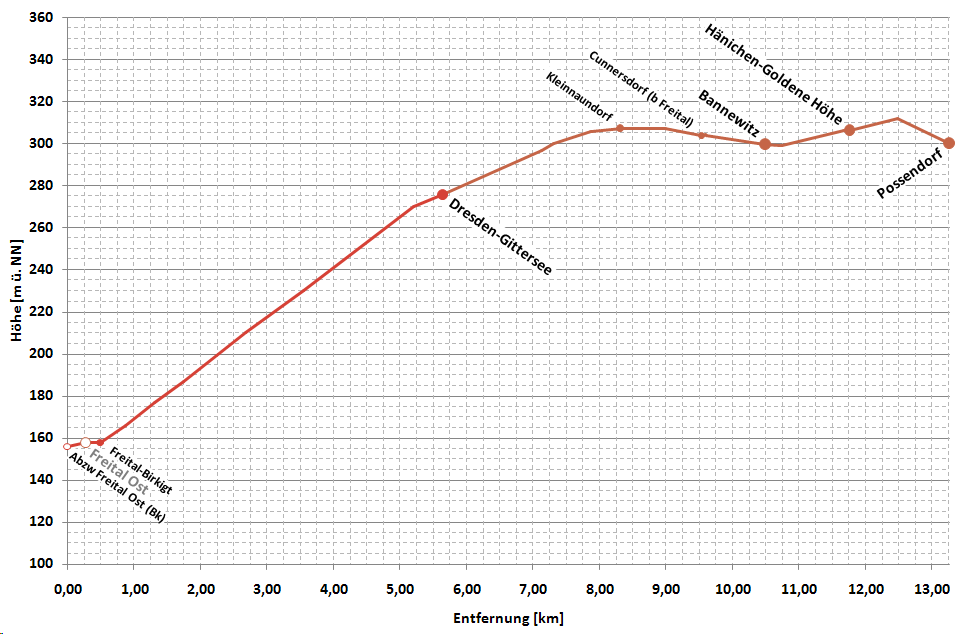
Simplified elevation profile of the Windbergbahn

The Windbergbahn begins at km 5.717 of the Dresden–Werdau railway, on the Dresden–Freital city limits. The Freital Ost freight station and Freital-Birkigt stop are at the junction. A 5-km ramp with a 25‰ gradient starts with a left-hand curve, continuing to Dresden-Gittersee station. The track winds uphill through Freital-Birkigt, with the tightest curve (85-meter radius) at Geiersgraben.

Beyond Dresden-Gittersee, the route climbs to the Windberg plateau, then runs level past Kleinnaundorf and Bannewitz to Hänichen. The final stretch to Possendorf descended slightly, paralleling Bundesstraße 170 (Dresden–Zinnwald), crossing it at grade before the terminus.

=== Operating locations ===
==== Freital East junction ====
The Windbergbahn starts at the former blocking point Freital Ost junction on the Dresden–Werdau railway. From 1912, it branched right, running parallel to the Tharandt freight line, passing under it at the Höllenmaul (Hell's Mouth). A track to Freital Ost station served freight. In 1946, the Deutsche Reichsbahn dismantled both branches as reparations for the Soviet Union. Trains used track 1, originally a connecting track to Freital-Potschappel. The Höllenmaul was filled in 1984 and demolished in 2003 during the Dresden–Werdau track expansion. No branch point has existed at Freital Ost since 2003.

==== Freital East freight yard ====
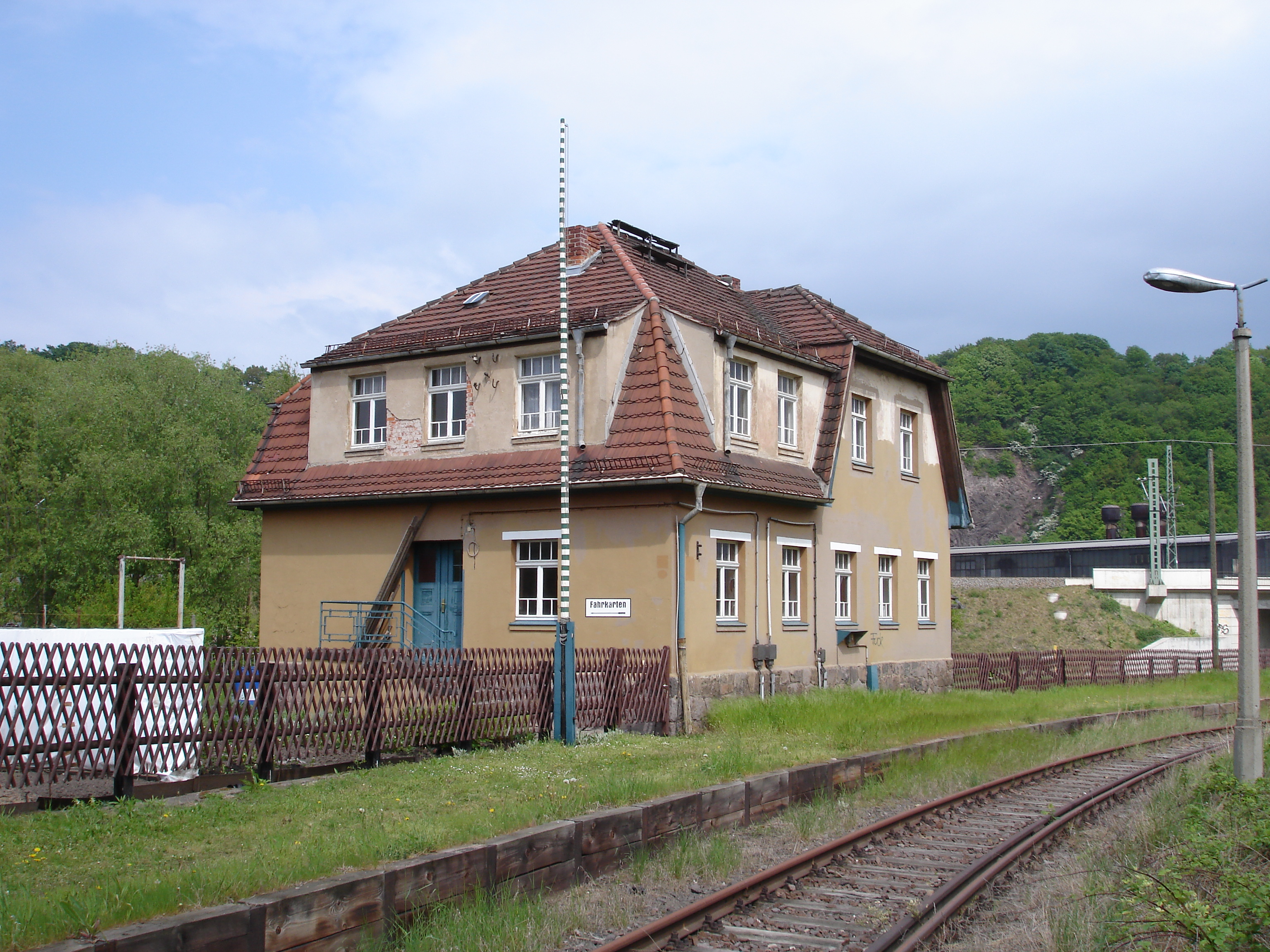
Freital-Birkigt stop (2009)

Freital Ost station, at the Dresden–Werdau junction, served freight, with passenger services at the nearby Freital-Birkigt stop. Originating as the Dresden-Gittersee transhipment station, it transferred coal to state railway wagons. A connecting track to the Plauenscher Grund wheat mill started here. After freight ended in 1993, facilities were partially dismantled. DB Netz AG lists it as Freital Ost Güteranlage.

==== Freital-Birkigt ====
The Freital-Birkigt stop (formerly Potschappel-Birkigt), established in 1907, lies on a curved track between the former Höllenmaul and Coschützer Straße crossing. It served commuters to nearby factories.

The water station was damaged in an August 24, 1944, air raid and rebuilt in modified form. Only the main track remains.

==== Dresden-Gittersee ====
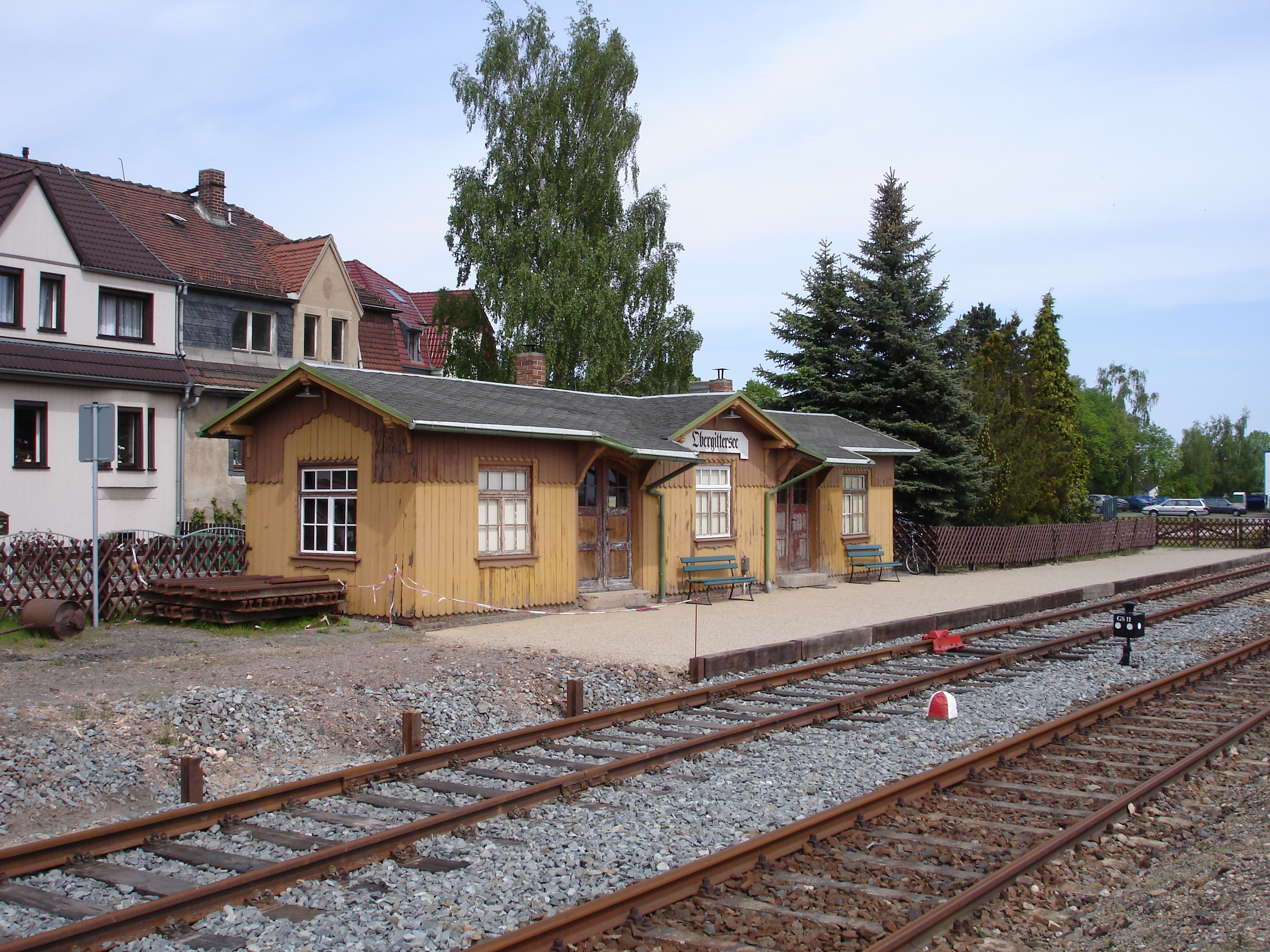
Dresden-Gittersee station

Dresden-Gittersee station (formerly Obergittersee) is the Windbergbahn's key operating point. From 1951, it hosted Wismut's Willy Agatz mine, generating freight until 1990. A connecting track served the VEB Reifenwerk Dresden tyre factory. Tracks and buildings remain original. Since 1988, the station has housed a Windbergbahn history museum.

Windbergbahn e.V. is converting the area into a museum railway station, planning to rebuild the toilet building and install mushroom lights. The station was designated a cultural monument on June 13, 2000.

==== Kleinnaundorf ====
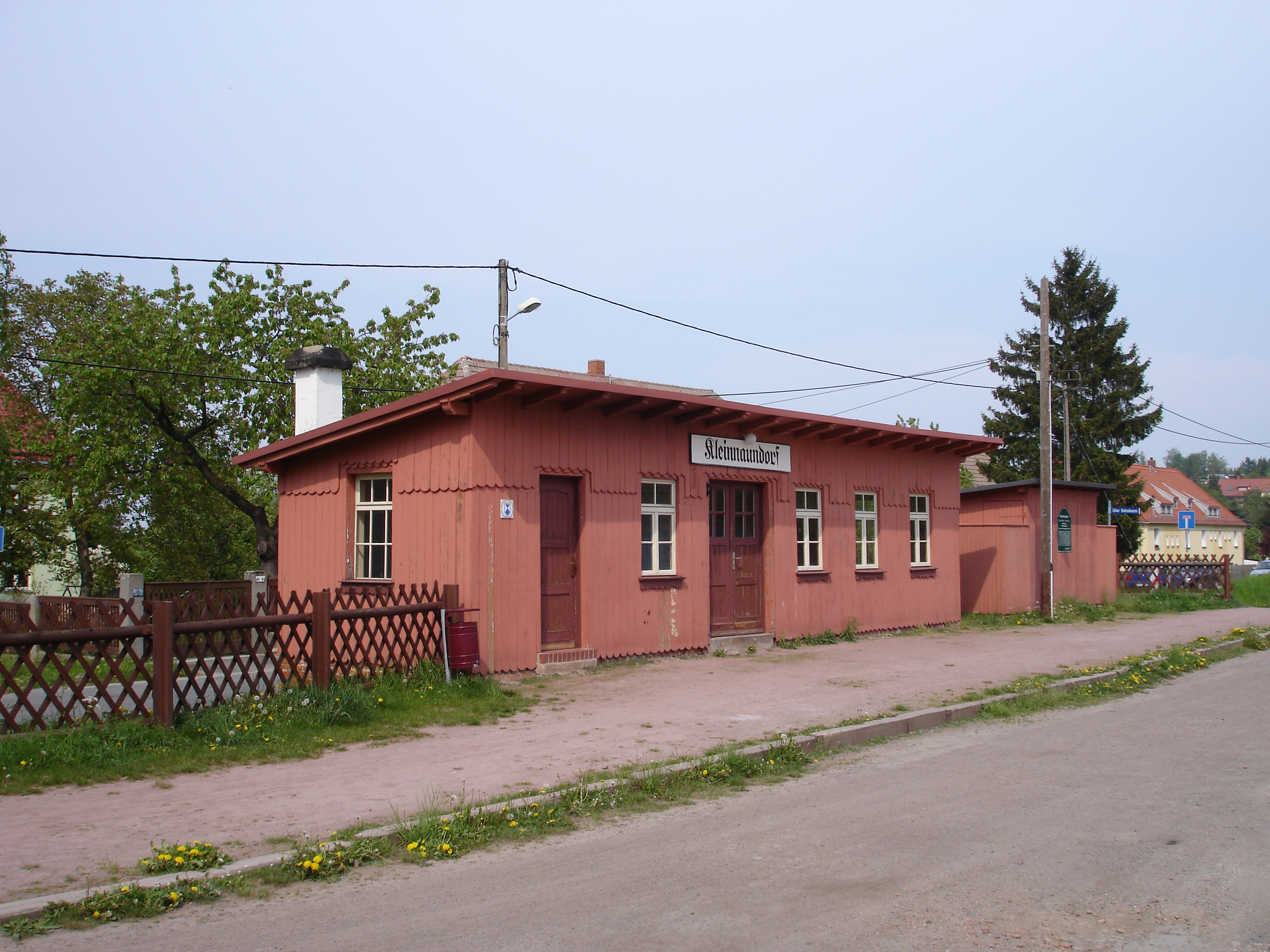
Kleinnaundorf stop (2009)

The Kleinnaundorf stop, on the disused section, connected to the Glück-Auf-Schacht mine and served passengers. Tracks were dismantled around 1972.

The station grounds are now a garage complex. Windbergbahn e.V. restored the station building in the 1980s. The service and toilet buildings are listed. On October 25, 2012, Windbergbahn e.V. transferred the site to the G-Haus Kleinnaundorf association.

==== Cunnersdorf (near Freital) ====
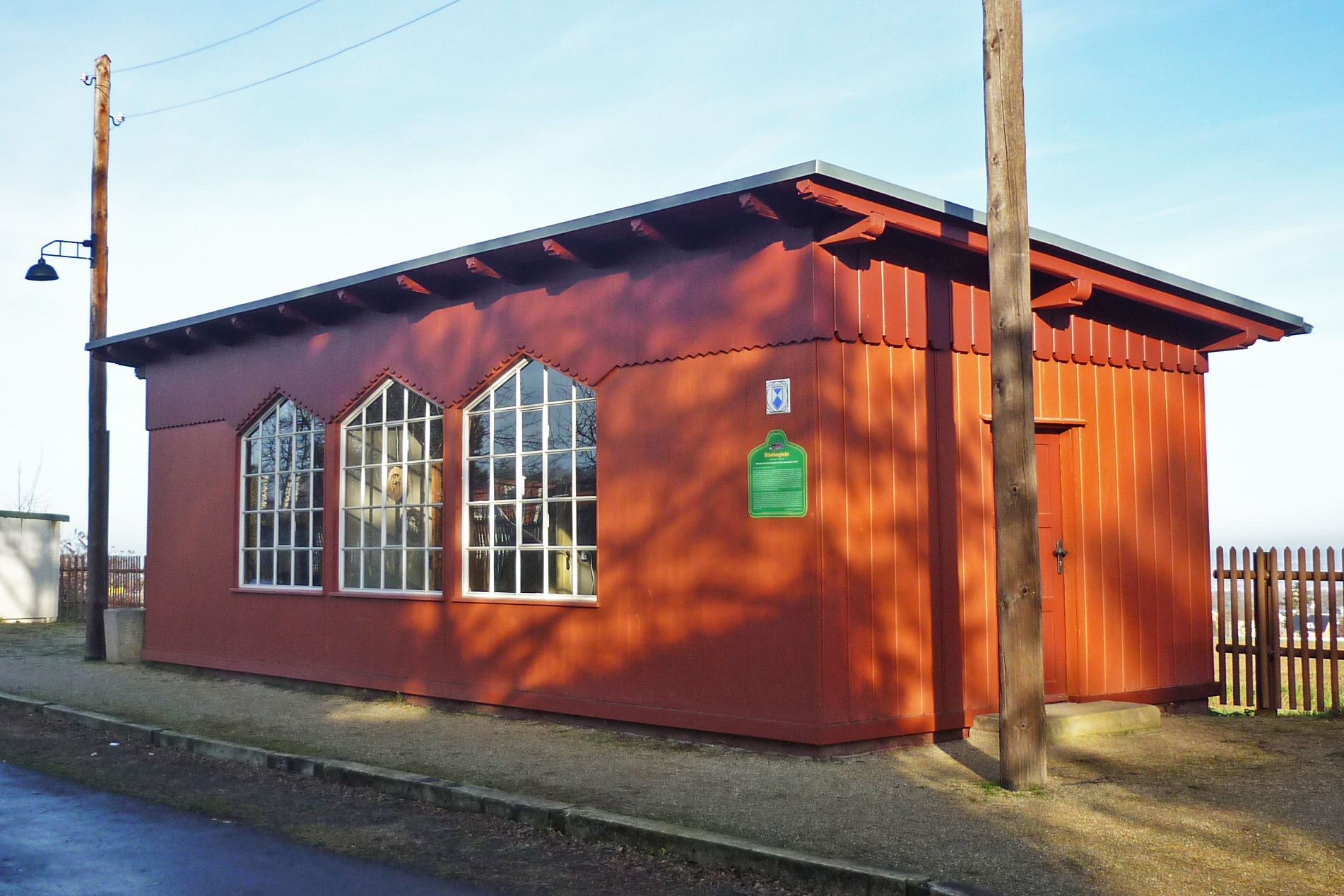
Boderitz/Cunnersdorf stop (2014)

Petitions from Neubannewitz, Boderitz, and Cunnersdorf led to the Cunnersdorf (near Freital) halt (formerly Boderitz-Cunnersdorf) in 1908. It served Marienschacht mine commuters and Sunday excursionists to the Zur Prinzenhöhe dance hall. The wooden station building relocated from Dresden-Plauen in 1923, was restored in 2010 with sponsor funding.

==== Bannewitz ====
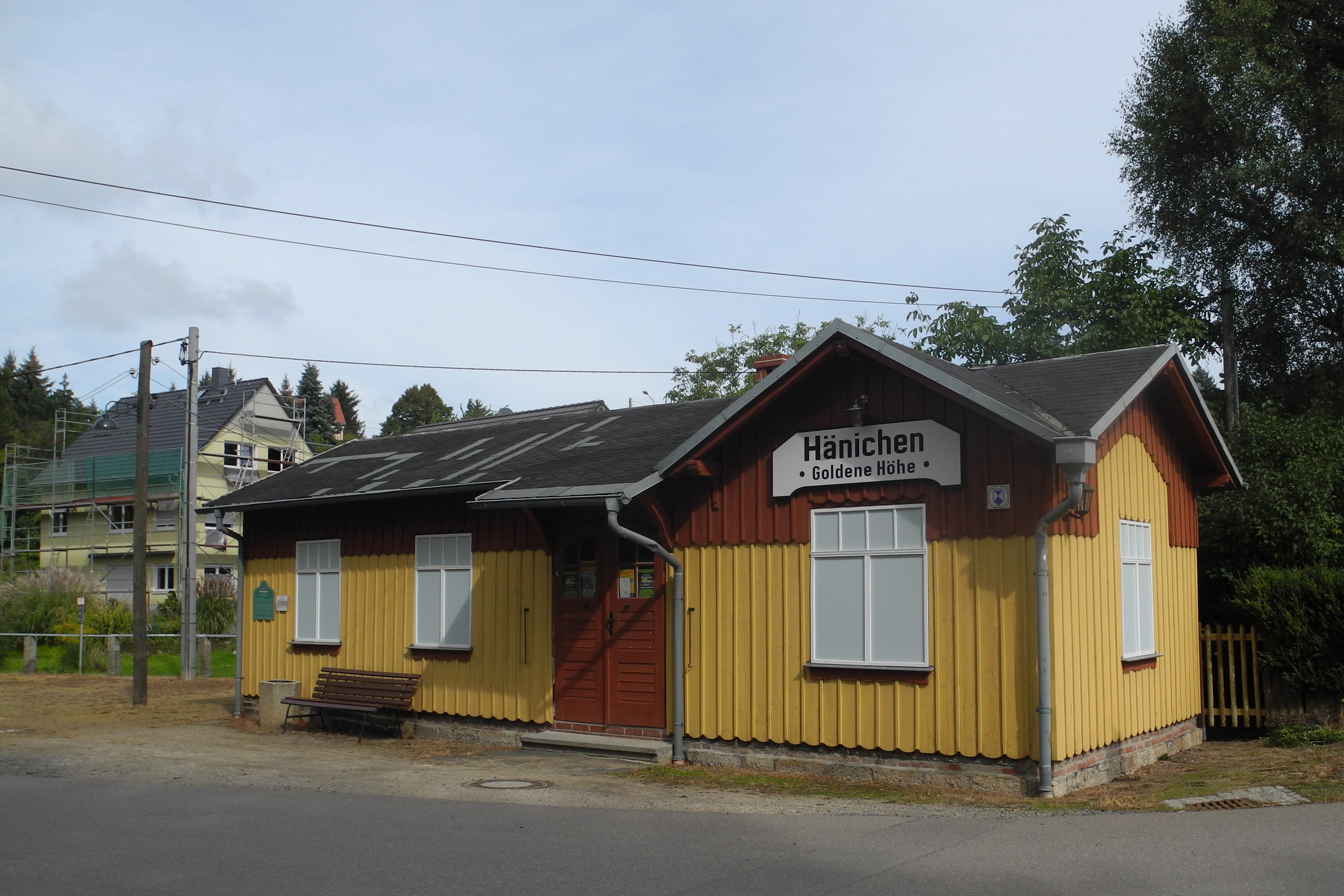
Hänichen-Goldene Höhe station (2017)

Before World War II, Bannewitz station was the Windbergbahn's hub. After the 1951 closure, VEB Kompressorenbau Bannewitz demolished all buildings, including the listed goods shed in 1993.

==== Possendorf ====
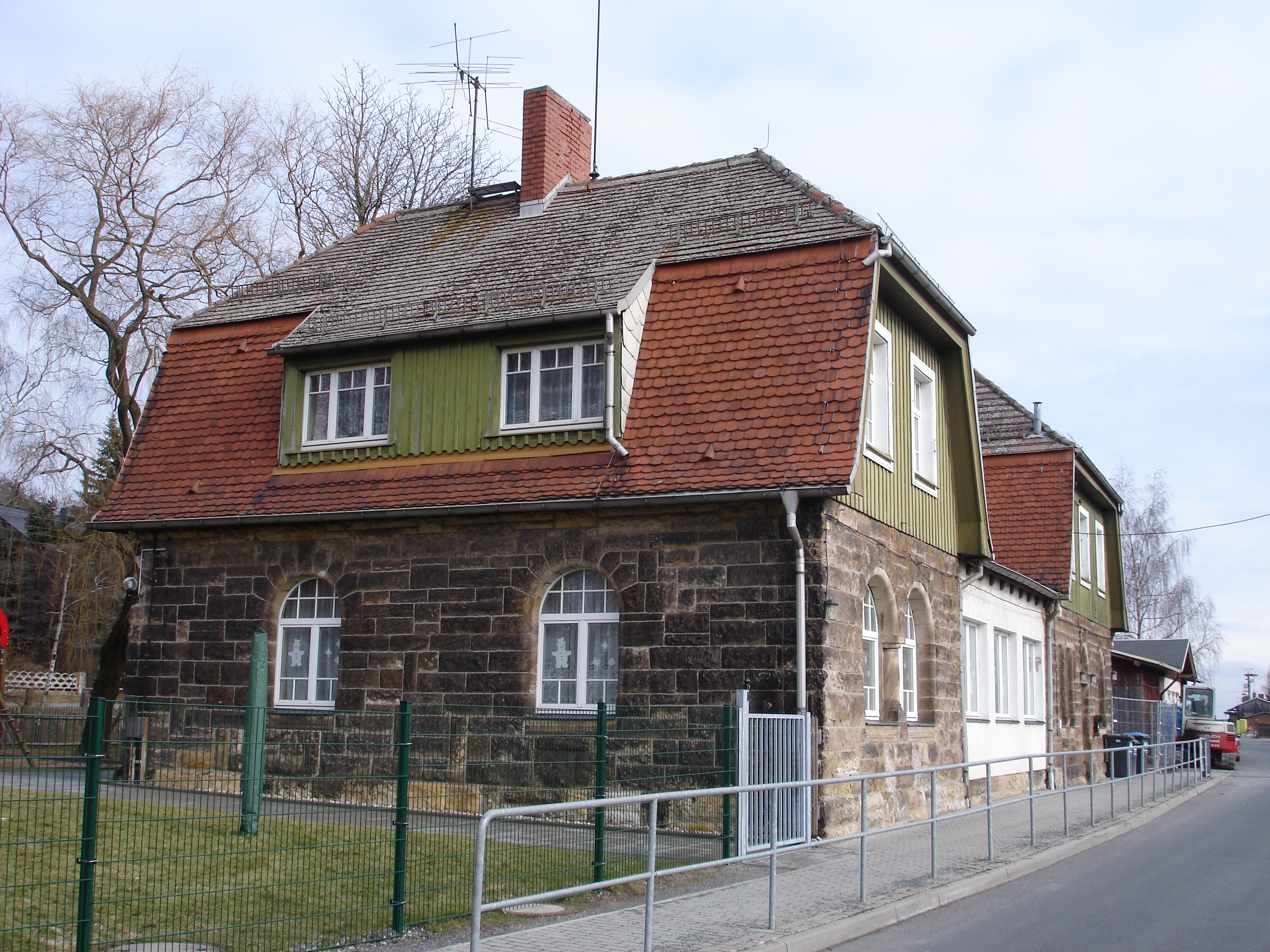
Possendorf station (2009)

Possendorf station, built in 1908 for the extension, handled excursion and freight traffic, including agricultural products, coal, fertilizers, and building materials.

After closure, the reception building became a daycare centre. An agrochemical centre uses the freight facilities. Only the reception building remains; the locomotive shed was demolished in 1972. Since December 2010, a passenger carriage on a track section advertises the Windbergbahn monument.

=== Branch lines and connecting tracks ===
==== Plauenscher Grund wheat mill ====
The connecting railway to the Plauenscher Grund wheat mill branched from Freital Ost station. Used until the early 1990s, it was dismantled after the 2002 Dresden–Werdau line floods.

==== Coschütz power station ====
Built in 1899 on a former watermill site between Coschütz and Birkigt, the Coschütz power station supplied electricity to Coschütz, the Dresden suburb of Naußlitz, and villages including Birkigt, Boderitz, Cunnersdorf, Dölzschen, Gittersee, Großburgk, Kleinburgk, Kleinnaundorf, and Zschiedge, plus manors in Burgk and Cunnersdorf. Operations ceased in 1937.

==== Glückauf shaft ====
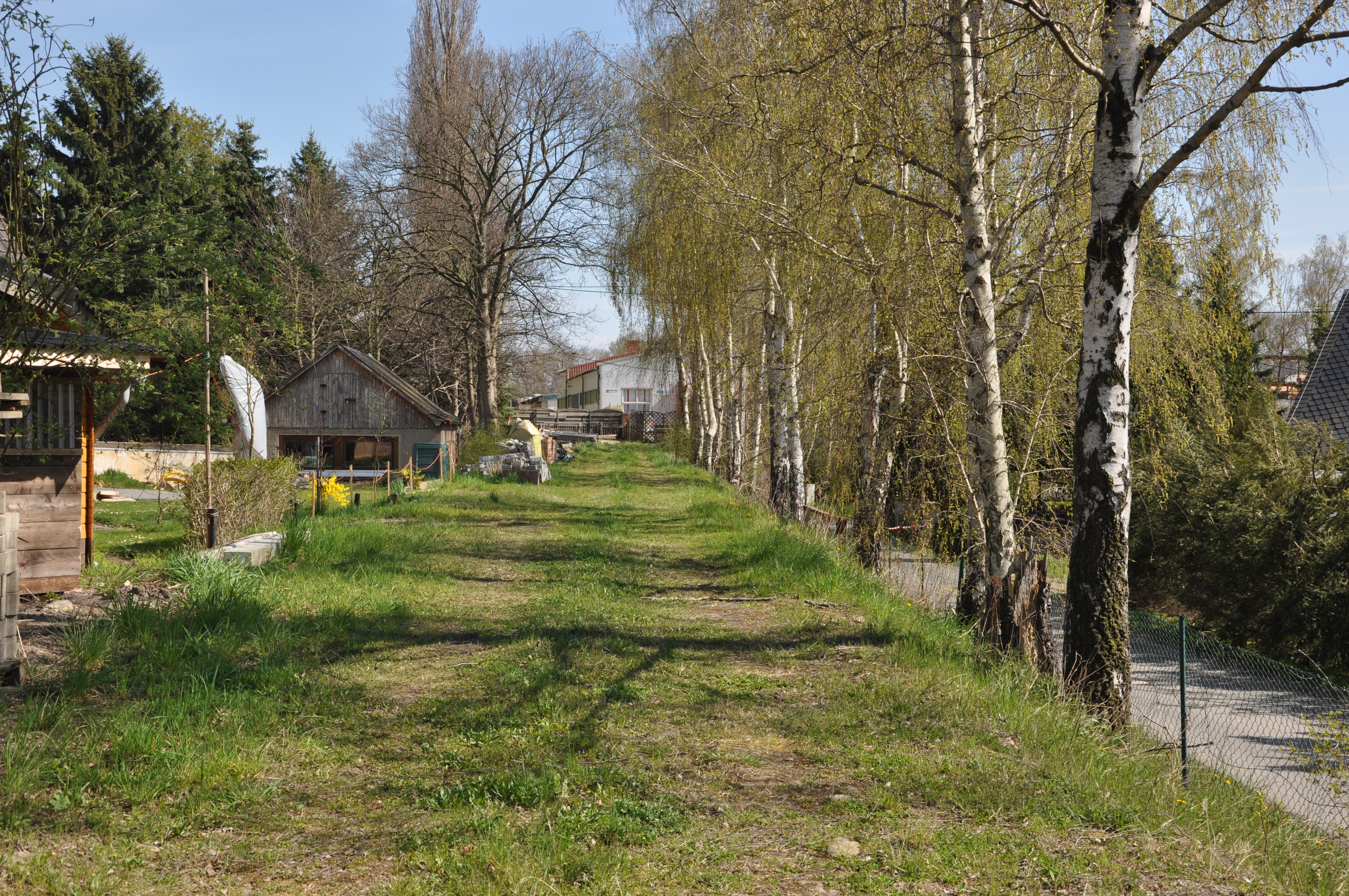
Glückauf shaft branch line track (2015)

The Glückauf shaft, sunk in 1867, had a connecting railway, funded by the Freiherrlich von Burgker Steinkohlen- und Eisenhüttenwerke, operational from 1875. Starting at Kleinnaundorf stop, it climbed to the shaft site. It served coal shipping until the mine closed in 1930. The line then supplied fine coal from the Königin-Carola-Schacht to a briquette factory. On July 27, 1942, the Burgker Werke transferred the site to Dresdner Mineralölproduktengesellschaft 'Kontak' GmbH. Post-World War II, VEB Tankholzwerk and seven affiliates used the track until the Deutsche Reichsbahn terminated the contract on August 19, 1967, and dismantled it.

== Vehicle deployment ==
Due to the 85-meter Geiersgraben curve, Windbergbahn vehicles face restrictions. Rigid-axle vehicles (locomotives or carriages) are limited to a 3.00-meter axle base, while steering axle vehicles can have a 4.50-meter axle base. Bogie wagons were permitted up to an 8.00-meter bogie pivot distance and a 2.60-meter overhang to buffer level.

=== Locomotives and railcars ===
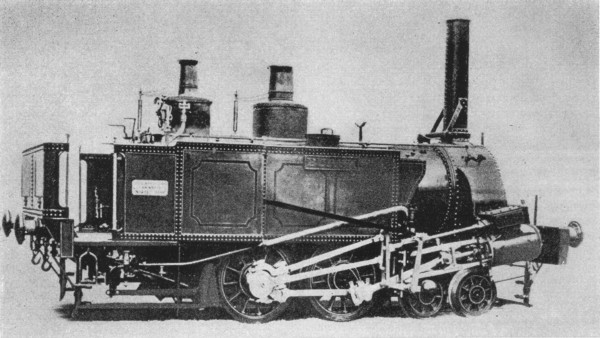
The BURGK (factory photo, 1866)

From 1856, Albertsbahn AG procured five locomotives from Hartmann in Chemnitz for the Hänichener Kohlezweigbahn: ELBE, WINDBERG, STEIGER, FREIBERG, and BURGK. Their leading bogie design is suited to tight radii. After nationalization, the Royal Saxon State Railways classified them as H VIIIb T, retiring them between 1885 and 1893.

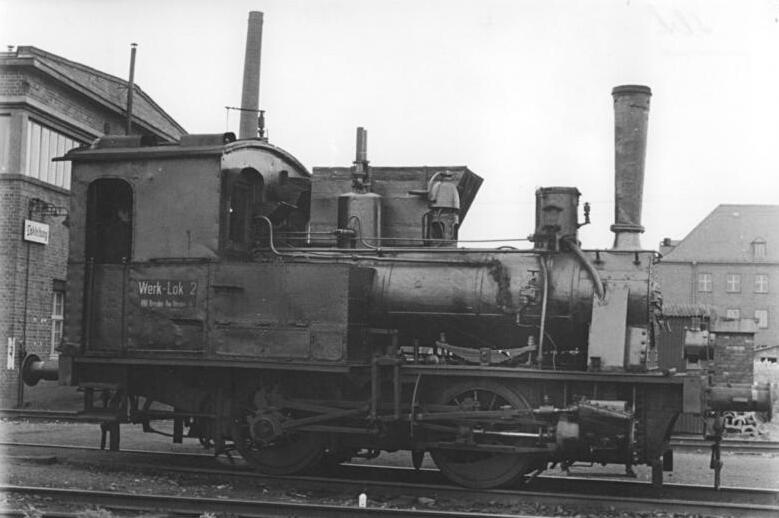
The former VII T HEGEL as a works locomotive in Dresden-Friedrichstadt depot (1952)

Class VII T double-coupled tank locomotives replaced Albertsbahn's locomotives, handling all traffic until World War I. Nineteen locomotives were used, including the HEGEL (built 1886, Sächsische Maschinenfabrik), preserved non-operationally at the Dresden Transport Museum. Around 1900, the sä. M I TV was tested but not used regularly.

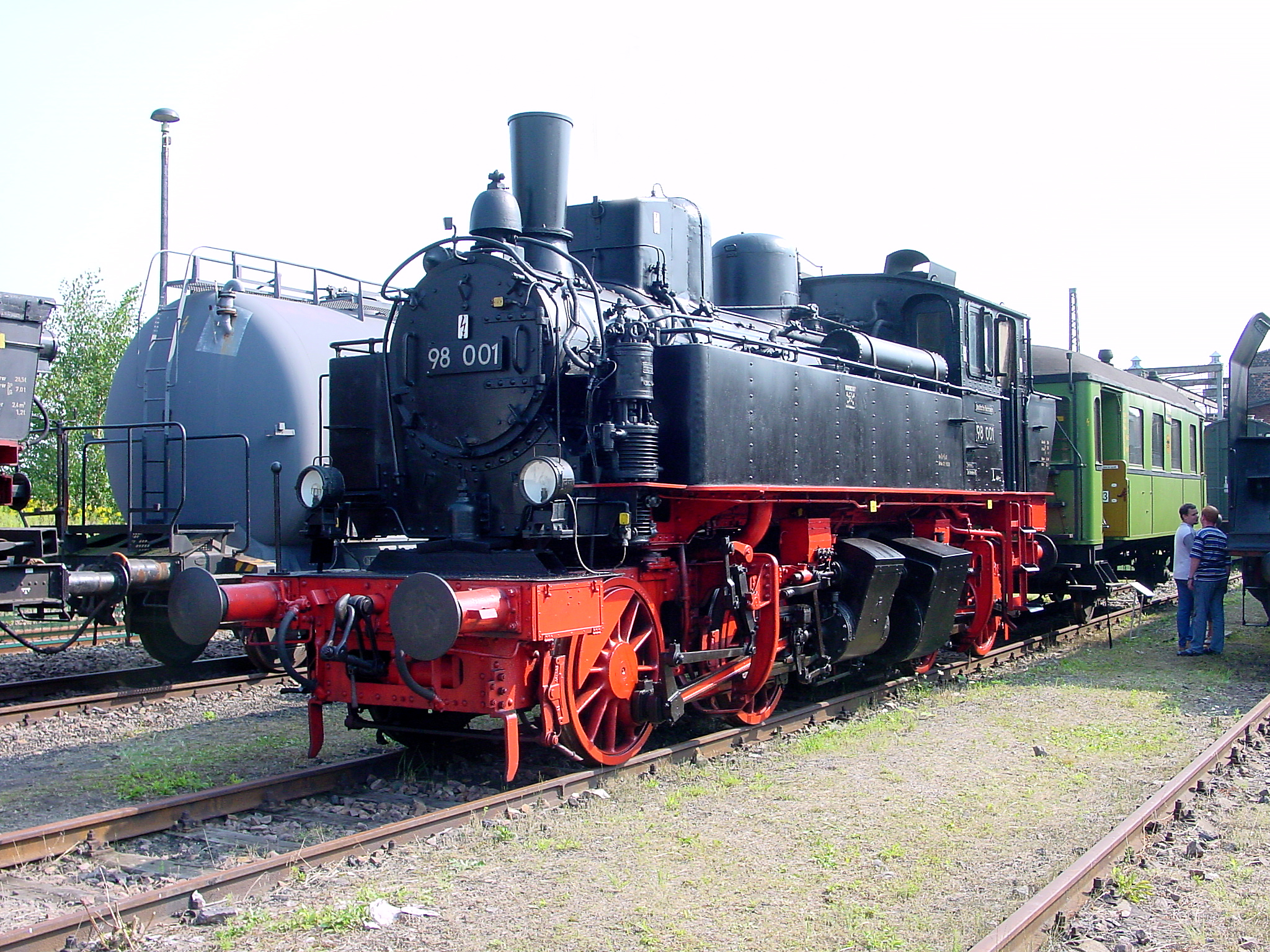
Museum locomotive 98 001 (Saxon class I TV) at the Saxon Railway Museum, Chemnitz (2001)

From 1910 to 1914, class I TV locomotives, designed for the Windbergbahn as Meyer-type bogie locomotives, were introduced and modelled on the narrow-gauge IV K class. The Deutsche Reichsbahn classified them as 98.0 in 1925. They operated until the mid-1960s, replaced by diesel locomotives. The 98 001 (ex I TV 1394) is preserved non-operationally at the Dresden Transport Museum, on loan to the Saxon Industrial Museum in Chemnitz.

From January 4–9, 1934, combustion railcar 766 with a two-axle sidecar (140 001ff) ran on trial.

DR class V 60 diesel locomotives (later 106, now 346) with wheel flange lubrication replaced steam locomotives in the late 1960s, operating until 1993.

=== Trolley ===
==== Goods wagon ====
Brescius's Belgian three-tonne coal wagons inspired Albertsbahn AG's five-tonne wooden wagons, with extended side members as unsprung buffers and hook-and-bracket couplings compatible with state railway wagons. Schrumpf & Thomas (Dresden) built the first 34 wagons, unloadable by hand with removable side walls; Lüders (Görlitz) built 256 with folding floors for heavy unloading.

From the 1900s, state railway goods wagons with suitable curve performance replaced coal hoppers. In the 1960s, the Coschütz tyre factory received external wagons, prompting a 1965 permit for two-axle wagons (4,500–6,500 mm axle base) with special coupling rods. Two coupled wagons were allowed per train. Wagons with buffer discs under 450 mm used temporary buffer discs from 1971 to avoid over-buffering.

==== Passenger coaches ====
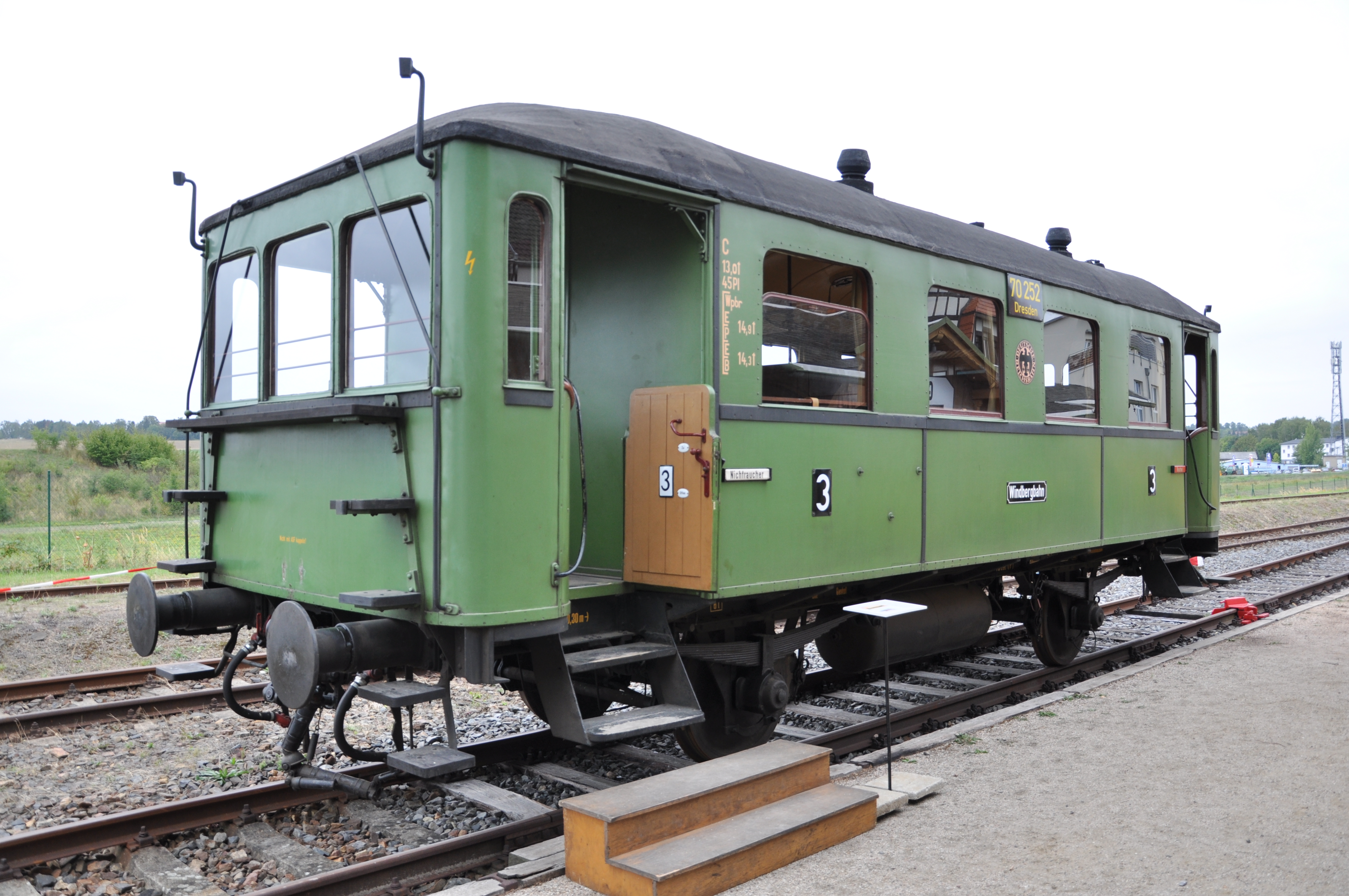
Class C Sa 12 3rd class passenger coach (Windberg observation coach)

Early passenger coaches, with short wheelbases, were used on the Windbergbahn, including 35-year-old compartment carriages with small windows. In 1910, two open-viewing carriages, converted from old compartment carriages, were introduced.

In 1911, the Bautzen wagon and machine factory built four Windberg observation coaches with wide windows and glazed viewing platforms. One is preserved as an operational museum carriage by Windbergbahn e.V.

In the 1930s, the remaining compartment coaches were retired. As modern carriages were too long, five C Sa 95 (sä class 156) compartment carriages were modified in 1936 to a 4,500 mm wheelbase, designated C Sa 95/32. On November 9, 1957, the last passenger train included two conversion wagons, two observation coaches, and a Prussian freight wagon.

== Museum on the history of the Windberg railway ==
The Museum on the History of the Windberg Railway, located in Dresden-Gittersee station's former waiting hall, is one of Dresden's four rail transport museums, alongside the Railway Museum Bw Dresden-Altstadt, Dresden Transport Museum, and Dresden Tram Museum.

The exhibition features display boards with photos and drawings, historical artefacts, and a souvenir shop with railway literature. The 1920 goods shed houses a mechanical Jüdel signal box, operational since 1957, the line's only one.

Windbergbahn e.V.'s railway vehicles are displayed on Dresden-Gittersee station tracks.

== The existing route ==
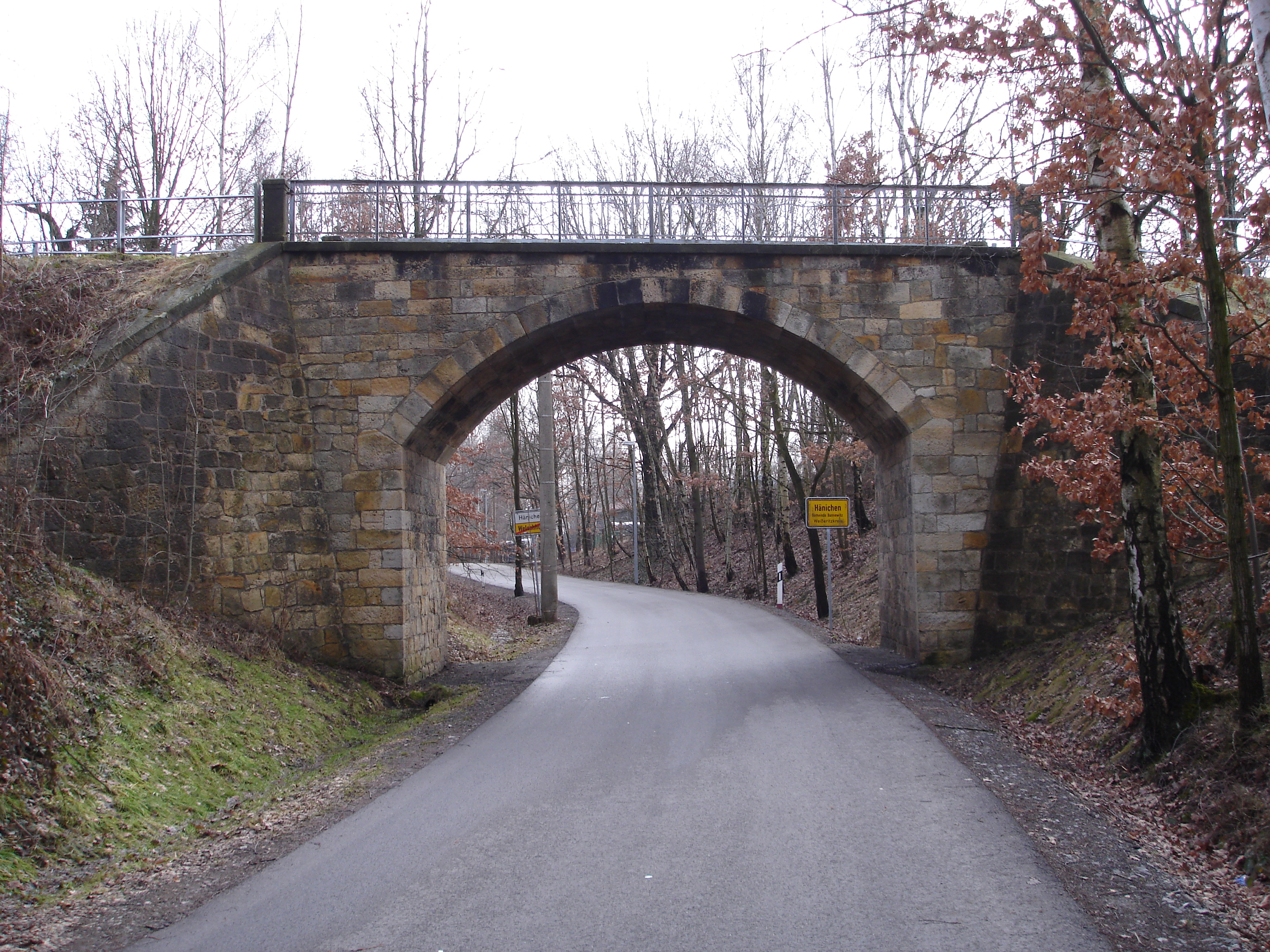
Windbergbahn route used as a road in Hänichen

Except for the dismantled Freital Ost branch, the line to Dresden-Gittersee remains passable. After track repairs, regular train services could resume.

The line from Kleinnaundorf to Possendorf was dismantled in 1951 and 1972. A 1980 preservation order keeps the route largely unobstructed, except for sections at Kleinnaundorf stop to Schulberg, northern Bannewitz station to Horkenstraße, Bahnhofstraße/Pulverweg in Hänichen, and Possendorf station. Since the 1990s, a cycle path, named Guido-Brescius-Weg in 2019 for Kleinnaundorf's 875th anniversary, follows the track.

== Bibliography ==
- Sandig, Hans-Ullrich (1978). "Die Windbergbahn – Zu ihrem 120jährigen Bestehen" [The Windberg Railway – On its 120th anniversary.]. Sächsische Heimatblätter (in German). 24 (4): 145–153..
- Scheffler, Rainer (1981). "Über die "Kreuzspinnen" der Windbergbahn" [On the 'cross spiders' of the Windberg Railway.]. Modelleisenbahner (in German). 30 (3): 75–76..
- Schubert, Jürgen (1982). Die Windbergbahn [The Windberg Railway.] (in German). Berlin; Düsseldorf: Transpress VEB Publishing House for Transport; Alba-Verlag. ISBN 3-87094-202-9..
- Schubert, Jürgen (1993). Die Windbergbahn [The Windbergbahn] (in German). Nordhorn: Kenning Publishing House. ISBN 3-927587-18-4..
