= Birkigt =

Birkigt may refer to:

- Birkigt (Freital), a district of Freital, Germany
- Marc Birkigt, a Swiss engineer
