= Saxon M I TV =

Class of 2 German 0-4-4-0T Meyer locomotives

M I TV
Type and origin
- Builder: Sächsische Maschinenfabrik, Chemnitz
- Build date: 1890/1891
- Total produced: 2
Specifications
- Gauge: 1,435 mm (4 ft 8 1/2 in)
- Driver dia.: 1,120 mm (3 ft 8 in)
- Length
  - Over beams: 9,934 mm (32 ft 7 in)
- Axle load: 12.8 tonnes (12.6 long tons; 14.1 short tons)
- Adhesive weight: 51.1 tonnes (50.3 long tons; 56.3 short tons)
- Empty weight: 43.8 tonnes (43.1 long tons; 48.3 short tons)
- Service weight: 54.4 tonnes (53.5 long tons; 60.0 short tons)
- Fuel capacity: 1.7 tonnes (1.7 long tons; 1.9 short tons)
- Water cap.: 5.15 m^{3} (1,130 imp gal)
- Boiler
- No. of heating tubes: 174
- Heating tube length: 3,700 mm (12 ft 1 3/4 in)
- Boiler pressure: 12 kg/cm^{2} (1,180 kPa; 171 psi)
- Heating surface
  - Firebox: 1.4 m^{2} (15 sq ft)
  - Radiative: 5.5 m^{2} (59 sq ft)
  - Tubes: 80.9 m^{2} (871 sq ft)
  - Evaporative: 86.4 m^{2} (930 sq ft)
- Cylinders: 4
- High-pressure cylinder: 300 millimetres (11 13/16 in)
- Low-pressure cylinder: 460 millimetres (18 1/8 in)
- Piston stroke: 533 millimetres (21 in)
- Valve gear: Walschaerts (Heusinger)
- Loco brake: Steam brake; counterweight brake
Performance figures
- Maximum speed: 45 km/h (28 mph)
- Tractive effort
  - Starting: 50 kN (11,000 lbf)
Career
- Numbers: 822/823 from 1892: 1399/1400
- Retired: 1922

The Saxon class M I TV was a class of two German 0-4-4-0 Meyer tank locomotives built for the Royal Saxon State Railways (German: Königlich Sächsischen Staatseisenbahnen, K.Sä.St.E.)

== History ==
In 1890, the Sächsische Maschinenfabrik in Chemnitz developed a Günther-Meyer articulated locomotive for operation on the winding branch lines of the Ore Mountains. However, only two locomotives with the serial numbers 1658 and 1659 were built. The two locomotives were given the fleet numbers 822 and 823 and the names RASCHAU and CROTTENDORF.

Initially, they were classified as H M I TV. From 1896 they were then called M I TV; from 1900 they were referred to as I TV.

The locomotives did not prove themselves, so initially no further locomotives of this type were procured. The locomotives tended to run unevenly, especially at higher speeds. In addition, there was an increased tendency to slip when starting. Similar locomotives were procured for the Saxon narrow-gauge railways as class IV K from 1892.

It was only after the turn of the century that powerful and particularly curvy locomotives were needed for the Windbergbahn near Dresden that locomotives of the same type were built. However, these differed significantly from the original design (see Saxon I TV).

The two M I TV locomotives were withdrawn from service in 1922, and the Deutsche Reichsbahn gave them no new numbers.

== Technical features ==
The locomotives had a two-ring boiler with a Crampton firebox. Two non-lifting Friedmann injectors were used to feed the boiler

The steam circuit was designed as a four-cylinder compound drive with Walschaerts valve gear (Heusinger) and flat slide valves. The smaller high-pressure cylinders were on the rear bogie, the larger low-pressure cylinders on the front bogie. The bogies were connected by a coupling iron in order to reduce any counter-rotating movements.

The water supply was housed in side tanks. The coal was located in a bunker behind the driver's cab.

The locomotives originally only had a steam brake as braking equipment, supplemented by a counterweight brake. Westinghouse air brakes were later retrofitted.

As special equipment, they were provided with a Latowski-type of steam-driven bell.
