= Saxon I TV =

I TV DR Class 98.0
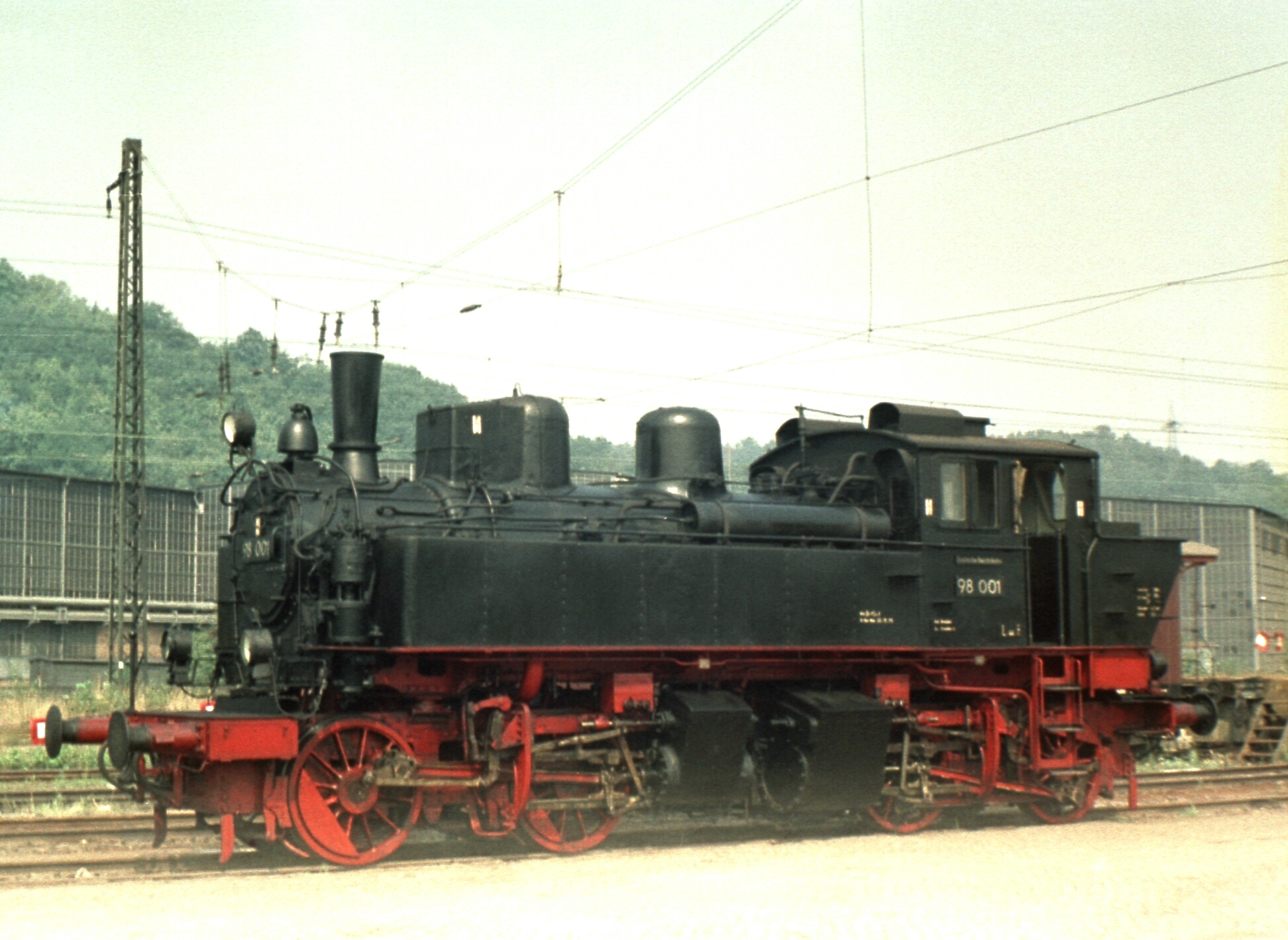
- 98 001 in Freital-Hainsberg, 27 August 1983
Type and origin
- Builder: Sächsische Maschinenfabrik, Chemnitz
- Build date: 1910–1914
- Total produced: 19
Specifications
- Configuration
  - Whyte: 0-4-4-0T
  - UIC: B′B′ n4vt
- Gauge: 1,435 mm (4 ft 8 1/2 in)
- Driver dia.: 1,260 mm (4 ft 1 5/8 in)
- Length
  - Over beams: 11,624 mm (38 ft 1 3/4 in)
- Axle load: 15.4 tonnes (15.2 long tons; 17.0 short tons)
- Adhesive weight: 60.5 tonnes (59.5 long tons; 66.7 short tons)
- Empty weight: 47.8–50.4 tonnes (47.0–49.6 long tons; 52.7–55.6 short tons)
- Service weight: 59.0–62.0 tonnes (58.1–61.0 long tons; 65.0–68.3 short tons)
- Fuel capacity: 2,200 kilograms (4,900 lb)
- Water cap.: 5,000 litres (1,100 imp gal; 1,300 US gal)
- Boiler
- No. of heating tubes: 199
- Heating tube length: 3,700 mm (12 ft 1 3/4 in)
- Boiler pressure: 13 kg/cm^{2} (1,270 kPa; 185 psi)
- Heating surface
  - Firebox: 1.60 m^{2} (17.2 sq ft)
  - Radiative: 6.8 m^{2} (73 sq ft)
  - Tubes: 92.5 m^{2} (996 sq ft)
  - Evaporative: 99.28 m^{2} (1,068.6 sq ft)
- Cylinders: 4
- High-pressure cylinder: 360 mm (14 3/16 in)
- Low-pressure cylinder: 570 mm (22 7/16 in)
- Piston stroke: 630 mm (24 13/16 in)
- Valve gear: Walschaerts (Heusinger)
- Loco brake: Westinghouse
Performance figures
- Maximum speed: 50 km/h (31 mph)
- Indicated power: 540 PS (400 kW; 530 hp)
Career
- Numbers: KSäStE: 1381–1398; DRG: 98 001 – 98 015
- Retired: 1931–1968

The Saxon class I T$\textstyle \mathfrak{V}$ were a class of 19 German 0-4-4-0 Meyer tank locomotives built for the Royal Saxon State Railways (German: Königlich Sächsischen Staatseisenbahnen, K.Sä.St.E) for service of the Windbergbahn. The Deutsche Reichsbahn assigned them to Class 98.0.

== History ==
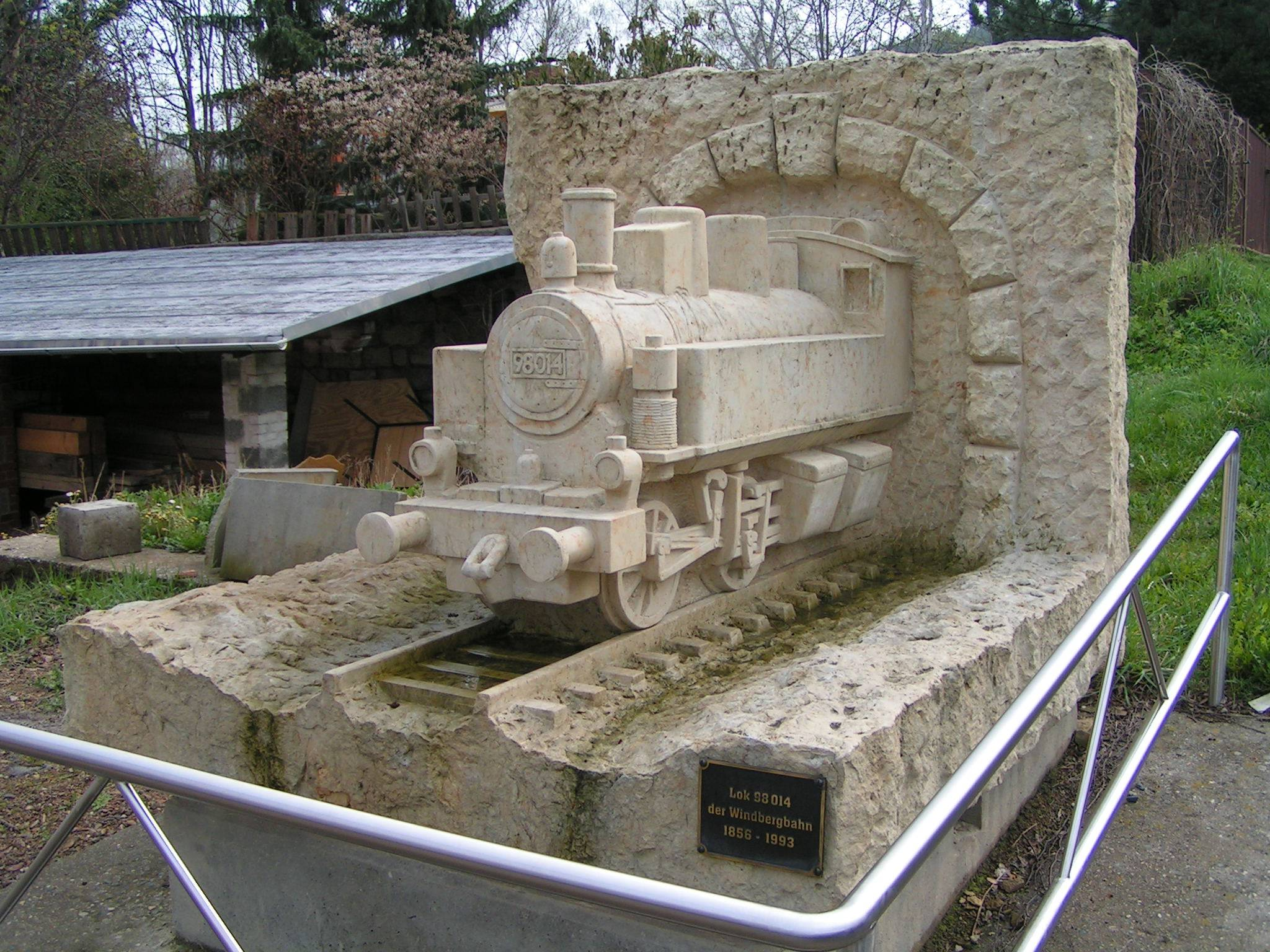
Monument for the Windbergbahn in the form of locomotive 98 014 carved out of sandstone near the Burgk Castle in Freital

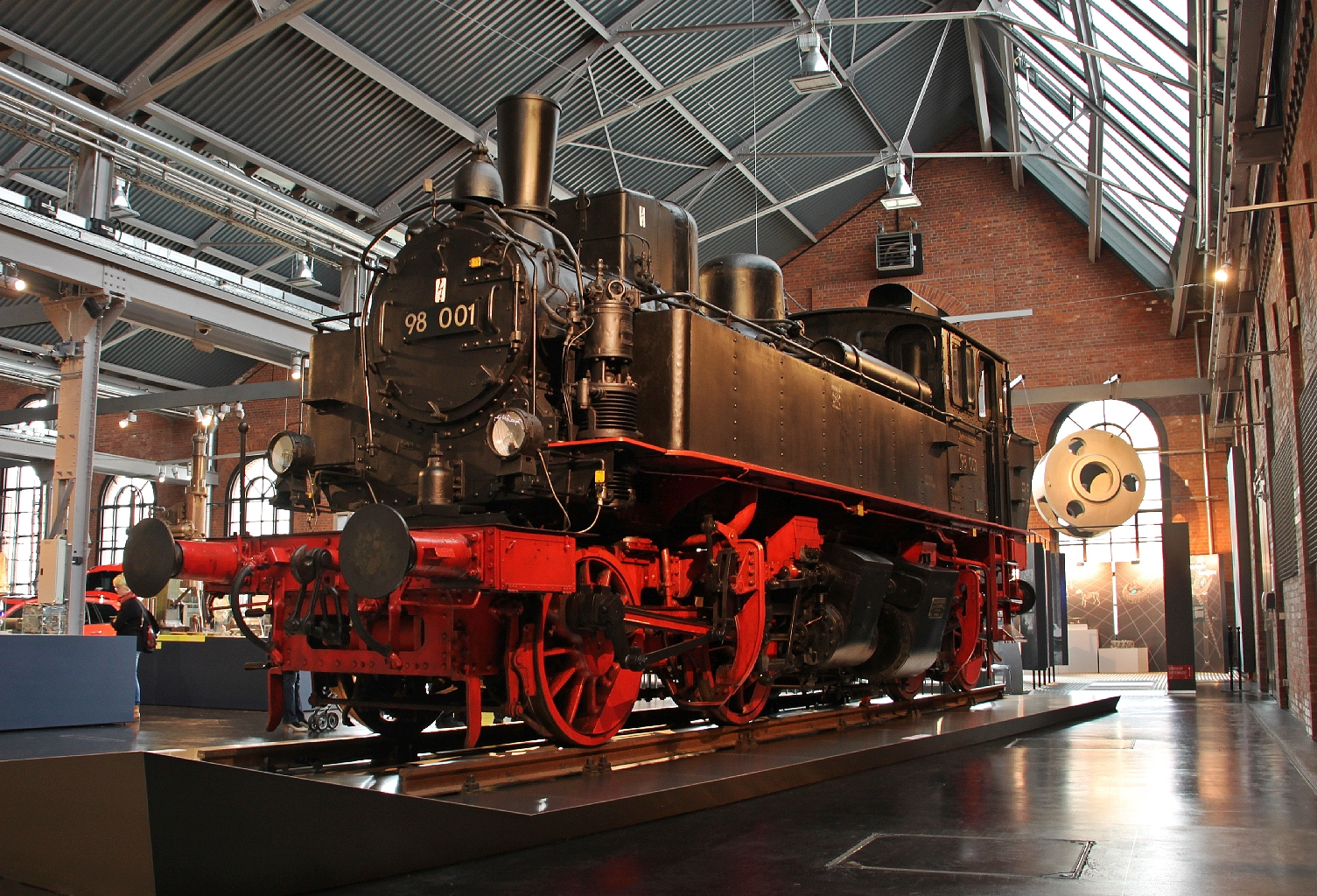
Locomotive 98 001 (ex I TV 1394) in the Industrial Museum Chemnitz

Near Dresden, the Royal Saxon State Railways had the Windbergbahn, a branch line primarily serving coal traffic, which, in addition to a steep incline, also had a minimum curve of only 85 metres (278 ft 10 in) in radius. At the turn of the century, the performance of the previously used locomotives of the VII T class was no longer sufficient. The reasons for this were the onset of excursion traffic as well as increasing transport volumes in coal transport. Between 1910 and 1914, the Sächsische Maschinenfabrik delivered a total of 19 locomotives in 3 lots, which were largely similar in their design to the tried and tested narrow-gauge locomotives of the IV K class. The construction lots differed in terms of their service weights and external design. They were popularly known as "Windberglok" or "Cross spider" (German: Kreuzspinne).

Three locomotives were lost in World War I; the Deutsche Reichsbahn took over the remaining 15 locomotives in 1920 and gave them the numbers 98 001 to 98 015. Like all locomotives of the 98 series, the machines were thus classified as local railway (German: Lokalbahn) locomotives.

In 1940 the Reichsbahn took over another locomotive of this type that had been delivered to the Oberhohndorf-Reinsdorf Coal Railway and gave it the road number 98 015 (second); the first 98 015 having been retired.

All the remaining locomotives survived World War II. Two locomotives were badly damaged in the air raid on 13 February 1945, but were rebuilt. They continued to be used on their main line in passenger and freight traffic. Between 1952 and 1962 they were used double-heading uranium ore block trains to Dresden-Gittersee. The trains consisted of 10 wagons with a capacity of 20 tons each. The eight remaining locomotives transported 560,000 tons of uranium ore to Gittersee every year. It was only with the introduction of locomotives of the DR Class V 60 (later series 106, now 346) with wheel flange lubrication that the locomotives could be replaced on the winding route at the end of the 1960s. The last class 98.0 was retired in 1968.

The 98 001 (ex K.SäSt.E. 1394) has been preserved and is part of the holdings of the Dresden Transport Museum. It is currently on loan at the Industrial Museum in Chemnitz.

== Technical features ==
The locomotives had a two-ring boiler with a Crampton firebox. Two non-lifting Friedmann injectors were used to feed the boiler. From 1914, those of the Winzer type were also used.

The steam circuit was designed as a four-cylinder compound drive with Walschaerts valve gear (Heusinger) and flat slide valves. The smaller high-pressure cylinders were on the front, the larger low-pressure cylinders on the rear bogie. The bogies were connected by a coupling iron in order to reduce any counter-rotating movements.

The water supply was housed in side tanks, the coal in a bunker behind the driver's cab.

The locomotives were factory-fitted with a Westinghouse air brake, supplemented by a counterweight brake. As special equipment, they were provided with a Latowski-type of steam-driven bell.
