= Birkigt (Freital) =

District In Freital

Coordinates: 51°00′40″N 13°40′50″E

Birkigt is a district in Freital, a town in Sächsische Schweiz-Osterzgebirge, Saxony, Germany. Formerly an independent municipality, it was absorbed by Freital in 1923.

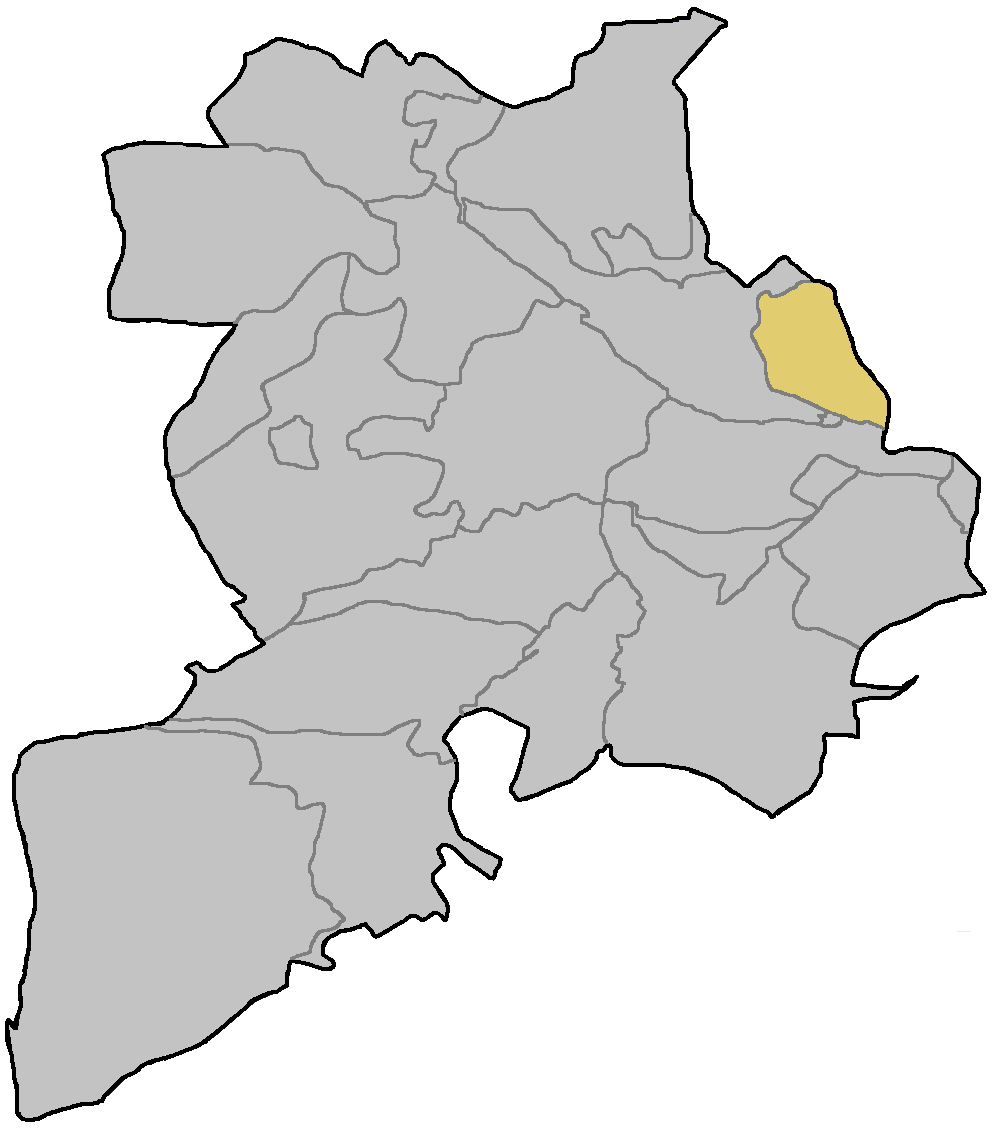
Birkigt (shown in yellow)

== History ==
The district was first mentioned in 1326. On August 24, 1944, the district was badly damaged during a U.S. air raid.

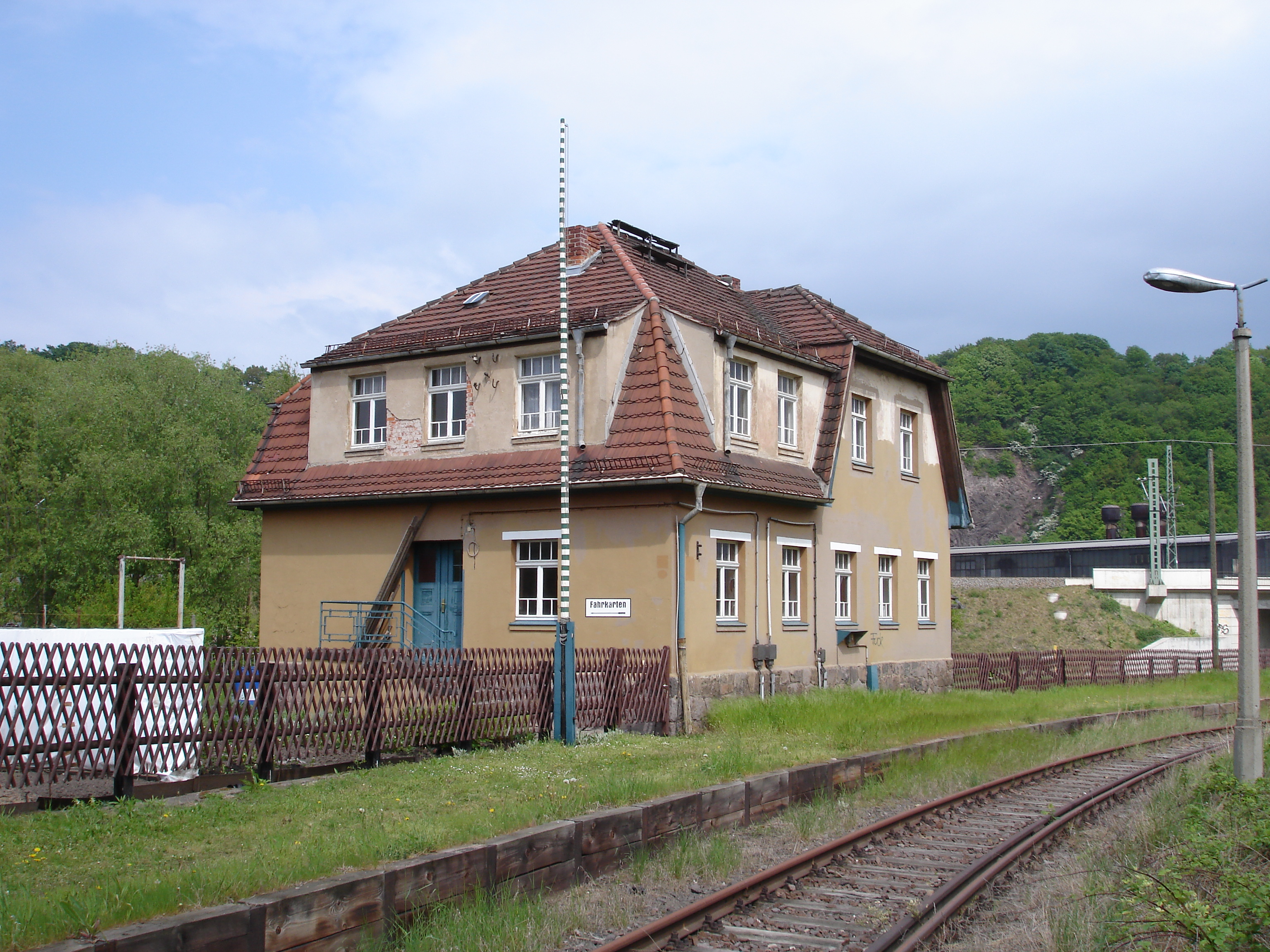
Freital-Birkigt train station

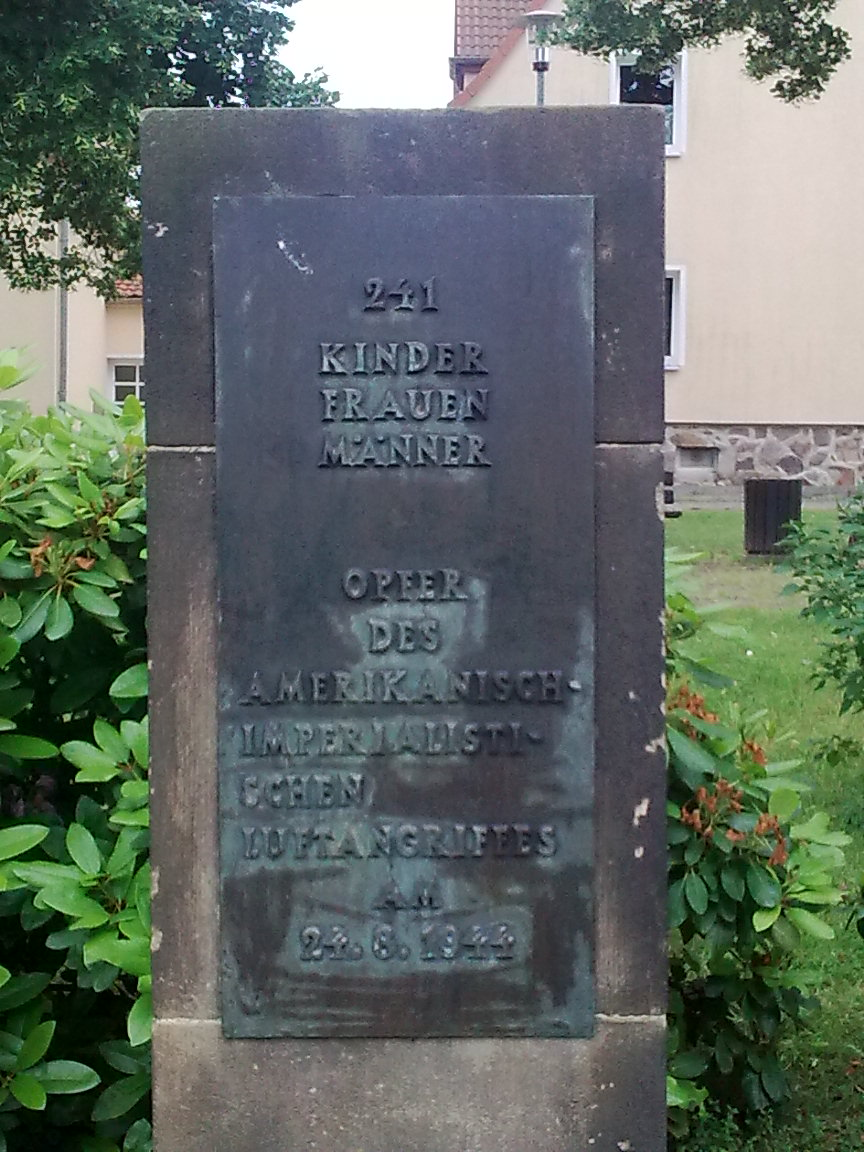
A memorial to the victims of the U.S. air raid
