= Meyer locomotive =

Type of articulated locomotive

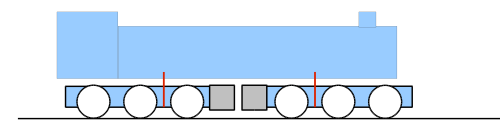
Diagram of Meyer articulation system

A Meyer locomotive is a type of articulated locomotive that has two separate bogies, upon which the boiler and firebox swivel. The design was never as popular as the Garratt or Mallet locomotives. It can be best regarded as 19th century competition for the early compound Mallet and also the Fairlie articulated designs. Most single cab modern trains are of a similar design such as power cars, freight diesel locomotives, and some passenger locomotives.

== Development and design ==
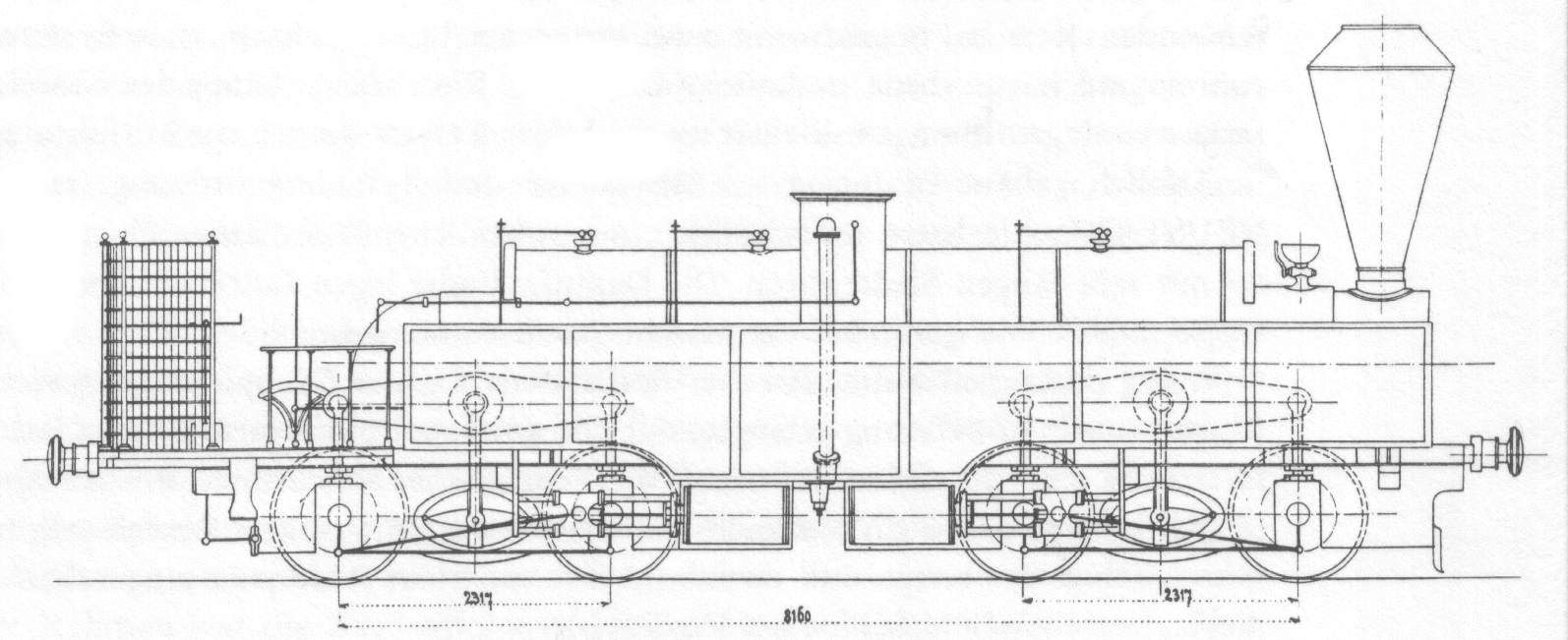
The first Meyer locomotive (Neustadt, 1851) preceded Meyer's design by a decade

The Meyer was in fact invented by Austrian engineer Wenzel Günther of the Wiener Neustädter Lokomotivfabrik for the Semmering Trials of 1851. However, the technology wasn't yet developed for the steam to be reliably transported to the bogies with reasonable amount of leaks, and despite generally good performance of the design on the trials the company abandoned the idea.

It was reinvigorated by Frenchman Jean-Jacques Meyer (1804-1877), who took out a patent on the design in 1861. The first locomotive, an 0-4-4-0 named the Future (French: L'Avenir), was built by Société J. F. Cail et Cie. in 1868 with the support of a state subsidy.

No wheels are rigidly affixed to the boiler; all are mounted on bogies placed directly under the boiler/cab unit (comparable with a modern diesel or electric locomotive). This compares with a Mallet, where the rear set of wheels are attached to the frame, and only the front set swivels as a bogie. Therefore, boiler overhang is less than that of the Mallet locomotive on a curve of the same radius. Meyers are usually set up as a tank engine, with the boiler/cab unit carrying the water and fuel supplies.

A disadvantage of the design is that the firebox is directly above the rear power unit, which limits its size. With two power bogies, flexible steam pipes must be provided to all cylinders. This was difficult to achieve with 19th century technology. Early Mallet locomotives had compound cylinders, so high pressure steam was provided to the rigid power unit, while the front cylinders (requiring flexible steam pipes) received low pressure steam.

Meyer locomotives were most common in continental Europe, particularly Germany. A number of Meyer locos can still be found on the narrow gauge railways in Saxony. The most common locomotive is the Saxon IV K.

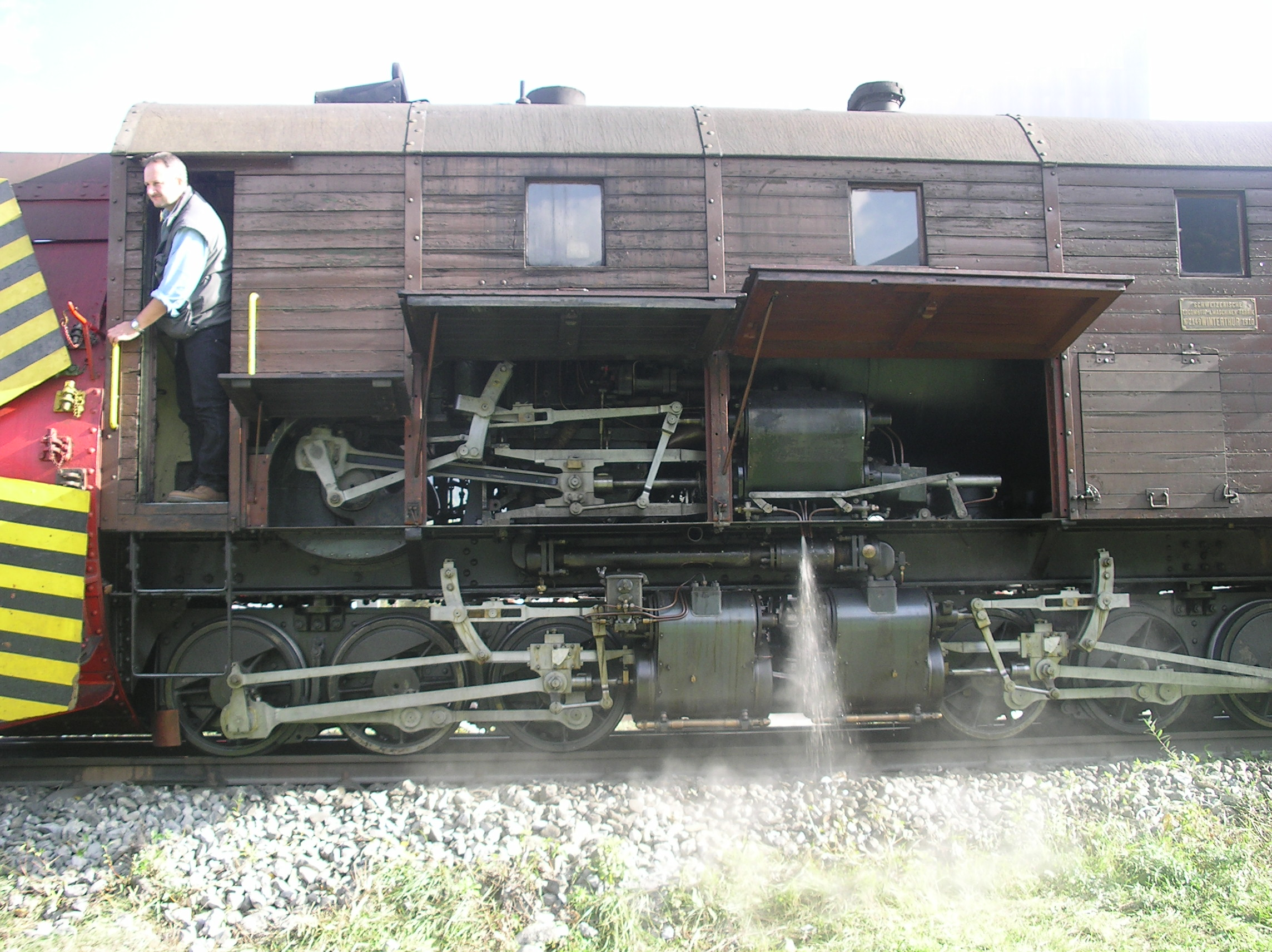
The twin Meyer bogies with the (operating) drive of the rotary snow plough above

The Switzerland Bernina Railway had two rotary snowplows built by Schweizerische Lokomotiv- und Maschinenfabrik in 1910 and 1912. To work on the tight curves of the 1,000 mm (3 ft 3 3/8 in) meter gauge mountain railway they had to be selfpropelled, the two snow blowers were thus built with a Meyer drive system. Both have been preserved, X^{rot d} 9213 is still in working condition on the Rhaetian Railway, based in Pontresina, as of 2010.

== Kitson Meyer ==
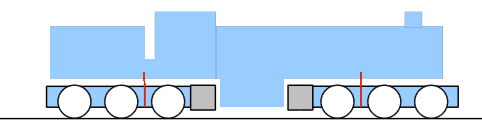
Kitson-Meyer articulated steam locomotive.

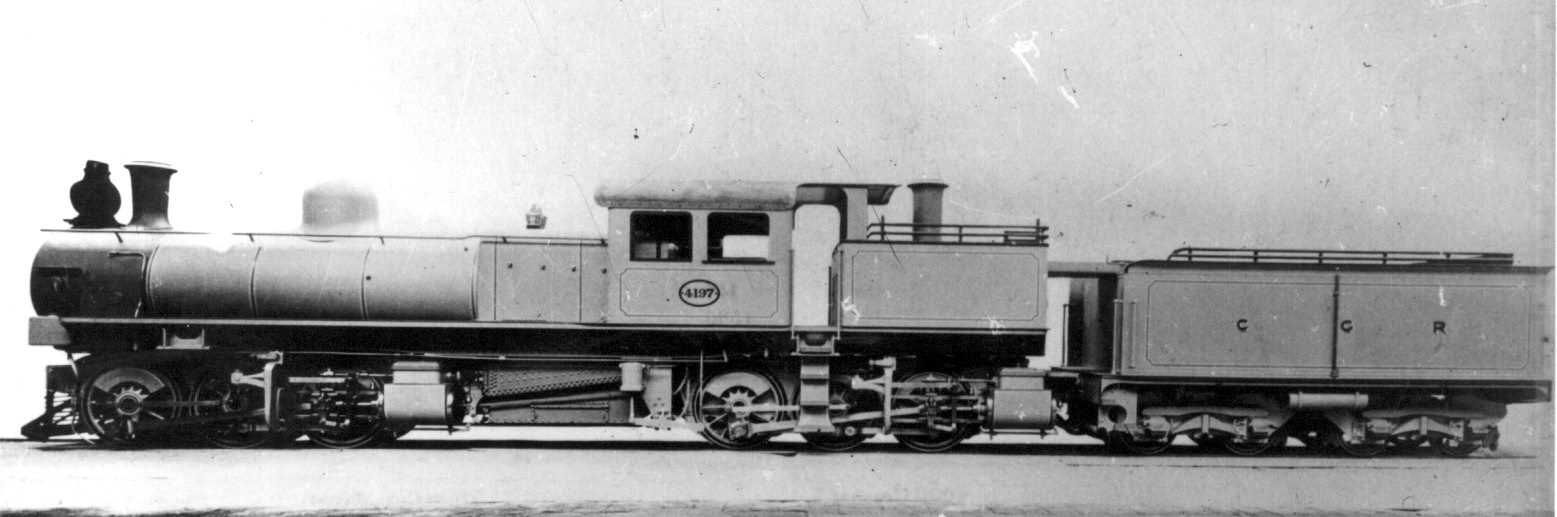
SAR class KM (1904).

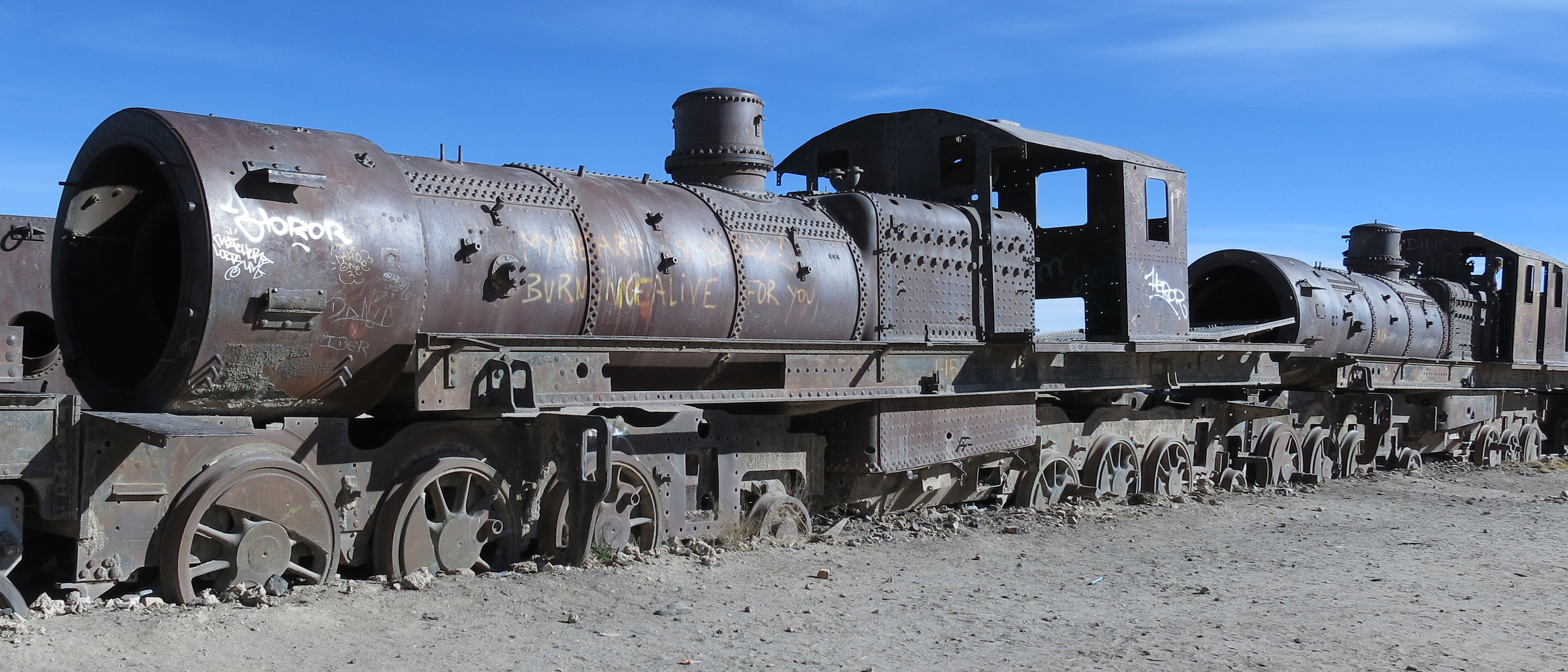
The derelict remains of two Kitson-Meyer locomotives in the "Locomotive Graveyard", Uyuni, Bolivia.

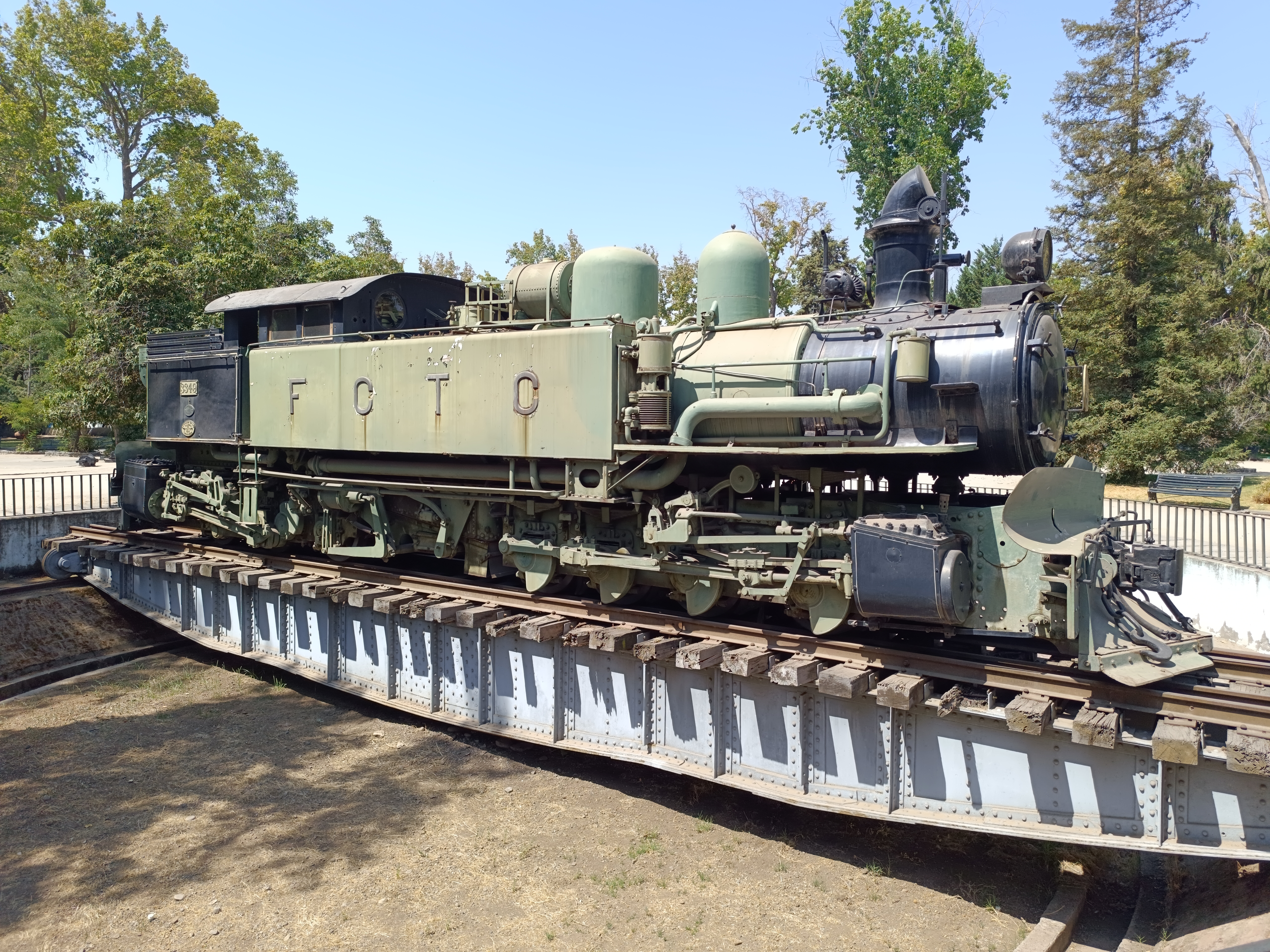
Kitson-Meyer 3349, year 1909, preserved in the Santiago Railway Museum.

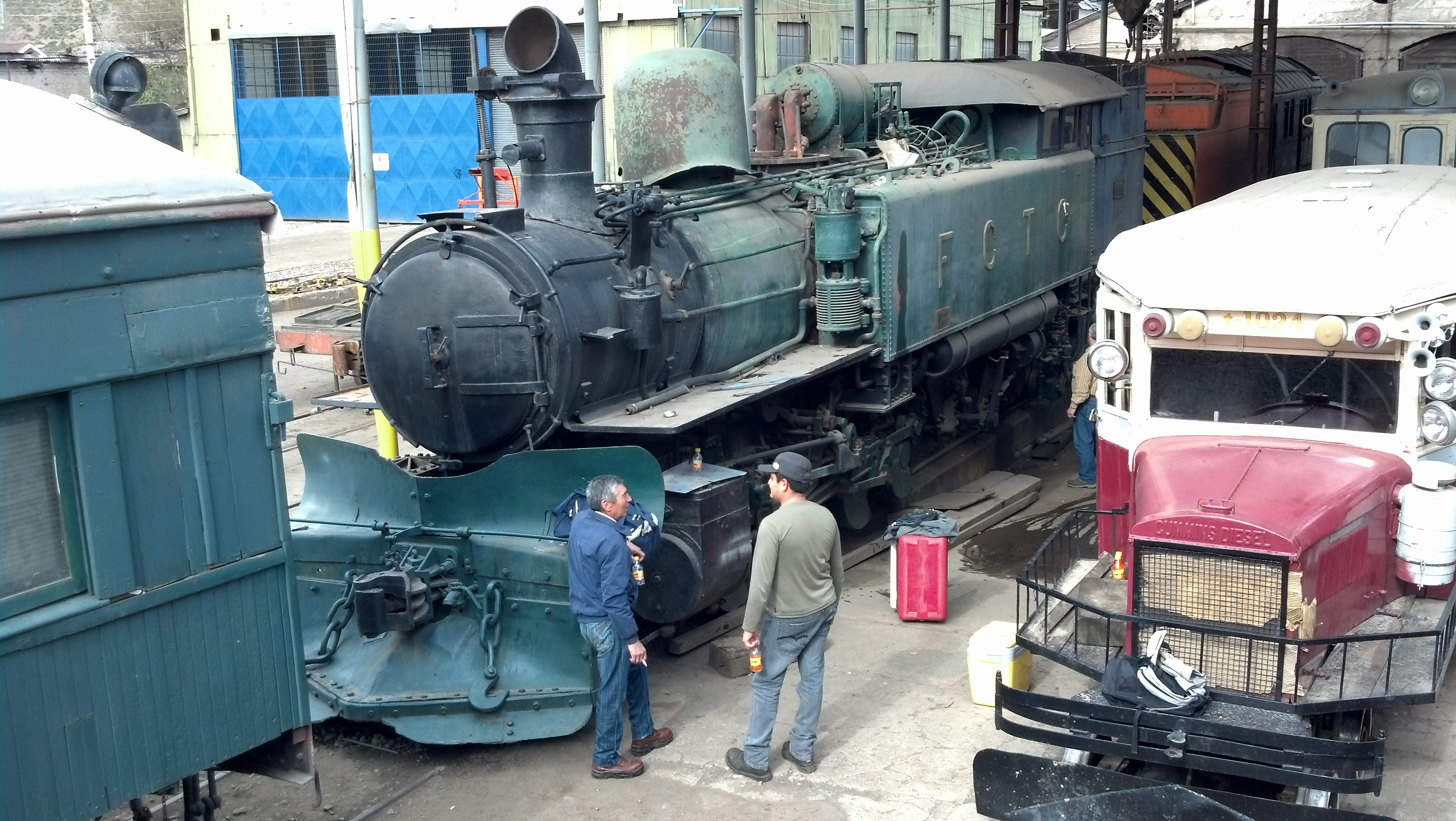
Kitson-Meyer 3348, under restoration at Los Andes, Chile.

The Kitson Meyer is a variant of the Meyer layout most closely associated with Kitson & Co. of Leeds, but was also built by other locomotive builders.The Meyer design was modified by moving the rear power unit further back and allowed the firebox to be between the two power units (as in a Garratt type locomotive), thus allowing a larger firebox. The length of the engine was increased, with the extra length behind the cab being used for additional water tanks. Some designs had an auxiliary chimney at the rear to avoid the need for an exhaust steam pipe running the length of the engine.

The design originated from an idea by Robert Stirling, Locomotive Superintendent of the Anglo-Chilian Nitrate and Railway Company. After placing an order with Kitsons for some conventional locos, he approached them with his ideas for an articulated loco. Kitsons further developed the idea, the first loco being constructed in 1894.

Kitson Meyers were widely used in South America, particularly on the Colombian and Chilean railways. It was regarded as the best performing of all articulated designs for railway lines that constantly curved. Four 2-6-0+0-6-2 tank locomotives also had a brief service in the Philippines, serving the Manila Railway and the Manila Railroad Companies between 1914 and 1925. However, fewer than 100 Kitson Meyers were ever built and it was generally thought that the design suffered from competition with the Garratt.

One Kitson-Meyer locomotive known to survive sits in a rather poor state of preservation in Taltal, an old nitrate port town in the Antofagasta Region of Chile. It is parked in front of two old passenger coaches from the nitrate railway at coordinates 25°24′17.6″S 70°28′57.6″W. Three Kitson Meyers of the Transandine Railways also have survived, one in Argentina (Tafi Viejo; as of 2013 in derelict condition) and two in Chile (#3348 at Los Andes station workshop, seen under restoration on 8-Sep-2013 and Serial #4664 Operating #3349 at the Museo Ferroviario de Santiago, Parque Quinta Normal, Santiago de Chile, in cosmetically restored condition). There are also six very derelict locos in the "Locomotive Graveyard" at Uyuni, Bolivia (October 2013).

== Bagnall Modified Meyer ==
A number of large narrow gauge industrial locomotives were built in the U.K. by W. G. Bagnall of Stafford. Generally, these were constructed on the Meyer principle as 0-4-4-0Ts, but were fitted with a circular firebox that did not project below the footplate. A number were built for sugarcane railways in South Africa one of which was imported into the USA and resides on the Cripple Creek and Victor Railway in Colorado where it can be seen in pieces today. The last example, maker's number 3024, named Monarch, was built in 1953 for Bowater's Railway at Sittingbourne in Kent and now resides on the Welshpool and Llanfair Light Railway.

== Sources ==
- Binns, Donald (2003) Kitson Meyer Articulated Locomotives Trackside Publications, Skipton, UK. ISBN 0-907941-37-0
