= Saxon V K =

Saxon V K DRG Class 99.61
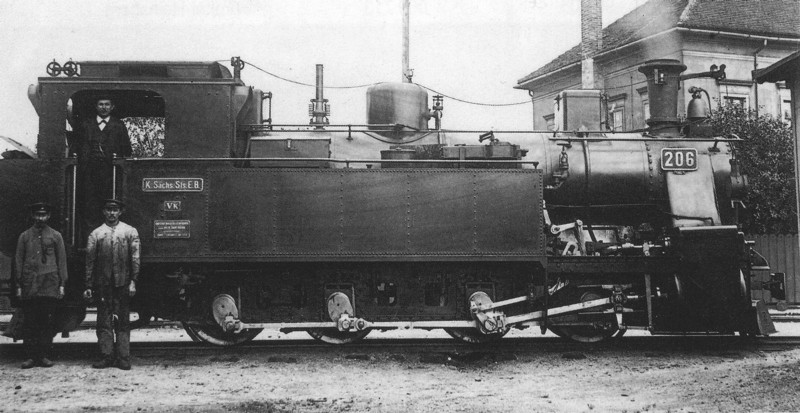
Type and origin
- Builder: Sächsische Maschinenfabrik, Chemnitz
- Build date: 1901–1907
- Total produced: 9
Specifications
- Configuration
  - Whyte: 0-8-0T
  - German: K 44.7
- Gauge: 750 mm (2 ft 5 1/2 in)
- Driver dia.: 855 mm (33 5/8 in)
- Minimum curve: 40 m (131 ft 2 3/4 in)
- Wheelbase
  - Overall: 3,900 mm (12 ft 9 1/2 in)
- Length
  - Over couplers: 8,950 mm (29 ft 4 1/4 in)
- Width: 2,170 mm (7 ft 1 7/16 in)
- Height: 3,080 mm (10 ft 1 1/4 in)
- Empty weight: 22.8 t
- Service weight: 28.8 t
- Fuel capacity: 0.96 t coal
- Water cap.: 2.4 m^{3} (530 imp gal)
- Boiler pressure: 14 kg/cm^{2} (1.37 MPa; 199 psi)
- Heating surface
  - Firebox: 0.97 m^{2} (10.4 sq ft)
  - Radiative: 4.22 m^{2} (45.4 sq ft)
  - Evaporative: 59.67 m^{2} (642.3 sq ft)
- Cylinders: 2
- High-pressure cylinder: 530 mm (20 7/8 in)
- Low-pressure cylinder: 340 mm (13 3/8 in)
- Piston stroke: 430 mm (16 15/16 in)
- Valve gear: Walschaerts (Heusinger)
Performance figures
- Maximum speed: 30 km/h (19 mph)
- Tractive effort
  - Starting: 43.64 kN
Career
- Numbers: K.Sä.St.E.: 201 – 209; DRG: 99 611 – 99 619
- Retired: 1934/1942

The Saxon Class V K were German 0-8-0T narrow gauge steam locomotives operated by the Royal Saxon State Railways which had been primarily intended for the Müglitztalbahn. In 1925 the Deutsche Reichsbahn incorporated arranged these locomotives as DRG Class 99.61.

== History ==
For the hilly line of the Müglitztalbahn from Mügeln to Geising-Altenberg the Sächsische Maschinenfabrik in Chemnitz developed an eight-coupled locomotive which, it was envisaged, would handle this route better that the hitherto deployed Saxon Classes I K and IV K. In 1901 and from 1905 to 1907 a total of nine locomotives were placed in service. Those built in 1905 had a slightly larger driver's cab.

Whilst the new type of drive using Klien-Lindner axles allowed the 0-8-0T engines to negotiate tight curves, in the end the new Class V K proved just as complicated and maintenance-intensive as the tried and tested IV K.

For that reason no more were procured, despite their better starting characteristics.

All nine engines, numbered 201 to 209 were taken over in 1920 by the Deutsche Reichsbahn and in 1925 were renumbered to 99 611 to 99 619.

Between 1934 and 1942 the locomotives were all retired. It is possible that several locomotives were left on the battlefields of the Second World War following duties at the front.

== Technical features ==
The boiler had the same dimensions as the Saxon IV K. The boiler feed was provided by two Friedmann injectors. The steam engine itself was a two-cylinder compound which drove the second coupled axle. The low-pressure cylinder on the right was set at an angle due to its large size. The first and fourth coupled axles were Klien-Lindner hollow axles which enabled an outside frame with Hall cranks. Two pull rods arranged in a cross enabled the transverse movement of the two hollow axles to be set by the same amount.

For braking, the locomotives were originally equipped with a steam brake and counterweight brake. In addition the locomotives were fitted for Heberlein brakes. But by 1920 they were given the new Körting vacuum brakes for engine and train.

The water supplies were carried in side tanks; the coal was stored in a bunker behind the cab.

== Duties ==
The six locomotives went into service on the Müglitztalbahn. Even after the appearance of the more powerful VI K they remained on this route. After the conversion of the Müglitztalbahn to standard gauge in the 1930s the locomotives were transferred to other lines. They were used on the Mügeln and Thum railway networks and the Taubenheim–Dürrhennersdorf narrow gauge railway.

== See also ==
- Royal Saxon State Railways
- List of Saxon locomotives and railbuses
- Narrow gauge railways in Saxony

== Literature ==
- Näbrich, Fritz; Meyer, Günter; Preuß, Reiner (1984). Lokomotiv-Archiv Sachsen 2 (in German). Berlin: transpress VEB Verlag für Verkehrswesen.
- Spielhoff, Lothar (1990). Länderbahn-Dampf-Lokomotiven. Band 1: Preußen, Mecklenburg, Oldenburg, Sachsen und Elsaß-Lothringen (in German). Stuttgart: Franckh'sche Verlagshandlung. ISBN 3-440-06145-0.
- Wagner, Wolfgang; Scheffler, Reiner (1996). II K (alt), III K und V K (in German). Egglham. ISBN 3-922138-60-8.
- Weisbrod, Manfred; Petznik, Wolfgang (1981). Dampflokomotiven deutscher Eisenbahnen, Baureihe 97–99 (EFA 1.4) (in German) (2nd ed.). Düsseldorf: Alba. pp. 162–164. ISBN 3-87094-087-5.
