= Saxon II K =

Class of 2 German Fairlie locomotives

K.Sächs.Sts.EB. II K
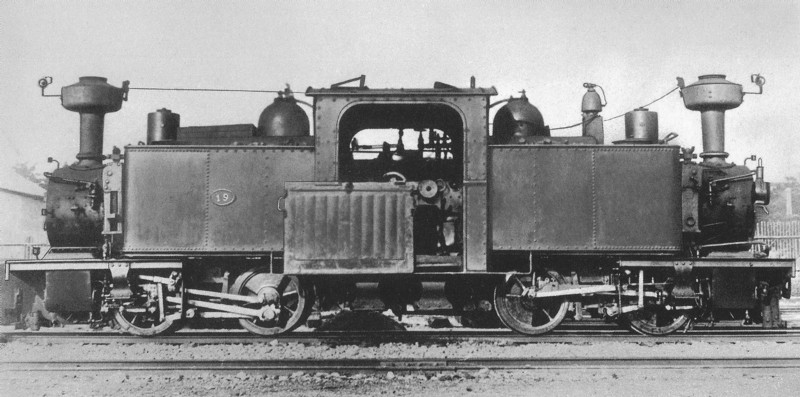
Type and origin
- Builder: Hawthorn Leslie & Company, Newcastle
- Build date: 1885
- Total produced: 2
Specifications
- Configuration
  - Whyte: 0-4-4-0T
  - UIC: B′B′ n4t
- Gauge: 750 mm (2 ft 5 1/2 in)
- Driver dia.: 813 mm (2 ft 8 in)
- Length
  - Over couplers: 8,948 mm (29 ft 4 1/4 in)
- Fuel capacity: 900 kg (2,000 lb) Coal
- Water cap.: 2.9 m^{3} (640 imp gal; 770 US gal)
- Boiler pressure: 10 kgf/in^{2} (152 kPa; 22.0 lbf/in^{2})
- Heating surface
  - Firebox: 2 × 0.6 m^{2} (6.5 sq ft)
- Cylinders: 4
- Cylinder size: 215 mm (8 7/16 in)
- Piston stroke: 355 mm (14 in)
- Valve gear: Heusinger
- Train brakes: Heberlein brake
Performance figures
- Maximum speed: 30 km/h (19 mph)
- Indicated power: not known
Career
- Numbers: 18, 19
- Retired: 1903, 1909

The Saxon II K (two K) were a class of two 0-4-4-0T double Fairlie locomotives built for the Royal Saxon State Railways with a gauge of 750 mm (2 ft 5 1/2 in). They were retired from service by 1909; in 1913 the classification was reused for pairs of I K locomotives coupled back-to-back. Consequently, there is a distinction between the class II K (old) and II K (new).

== History ==
Since 1881, numerous narrow-gauge lines, some of them with many bends and inclines, had been opened in Saxony, and the volume of traffic had steadily increased. The performance of the I K initially used was soon no longer sufficient. Therefore, in 1885, Hawthorn, Leslie and Company of Newcastle upon Tyne in England delivered two double Fairlie locomotives for 51.771 Marks each. Both locomotives were placed in class Hth F TK, signifying that there were Fairlie type (F) tank locomotives (T) with 750 mm (2 ft 5 1/2 in) gauge (K) from the manufacturer Hawthorn (Hth). They were given the fleet numbers 18 and 19. From 1896 the classification was changed to K II, and from 1900 to II K.

The locomotives were not successful. Above all, the conditions for the locomotive crew were completely poor. Especially cramped for the fireman in order to service both fireboxes in his narrow side of the cab with the necessary coal. In addition, the locomotives were too heavy for most routes.

No further procurement was made in favour of class III K. The two locomotives were retired in 1903 (No. 18) and 1909 (No. 19).

== Technical features ==
The locomotives had a double ended boiler with two fireboxes. They had four saturated steam cylinders with a Walschaerts valve gear (Heusinger) control for each engine. Their top speed was 30 km/h (19 mph)
