= Saxon I K =

Class of German narrow-gauge 0-6-0T locomotives

Saxon I K DRG Class 99.750–752 ZOJE 1 Mandau to 5 Zittau
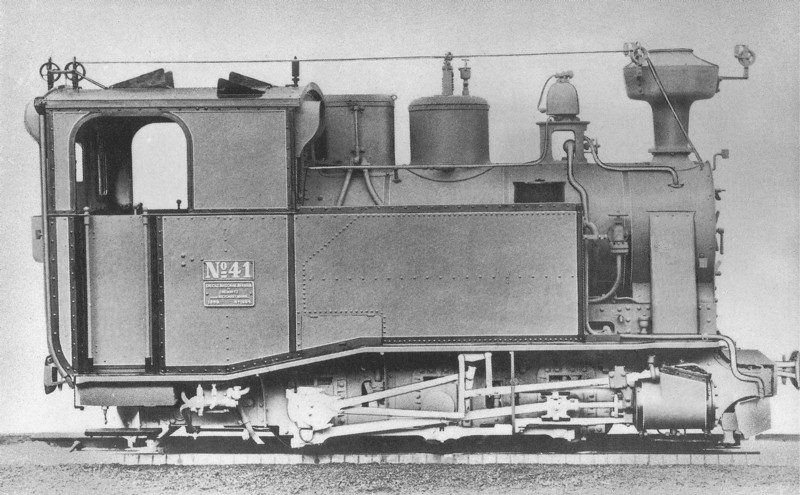
Type and origin
- Builder: Sächsische Maschinenfabrik, Chemnitz
- Build date: 1881–1892
- Total produced: K.Sä.St.E.: 39; ZOJE: 5
Specifications
- Configuration
  - Whyte: 0-6-0T
- Gauge: 750 mm (2 ft 5 1/2 in)
- Driver dia.: 760 mm (2 ft 5 7/8 in)
- Wheelbase
  - Overall: 1,800 mm (5 ft 10 3/4 in)
- Length
  - Over couplers: 5,280 mm (17 ft 3 3/4 in) or; 5,630 mm (18 ft 5 3/4 in) or; 5,740 mm (18 ft 10 in)
- Height: 2,985 mm (9 ft 9 1/2 in)
- Axle load: 5.1–5.6 t (5.0–5.5 long tons; 5.6–6.2 short tons)
- Adhesive weight: 15.3–16.8 t (15.1–16.5 long tons; 16.9–18.5 short tons)
- Empty weight: 11.9–13.3 t (11.7–13.1 long tons; 13.1–14.7 short tons)
- Service weight: 15.3–16.8 t (15.1–16.5 long tons; 16.9–18.5 short tons)
- Fuel capacity: 500 kg (1,100 lb)
- Water cap.: 1.5 m^{3} (330 imp gal; 400 US gal)
- Boiler
- No. of heating tubes: 108
- Heating tube length: 1,960 mm (6 ft 5 1/4 in)
- Boiler pressure: 12 kgf/cm^{2} (1,180 kPa; 171 lbf/in^{2})
- Heating surface
  - Firebox: 0.66 m^{2} (7.1 sq ft)
  - Radiative: 3.1 m^{2} (33 sq ft)
  - Tubes: 26.6 m^{2} (286 sq ft)
  - Evaporative: 29.72 m^{2} (319.9 sq ft)
- Cylinders: 2
- Cylinder size: 240 mm (9 7/16 in)
- Piston stroke: 380 mm (14 15/16 in)
- Valve gear: Allan
- Train brakes: Heberlein brake
Performance figures
- Maximum speed: 30 km/h (19 mph)
- Indicated power: 120 PS (88.3 kW; 118 hp)
- Tractive effort
  - Starting: 20.6 kN (4,600 lbf)
Career
- Numbers: K.Sä.St.E.: 1–4, 6–17, 20–34, 37–42, 47–53; ZOJE: 1–5; DRG: 99 7501–7527
- Retired: 1929 (last one)

The Saxon I K (one-K) were a class of German narrow-gauge 0-6-0T locomotives of the Royal Saxon State Railways (Königlich Sächsischen Staatseisenbahnen, K.Sä.St.E.) with a track gauge of 750 mm (2 ft 5 1/2 in). In 1925, Deutsche Reichsbahn grouped these locomotives into their DRG class 99.750–752.

== History ==
I K No. 54 approaching Loreleifelsen on the Pressnitz Valley Railway (August 2009)

From 1881 onwards, numerous narrow-gauge lines were opened in the Kingdom of Saxony, some of which were built with many inclines and curves. For this purpose, the Royal Saxon State Railways procured 39 small, six-coupled tank locomotives from the Sächsische Maschinenfabrik vormals Richard Hartmann AG in Chemnitz. From 1890 another five examples were delivered to the private Zittau-Oybin-Jonsdorfer Eisenbahn-Gesellschaft (ZOJE), which were taken over by the K.SäSt.E. in 1906; and in 1907 were given operating numbers 49 to 53 by the K.SäSt.E.

The locomotives built for the K.Sä.St.E. were initially placed in the class H V TK, which was changed to K I in 1896 and I K in 1900.

During the World War I, twenty locomotives were in use on the Heeresfeldbahn. Five of them remained in Poland in 1919. During the World War II, two of them were added to the inventory of the Deutsche Reichsbahn and designated as 99 2504 and 99 2505 respectively. They remained on their Polish routes and were returned to the Polish State Railways (PKP) after 1945. The last of them was scrapped in the Gdansk area in 1970.

Thirty-nine locomotives were still part of the Deutsche Reichsbahn in 1920. The new numbers 99 7501 to 99 7527 were provided in the 1925 renumbering plan. A little later, however, all locomotives still owned by the state railway in Saxony were withdrawn.

=== II K (new) ===
See also Saxon II K (old)

With the increasing volume of traffic, the performance of the I K was soon no longer sufficient and – where the tracks allowed it – they were replaced by newer, more powerful locomotives such as the class IV K. In order to be able to use the available I K locomotives more effectively, the four first-built units were experimentally combined into two double locomotives in 1913. For this purpose, the rear wall of the locomotives' cabs were removed and two locomotive were coupled cab-to-cab. The locomotives were given a common regulator (throttle), but the controls remained separate. The converted locomotives received the class designation II K (the second use of this classification). It was planned to convert further locomotives in this way, but due to the First World War (a lack of locomotives due to the loan of vehicles to the Heeresfeldbahnen) and the unpopularity with the staff as well as the inadequacies in operation, this project was abandoned.

The first locomotives converted were fleet numbers 1 and 4, which became 61 A / B. The second locomotive was the 62 A / B, which was converted from the I K numbers 2 and 3. However, this was separated again in 1916 due to a lack of locomotives, and the individual vehicles ran under their old numbers again.

The II K 61 A/B was assigned the new number 99 7751 in 1923, but it was withdrawn in 1924 before the renumbering plan was finalized.

== Technical features ==
The boiler was of the Crampton type, riveted, with two rings. Two non-lifting Friedmann injectors were used to feed the boiler. The chimney was equipped with a Kobel spark arrester, the first batch had this in a conical design.

The drive train consisted of two cylinders mounted outside the frame, with slide valves, and driving the third axle via Allan valve gear. The axles were rigidly mounted in the frame. Fleet numbers 27 to 30 were given a Klien-Lindner hollow axle at the front to improve the running through tight curves.

The locomotive was braked using a counterweight brake. To brake the train, the cable reel for the Heberlein brake on the rear wall of the driver's cab was used.

The water supply was housed in side tanks, while the coal bunker was in front of the cab on the fireman's side.

== Service ==
The class I K was once used on almost all Saxon narrow-gauge railways. After the construction of the more powerful classes III K and IV K, the I K were mainly used on routes with light traffic. The last locations were the Zittau railway station and the Kohlmühle – Hohnstein, Klingenberg-Colmnitz – Oberdittmannsdorf routes and the network around Mügeln.

After their retirement, seven I K locomotives were sold to industry as factory locomotives. The former number 12 was sold to the Schmiedeberg Ironworks in 1923, where it was in service until 1963; it was scrapped in 1964.

After 1945, the Polish State Railways used the last two locomotives that remained in Poland on the remaining section of the Zittau – Hermsdorf line that was now in Poland.

== New build I K ==
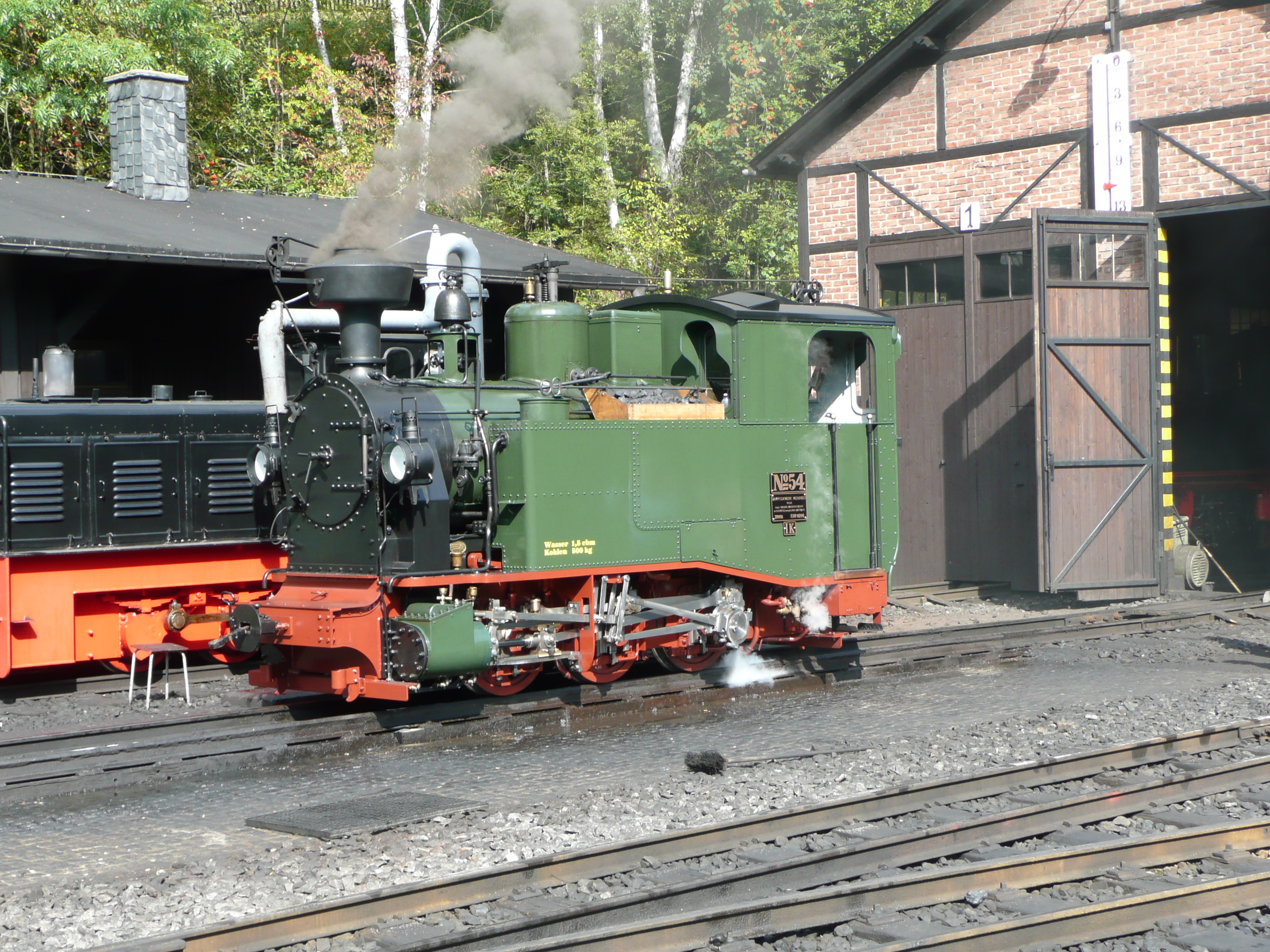
No. 54 in Jöhstadt station (August 2009)

As part of the opening event for the "125 Years of Narrow Gauge Railways in Saxony" anniversary, the Association for the Promotion of Saxon Narrow Gauge Railways (Verein zur Förderung Sächsischer Schmalspurbahnen e.V., VSSB) announced on 12 January 2006 the project to build a new class I K locomotive. Since the original manufacturer no longer exists, the building was launched as a "network project". With the support of sponsors (donor shares were issued for the project) and companies, a large part of the components could be manufactured inexpensively. The Meiningen Steam Locomotive Works was selected for the overall assembly and manufacture of the boiler.

A budget of €1.5 million was planned for the new building project. Since many of the components were made available free of charge by the companies involved, the calculated total costs fell to around one million euros. In November 2008, most of the – such as the driver's cab, steam boiler and chassis parts – were completed. In contrast to the riveted locomotives from the state railway era, the new building was largely made as a welded construction, so visible rivet heads are dummies. The machine was also equipped with a Körting vacuum brake. On 16 January 2009, final assembly began in the Meiningen Steam Locomotive Works and was completed in June 2009. In continuation of the historical series of numbers (which ended with fleet number 53), the newly built locomotive was given the number 54.

It was driven the first few meters under its own steam on 16 June 2009 in Meiningen. On 4 July 2009, the new locomotive was christened and officially put into service in the narrow-gauge area of Radebeul Ost station. The new locomotive 54, which also bears the computer number 99 7528, was initially at home on the Preßnitztalbahn in Jöhstadt. On 30 August 2009, the locomotive was first used as scheduled in front of the museum trains between Jöhstadt and Steinbach. After the dissolution of the Association for the Promotion of Saxon Narrow Gauge Railways, the Saxon Narrow Gauge Railways Foundation (Stiftung Sächsische Schmalspurbahnen) has owned the locomotive since 2015 and has housed it with the Saxon-Upper Lusatian Railway Company (SOEG) from summer 2015. This does not change anything in the previous operating concept.

Since 2016, the I K No. 54 has had a suitable historical train, the "I K train", consisting of two-axle passenger cars, with which trips from circa 1900 can be offered. This train, which is based in Zittau, can travel on all existing narrow-gauge railways with a gauge of 750 mm.

New build Saxon I K

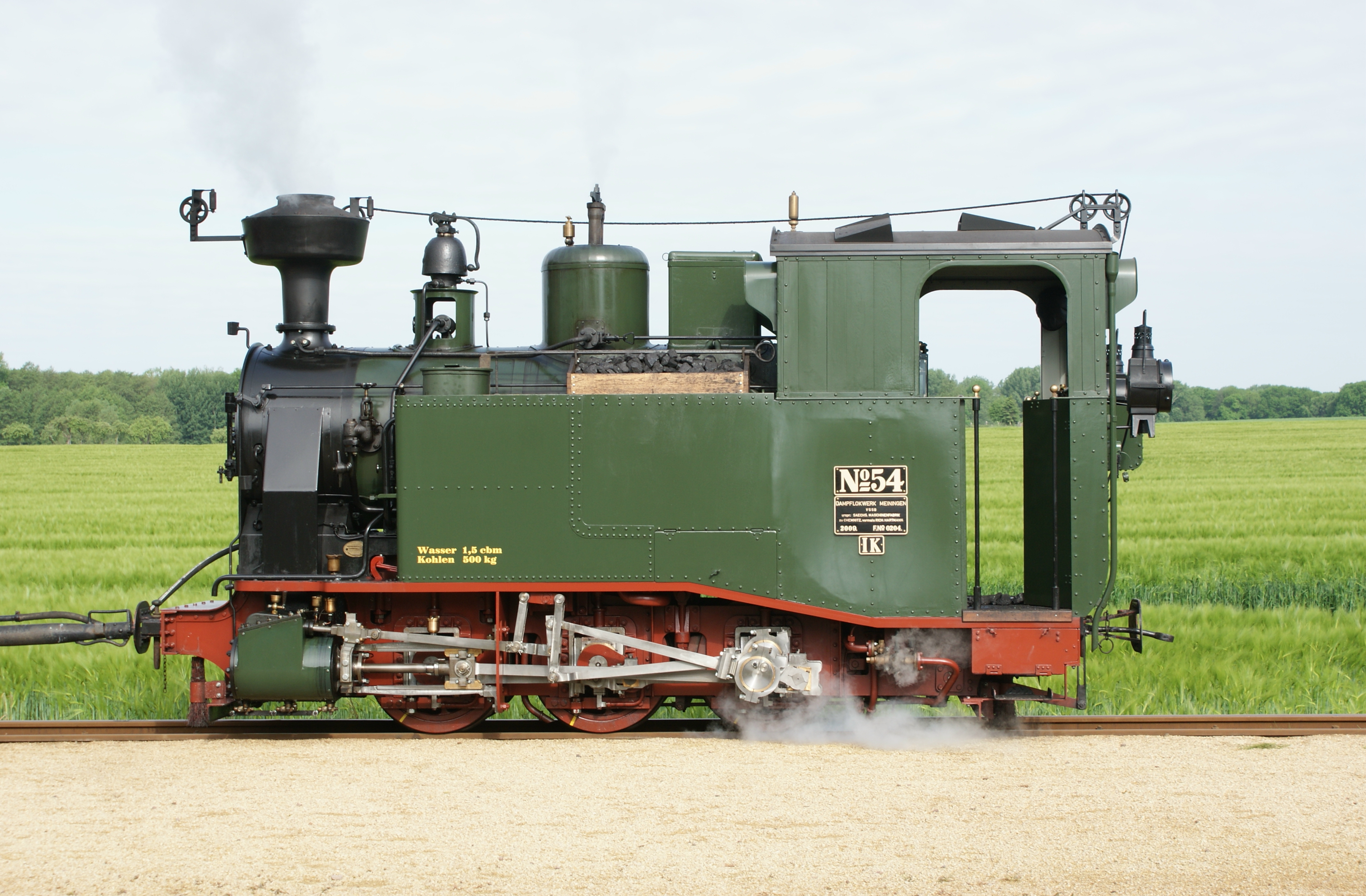
Naundorf, June 2010

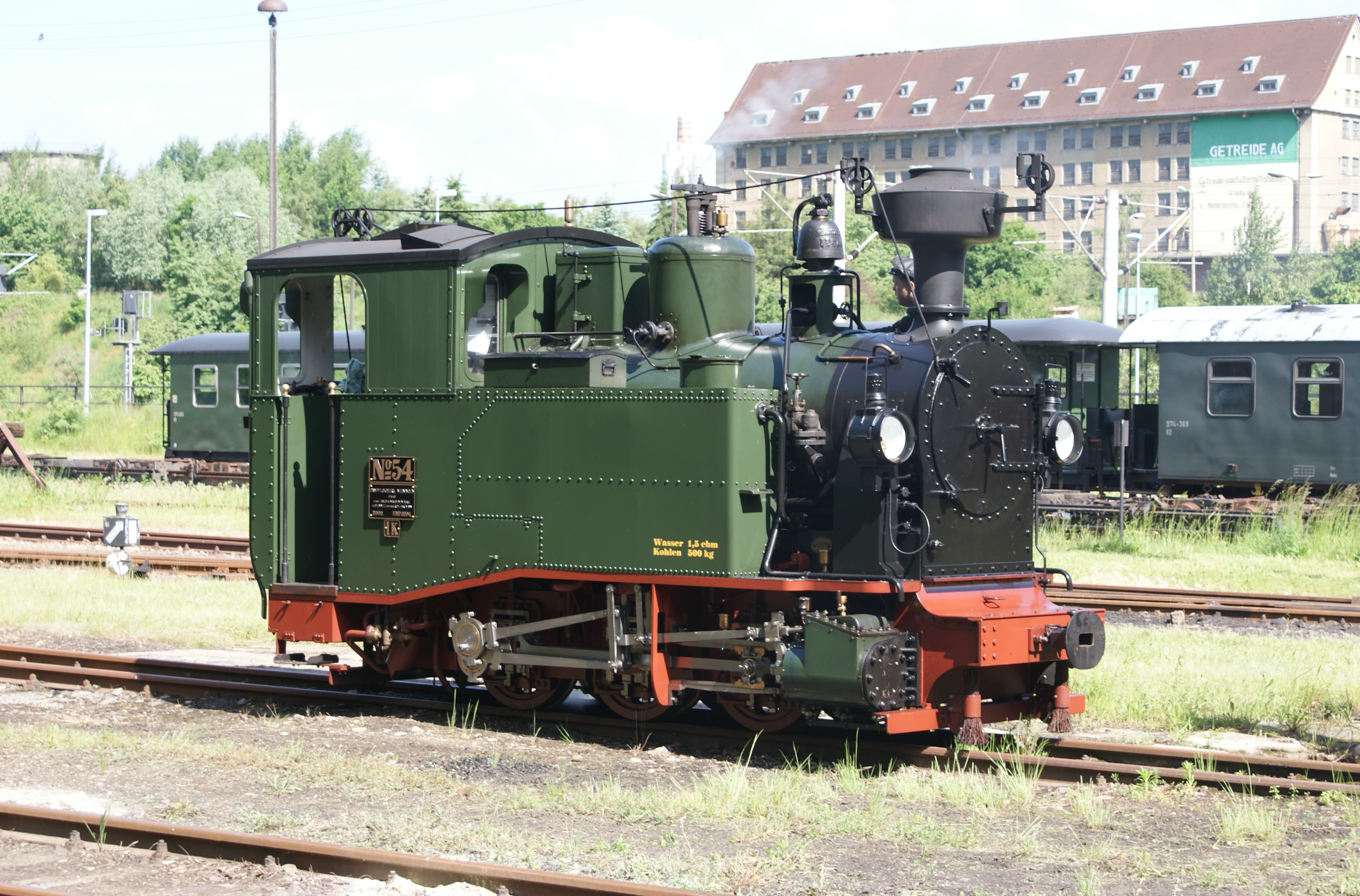
Oschatz, June 2010

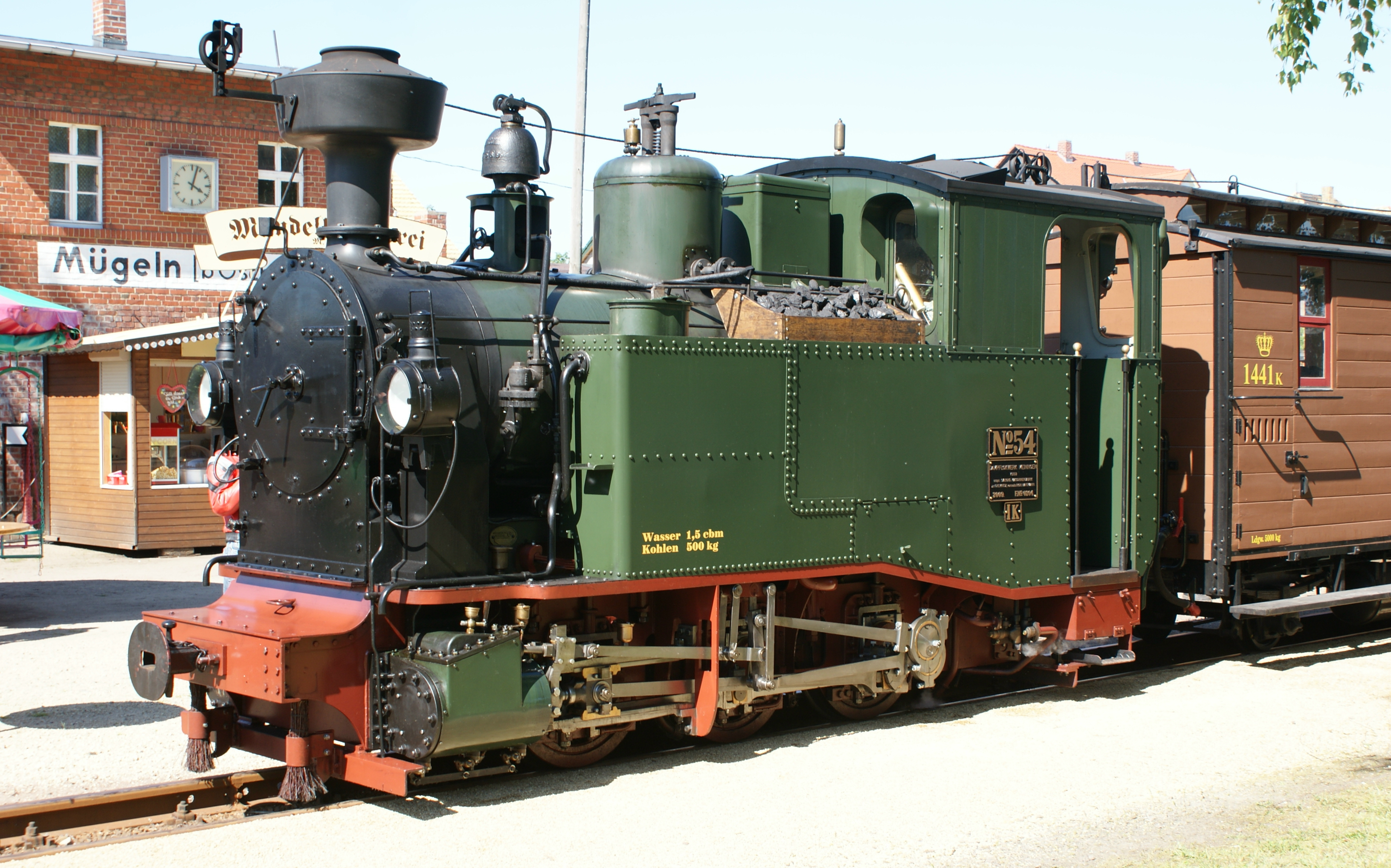
Mügeln, June 2010

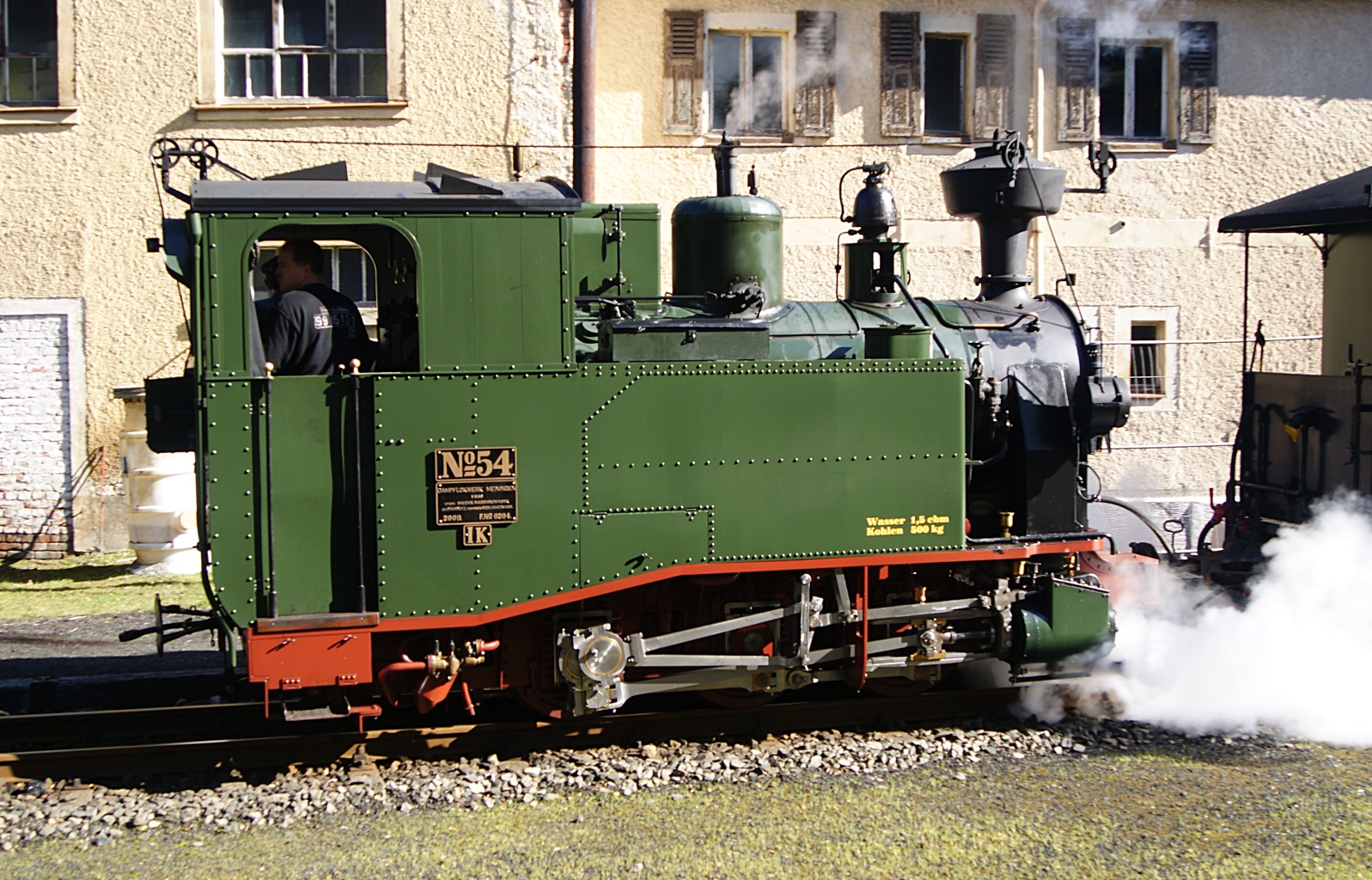
Schlössel station, October 2010

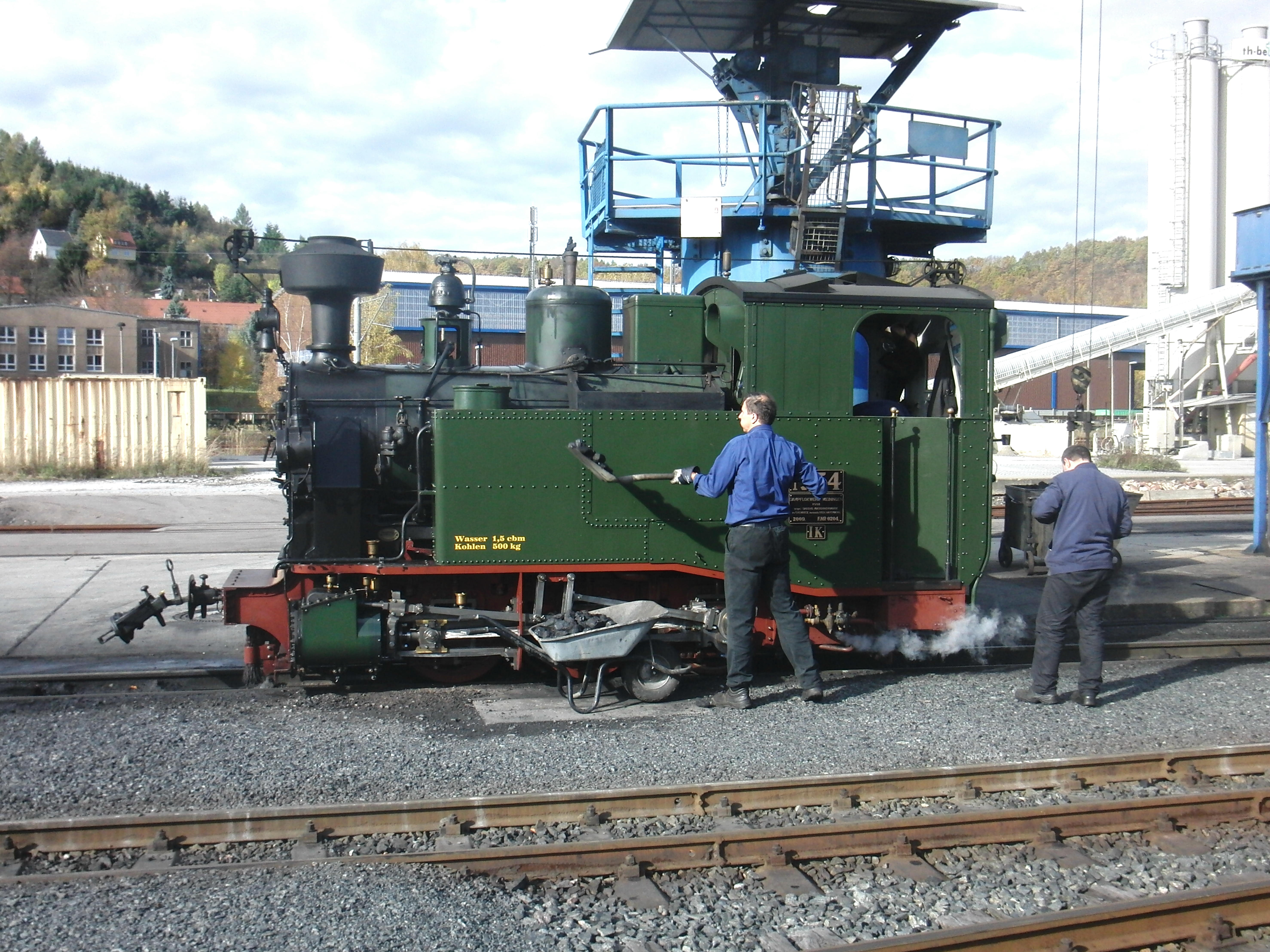
Manual coaling-up in Hainsberg

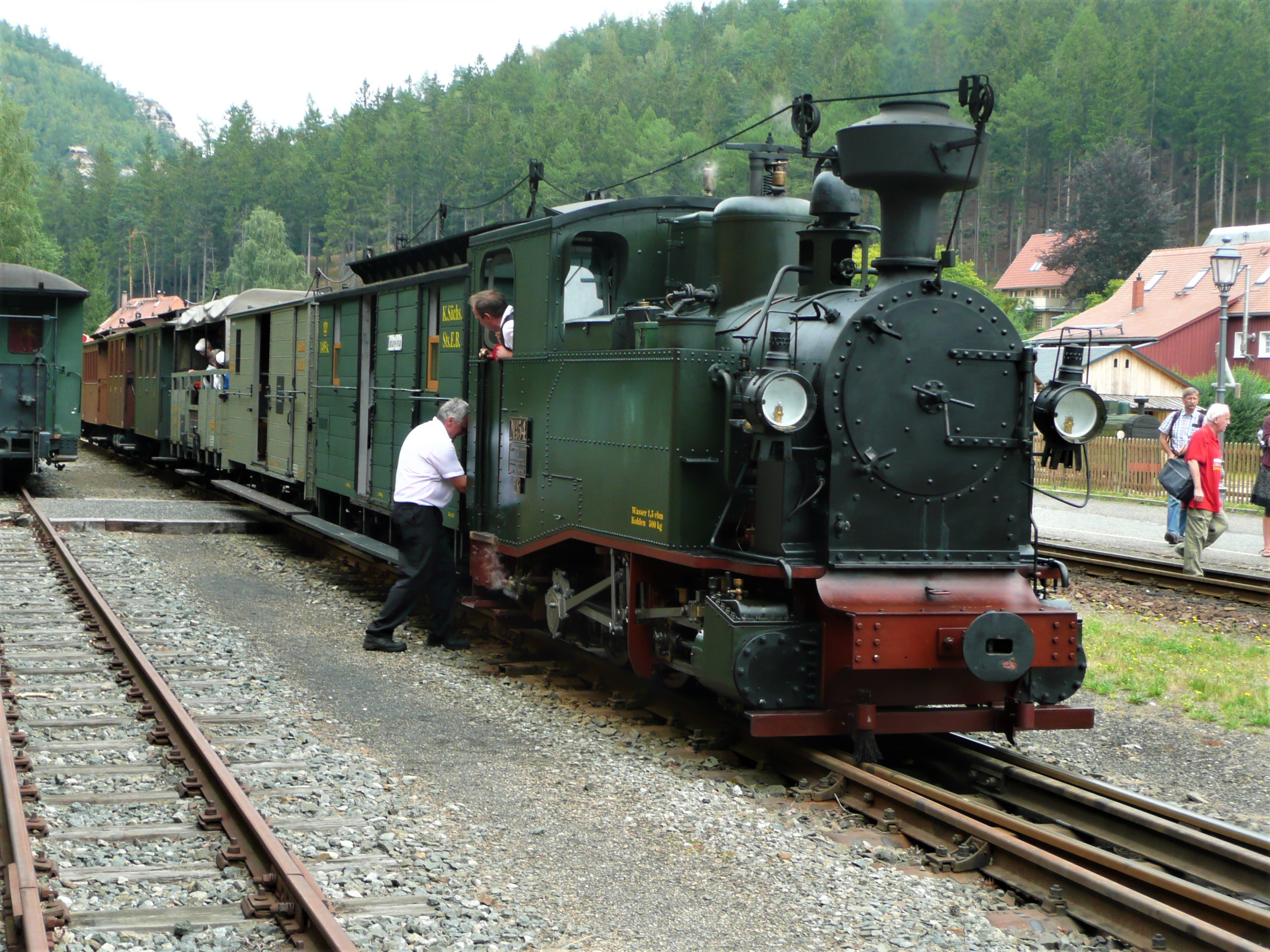
IK-train at the "Historik Mobil" event Oybin station, 2019
