= Matheran Light Railway Locomotives 1 to 4 =

MLR nos. 1-4
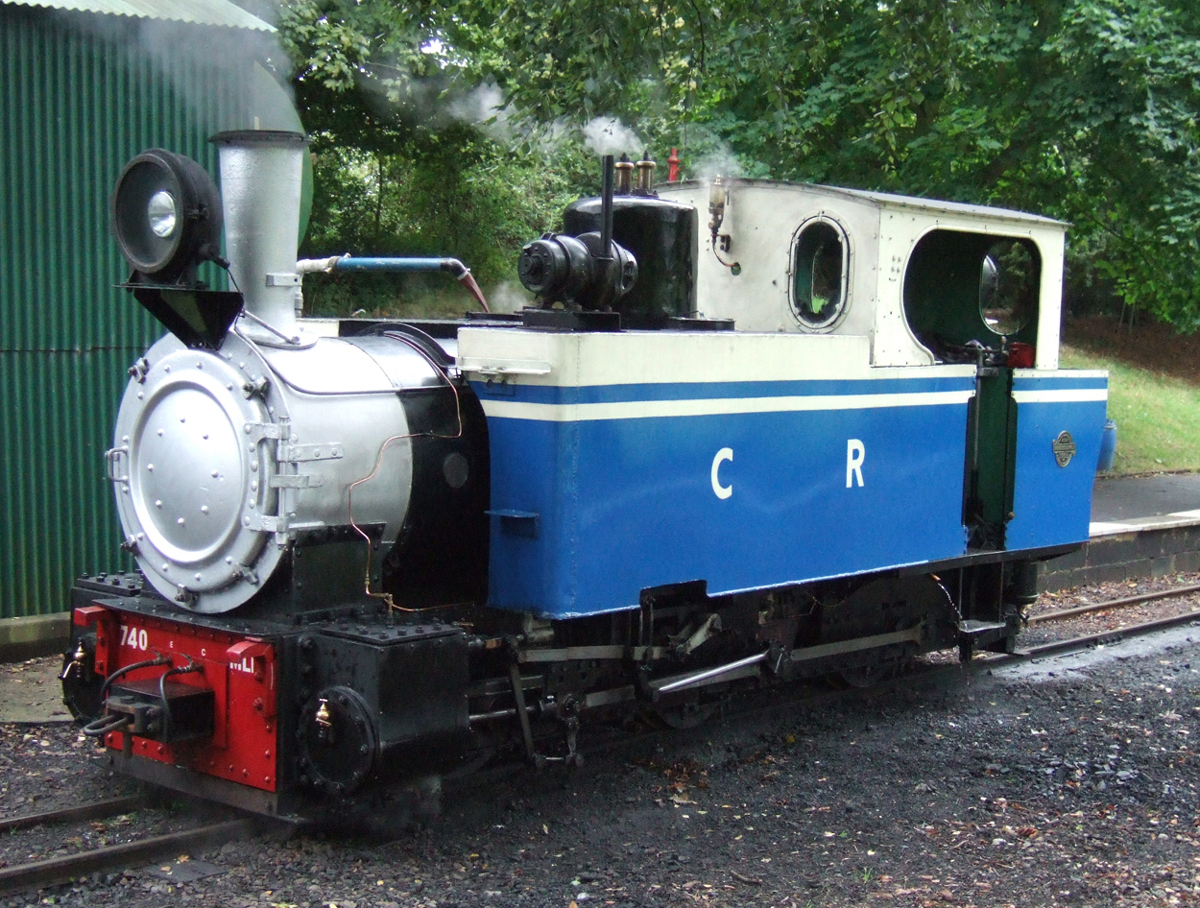
- MLR no.740
Type and origin
- Power type: Steam
- Builder: Orenstein & Koppel
- Serial number: 1766, 2342, 2343, 1777
- Build date: 1905, 1907
- Total produced: 4
Specifications
- Configuration
  - Whyte: 0-6-0T
- Gauge: 2 ft (610 mm)
- Driver dia.: 30 in (0.762 m)
- Loco weight: 15 tons (empty), 17 tons (working)
- Water cap.: 450 imp gal (2,000 L; 540 US gal)
- Firebox
  - Grate area: 7 sq ft (0.65 m^{2})
- Boiler pressure: 176 psi
- Heating surface: 452 sq ft (42.0 m^{2})
- Cylinders: 2
- Cylinder size: 11.81 in × 13.78 in (300 mm × 350 mm)
Performance figures
- Tractive effort: 81,101 lbf (360.76 kN) at 85% boiler pressure
Career
- Operators: Matheran Hill Railway
- Numbers: MLR 1-4 (original); MLR 738-741 (All-India numbers)
- First run: 1907
- Retired: 1982
- Disposition: All four preserved

MLR nos. 1-4 were four steam locomotives that operated on the Matheran Hill Railway, supplied by German engineering company Orenstein and Koppel. These locomotives served the railway from its inauguration in 1907, until 1982, when they were withdrawn from service, and completely replaced by diesel locomotives.

To navigate the tight curves on the MLR, the locomotives were fitted with an articulated wheel design, based on a patent by one John Clark in 1870. The design allowed for the rods to remain parallel to the engine at all times, while the wheels would follow the track's curves. The driving axles were Klien-Lindners.

The locomotives served on the line exclusively until 1965, when diesel traction was introduced on the line. Eventually, the four engines were retired in 1982, with all of them preserved at various locations.

== Preserved examples ==
Out of the four Locomotives, only three remain in India, while the fourth has been transported to the UK in 1986, where it passed through multiple owners.

No.738 is plinthed at a mini-garden near the premises of the Neral Toy Train station. No. 739 is situated at National Rail Museum, New Delhi, while No. 741 is plinthed within the yard premises of Matheran Railway Station. No.740 was the locomotive ferried to UK, and was acquired by Amberley Chalk Pits Museum. It was then overhauled to working order. Between 2003 and 2008, it was on service on Leighton Buzzard Railway After a period at the South Tynedale Railway it was sold to the Darnall Locomotive and Railway Heritage Trust.

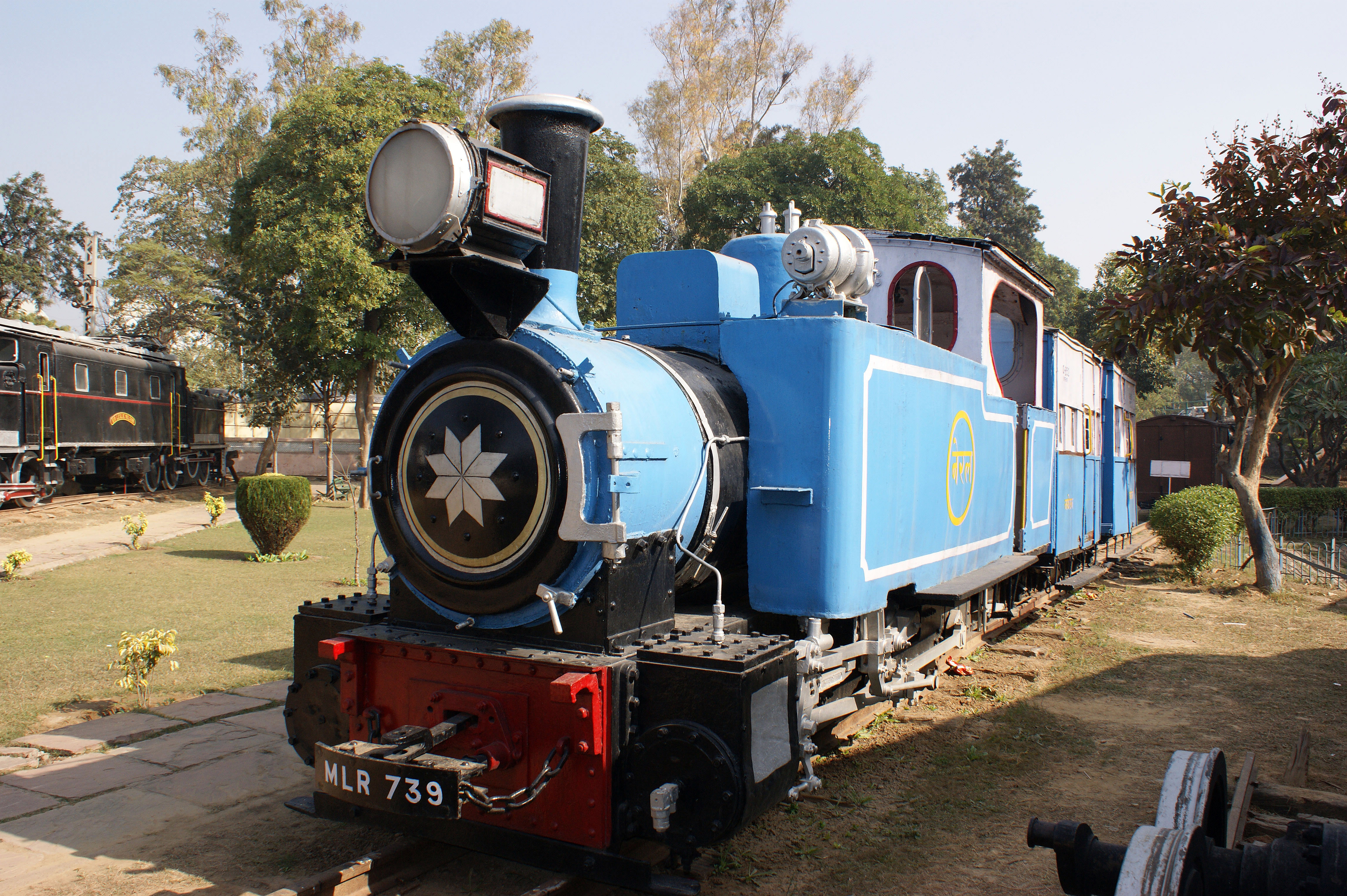
Locomotive MLR-739

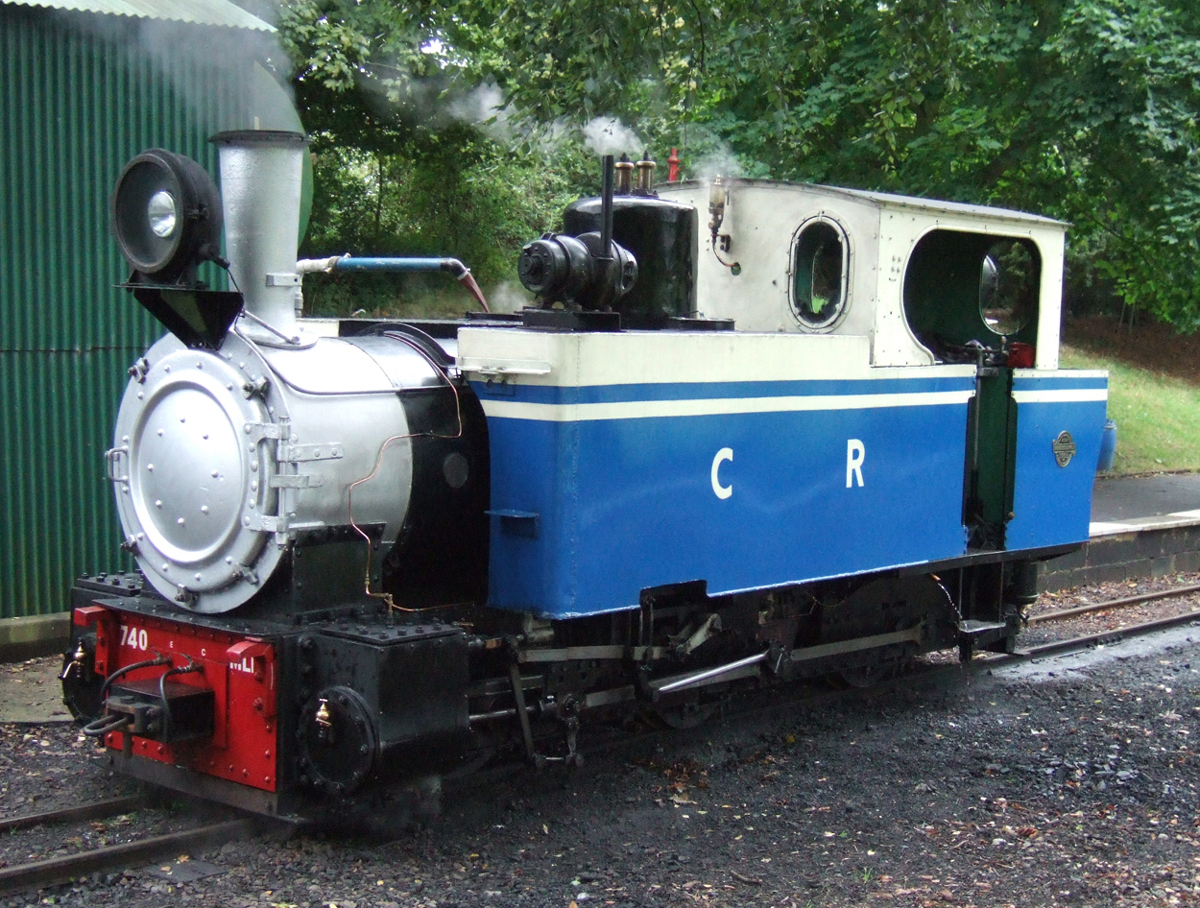
Locomotive MLR-740

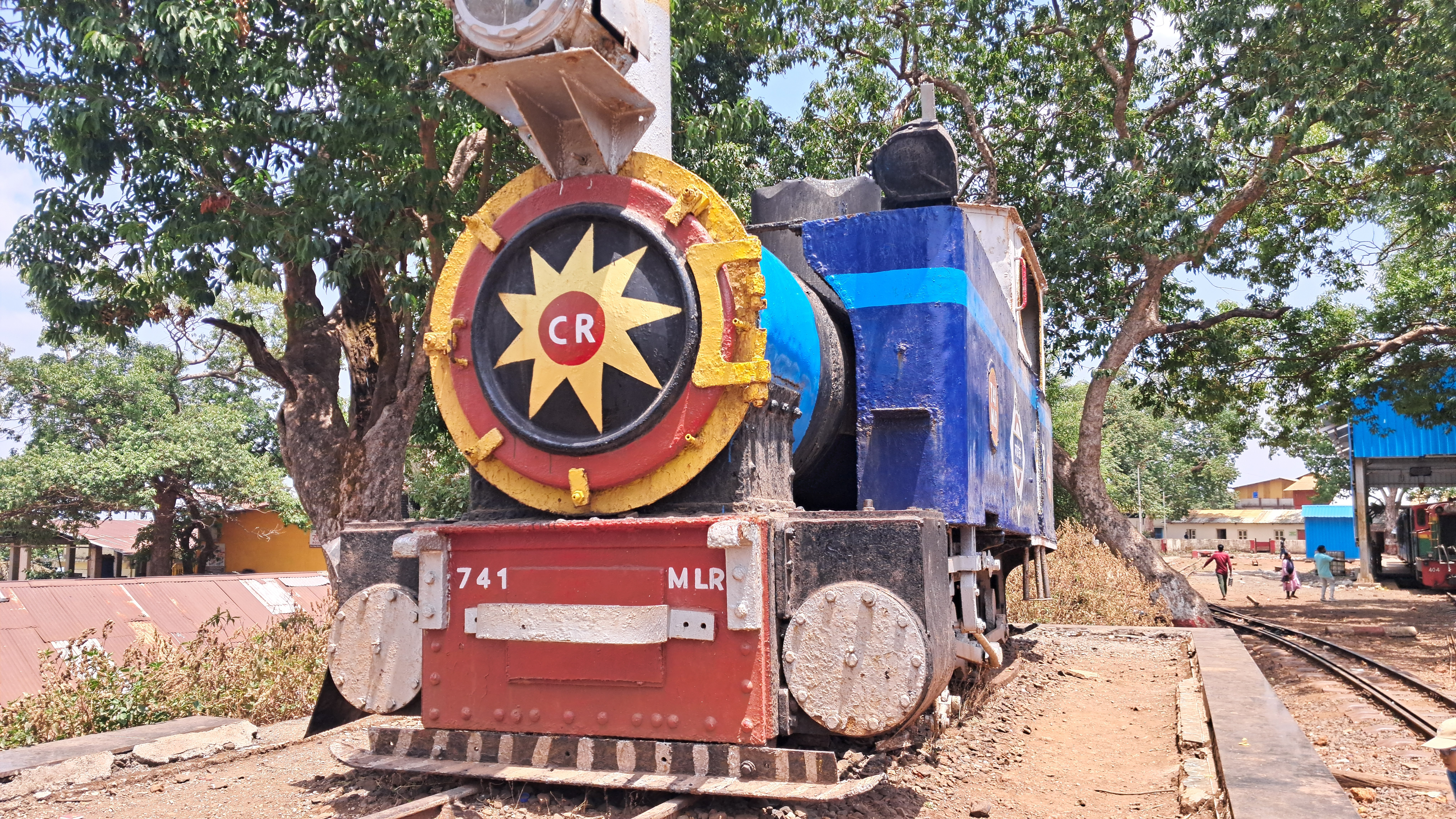
Locomotive MLR-741

== Gallery ==
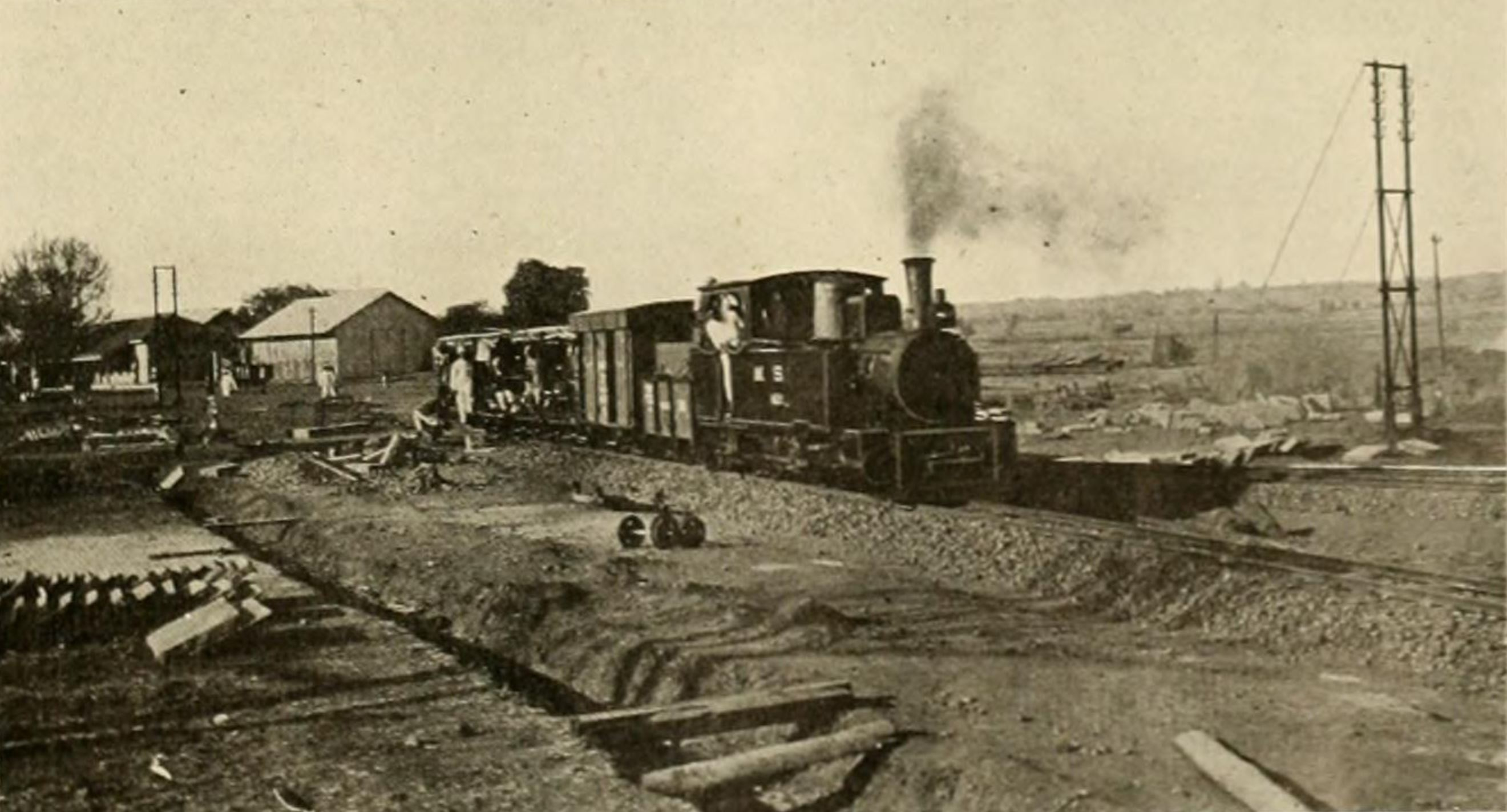
A Train departing Neral station: Sometime between 1904 and 1907

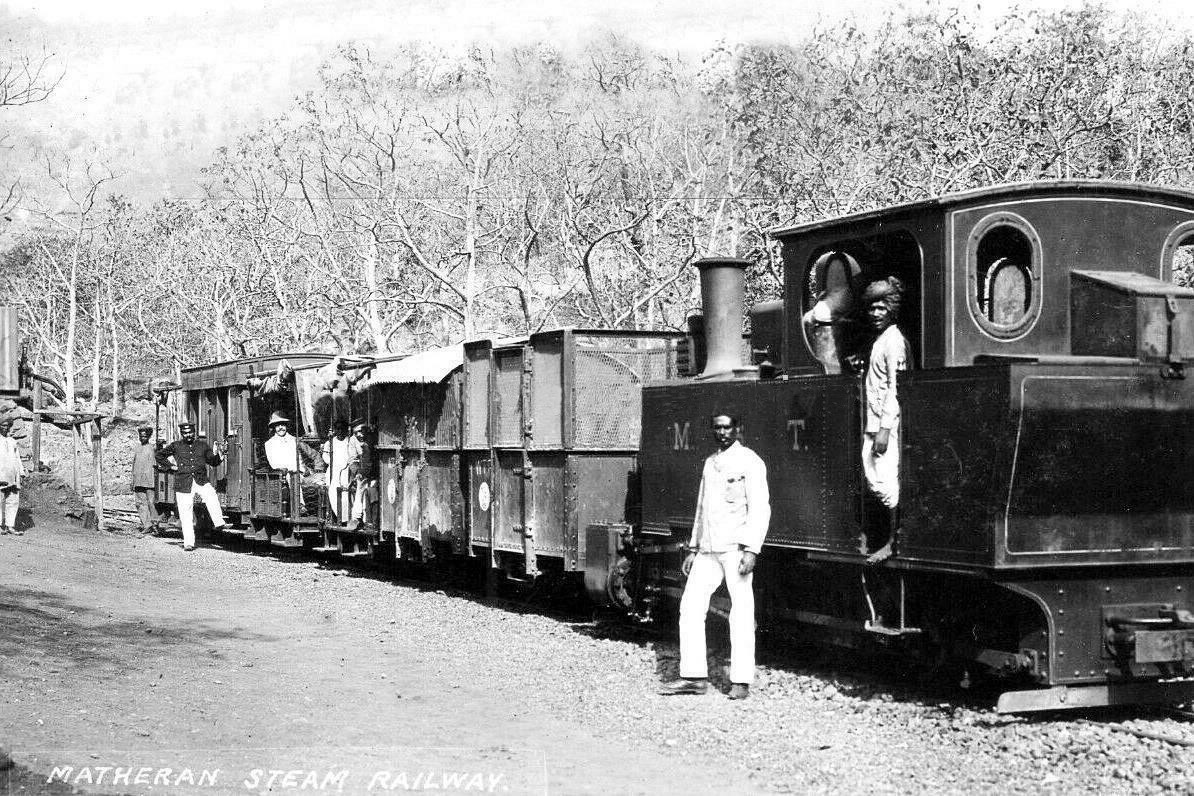
Photo of one of the locomotives on a train, around 1910

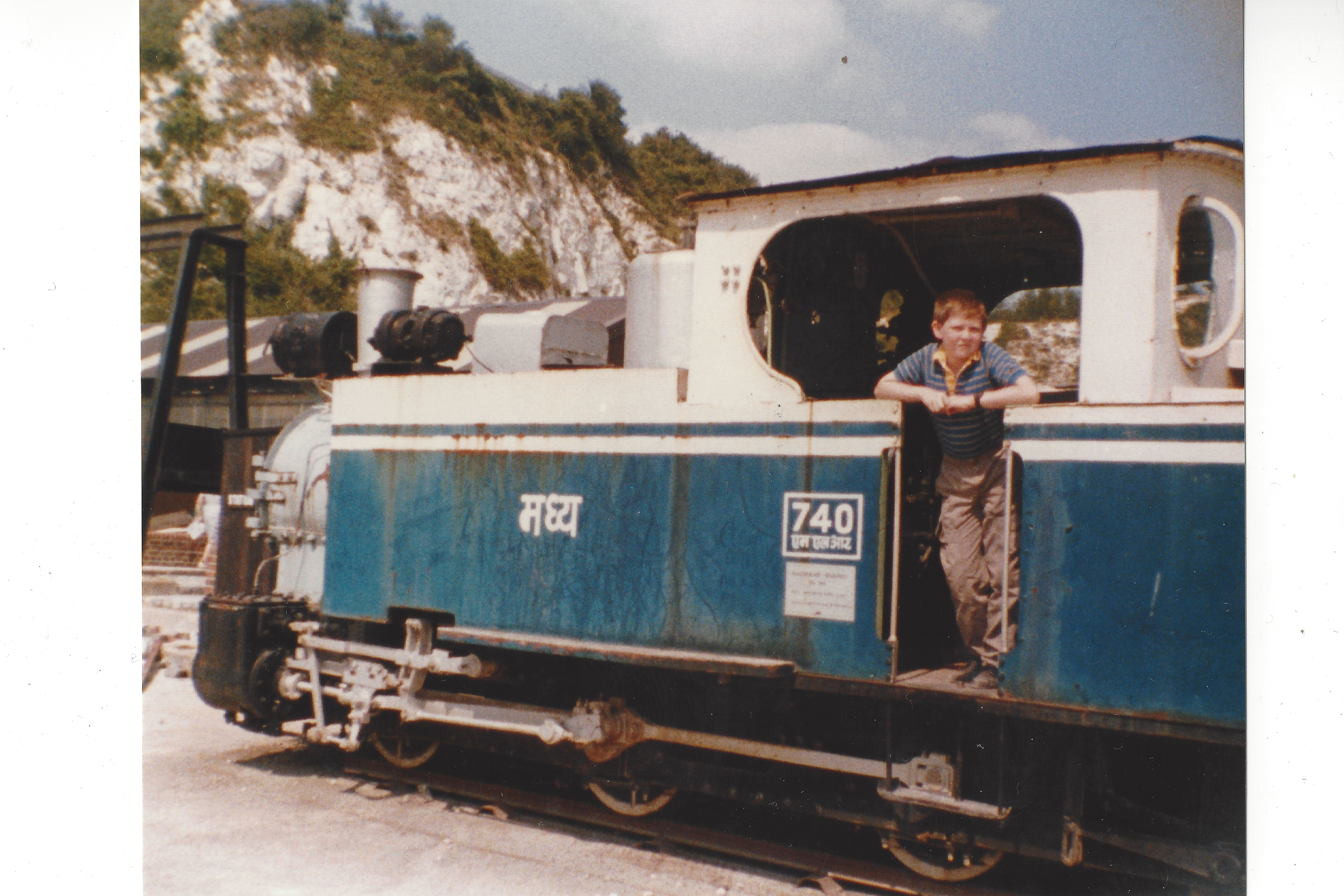
MLR 740 at the Amberley Chalk Pits Museum

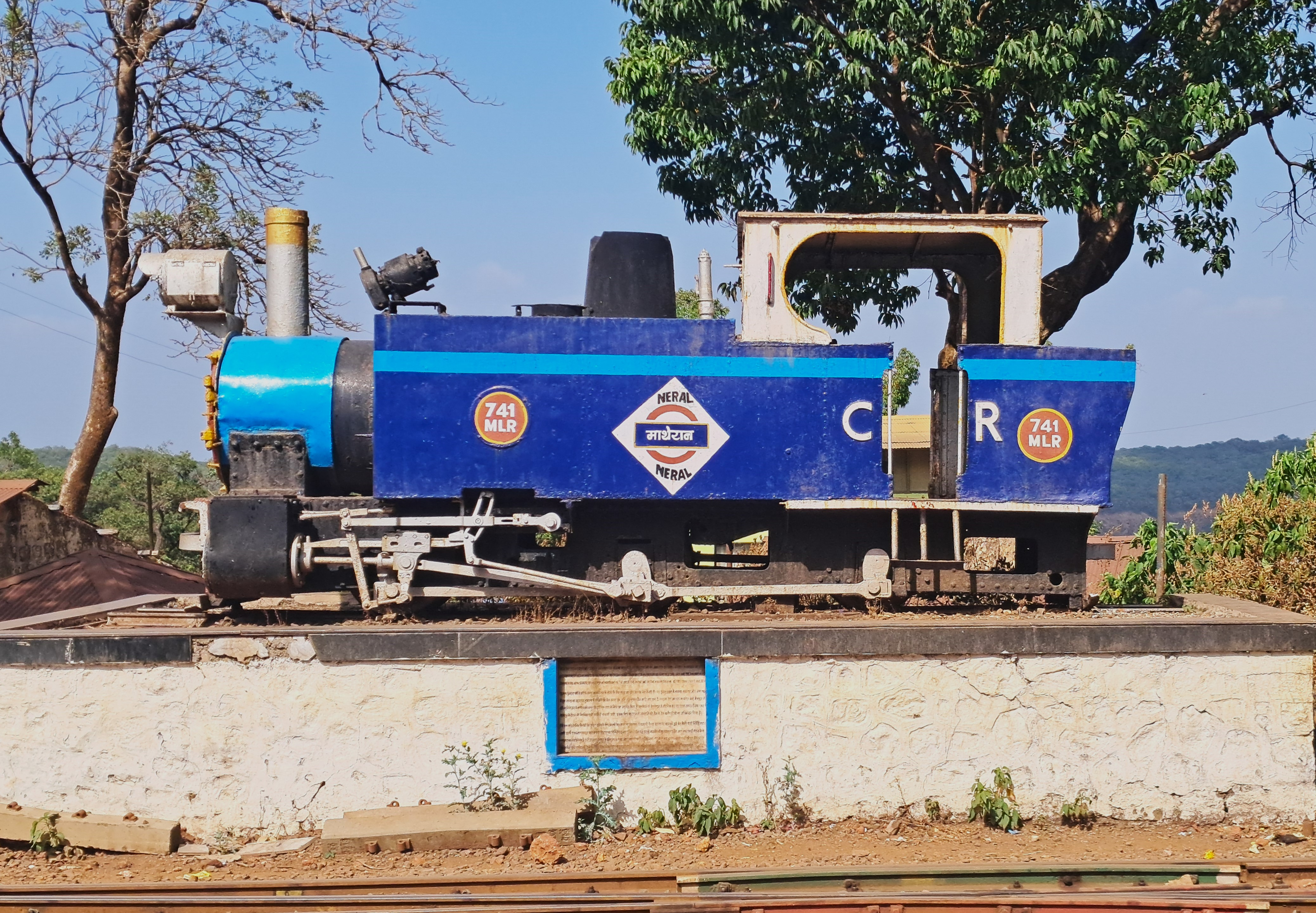
MLR 741 plinthed at Matheran

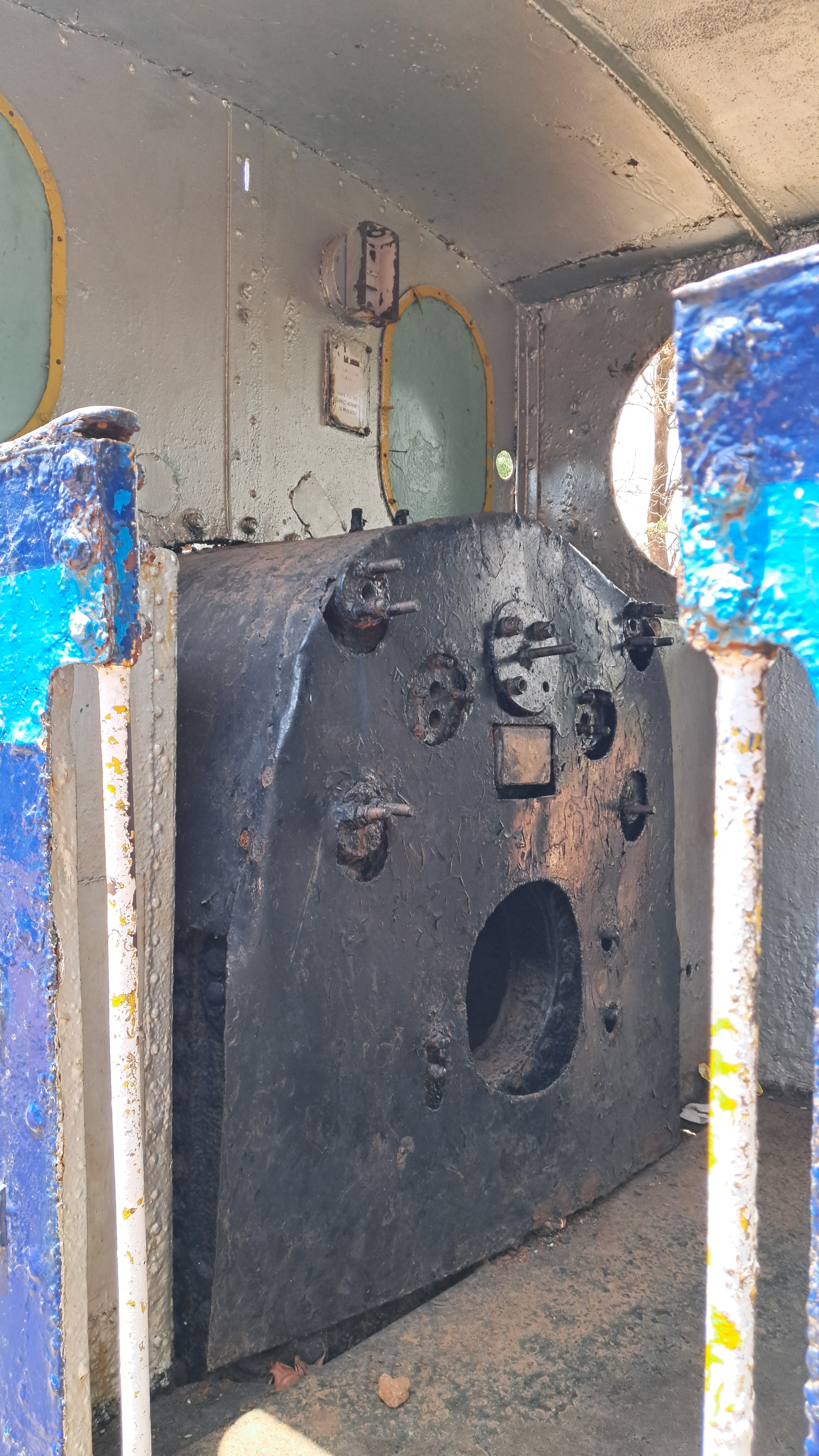
Interior of the Locomotive

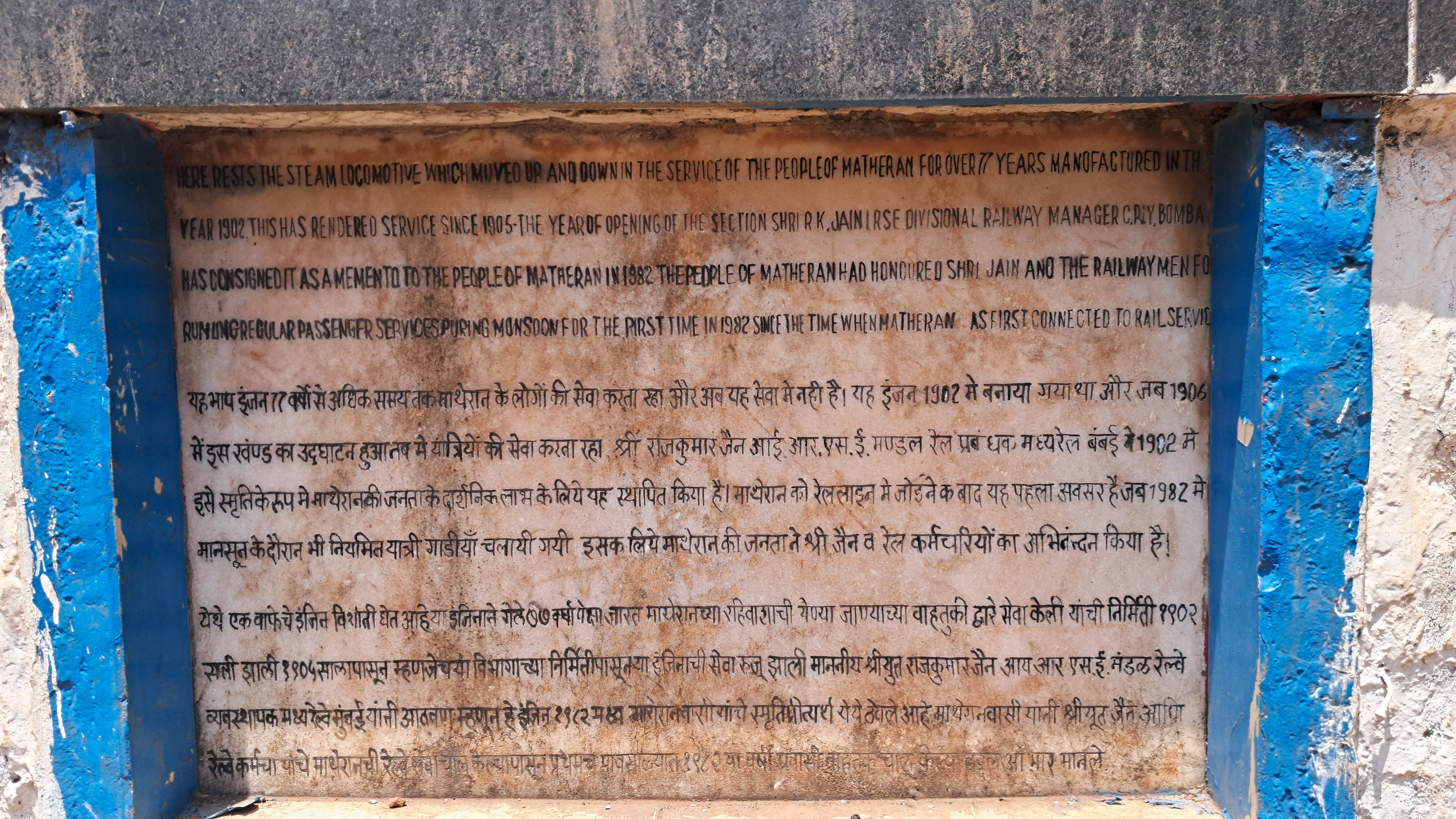
A plaque on the plinth of MLR no. 741

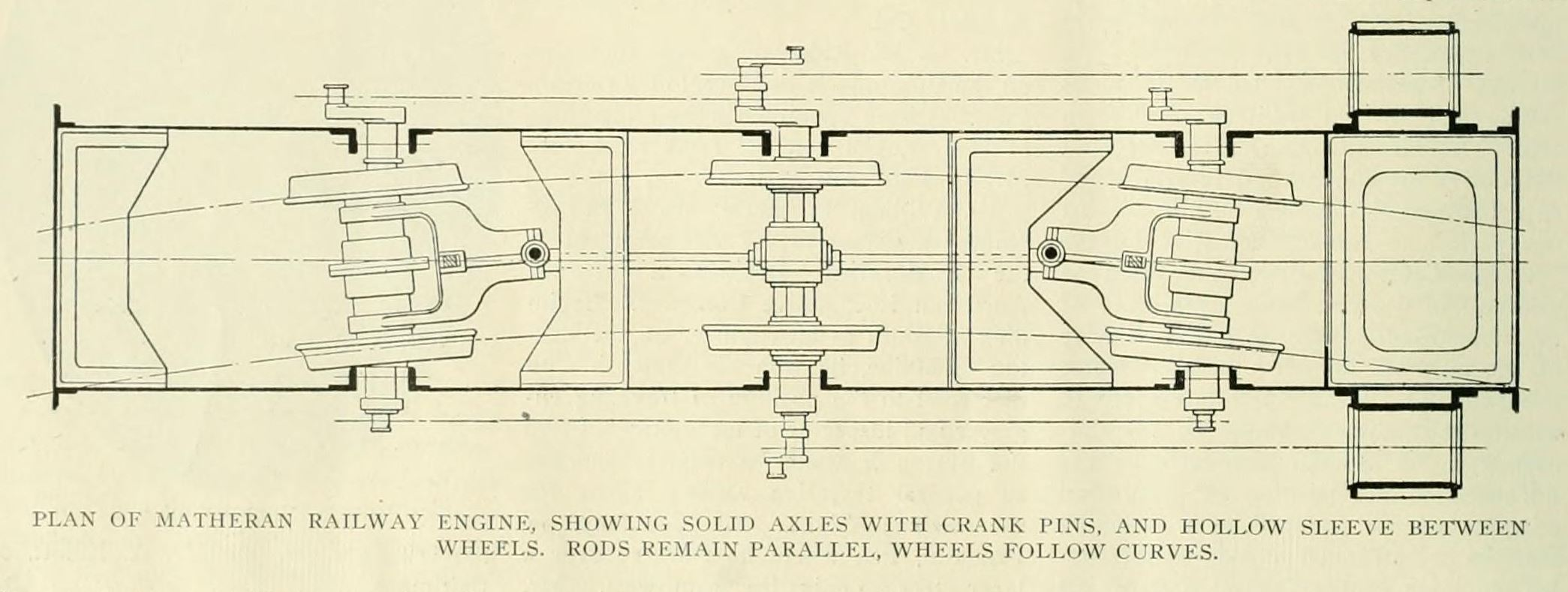
Diagram of the articulation mechanism
