= Saxon III K =

Class of 6 German 0-6-2T locomotives

III K DRG Class 99.754
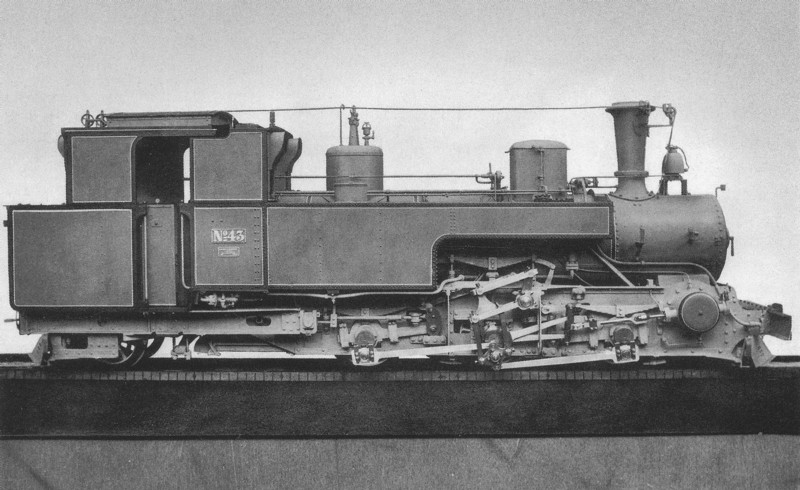
- Hartmann's works photo of No. 43 (1781 of 1891)
Type and origin
- Builder: Krauss (2); Hartmann (4)
- Build date: Krauss: 1889; Hartmann: 1891
- Total produced: 6
Specifications
- Configuration
  - Whyte: 0-6-2T
  - German: K 34.7
- Gauge: 750 mm (2 ft 5 1/2 in)
- Coupled dia.: 855 mm (2 ft 9 5/8 in)
- Length
  - Over couplers: 35–36: 8,980 mm (29 ft 5 1/2 in); 43–46: 9,000 mm (29 ft 6 1/4 in)
- Width: 1,986 mm (6 ft 6 1/4 in)
- Height: 3,000 mm (9 ft 10 1/8 in)
- Axle load: 35–36: 6.2 t (6.1 long tons; 6.8 short tons); 43–46: 6.4 t (6.3 long tons; 7.1 short tons)
- Adhesive weight: 35–36: 18.6 t (18.3 long tons; 20.5 short tons); 43–46: 19.2 t (18.9 long tons; 21.2 short tons)
- Empty weight: 35–36: 19.3 t (19.0 long tons; 21.3 short tons); 43–46: 20.4 t (20.1 long tons; 22.5 short tons)
- Service weight: 35–36: 24.7 t (24.3 long tons; 27.2 short tons); 43–46: 26.3 t (25.9 long tons; 29.0 short tons)
- Boiler
- No. of heating tubes: 97
- Heating tube length: 3,500 mm (11 ft 5 3/4 in)
- Boiler pressure: 10 kgf/cm^{2} (981 kPa; 142 lbf/in^{2})
- Heating surface
  - Firebox: 0.9 m^{2} (9.7 sq ft)
  - Radiative: 35–36: 3.8 m^{2} (41 sq ft); 43–46: 3.9 m^{2} (42 sq ft)
  - Tubes: 42.4 m^{2} (456 sq ft)
  - Evaporative: 35–36: 46.26 m^{2} (497.9 sq ft); 43–46: 46.29 m^{2} (498.3 sq ft)
- Cylinders: Two, inside
- Cylinder size: 324 mm (12 3/4 in)
- Piston stroke: 400 mm (15 3/4 in)
- Valve gear: Stephenson / Klose
- Train brakes: Heberlein brake
Performance figures
- Maximum speed: 30 km/h (19 mph)
- Indicated power: 195 PS (143 kW; 192 hp)
- Tractive effort
  - Starting: 28.93 kN (6,500 lbf)
Career
- Numbers: K.Sä.St.E.: 35–36, 43–46; DRG: 99 7541–7542, 99 7543–7546
- Retired: 1925–1926
- Disposition: All Scrapped

The Saxon III K (three K) were a class of six 0-6-2T locomotives of the Royal Saxon State Railways with a track gauge of 750 mm (2 ft 5 1/2 in). In 1925, the Deutsche Reichsbahn grouped these locomotives into their DRG Class 99.754.

== History ==
Since 1881, numerous narrow-gauge lines, some of them with many bends and inclines, had been opened in Saxony, and the volume of traffic had steadily increased. The performance of the I K initially used was soon no longer sufficient. Locomotives with Klose running gear and Klose articulated bunkers (German: Stütztender) were an alternative, as they were already supplied by Krauss in Linz to the Bosnia-Herzegovina State Railways and the Bosnabahn as BHStB class IIIa4.

The Royal Saxon State Railways therefore ordered two of these more powerful locomotives at the end of the 1880s. Delivered in the spring of 1889, they were assigned to the class Kr Kl T K. As a result, they were identified as a tank locomotive (T) from the manufacturer Krauss (Kr) with a 750 mm (2 ft 5 1/2 in) (K) and a Klose running gear (Kl). A second series of four locomotives was manufactured in 1891 by the Sächsische Maschinenfabrik in Chemnitz, which were given the classification H Kl T K. In 1896 all six locomotives were designated as K III and from 1900 as III K.

The locomotives proved their worth, but due to the complicated technology, further procurement was not made in favour of the class IV K built from 1892 onwards. The III K had an advantage over the IV K in its lower axle load. In the beginning, the IV K was simply too difficult for many routes and the economical K.Sächs.Sts.E.B. only slowly rebuilt the routes to heavier rail. It was only around 1910 that the IV K was able to oust the III K from sole train service.

At the beginning of the First World War, numerous locomotives of the classes I K and IV K were handed over to the Heeresfeldbahn, so the III K was again used on some routes alone in train service. The Heeresfeldbahn rented four locomotives in 1917 and used them in Serbia. Later, by the end of the war, however, all the locomotives had returned to Saxony. With the arrival of the first VI K and the return of the locomotives from war missions, however, the III K were no longer needed and only served as a reserve. All were taken over by the Deutsche Reichsbahn after 1920. In 1922/23 all six locomotives were placed into store. In 1925 they were allocated the new numbers 99 7541 to 99 7546, which were never applied. A little later the locomotives were withdrawn and scrapped. None of them have survived today.

In contrast, the locomotives that had been delivered by Krauss to Bosnia were still in use on the Yugoslav Railways (JŽ) as class 189 until 1967, when they were no longer needed there due to the conversion of the lines to standard gauge.

== Technical features ==
The boiler was long-boiler type made from three rings that had been riveted together. Two Friedmann type injectors were used to feed the boiler.

The locomotives had two cylinders between the frames with external Stephenson valve gear, which drove the middle coupled axle. The power transmission to the radially adjustable coupled axles was carried out using length-adjustable coupling rods of the Klose type. The radial adjustment of the first and third coupled axles and the control of the lever parallelogram on the coupling rods was carried out according to the swing-out radius of the articulated bunker using a lever linkage.

The locomotive was braked using a counterweight brake, supplemented by a counter-steam brake. The locomotives had the reel for the Heberlein brake as a train brake.

The water supply was housed in side tanks, the coal in a bunker behind the driver's cab.

== Service ==
The III K had a long association with the narrow-gauge Wolkenstein–Jöhstadt railway line (the Preßnitztalbahn) in the Ore Mountains. In 1892, three of the Hartmann-built locomotives (Nos. 43, 45, 46) went there almost brand new. With an interruption in World War I, the locomotives were used there in train service until 1922/23.

Two more locomotives were used from 1891 on the Heidenau–Kurort Altenberg railway (Müglitztalbahn) from Mügeln to Geising-Altenberg. With the commissioning of the more powerful IV K, the two locomotives were moved to Mügeln (near Oschatz) in 1896.

Class III K locomotives were also temporarily used on the Cranzahl–Oberwiesenthal, Mosel–Ortmannsdorf, Grünstädtel–Oberrittersgrün, Hetzdorf–Eppendorf lines and on the Thumer network .
