= Klien-Lindner axle =

Driving axle for steam locomotives

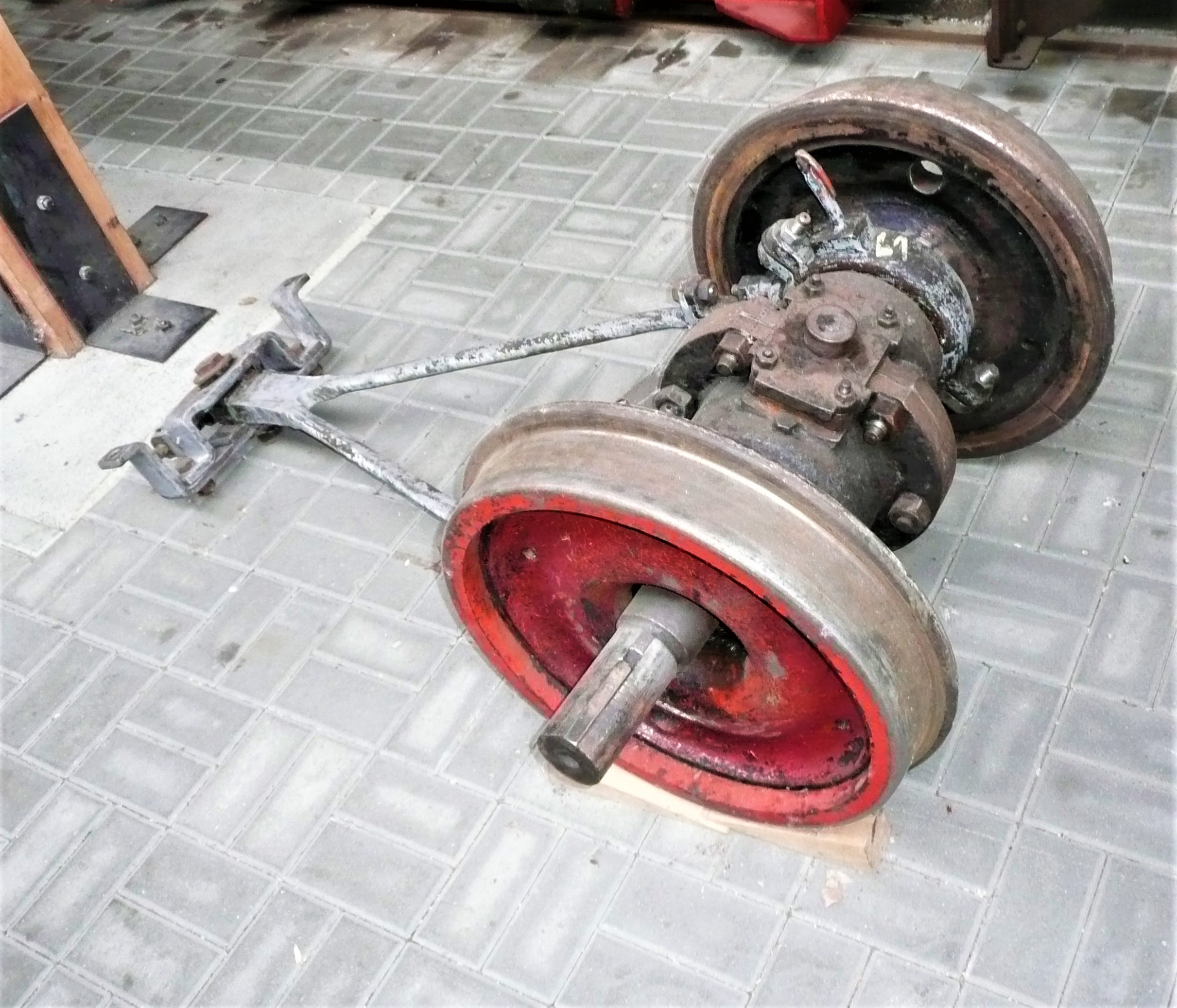
A Klien-Lindner axle

The Klien-Lindner axle (German: Klien-Lindner-Hohlachse) is a special type of hollow driving axle on steam locomotives that enable better curve running due to its ability to slide transversely. It was developed by the German engineers, Ewald Klien and Heinrich Lindner, of the Royal Saxon State Railways (Königlich Sächsische Staatseisenbahnen).

== Design features ==
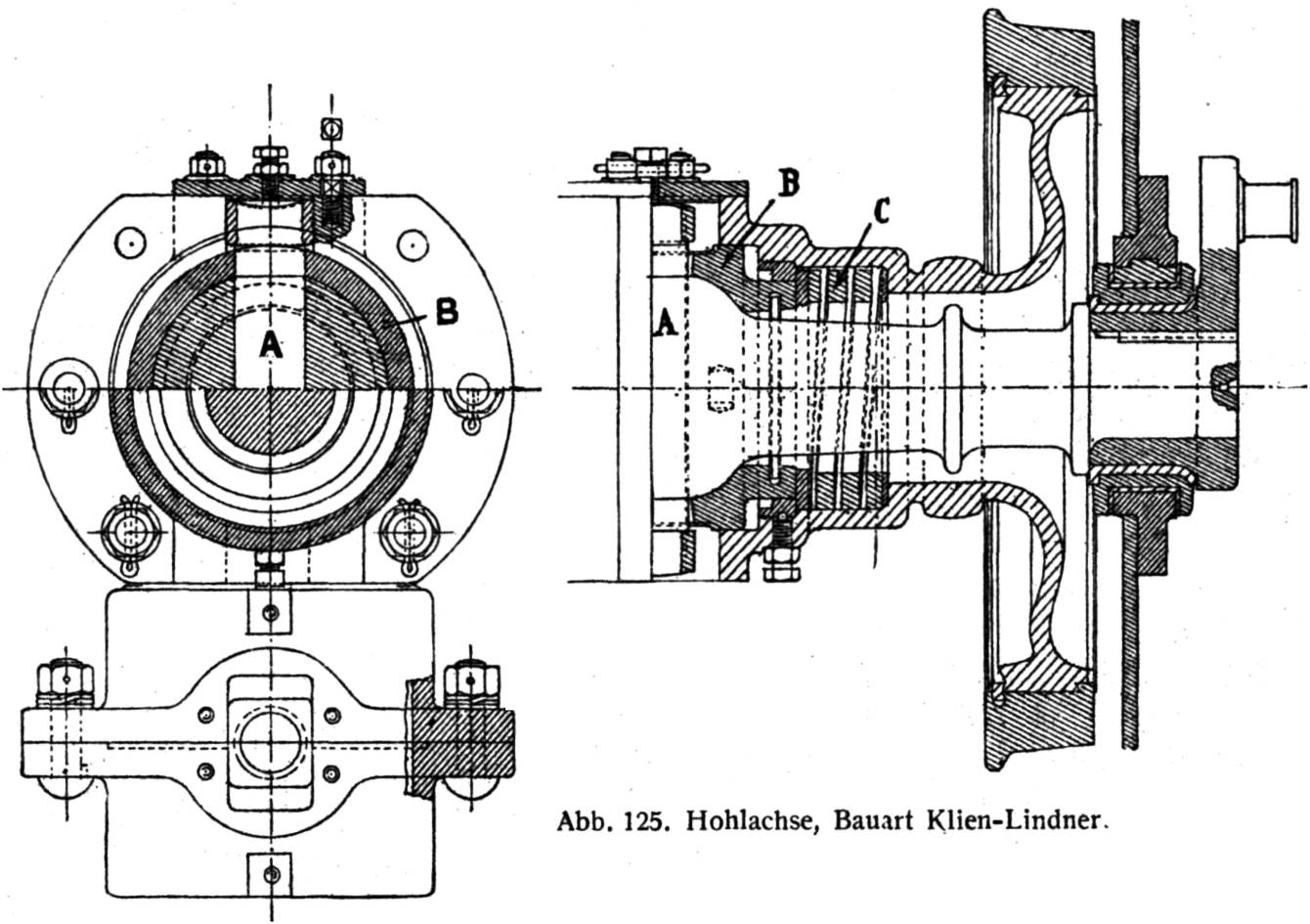
Diagram of a Klien-Lindner axle

The Klien-Lindner axle uses a double, or hollow, axle, one inside the other. It has a hollow axle (Hohlachse) on the outside, connected at its centre by a Cardan joint to a fixed driving axle running through it. The Cardan joint comprises two spherical elements that are interlinked - a solid one on the fixed axle and a hollow one on the outer hollow axle, each oriented at 90° to the other that transfer the driving forces from the rigid axle to the hollow one. The hollow spheroid acts as a sort of link motion. In this way the hollow axle can be turned by the fixed axle. In addition, the connecting link is shaped so that the axles can slide relative to one another, parallel to their axes, to a small extent. The degree to which the hollow axle can swivel is set by the outer diameter of the fixed axle and the internal diameter of the hollow one.

This system is used on steam locomotives with fixed outer frames and coupled axles. Typically the conventionally driven wheels are in the centre and there are outer Klien-Lindner axles, front and rear. In this way the wheels, which are fixed to the hollow axles, are 'steered' by shafts that pivot on the frame when the locomotive is curve running. Coupling rods from the conventional driving wheels in the centre act on drive cranks on the inner axles fixed to the frame.

In spite of their relatively simple design Klien-Lindner axles were not widely used. Derailments were common when they were used as leading axles. The axles often caused uneven, jerky running as a result of the resistance forces that arise from this type of Cardan joint, and they were expensive to maintain, something which was not offset by the reduced wear and tear on wheel flanges and rails.

== Examples ==
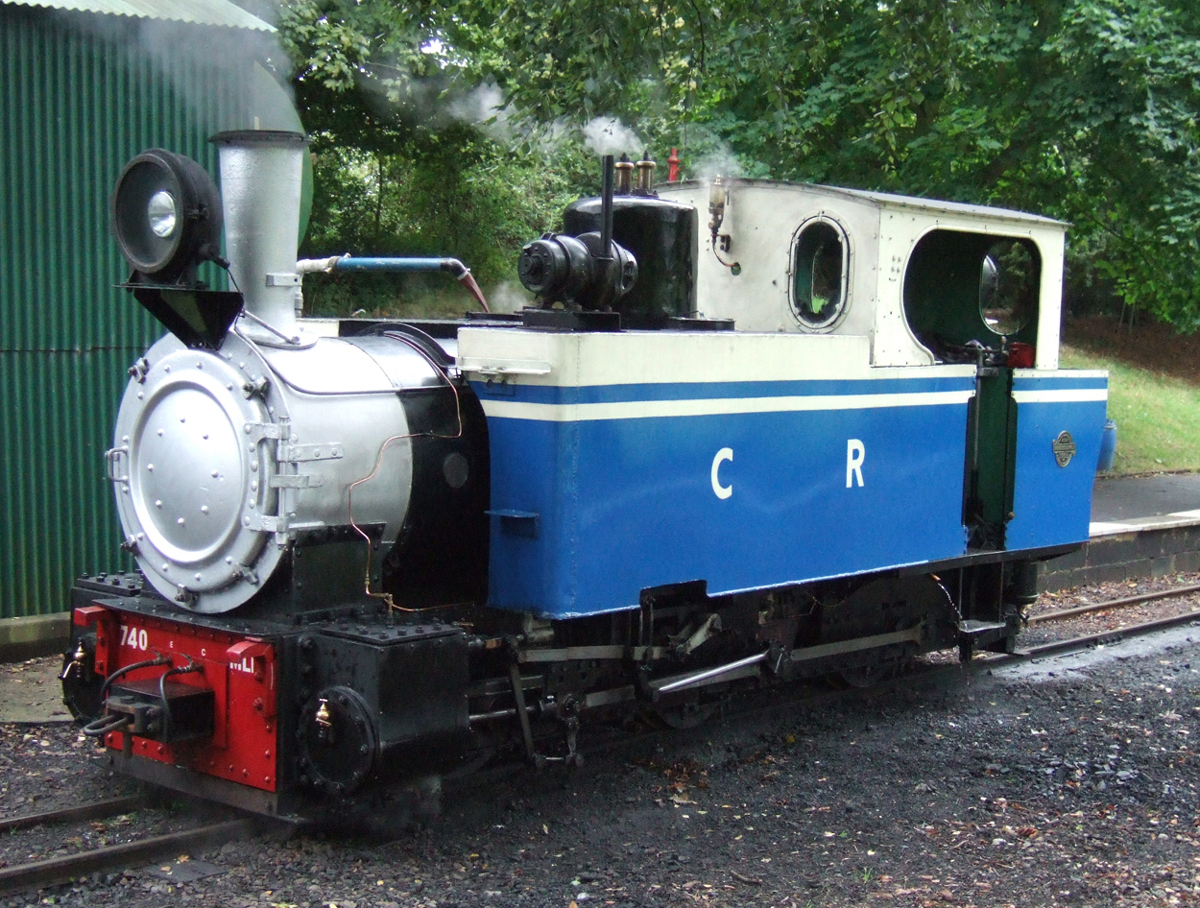
O&K MLR Locomotive No. 740 seen here on shed at Pages Park station of the Leighton Buzzard Narrow Gauge Railway

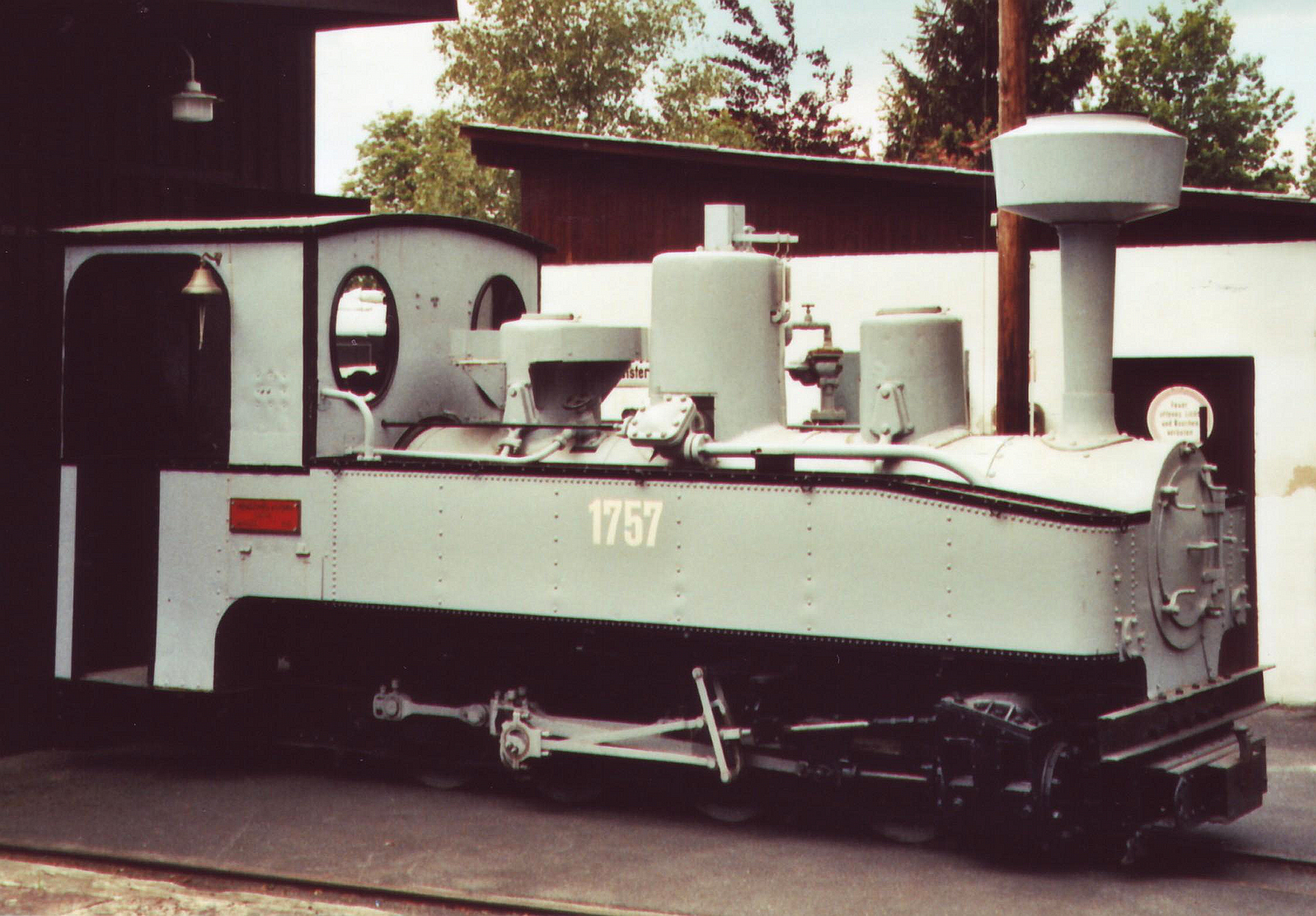
A 0-8-0T Brigadelok preserved at Deutsches Dampflokomotiv-Museum.

Several locomotives of this type were ordered for the Matheran Hill Railway in India, which has curves as sharp as 18.25 m (59.88 ft), traversed at a speed of 8 km/h (5 mph). Consulting engineer Everard Calthrop designed a 0-6-0T with Klien-Lindner articulated coupled axles to provide a flexible wheelbase, and four were supplied by Orenstein & Koppel. Steam locomotives with Klien-Lindner axle are still widely used for narrow gauge sugarcane railway in Java, Indonesia.

Locomotives with Klien-Lindner hollow axles (selection):

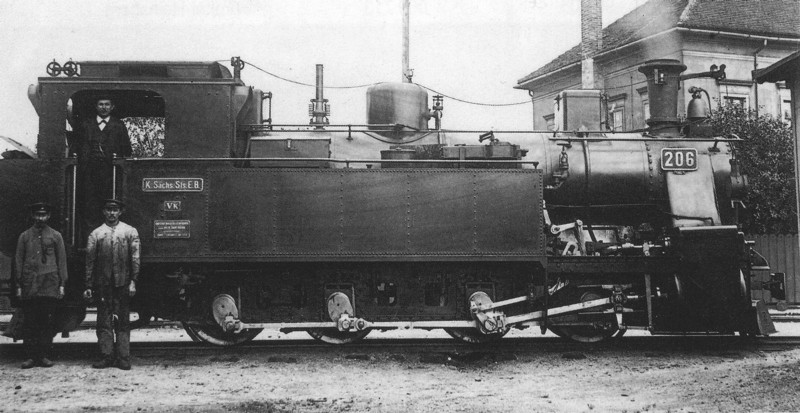
Saxon V K

- BBÖ Kh
- DR Class 99.331 (Brigadelok)
- HF 210 E, a military field locomotive
- MLR Class ML, 0-6-0T used on the Matheran Hill Railway.
- Prussian T 37
- Nos. 1 to 3 of the Rosenberg–Korytnica branch line
- Saxon I K (some)
- Saxon V K
- Saxon XV HTV
- Saxon IX V
- GLÜCKAUF and TRUSETAL of the Trusebahn

== Literature ==
- Deutsches Reichspatent DRP 27.892 und 68.932, 1893
- Lionel Wiener: Articulated Locomotives Kalmbach Publishing Co., Waukesha 1970

== See also ==
- Heywood radiating axle locomotives
- Klose-Lenkwerk
- Minimum railway curve radius
- Trench railways
- Welshpool and Llanfair Light Railway steam locomotive number 19
