= Heberlein brake =

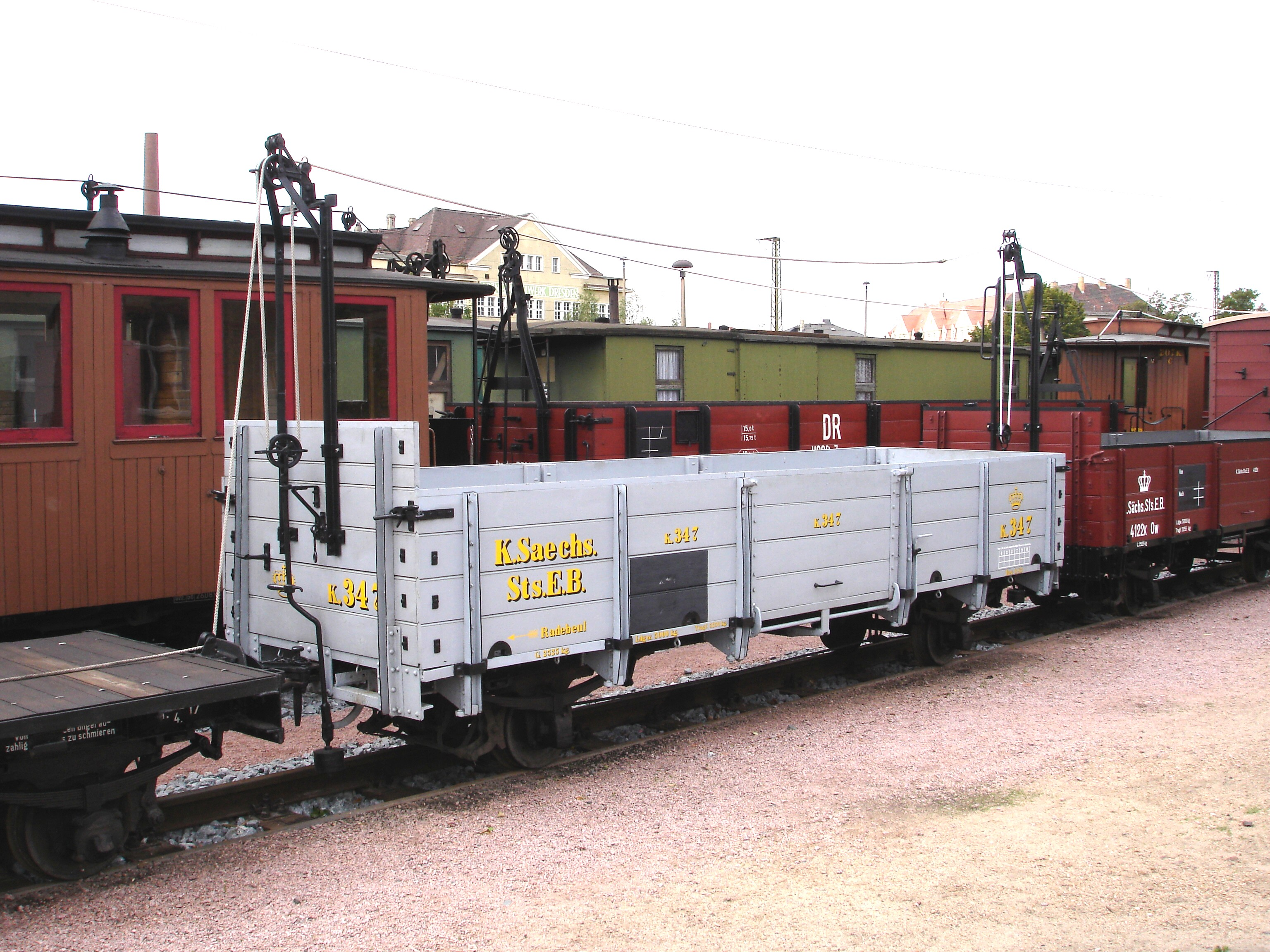
Open wagon with Heberlein brake on the Lößnitzgrundbahn

A Heberlein brake is a continuous railway brake used in Germany that is applied by means of a mechanical cable. Train braking is therefore initiated centrally from the locomotive using a winder. This causes the brake clips to be applied on individual wagons, assisted by a servo system which makes use of the rotation of the axle. The brakes operate automatically if the cable snaps. A typical feature of Heberlein brakes is the clearly visible cable run on top of the wagons, but cables can also be led underneath the wagons, as on the Spreewaldbahn railway line. Heberlein brakes were eventually largely replaced by compressed-air brakes or, sometimes, by vacuum brakes on narrow gauge railway vehicles.

== Modern use ==
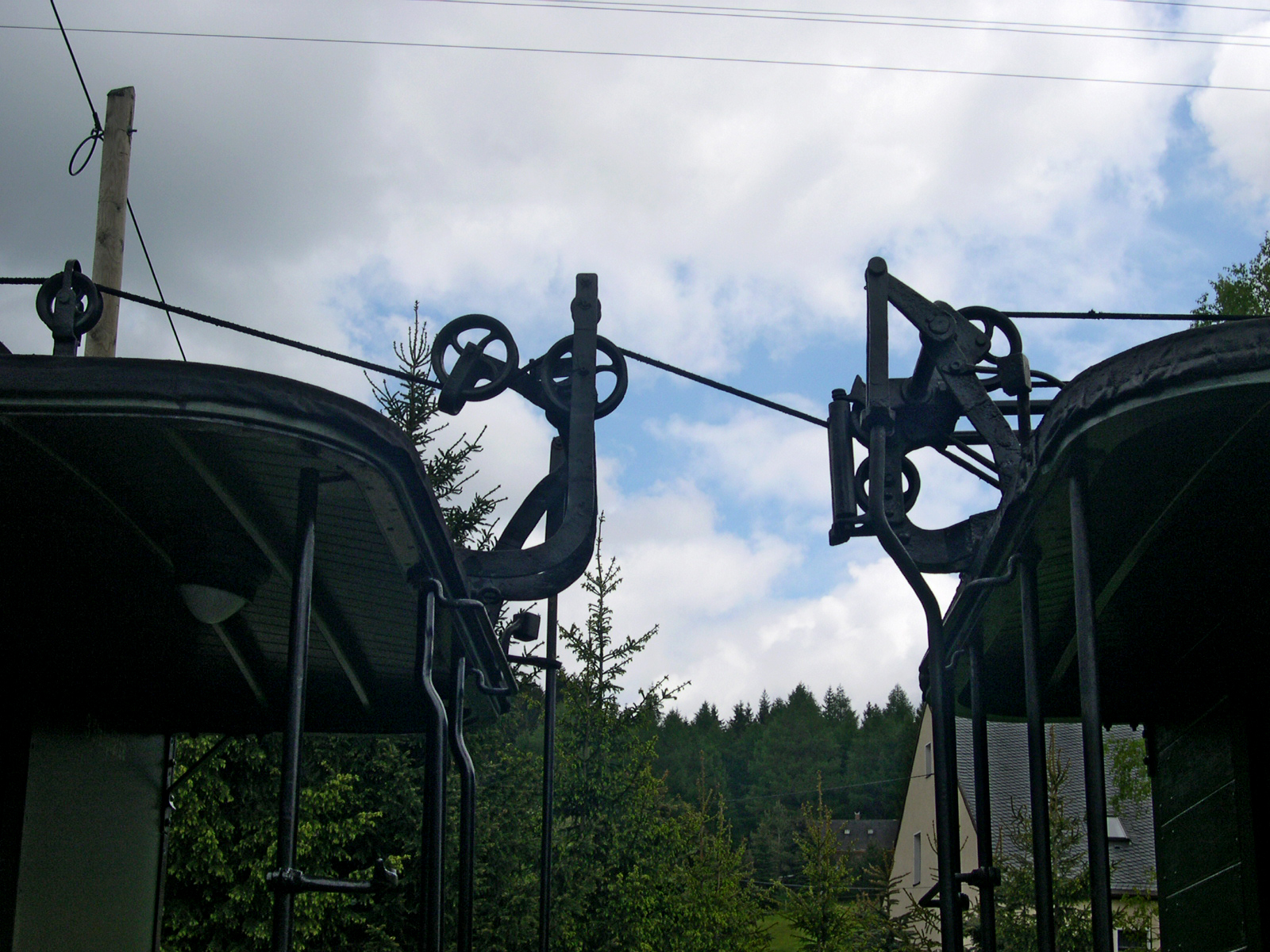
Roof equipment (with pulleys) for Heberlein brakes on wagons of a Saxon narrow gauge railway, in this case the Preßnitztalbahn

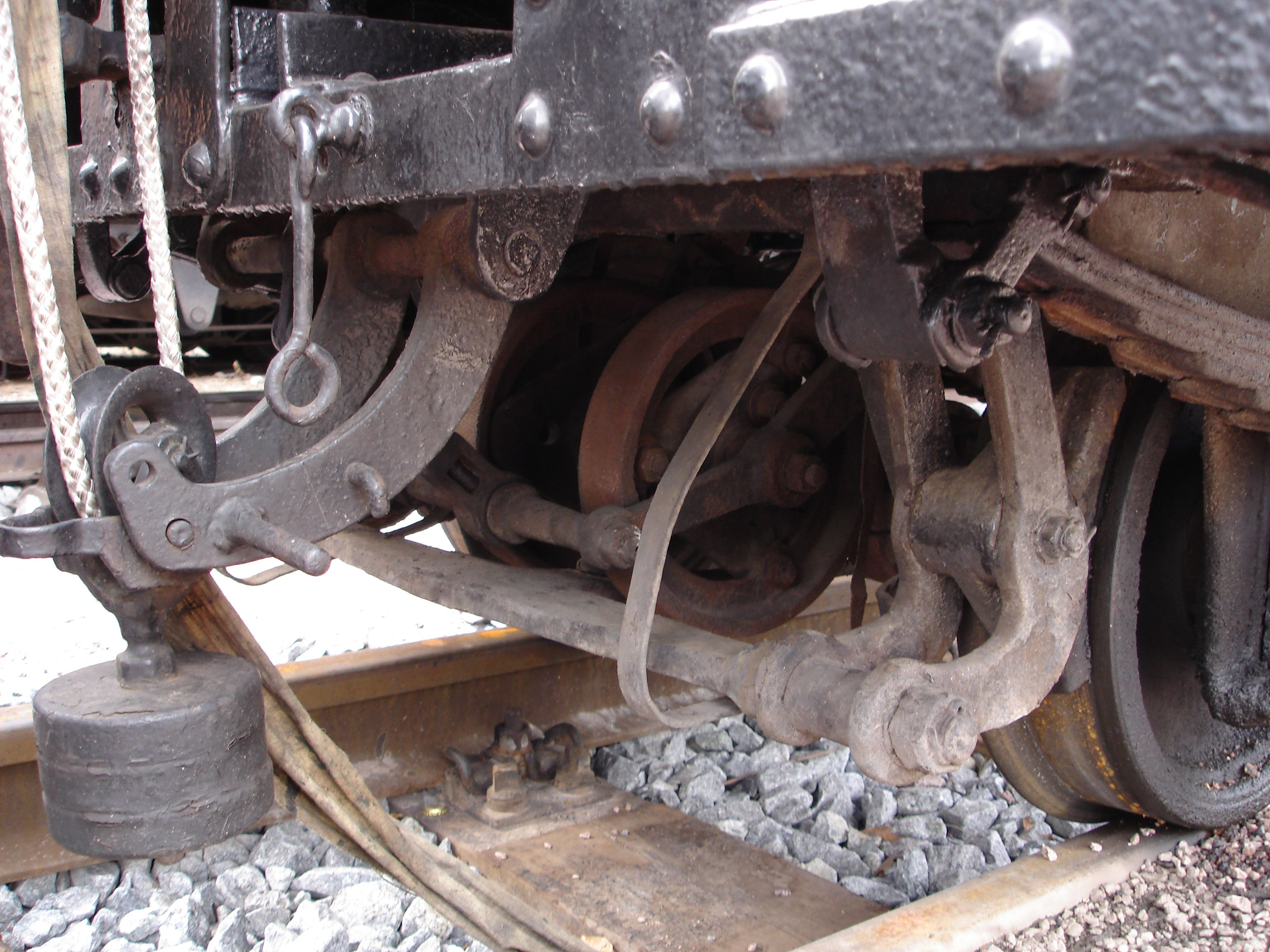
Actuating lever, and counterweight

The Heberlein brake is still permitted as an operating brake on German railways due to it being both continuous and automatic, and at the low speeds on narrow gauge lines this means it is perfectly safe.

On several narrow gauge railways in Saxony, numerous vehicles with Heberlein systems can still be seen. These include the Lößnitzgrundbahn, Weißeritztalbahn and Rittersgrün narrow gauge museum railway. On the Preßnitztalbahn trains using Heberlein brakes run regularly, several times a year.

== Operation ==
Because of the way they operate, there is a longer delay with Heberlein brakes before the brakes take effect when compared with compressed-air or vacuum brakes. As a result, locomotive and train crews have to be given appropriate training and experience when using this type of brake in practice.

== Similar brakes ==
=== Germany ===
The Görlitz counterweight brake (Görlitzer Gewichtsbremse), a form of cable brake, operates in a similar way to the Heberlein brake, but differs markedly in its design details, as does the Schmid continuous spiral-toothed gear brake.

=== Great Britain ===
The chain brake, an early British railway brake, was similar to the Heberlein brake but used a chain, instead of a cable. An example was the Clark and Webb Chain Brake, developed by John Clark in the 1840s and improved upon by Francis William Webb in 1875. It was used by the London and North Western Railway from 1877, with some remaining in service into the 1890s. Early versions were non-automatic and would not stop the train if a coupling broke, thus not fulfilling their promise of eliminating the need for a brake van and guard.

=== United States ===
The American chain brake, formally known as the "graduating car brake", was independently invented by Lucious Stebbins of Hartford, Connecticut in 1848, and by William Loughridge of Weverton, Maryland in 1855. Loughridge's design (sometimes known as the "Loughridge brake") would be in use by 1857 by the lines of Cincinnati, Hamilton and Dayton Railway (1846–1917) and Mad River and Lake Erie Railroad, while there are no records of adoption of Stebbins' design. In 1859, the Pennsylvania Railroad's (PRR's) adoption of Loughridge's brake would be publicized as making it the safest route possible, boosting sales for both Loughridge and the PRR. The PRR would continue using the brake into the 1870s, despite more uniform brakes being developed.
