= Saxon VIII V2 =

VIII V_{2} DRG Class 36.9-10
Manufacturer:	Sächsische Maschinenfabrik (Chemnitz); Schwartzkopff (Berlin); Maschinenfabrik Esslingen; Linke-Hofmann (Breslau)		
Numbers:	519–538; 36 901–919	539–568; 36 921–948	569–636; 36 951–1014
Years of manufacture:	1896/97	1897–1899	1900–1902
Retired:	to 1931		
Quantity:	20	30	68
Axle arrangement:	2'B n2v		
Gauge:	1,435 mm (4 ft 8 1/2 in) standard gauge		
Length over buffers:	16,790 mm (55 ft 1 in)		
Empty weight:	44.7 t 44.0 long tons; 49.3 short tons	45.5 t 44.8 long tons; 50.2 short tons	49.0 t 48.2 long tons; 54.0 short tons
Adhesive weight:	29.1 t 28.6 long tons; 32.1 short tons	30.2 t 29.7 long tons; 33.3 short tons	32.0 t 31.5 long tons; 35.3 short tonst
Service weight:	49.5 t 48.7 long tons; 54.6 short tons	51.6 t 50.8 long tons; 56.9 short tons	54.5 t 53.6 long tons; 60.1 short tons
Axle weight:	14.5 t 14.3 long tons; 16.0 short tons	15.1 t 14.9 long tons; 16.6 short tons	16.0 t 15.7 long tons; 17.6 short tons
Top speed:	80 km/h (50 mph)		
Indicated power:	N/K		
Driving wheel diameter:	1,590 mm (62.60 in)		
Trailing wheel diameter:	1,065 mm (41.93 in)		
Valve gear:	Walschaerts		
High-pressure cylinder diameter:	440 mm (17.323 in)	460 mm (18.110 in)	460 mm (18.110 in)
Low-pressure cylinder diameter:	650 mm (25.591 in)	680 mm (26.772 in)	680 mm (26.772 in)
Piston stroke:	600 mm (23.622 in)		
Boiler overpressure:	12 bar (1,200 kPa; 170 psi)	12 bar (1,200 kPa; 170 psi)	13 bar (1,300 kPa; 190 psi)
No. of heating tubes:	216	216	254
Heating tube length:	3,800 mm (150 in)		
Grate area:	1.87 m^{2} (20.1 sq ft)		
Radiative heating area:	13.4 m^{2} (144 sq ft)	13.4 m^{2} (144 sq ft)	15.6 m^{2} (168 sq ft)
Tube heating area:	103.1 m^{2} (1,110 sq ft)	103.1 m^{2} (1,110 sq ft)	121.3 m^{2} (1,306 sq ft)
Evaporative heating area:	112.1 m^{2} (1,207 sq ft)	112.1 m^{2} (1,207 sq ft)	130.77 m^{2} (1,407.6 sq ft)
Tender:	sä 3 T 9	sä 2'2' T 16	sä 2'2' T 21
Brake:	Westinghouse compressed-air brake		

The Saxon Class VIII $\textstyle \mathfrak{V}$_{2} was a twin-coupled tender locomotive procured for passenger services by the Royal Saxon State Railways. In 1925, the Deutsche Reichsbahn grouped these engines into their Class 36.9-10.

== History ==
The design of the locomotives was derived from the Class VIII V_{1} express engines. As passenger locomotives the VIII V_{2} were given smaller coupled wheelsets, however. To distinguish them from the express engines, the new machines were give annotated with the subscript "2".

Between 1896 and 1902 118 locomotives were placed in service by the Royal Saxon State Railways. As well as their in-house suppliers, the Sächsische Maschinenfabrik in Chemnitz, Schwartzkopff in Berlin, Maschinenfabrik Esslingen and Linke-Hofmann in Breslau were involved in their manufacture.

During the First World War, No. 528 from the first construction series was lost. The engine was later operated by the Polish state railway PKP as No. Od101-1.

In 1920, the rest of the locomotives were transferred to the newly founded Deutsche Reichsbahn, who retired several examples in the early 1920s. For example, in 1925 the 111 remaining locomotives were given the new running numbers 36 901–919, 36 921–948 and 36 951–1014. With the increasing appearance of modern superheated locomotives like the Saxon XII H2, the XIV HT and the introduction of Prussian classes into Saxony these locomotives soon ended up carrying out secondary duties. The locomotives were all retired by 1931 and scrapped. Not a single example has survived.

== Duties ==
The locomotives preferred use was in the haulage of passenger trains on the railway lines running up into the Ore Mountains. They were also used, however, on express trains. Their smaller driving wheels gave the locomotives good acceleration and their top speed of 80 km/h was sufficient for express trains in the highlands. The locomotives were mainly operated on the lines from Chemnitz to Riesa, Annaberg and Aue, from Dresden to Görlitz and Zittau and on the Dresden to Leipzig line.

In the early 1920s, they also had to haul heavy excursion trains of up to 50 axles from Dresden into Saxon Switzerland. Finally, the engines were used for commuter services around Dresden and there are even records of them being used to haul Leig trains.

== Technical details ==
The boiler had a Belpaire firebox, typical of Saxon locomotives, and was located between the frame plates in the area of the firebox. The boiler was fed by two feedwater pumps made by Schäfer & Buddenberg.

The locomotive had a two-cylinder compound engine with a Walschaerts valve gear and Lindner starting system (Anfahrvorrichtung). The engine drove the first coupled axle. The front twin-axled bogie had an axle base of 2,150 mm and side play of 39 mm.

The brake was a Westinghouse compressed air brake. It acted on both sides of the coupled wheelsets. The running wheels in the bogie were unbraked.

The locomotives were coupled to tenders of Saxon Class sä 3 T 9, sä 2'2' T 16 and 2'2' T 21.
