= Saxon XVIII H =

Saxon XVIII H DRG Class 18.0
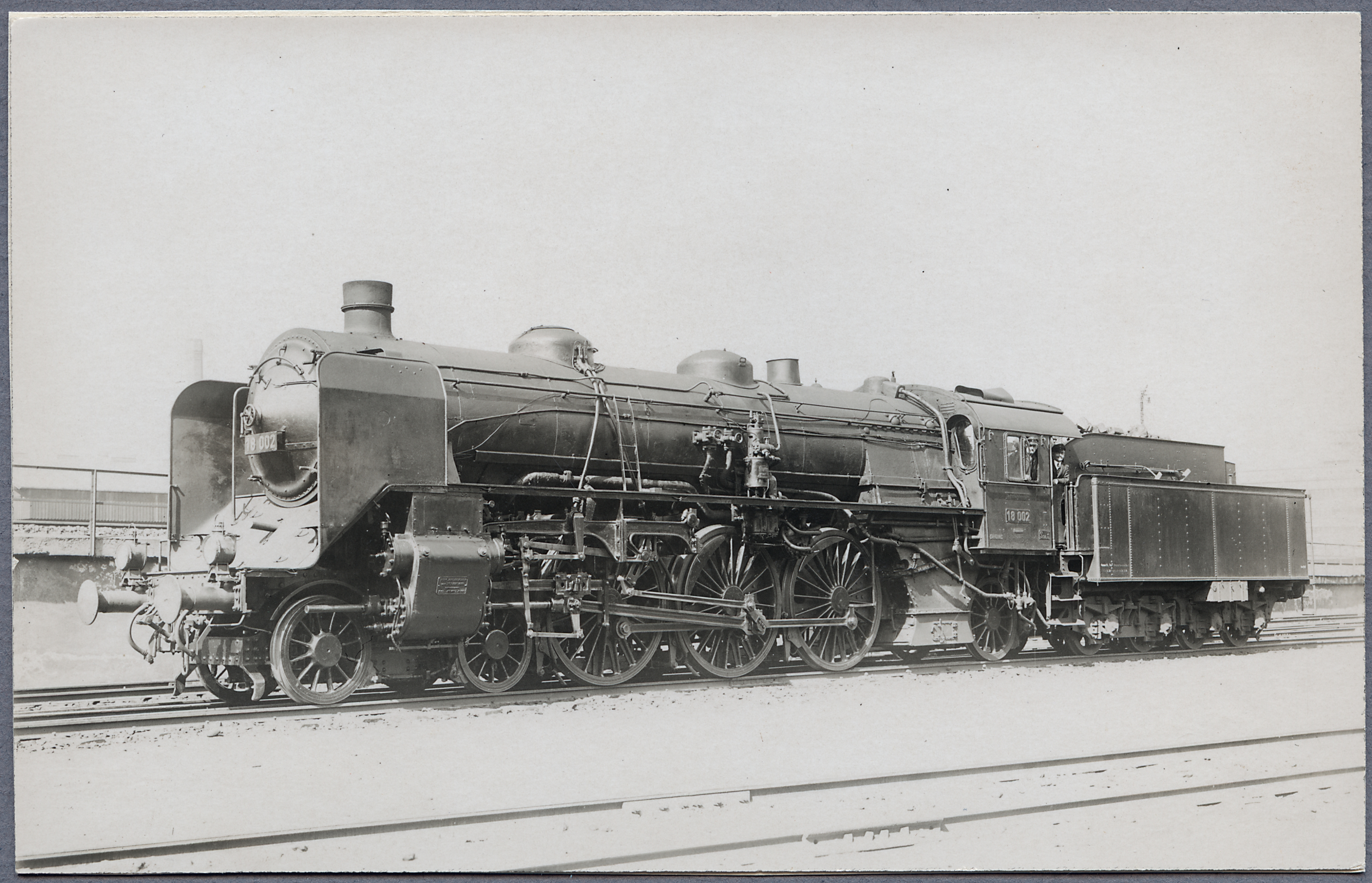
Type and origin
- Builder: Sächsische Maschinenfabrik, Chemnitz
- Build date: 1917/18
- Total produced: 10
Specifications
- Configuration
  - Whyte: 4-6-2
  - UIC: 2′C1′ h3
- Gauge: 1,435 mm (4 ft 8 1/2 in)
- Leading dia.: 1,065 mm (3 ft 5 7/8 in)
- Driver dia.: 1,905 mm (6 ft 3 in)
- Trailing dia.: 1,260 mm (4 ft 1 5/8 in)
- Wheelbase
  - Overall: 11,375 mm (37 ft 3 3/4 in)
  - incl. tender: 18,597 mm (61 ft 1/4 in)
- Length: 22,150 mm (72 ft 8 in)
- Height: 4,550 mm (14 ft 11 1/8 in)
- Axle load: 16.9 tonnes (16.6 long tons; 18.6 short tons)
- Adhesive weight: 50.7 tonnes (49.9 long tons; 55.9 short tons)
- Empty weight: 84.4 tonnes (83.1 long tons; 93.0 short tons)
- Service weight: 93.5 tonnes (92.0 long tons; 103.1 short tons)
- Boiler
- No. of heating tubes: 156
- Boiler pressure: 14 kg/cm^{2} (1.37 MPa; 199 psi)
- Heating surface
  - Firebox: 4.52 m^{2} (48.7 sq ft)
  - Radiative: 15.6 m^{2} (168 sq ft)
  - Tubes: 200.6 m^{2} (2,159 sq ft)
  - Evaporative: 215.76 m^{2} (2,322.4 sq ft)
- Superheater
  - Heating area: 72.00 m^{2} (775.0 sq ft)
- Cylinders: 3
- Cylinder size: 500 mm (19 11/16 in)
- Piston stroke: 630 mm (24 13/16 in)
- Valve gear: Walschaerts (Heusinger)
- Loco brake: Westinghouse compressed-air brake
Performance figures
- Maximum speed: 120 km/h (75 mph)
- Indicated power: 1,700 PS (1,250 kW; 1,680 hp)
Career
- Numbers: K.Sä.St.E.: 196–205; DRG: 18 001–010
- Retired: 1965

The Saxon Class XVIII $\textstyle \mathfrak{H}$ was a German six-coupled tender locomotive built for the Royal Saxon State Railways (Königlich Sächsische Staatseisenbahnen) in 1917/18 for express train services. The Deutsche Reichsbahn grouped them in 1925 into DRG Class 18.0.

== History ==
After a number of four-cylinder compounds had been taken into service in Saxony, the Saxon XVIII H appeared with a three-cylinder engine based on a Prussian prototype. In 1917 and 1918 the Sächsische Maschinenfabrik in Chemnitz built ten examples of this class.

The newly formed Deutsche Reichsbahn took all 10 locomotives in 1925 over and gave them the numbers 18 001–010.

Locomotive 18 002 was destroyed in the Second World War; the remaining engines went into the Deutsche Reichsbahn in East Germany after the war had ended. They were station at Dresden-Altstadt locomotive depot and were later retired between 1963 and 1965.

== Design features ==
To begin with the Class XIII H had a boiler with a firebox located above the frame. This was made from three boiler rings, the third one being slightly conical in shape. The boiler feedwater was supplied through two steam injectors and a Knorr feedwater pump with preheater. The second injector was later omitted.

The steam engine was configured as a three-cylinder system with simple steam expansion. Two cylinders were located in the usual horizontal position on the outside, the third cylinder was built between the frame sides at an angle. All three cylinders drove the second coupled axle. The gearing of the inside cylinder was operated from the Heusinger valve gear of the outside cylinders via levers and intermediate shafts.

The three coupled axles were fixed in the frame. The leading bogie had a side play of 38 mm, the trailing Adams axle could swing 60 mm to the side.

The locomotive brake was a Westinghouse compressed-air brake. Braking worked on one side of all the carrying and coupled wheels. Some of the locomotives were later equipped with Indusi train protection.

The locomotives were coupled to Saxon sä 2'2' T 31 tenders.

== Service ==
Because the trains on the Central Mountain routes were largely hauled by the powerful successor class, the Saxon XX HV (DRG Class 19.0), the Saxon XVIII Hs were mainly deployed on less hilly lines of Dresden–Leipzig and Dresden–Berlin. After the Second World War the nine remaining engines were concentrated in Dresden and were mostly used to haul express services to Berlin.

== See also ==
- List of Saxon locomotives and railbuses
- Royal Saxon State Railways
