= Saxon XX HV =

Saxon XX HV DRG Class 19.0
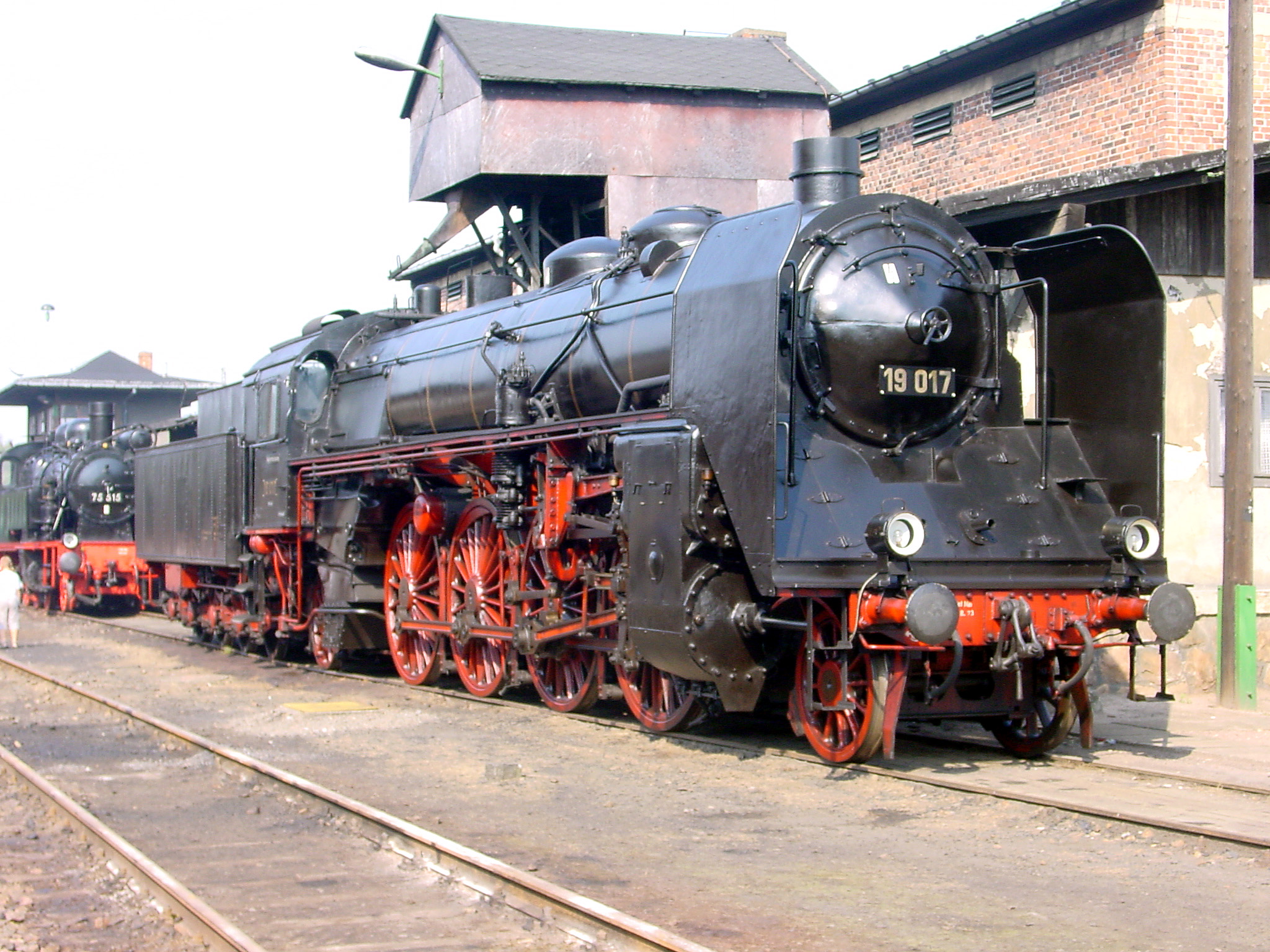
- Locomotive 19 017 in Eisenbahnmuseum Chemnitz-Hilbersdorf, 24 August 2002
Type and origin
- Builder: Sächsische Maschinenfabrik, Chemnitz
- Build date: 1918–1923
- Total produced: 23
Specifications
- Configuration
  - Whyte: 2-8-2
  - UIC: 1′D1′ h4vS
  - German: S 46.17
- Gauge: 1,435 mm (4 ft 8 1/2 in)
- Leading dia.: 1,065 mm (3 ft 5 7/8 in)
- Driver dia.: 1,905 mm (6 ft 3 in)
- Trailing dia.: 1,260 mm (4 ft 1 5/8 in)
- Wheelbase
  - Overall: 11,960 mm (39 ft 2 3/4 in)
  - incl. tender: 19,182 mm (62 ft 11 1/4 in)
- Length
  - Over beams: 22,632 mm (74 ft 3 in)
- Axle load: 17.2 tonnes (16.9 long tons; 19.0 short tons)
- Adhesive weight: 50.7 tonnes (49.9 long tons; 55.9 short tons)
- Empty weight: 90.3 tonnes (88.9 long tons; 99.5 short tons)
- Service weight: 93.5 tonnes (92.0 long tons; 103.1 short tons)
- Tender type: sä 2'2' T 31
- Fuel capacity: coal
- Water cap.: 31.5 m^{3} (6,900 imp gal)
- Boiler
- No. of heating tubes: 156
- Heating tube length: 5,800 mm (19 ft 1/4 in)
- Boiler pressure: 15 kg/cm^{2} (1.47 MPa; 213 psi)
- Heating surface
  - Firebox: 4.50 m^{2} (48.4 sq ft)
  - Radiative: 15.5 m^{2} (167 sq ft)
  - Tubes: 211.6 m^{2} (2,278 sq ft)
  - Evaporative: 227.05 m^{2} (2,443.9 sq ft)
- Superheater
  - Heating area: 74.00 m^{2} (796.5 sq ft)
- High-pressure cylinder: 720 mm (28 3/8 in)
- Low-pressure cylinder: 480 mm (18 7/8 in)
- Piston stroke: 630 mm (24 13/16 in)
- Valve gear: Walschaerts (Heusinger)
Performance figures
- Maximum speed: 100 km/h (62 mph) / 120 km/h (75 mph)
- Indicated power: 1,800 PS (1,320 kW; 1,780 hp)
Career
- Numbers: Sä.St.E.: 66–80, 206–213; DRG: 19 001–023
- Retired: by 1967

The Saxon Class XX HV were German eight-coupled express train, tender locomotives built for the Royal Saxon State Railways (Königlich Sächsische Staatseisenbahnen) just after the First World War. The locomotives, which became known as the 'Pride of Saxony' (Sachsenstolz) were the first and only German express locomotives with a 2-8-2 wheel arrangement and, at the time of their appearance, were the largest express engines in the whole of Europe. In 1925, the Deutsche Reichsbahn grouped these locomotive into their DRG Class 19.0.

== History ==
The XX HVs were the last Saxon express train locomotives and were the pinnacle of Saxon locomotive engineering. They were conceived primarily for heavy express train duties on the winding and hilly Dresden to Hof trunk route through the Mittelgebirge.

Its design was related to the simultaneously developed 4-6-2 express locomotive Saxon XVIII H, but unlike the latter, it had a fourth coupled axle and a four-cylinder compound engine. Between 1918 and 1925 a total of 23 examples were manufactured by the Sächsische Maschinenfabrik in Chemnitz.

The locomotives were given new running numbers 19 001–023 by the Deutsche Reichsbahn-Gesellschaft in 1925. The engines built in 1922 were stationed initially in Stuttgart-Rosenstein, those built in 1923 at Frankfurt am Main. From 1925 all 23 locomotives were homed in the Saxon locomotive depots (Bahnbetriebswerken or Bw) of Dresden-Altstadt and Reichenbach/Vogtl.

The engines fully met the requirements of a Mittelgebirge mountain locomotive, however its main disadvantage was its high coal consumption on the level. As a result, the XX HV only worked the Dresden–Berlin line by exception.

Locomotive 19 021 was destroyed in the Second World War by a bomb, the remainder went into the Deutsche Reichsbahn in East Germany in 1945, but several were not used due to war damage. Until their retirement in the 1960s the locomotives continued to head express trains on the Dresden–Hof and Leipzig–Hof routes.

On the electrification of their main routes the locomotives were retired by 1967. Number 19 017 remains preserved as a non-operational museum locomotive at the Dresden Transport Museum.

== Design features ==
The boiler was the largest of a German steam engine at the time the XX HV was brought into service and had exceptionally long heating tubes of 5.8 m in length. The grate was of almost square shape and had to be arranged above the frame due to its size. The boiler was used in the Saxon XVIII H as well, with only minor adjustments to decrease its weight which resulted in a heating area that was smaller by 10 m^{2}. The boiler was supplied with water through two feedwater pumps that were later replaced by one injector and a Knorr feed pump with preheater.

The steam engine was configured as a four-cylinder compound. The high pressure cylinders sloped steeply between the frame sides, the low pressure cylinders were located in the usual, horizontal position outside the frame. Both pairs of cylinders drove the second coupled axle. To control the supply to the low pressure cylinders there was a normal Walschaerts valve gear which also controlled the inside cylinders via pendulum levers. A special feature was the Lindner starting cock, already well known on two-cylinder compounds, which could supply additional live steam to the low pressure cylinders when working at over 60%.

Westinghouse compressed-air brakes were installed for locomotive braking. This worked on one side only of all carrying and coupled wheels. Locomotives 19 012, 015, 017 and 022 were later fitted with Riggenbach counter-pressure brakes.

The vehicles were coupled to Saxon sä 2'2' T 31 tenders.

== Reconstruction ==
During 1963–1965 the locomotives fitted with a Riggenbach counter-pressure brake, nos. 19 015 and 19 022, were converted into trials locomotives by the VES-M Halle trials depot. They served as braking locomotives during performance trials.

The two engines were given new 39 E boilers of the type designed for the 03.10, 39 and 41. The engine was originally heavily influenced by the dimensions of the turntables available in 1918 and was therefore not optimised for normal running. In addition to changes to the frame, it was modified with new 1000 mm diameter carrying wheels. This increased the overall wheelbase from 11,960 mm to 12,100 mm. New driver's cabs, Witte smoke deflectors, circular smokebox doors, a common cover for the steam dome and sand box as well as the arrangement of all pumps on a special mounting gave the engines a very different appearance. Number 19 015 was coupled to a 2'3 T 38 tender from H 45 024. In 1967 both locomotives were converted to oil firing.

In 1970 the two engines were renumbered to 04 0015 and 04 0022. In 1975/76 they were retired and scrapped.

== See also ==
- Royal Saxon State Railways
- List of Saxon locomotives and railbuses

== Literature ==
- Ebel, Jürgen U. (2000). Sächsische Schnellzuglokomotiven Band 2: Sachsenstolz Die Gattung XX H V Die Reichsbahnbaureihe 19.0 (in German). Freiburg: EK-Verlag. ISBN 3-88255-120-8.
- Hütter, Ingo (2009). Die Dampflokomotiven der Baureihen 01 bis 45 der DRG, DRB, DB, und DR (in German). Werl: DGEG Medien. pp. 202–203. ISBN 978-3-937189-45-1.
- Näbrich, Fritz; Preuß, Reiner; Meyer, Günter (1984). Lokomotiven sächsischer Eisenbahnen, Schnellzug- und Personenzuglokomotiven (EFA 2.1) (in German). Düsseldorf: Alba. pp. 185–188, 214. ISBN 3-87094-096-4.
- Näbrich, Fritz; Meyer, Günter; Preuß, Reiner (1983). Lokomotivarchiv Sachsen 2 (in German). Berlin: transpress VEB Verlag für Verkehrswesen.
- Preuß, Erich; Preuß, Rainer (1991). Sächsische Staatseisenbahnen (in German). Berlin: transpress Verlagsgesellschaft mbH. ISBN 3-344-70700-0.
- Reiche, Günther (1998). Richard Hartmann und seine Lokomotiven (in German). Berlin/Chemnitz: Oberbaumverlag. ISBN 3-928254-56-1.
- Wiegard, Hans (2001). Reko- und Neubaudampfloks der DR (in German). München: GeraMond Verlag. ISBN 3-7654-7103-8.
- Weisbrod, Manfred; Müller, Hans; Petznik, Wolfgang (1976). Dampflokomotiven deutscher Eisenbahnen, Baureihe 01–39 (EFA 1.1) (in German) (3rd ed.). Düsseldorf: Alba Buchverlag. pp. 163–168. ISBN 3-87094-081-6.
