= Richard Hartmann =

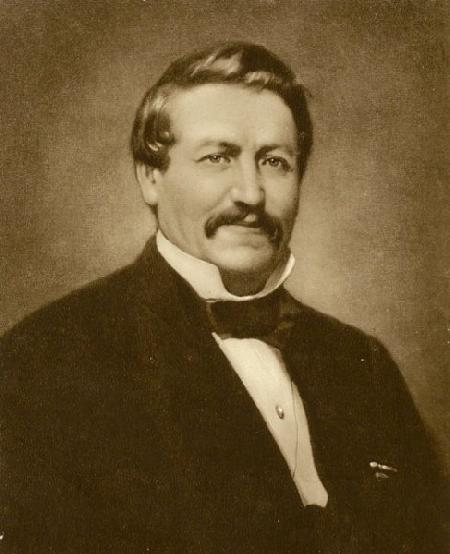
Richard Hartmann (1809–1878)

Richard Hartmann (8 November 1809 – 16 December 1878) was a German engineering manufacturer.

== Life ==
Hartmann was born on 8 November 1809 in Barr, Bas-Rhin, the son of a tawer (Weissgerber, a tanner of white leather). In his Alsace homeland he learnt the trade of a toolmaker (Zeugschmied). In 1828 his years of travel as a journeyman began, ending up in 1832 in Chemnitz, allegedly with only 2 talers in his pocket. In Chemnitz, Hartmann began to work for various factory owners. One of his employers was Carl Gottlieb Haubold, the founder of the Chemnitz Engineering Works (Chemnitzer Maschinenbau). In Haubold's company, Hartmann rose from journeyman to foreman (Akkordmeister). In 1837 he earned became a citizen. That same year he left Haubold's factory and bought an engineering shop with his colleague, Karl Illing, in Annaberger Strasse at the foot of the Kassberg. Here, Hartmann and Illing repaired cotton-spinning machines, together with three journeymen. The business flourished and after a short time it took on the manufacture of complete spinning machines.

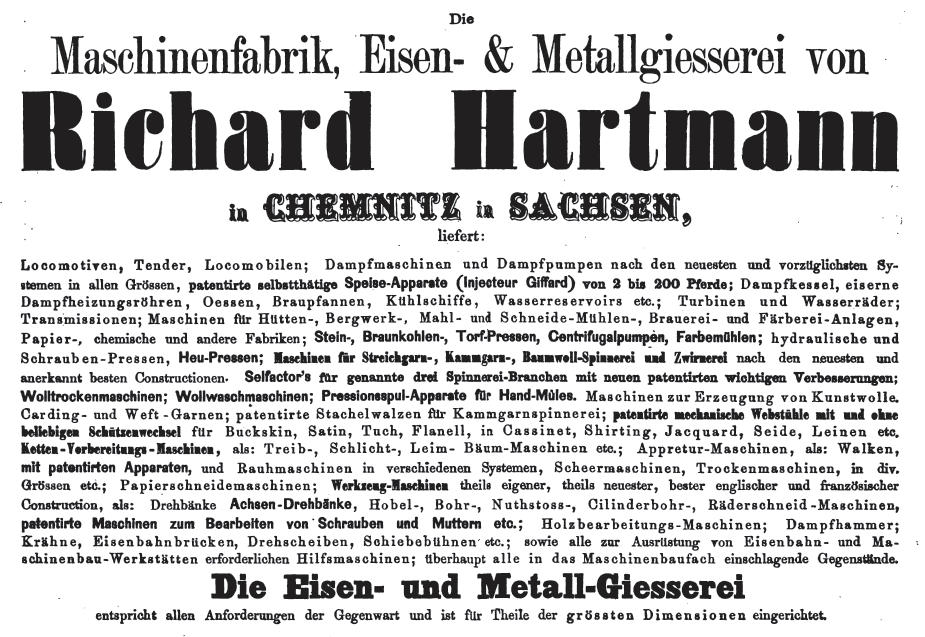
Advertisement for Hartmann's factory (1861)

In 1839 Hartmann fell out with Illing and founded the firm of "Götze & Hartmann" with August Götze, in which Götze was responsible for the commercial side and Hartmann for the technical aspects. In the same year Hartmann secured the rights to a slubbing frame (a type of wool spinning machine) for 1000 talers from a penniless inventor. This proved to be the beginning of a breakthrough for the company, which at that time numbered about 30 workers. These slubbing frames established Hartmann's reputation as a spinning machine producer beyond the Chemnitz area. In 1840 the growing company, which already had 76 employees, moved to new premises in Gablenz, but just a year later it outgrew those and the firm moved again to Chemnitz's Klostermühle. Its range of products had expanded in the meantime. In 1840 the firm delivered its first steam locomotive. In 1843 Richard Hartmann was awarded a gold medal for a new spinning machine. In 1844 Hartmann moved his company again and found new sheds at what later became Hartmannstrasse. At that time he employed about 350 workers. That year the company also set up its own iron foundry.

The year 1848 was a milestone in the life of Richard Hartmann and his company. Together with Theodor Steinmetz the firm succeeded in manufacturing its first steam locomotive. The Saxon state government had supported the step towards locomotive construction with a credit of 30,000 talers in order to be able to develop its own locomotive manufacturing base that was not reliant on imports. The Hartmann locomotives proved to be competitive against their English counterparts and were exported worldwide in the decades that followed (especially to Canada, Argentina, Brazil, Turkey and Indonesia). Hartmann became the main supplier to the Royal Saxon State Railways, but he was far-sighted enough not to concentrate exclusively on locomotive construction. At the end of the 1850s the production portfolio of his firm including the manufacture of turbines and mill equipment, mining machinery, drilling equipment and heavy machine tools. In 1857 his company numbered 1500 employees.

In 1870 the company became the Sächsische Maschinenfabrik vormals Richard Hartmann AG. At that time it had a work force of 2700. Hartmann took over the chairmanship of the board.

Richard Hartmann lived in the immediate vicinity of his factory in a villa on Kassbergstrasse. He died here on 16 December 1878 following a stroke.

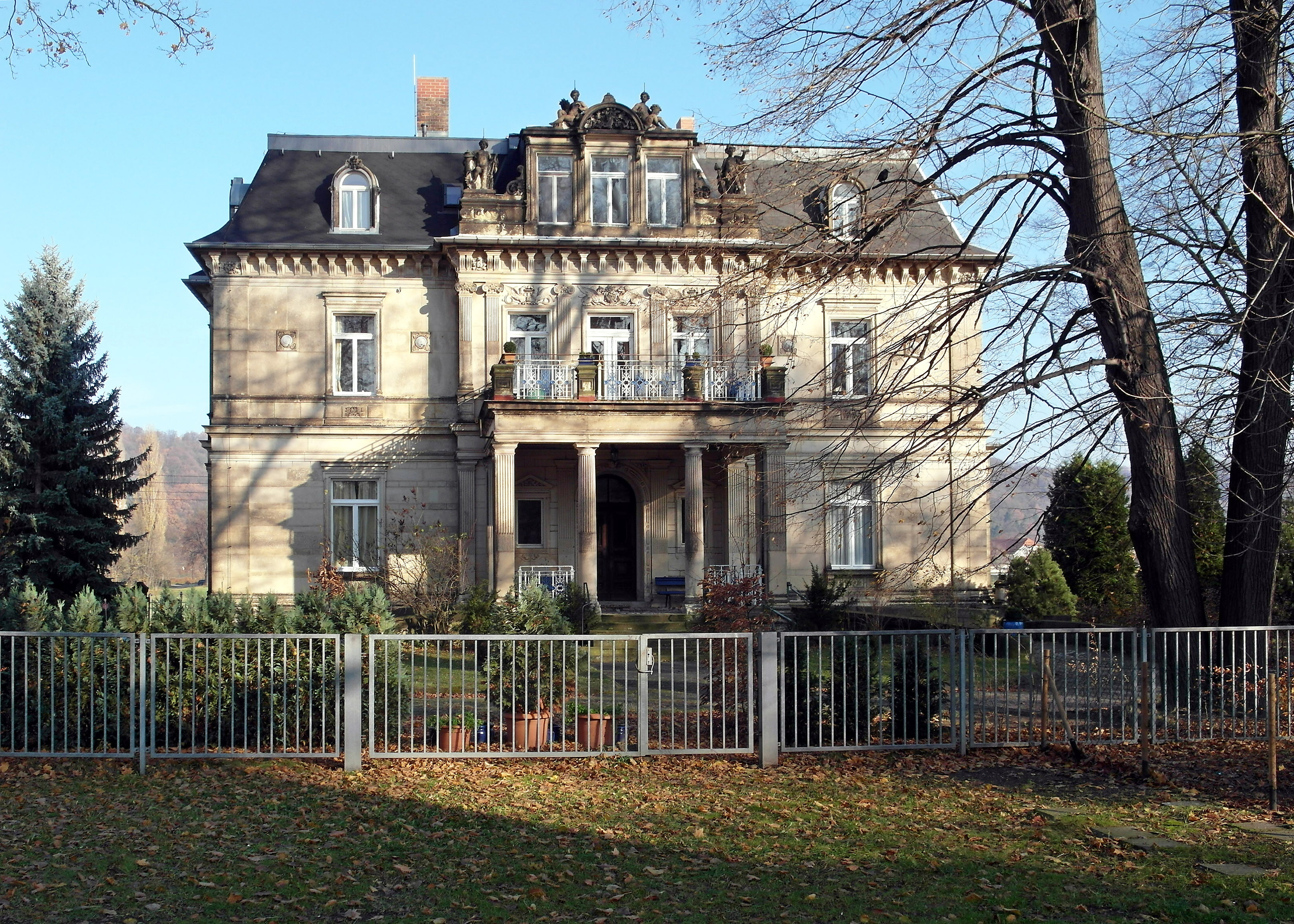
Villa Hartmann, in 2012

From 1874 to 1877 he had a summer residence known as Villa Hartmann built on the banks of the Elbe river at Laubegaster Ufer 34 in Dresden-Laubegast by the architects Hübner & Baron in the style of Gottfried Semper. This villa was used by his son Gustav Hartmann (1842–1910, German engineering manufacturer and CEO of Dresdner Bank) from 1881 as his house. The villa is still used today and can be visited on anniversaries.

In 1880 the road nearest the factory was named Hartmannstrasse. The Vierfeld sports hall, opened in 2002 on the site of the former factory, and the Chemnitz vocational school also bear his name. Of the former factory structures only a few remain, of which one is under a preservation order, the engineering building known as the Richard-Hartmann-Halle and the former headquarters building which is now used by the police service.

== Significance ==
Richard Hartmann was one of the most important Saxon businessmen and the most successful factory owner in Chemnitz in the 2nd half of the 19th century. He was an important trailblazer and pioneer for engineering in Saxony, which gained worldwide reputation through his efforts. Hartmann succeeded in establishing a locomotive construction industry in Saxony that rivalled that in England. The Sächsische Maschinenfabrik that he founded was the largest company in Saxony and played a role in Chemnitz becoming one of the greatest industrial centres in Germany after 1870.

== Award ==
The Industrieverein Sachsen 1828 (Industrial Society of Saxony) presents a "Richard Hartmann" award, with €5000 of prize money, for outstanding industry-related, scientific, technical and economic successes with a high degree of innovation.

== See also ==
- List of railway pioneers
- Hartmannwerke
- Sächsische Maschinenfabrik

== Sources ==
- Richard Hartmann AG (Hrsg.): Lokomotiven. Ausgabe 1910. Selbstverlag, Chemnitz 1910 (Digitalisat)
- Richard Hartmann AG (Hrsg.): 1837–1912. Jubiläumsschrift aus Anlass des 75jährigen Bestehens der Sächsischen Maschinenfabrik vorm. Richard Hartmann Aktiengesellschaft. Selbstverlag, Chemnitz 1912
- Günther Reiche: Der Chemnitzer Maschinenbauer Richard Hartmann und seine Lokomotiven. Eine Faktensammlung. Oberbaum Verlag, Chemnitz 1998, ISBN 3-928254-56-1
- Günther Reiche: Richard Hartmann. 8. November 1809 - 16. Dezember 1878. Vom Zeugschmied zum sächsischen Lokomotivenkönig. Reihe Chemnitzer Lebensbilder Band 6, Verlag Heimatland Sachsen, Chemnitz 2007, ISBN 3-910186-60-2
- Tilo Richter (Hrsg.): Der Kaßberg. Ein Chemnitzer Lese- und Bilderbuch. Passage-Verlag, Leipzig 1996, ISBN 3-9805299-0-8
- Bernhard Rost: Richard Hartmann, der große Chemnitzer Maschinenbauer. Ein Lebensbild zur 100. Wiederkehr seines Geburtstages. Chemnitz 1909
- Gabriele Viertel: Von André bis Zöllner. 125 Biografien zur Chemnitzer Geschichte. Reintzsch-Verlag, Radebeul 1998, ISBN 3-930846-13-6, S. 42.
- 600 Jahre Laubegast, 1408 - 2008, Verlag Die Fähre, 2004
