= Saxon VI K =

Class of German narrow-gauge 0-10-0T locomotives

Saxon VI K DR Class 99.64–65, 99.67–71
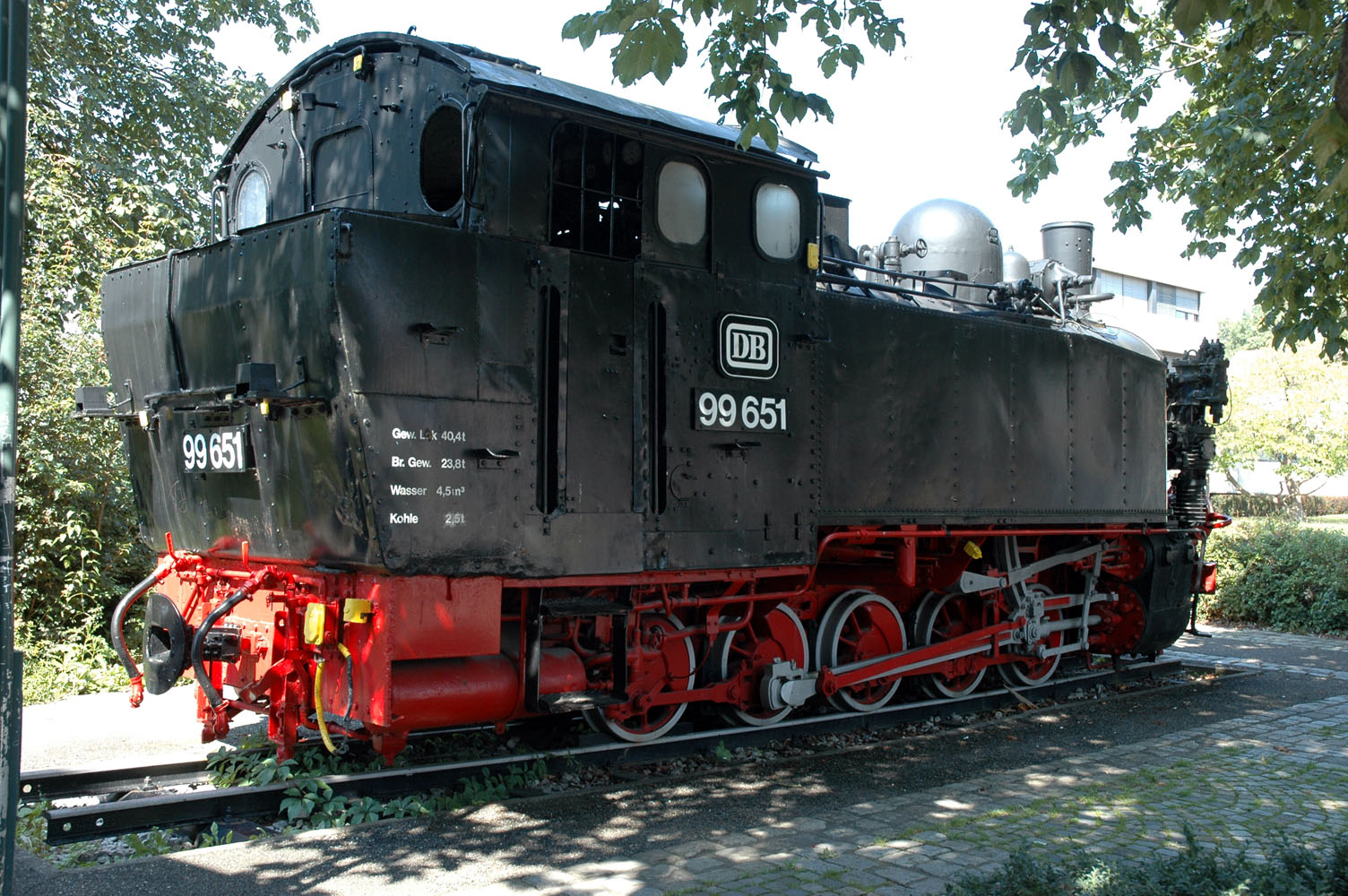
- 99 651 plinted at Steinheim an der Murr in August 2007
Type and origin
- Builder: Henschel & Sohn; Sächsische Maschinenfabrik; Maschinenbau-Gesellschaft Karlsruhe
- Build date: 99.64–65: 1918–1919; 99.67–71: 1923–1927
- Total produced: 99.64–65: 15; 99.67–71: 47
Specifications
- Configuration
  - Whyte: 0-10-0T
  - German: K 55.8
- Gauge: 750 mm (2 ft 5 1/2 in)
- Coupled dia.: 800 mm (2 ft 7 1/2 in)
- Length
  - Over couplers: 99.64–65: 8,680 mm (28 ft 5 3/4 in); 99.67–71: 8,990 mm (29 ft 5 7/8 in)
- Width: 2,400 mm (7 ft 10 1/2 in)
- Height: 3,550 mm (11 ft 7 3/4 in)
- Adhesive weight: 99.64–65: 40.40 t (39.76 long tons; 44.53 short tons); 99.67–71: 42.25 t (41.58 long tons; 46.57 short tons)
- Empty weight: 99.64–65: 30.40 t (29.92 long tons; 33.51 short tons); 99.67–71: 32.50 t (31.99 long tons; 35.83 short tons)
- Service weight: 99.64–65: 40.40 t (39.76 long tons; 44.53 short tons); 99.67–71: 42.25 t (41.58 long tons; 46.57 short tons)
- Fuel capacity: 99.64–65: 2.0 t (2.0 long tons; 2.2 short tons); 99.67–71: 2.5 t (2.5 long tons; 2.8 short tons)
- Water cap.: 4.50 m^{3} (990 imp gal; 1,190 US gal)
- Boiler
  - Tube plates: 3,240 mm (10 ft 7 1/2 in)
- Boiler pressure: 14 kgf/cm^{2} (1.37 MPa; 199 lbf/in^{2})
- Heating surface
  - Firebox: 1.61 m^{2} (17.3 sq ft)
  - Radiative: 6.06 m^{2} (65.2 sq ft)
  - Evaporative: 64.32 m^{2} (692.3 sq ft)
- Superheater
  - Heating area: 24.50 m^{2} (263.7 sq ft)
- Cylinders: Two
- Cylinder size: 430 mm (16 15/16 in)
- Piston stroke: 400 mm (15 3/4 in)
- Valve gear: Walschaerts (Heusinger)
- Loco brake: Körting vacuum brake; Heberlein cable brake; Knorr air brake
Performance figures
- Maximum speed: 30 km/h (19 mph)
- Indicated power: 480 PS (353 kW; 473 hp)
- Tractive effort
  - Starting: 76.20 kN (17,130 lbf)
Career
- Numbers: 99.64–65: Sä.St.E: 210–224 → DRG 99 641 – 99 655; 99.67–71: DRG: 99 671 – 99 717
- Retired: 99.64–65: by 1969; 99.67–71: by 1974

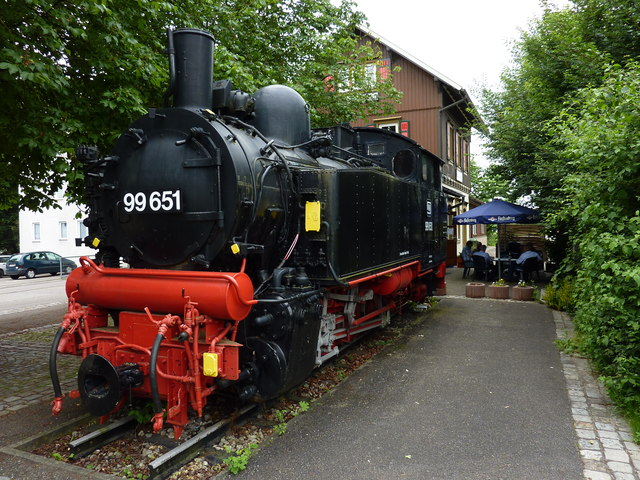
99 651 plinthed in Steinheim, 2010

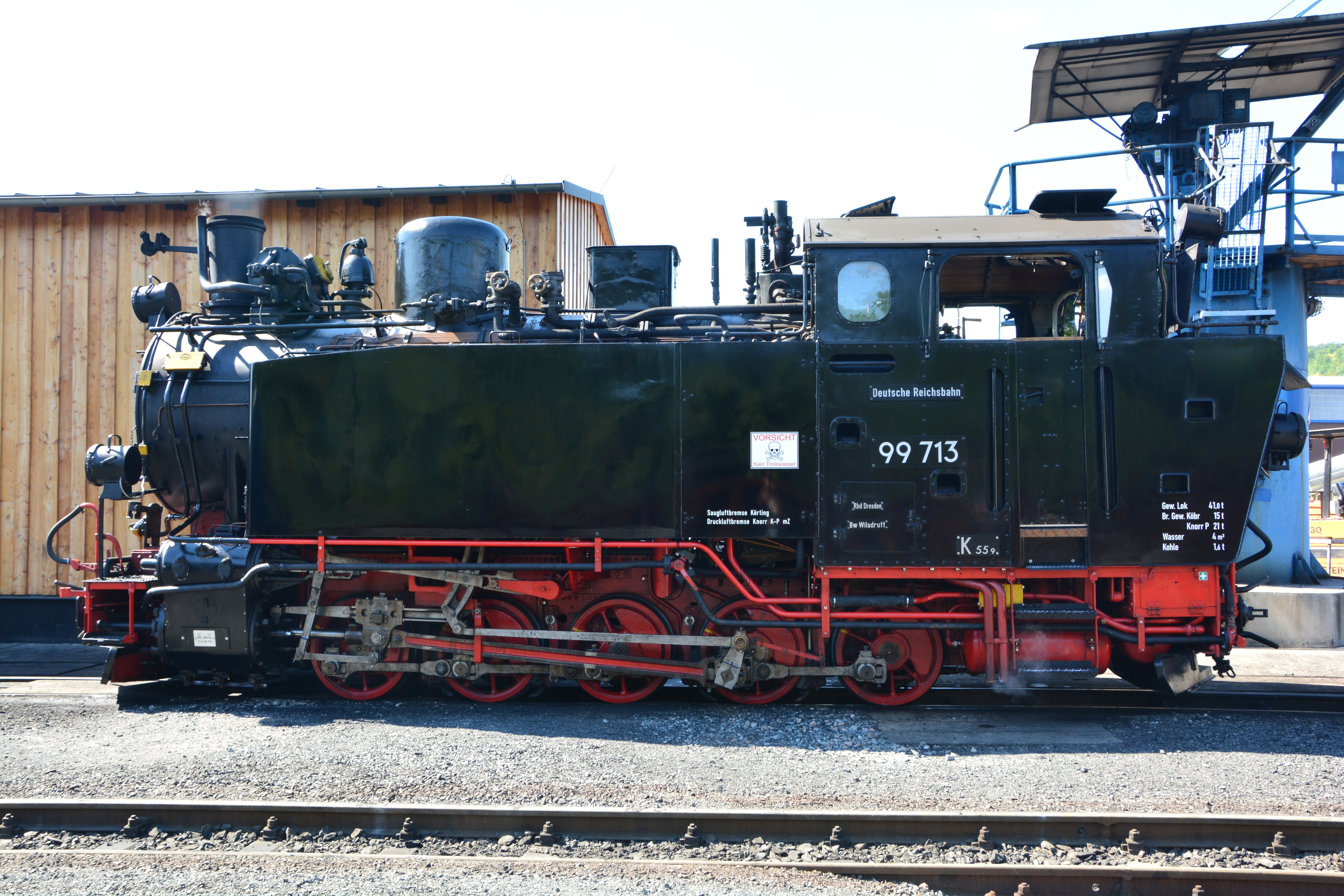
99 713 in Freital-Hainsberg, July 2018

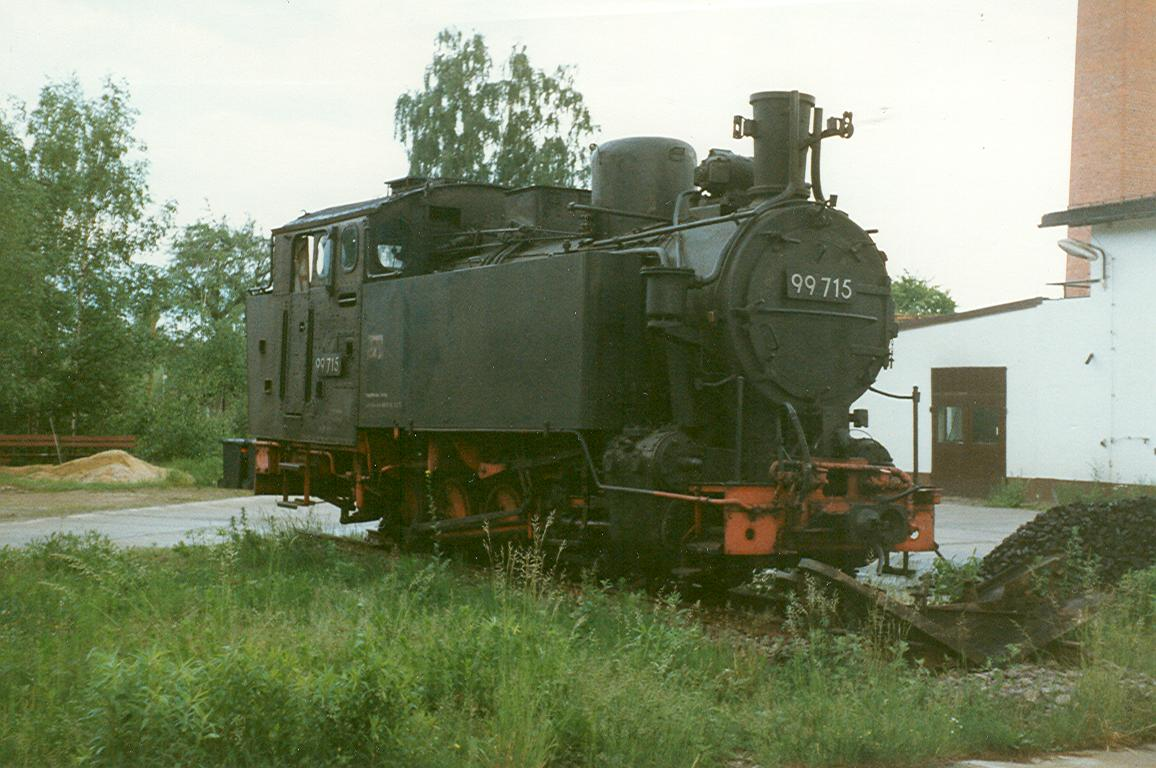
99 715 out of service in Wilsdruff, 1993

99 715 at Jonsdorf, 2015

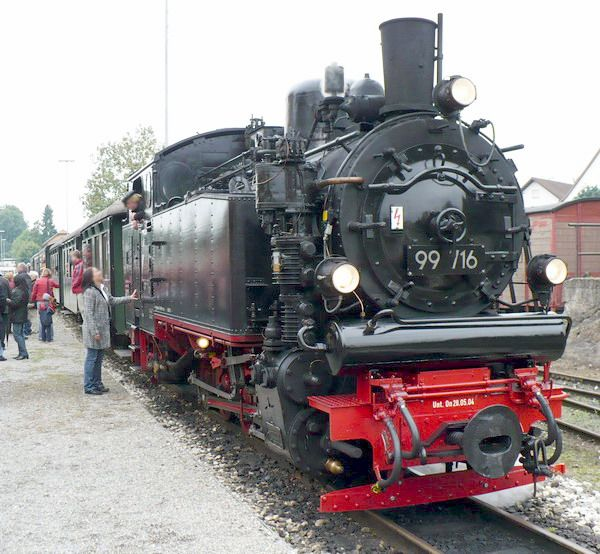
99 716 in Ochsenhausen, 2008

The Saxon VI K were a class of 750-mm gauge 0-10-0T locomotives of the Royal Saxon States Railways with a gauge of 750 mm (2 ft 5 1/2 in). In 1925 the Deutsche Reichsbahn (DRG) grouped the locomotives into class 99.64–65; from 1923 to 1927 the procured more locomotives of this type which were grouped in to class 99.67–71.

== Technical features ==
The VI K were ten-coupled superheated steam locomotives. The first, third and fifth wheelset of the locomotive had a lateral motion device (Gölsdorf axle), whereby a reset device was installed to guide the first and fifth axis. This consists of a steel disc that is fastened in the centre of the wheelset shaft and centred by spring-loaded pressure pieces. This construction made it possible to drive through curved tracks with as sharp a radius of 50 m (164 ft). The drive was originally to the fourth axle, but was changed to the third axle on the locomotives that were renewed by the DR. The locomotives had Schmidt superheaters. The brakes were Körting-type vacuum brakes, the cable reel for the Heberlein brake and, on the newly built locomotives, also a Knorr-type air brake as an additional brake. The Württemberg locomotives only had a Knorr type air brake.

== History ==
=== Original design ===
The locomotives were originally developed for the army administration. Fifteen locomotives were built by Henschel & Sohn of Cassel. They were to be used on Polish narrow-gauge lines. Due to the Peace Treaty of Brest-Litovsk, operations in the east was no longer possible. In 1919 the Saxon State Railways bought all the locomotives in the class for their narrow-gauge lines. They were given the Saxon railway numbers 210 to 224. The Deutsche Reichsbahn took over all vehicles as the 99.64–65 series with the numbers 99 641 to 99 655.

The locomotives 99 650 and 99 651 came to the Reichsbahndirektion Stuttgart at the end of 1928, which they allocated to Bw Aulendorf for use on the Ochsenhausen local railway. Both locomotives were the main vehicles of the Württemberg narrow-gauge Biberach – Warthausen – Ochsenhausen railway line until passenger traffic was discontinued on 31 May 1964. Then they came to the Bottwartalbahn.

Locomotives 99 643 and 99 647 came from Saxony to Austria in July 1944, the former immediately to the Waldviertler Schmalspurbahnen, at least 99 647 initially to the Vellachtalbahn in Carinthia. According to Gemainböck, both VI Ks were briefly present there. From August 1944 both Saxon VI Ks are said to have been stationed in Gmünd (main depot of the Waldviertel narrow-gauge railways). From there they came to the Soviet Union as reparations in December 1948.

The 99 649 was already lost in World War II; the 99 641, 645 and 652 had to be handed over to the Soviet Union after 1945.

The last two examples on the Deutsche Bundesbahn, the Bottwartalbahn locomotives, were retired on 31 July and 29 September 1969. The latter, number 99 651, was then plinthed as a memorial in Steinheim an der Murr. It was the only narrow-gauge steam locomotive of the Deutsche Bundesbahn that still had an EDP-fleet number.

=== New-build locomotives of the Deutsche Reichsbahn ===
The locos of class 99.67–71 of the Deutsche Reichsbahn were additional copies of the Saxon VI K, which were built between 1923 and 1927. They had the fleet numbers 99 671 to 99 717. The 47 locomotives were built by Henschel & Sohn (13 locomotives), Sächsischen Maschinenfabrik vormals Richard Hartmann, AG Chemnitz (22) and the Maschinenbau-Gesellschaft Karlsruhe (12).

A number of these locomotives were also used in Württemberg on the Bottwartalbahn and the Zabergäubahn: 99 679 to 99 683 were immediately delivered to Württemberg, later 99 671, 672, 698, 701, 704 and 716 were moved from Saxony to Württemberg. Most of these machines were in service with the Deutsche Bundesbahn until around 1965; in 1967 the 99 704 was the last to be withdrawn.

Except for a few details, the addition locomotives hardly differed from their original predecessors. Outwardly, the new locomotives were mainly recognizable by the less rounded cladding of the steam dome.

In 1927 Maschinenfabrik Esslingen built four meter-gauge locomotives of this type, which were classified as class 99.19 on the Deutsche Reichsbahn.

In the 1960s the Deutsche Reichsbahn (DR) subjected seven locomotives (99 673, 678, 685, 692, 703, 713 and 715) to a general overhaul (GR). New welded boilers were installed. Some of them also received new water tanks and coal bunkers

In 1964/65, seven other locomotives were "renewed" by the RAW Görlitz – often referred to colloquially as "reconstruction", although de jure there was no reconstruction program for narrow-gauge locomotives and wagons in the GDR. The major part of the renovation was a disguised new construction program. The de facto newly built locomotives had new boilers, welded driver's cabs and storage tanks based on the model of the Einheitslokomotiven (standard locomotives), as well as new frames with a uniform axle-spacing of 1,000 mm (3 ft 3 3/8 in) – an increase form the previous value of 930 mm (3 ft 5/8 in). In the new building, the drive was relocated from the fourth to the third coupled wheel set, which was mounted in the frame without lateral motion. The second and fourth wheel sets now had side-play. The new locomotives also had vacuum and compressed air brakes as locomotive brakes, while the Körting-type vacuum brakes or the Heberlein brake were used to brake trains. This new building concerned the three original VI K numbers 997 648, 99 653 and 99 654 as well as four of the later locomotives with the numbers 99 687, 694, 696 and 706.

In 1970, the locomotives that remained in the Reichsbahn operations fleet were given a new number by inserting a "1" between the "99" class number and the last three digits of the fleet number; the new number was completed with hyphen followed by an EDP check-digit.

The Dresden Reichsbahndirektion retired both the seven refurbished and the seven renewed VI Ks by 1975.

=== Service in other countries ===
One of the locomotives, 99 702, remained in Frýdlant v Čechách after the Second World War. After a repair, it was used from 1948 by the Czechoslovak State Railways (ČSD) as U58.001 on the Třemešná ve Slezsku–Osoblaha Railway. In 1957 she came back to Frydlant, where she was used until 1960 in train service on the Frýdlant–Heřmanice Railway verwendet wurde. It was retired at the end of 1962 and scrapped a little later.

=== Preserved Locomotives ===
The 99 651 is the last remaining locomotive from the original series. On 10 June 2016, it was brought from Steinheim an der Murr for sheltered storage at the Öchsle Museum Railway to Ochsenhausen. In a first step, it should be made rollable again.

The locomotives 99 713 and 715 were also preserved, initially in Radebeul-Ost. 99 713 was kept operational by the DR as a traditionslokomotive, 99 715 served as a spare parts donor and was officially a monument locomotive in front of the museum train in Radebeul Ost. In 1992, 99 713 was given the new fleet number 099 720 on paper, but it was rarely used. 99 715 was sold in 1991 to the later GbR 99 715 Wilsdruff and finally refurbished until 2003. She has been employed by the Preßnitztalbahn since 2004 and can be seen in operation. The 99 713 wenth to the Sächsische Dampfeisenbahngesellschaft (SDG) in 2004. It was transferred to Oberwiesenthal in October 2015 after a long period of storage, received a general inspection there and has been operational again since July 2017.

99 716 was in the Güglingen local history museum for 25 years and was taken over by the Öchsle Museum Railway in 1993 as a loan from the Nuremberg Transport Museum. From 1997 she was in use again. In the summer of 2008, Öchsle-Bahn AG acquired the steam locomotive from the DB Museum in Nuremberg. It has not been operational since December 2011 due to expired deadlines; work has been underway for a new general inspection since 2017.

Fleet No.	Year built	Manufacturer	Serial number	Owner	Preserved on	Preserved at	Serviceable?
99 651	1918	Henschel	16132	City of Steinheim an der Murr	Öchsle	Ochsenhausen	No, awaiting overhaul
99 713	1927	Hartmann	4670	Sächsische Dampfeisenbahngesellschaft (SDG)	Lößnitzgrundbahn	Radebeul	Yes
99 715	1927	Hartmann	4672	GbR 99 715 group	Preßnitztalbahn	Jöhstadt	Yes
99 716	1927	Hartmann	4673	Öchsle Bahn AG	Öchsle	Warthausen	No, under overhaul
