= Saxon Railway Museum =

Museum

Coordinates: 50°51′41″N 12°58′04″E

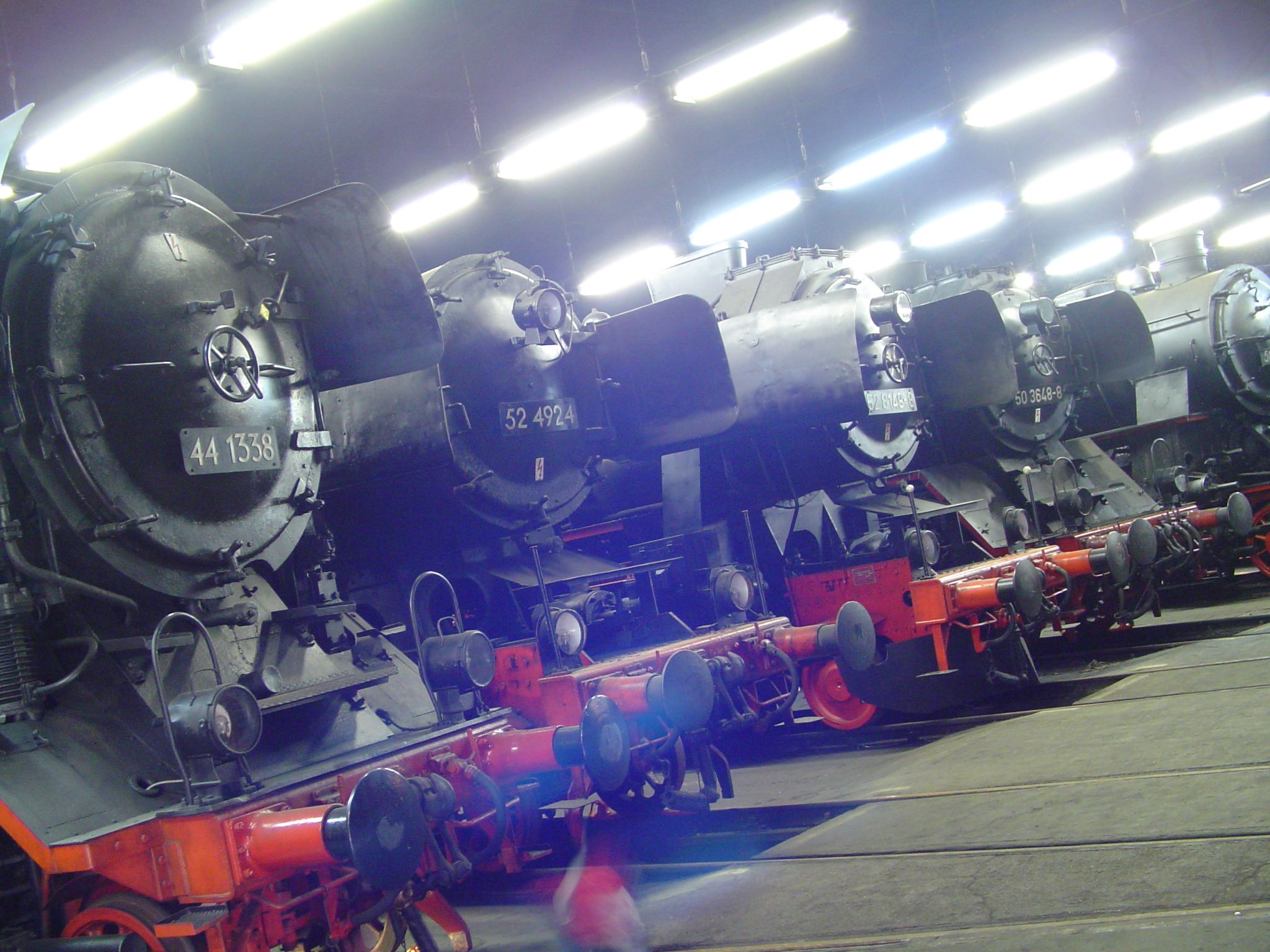
Inside the roundhouse of the Saxon Railway Museum at Chemnitz

Saxon Railway Museum, Chemnitz, Saxony

The Saxon Railway Museum (Sächsisches Eisenbahnmuseum or SEM, today "Schauplatz Eisenbahn") is located in Chemnitz, in the state of Saxony, Germany. It is situated on the site of the former locomotive depot (Bahnbetriebswerk or Bw) for goods train locomotives in the district Hilbersdorf.

After the locomotive depot was closed in 1992, the society moved into the buildings which were protected as historical monuments. As a result, the museum has two roundhouses with 20-metre (66 ft) turntables. In addition there are coaling and sanding facilities, water cranes, a working jack for inspection pits and a range of other equipment found in an operational depot.

The exhibition area describes and portrays the evolution of the railway in Saxony and especially in the area of Chemnitz. In addition to an extensive range of steam, diesel and electric locomotives, the museum also has a large collection of operational, narrow-gauge, Feldbahn engines.

Many of the locomotives on show are loaned from private individuals, from the Dresden Transport Museum or the Nuremberg Transport Museum. As a result, the museum's collection includes the following:

- Ex-Saxon XII H2 steam locomotive, no. 38 205
- DRG Class 43 steam locomotive, no. 43 001
- Ex-Saxon XIV HT steam locomotive, no. 75 515
- DRG Class 86 steam locomotive, no. 86 001
- DR Class V 180 diesel locomotive, no. 180 141
- DR Class 119 diesel locomotive, no. 219 003
- DR Class V 60 diesel locomotive, no. V 60 1001
- DRB Class E 94 electric locomotive, no. 254 059
- DRG Class E 44 electric locomotive, no. E 44 045.

Special vehicles in the museum's fleet include a Tatra T141 tractor with a Culemeyer heavy trailer.

There is also a working DRG Class 50 steam locomotive, no. 50 3648, that is regularly used for special trips. At the end of August each year there is a large festival (Heizhausfest) with a parade of historic locomotives.

1929 was a rope shunting system built in Hilbersdorf. This unique system of the marshalling yard was restored in 2014. Main components are the rope shunting system, the signal boxes and the historic machine station (with three rope-tensioning machines built by Siemens-Schuckert).

The SEM, together with the Museum of Technology Rope Shunting System, are also known as "Schauplatz Eisenbahn Chemnitz Hilbersdorf" (both located in Hilbersdorf). This new technical museum area is the largest one historic railway complex in Germany.

== Literature ==
Egon Kretzschmar: Die Bahnbetriebswerke in Chemnitz/Karl-Marx-Stadt Bildverlag Böttger, Witzschdorf 2003 ISBN 3-9808250-8-6 (German)
