= Sächsische Maschinenfabrik =

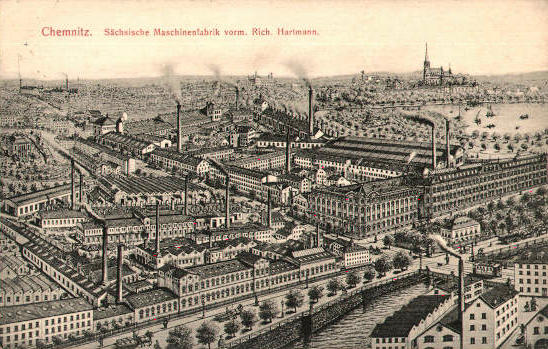
The Sächsische Maschinenfabrik, formerly Richard Hartmann locomotive works (around 1905)

The Sächsische Maschinenfabrik in Chemnitz was one of the most important engineering companies in Saxony in the second half of the 19th century and the first two decades of the 20th century. Including its various predecessor businesses, the firm existed from 1837 until its liquidation in 1930, and individual branches of the company taken over by others continued to operate until 1990. The company is closely linked with the name of its founder and long-time manager, Richard Hartmann, whose name formed part of the new company title in 1898: the Sächsische Maschinenfabrik vormals Richard Hartmann ('Saxon Engineering Factory, formerly Richard Hartmann').

== Major products ==
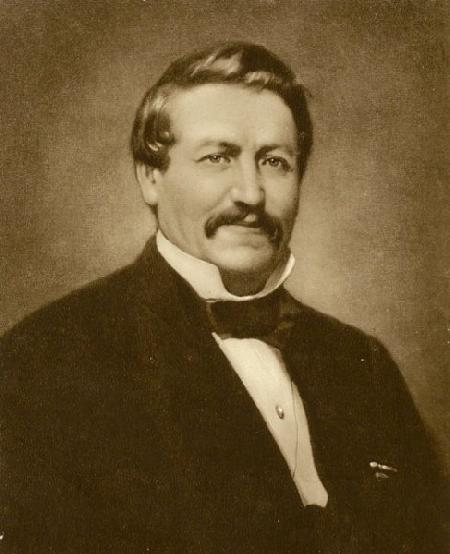
Richard Hartmann (1809–1878)

The main aim of the business was the development, design and production of:

- Spinning machines (1837–1998)
- Locomotives (1848–1929)
- Steam engines
- Turbines
- Mill equipment
- Military technology (about 1910–1918)

No less than 4,699 locomotives were built by the company between 1848 and 1929. The majority were delivered to the Royal Saxon State Railways (Königlich Sächsische Staatseisenbahnen), but customers for her locomotives were to be found worldwide. Equally impressive is the list of spinning and textile machines produced by Hartmann's business. Over many decades these machines from the factory in Chemnitz and its other subsidiaries set the standard for German engineering tradition.

== Company history ==
=== Founding and growth into a major business ===
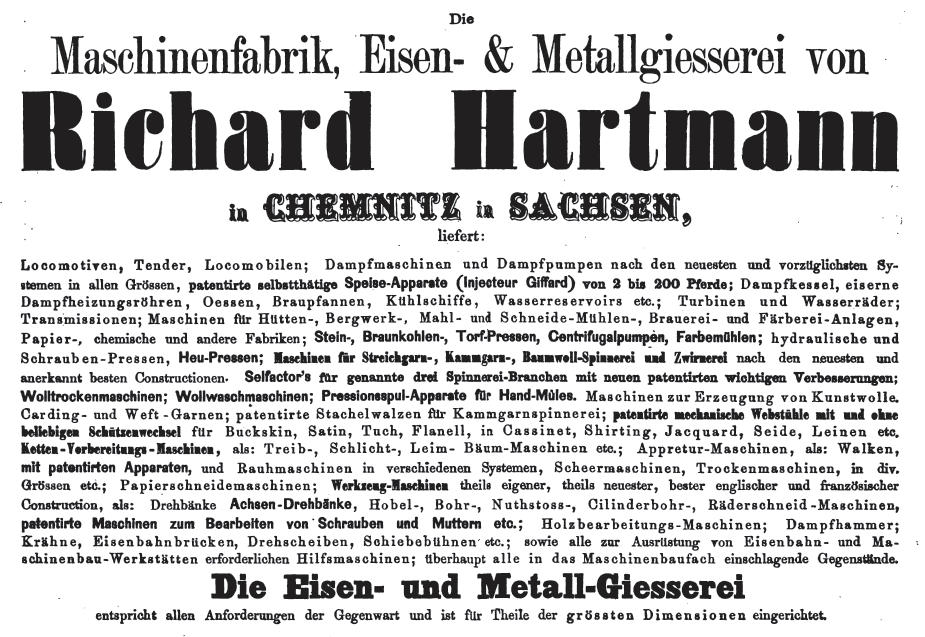
Poster for the engineering works (1861)

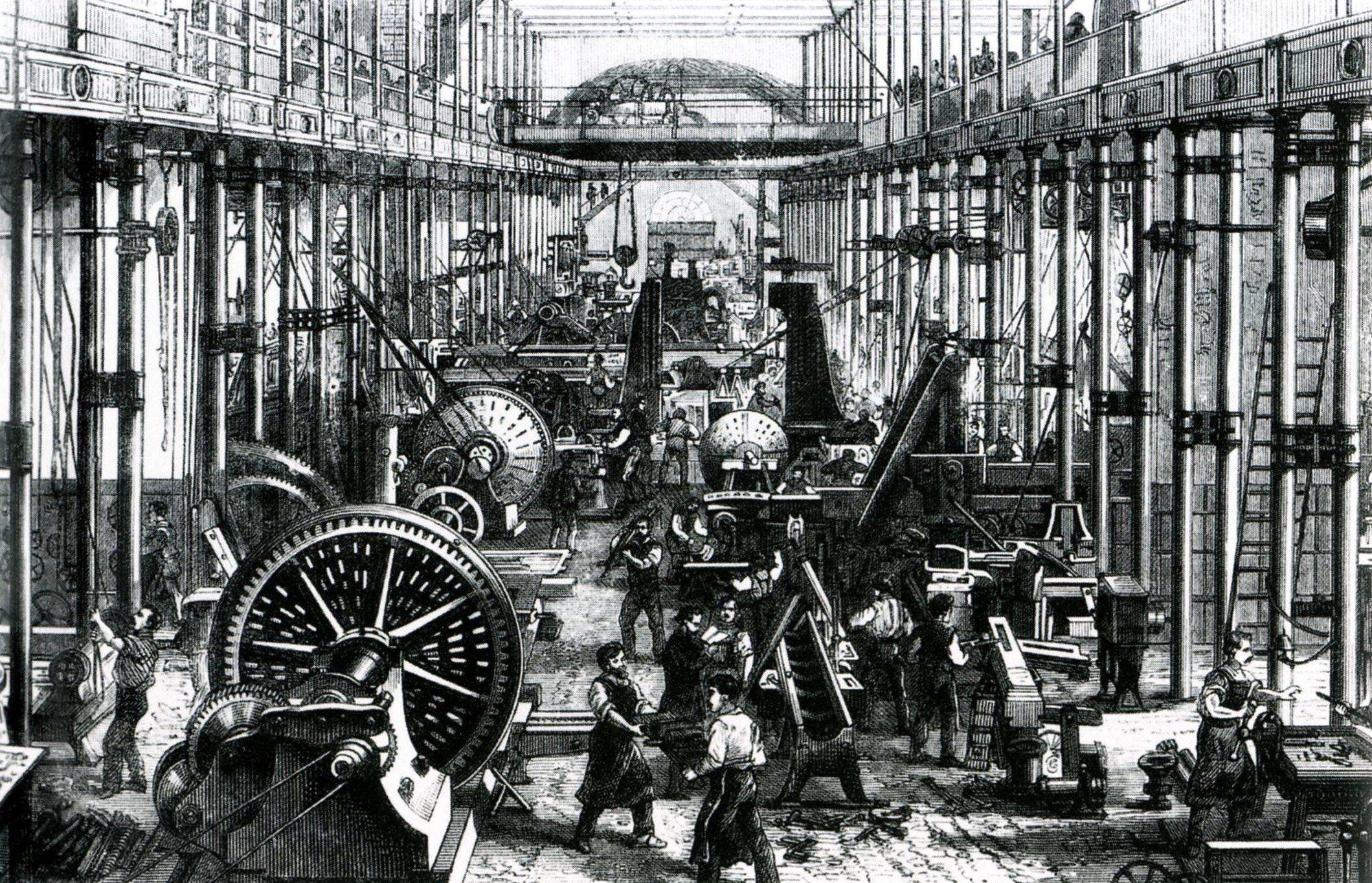
View of the production hall (1868)

In 1837 August Götze and Richard Hartmann founded the firm of Götze & Hartmann, that produced a very wide range of machines. Hartmann, who had acquired experience in numerous businesses, very quickly grasped the significance of many technical innovations. As early as 1839 the business developed the technical concept of a carded yarn speed frame that was developed into a marketable product and sold successfully. But the most important business was for some time the repair and design of individual technical solutions (equivalent to the present-day concept of special purpose machines). In 1842 about 200 employees were engaged in the business. In the years to 1845 the company underwent numerous expansions and relocations within the Chemnitz area.

From 1848 steam locomotives were built by the firm now dominated by Hartmann, but this branch of the business did not take off until a decade later. To begin with their major customer, the Royal Saxon State Railways, had to be convinced of the quality of their products through the delivery of very small batches of engines.

From 1855 the Sächsische Maschinenfabrik also produced turbines and mill equipment, so that by 1857 the work force had grown to about 1,500 employees. In the mid-1860s, steam locomotive production reached a very high level; to wit in 1868 a new production hall was built in which up to 36 locomotives could be simultaneously mounted.

=== Transition to a public limited company ===
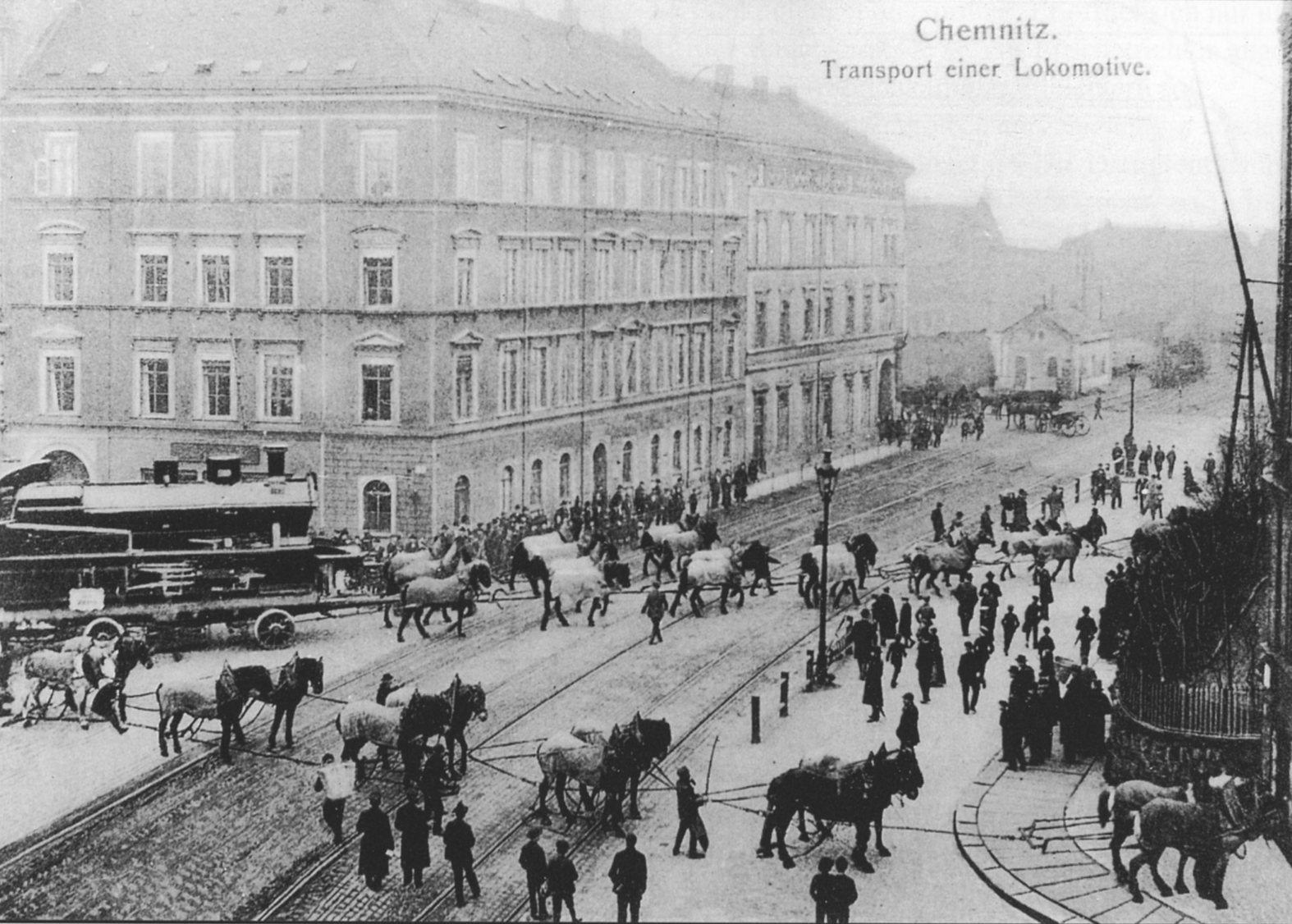
Transportation of a new locomotive to Chemnitz Central Station

In 1870 the business became the Sächsische Maschinenfabrik AG. Richard Hartmann took over the chairmanship of the governing board, a post he held until his death in 1878. The sons of Richard Hartmann were given important roles within the business.

In 1878 the 1000th locomotive left the production line of the Sächsischen Maschinenfabrik, numerous business expansions followed during this period, in order to meet the steadily growing demand from around the world. IN 1896 the construction of a new headquarters in Chemnitz was begun, in the same year a subsidiary was founded in Luhansk by one of Richard Hartmann's sons, Gustav Hartmann, that exists today as the Lokomotivfabrik Luhansk.

In 1898, in the course of restructuring, the business was renamed to the Sächsische Maschinenfabrik vormals Richard Hartmann Aktiengesellschaft.

At the beginning of the 20th century the business had also built up a strong armaments branch and produced, amongst other things, guns, artillery equipment and munitions. At that time various other companies were integrated into the business.

=== The demise of the company ===
In the 1920s the business continued to acquire numerous companies, including the 'King Friedrich-August Steelworks' in Freital-Potschappel, formerly an important supplier for the business, and finally the textile machine firm of Walter Löbel AG in Dresden. But the effects of the changing economic situation left the business increasingly in difficulties during the 1920s. Even the founding of the Deutsche Reichsbahn in 1920 and the wide distribution of locomotive construction quotas to different manufacturers led to a big reduction in the purchase of locomotives. Between 1920 and 1924 only 64 locomotives were built for the DRG, abroad the political aftermath of the First World War was also clearly taking effect.

In 1926 the machine tool business was wound up and several smaller firms took over the parts of the production. In 1928/29 the last major order was carried out for the DRG. But only 13 engines of the newly developed DRG Class 99.73-76 standard locomotives were delivered for the Saxon narrow gauge railways. The remaining portion of the planned order of 32 machines was picked up by the Berliner Maschinenbau (BMAG, formerly Schwartzkopff). After these 750 mm (2 ft 5 1/2 in) gauge engines, only six more locomotives were produced in the locomotive works at Chemnitz. After that the firm, which was already in economic difficulties, became a victim of the worldwide economic crisis.

=== Liquidation and successors ===
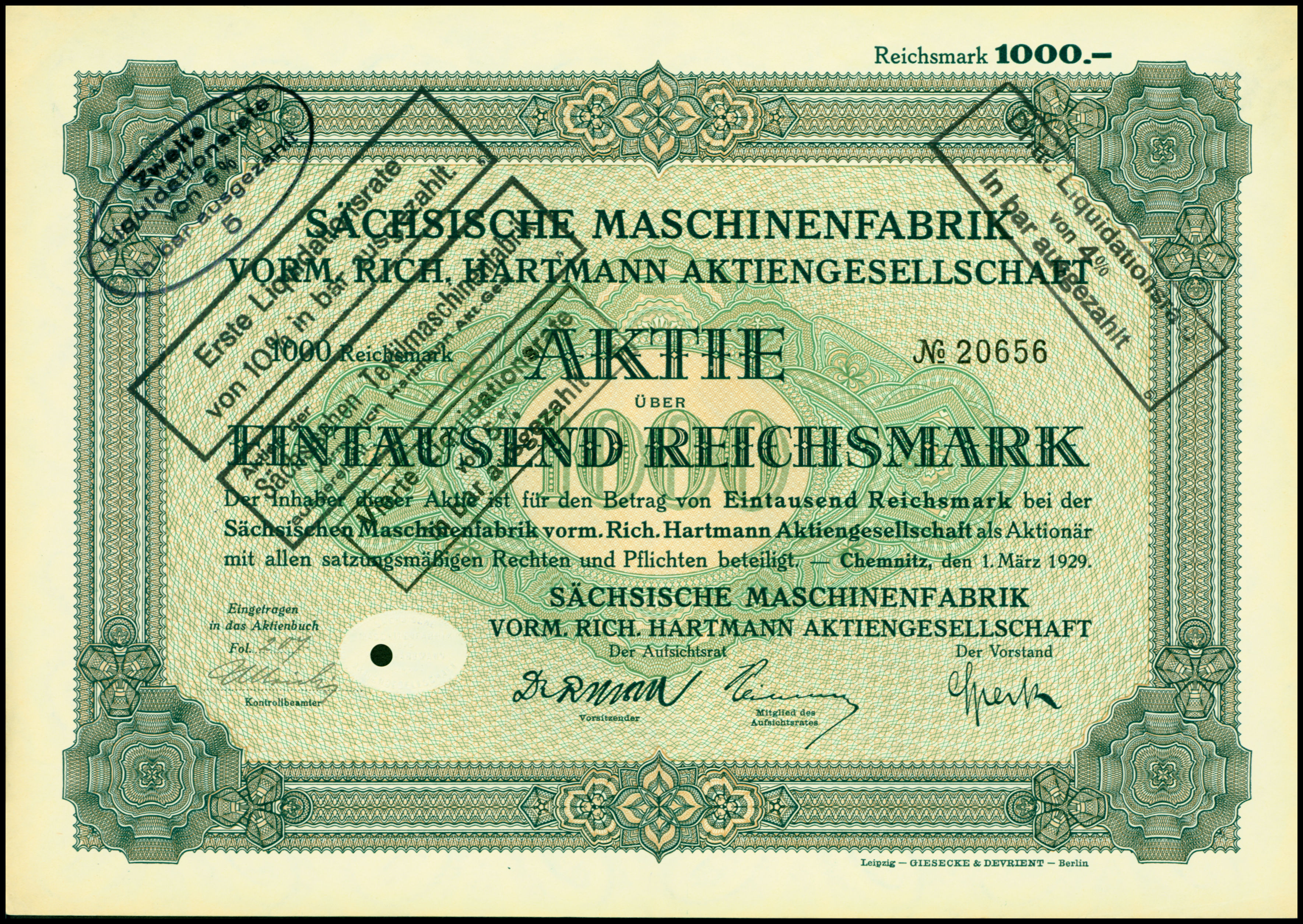
Share of the Sächsische Maschinenfabrik vorm. Rich. Hartmann AG, issued 1. March 1929

In 1928 the 'King Friedrich-August Works' in Potschappel was sold off again; the very disparate textile machinery division was restructured, and steam roller and locomotive construction ceased in 1929. The 'Sächsische Maschinenfabrik, vorm. Richard Hartmann AG' was liquidated in 1930, and the remaining economical core of the textile machinery division was incorporated into the newly formed Sächsische Textilmaschinenfabrik vorm. Richard Hartmann AG. As in the early days of the Hartmann enterprise, this company concentrated exclusively on spinning machines and weaver's looms. In 1933 it was amalgamated with several other companies into the Textil-Maschinen-Compagnie Chemnitz. The remaining area of business of the former Hartmann company was now purely spinning machines.

In the Second World War the bulk of the factory buildings, sites and equipment was destroyed and, after most of the remaining sites had been given to the Soviet Union as war reparations, there was only about a tenth of the facility left for starting it up again as the VEB Spinnereimaschinenbau in 1946. Until the reunification of Germany the firm was the leading manufacturer of textile machines for the production of spun cotton in the Eastern Bloc. In 1990 this firm became a Gesellschaft mit beschränkter Haftung (the German form of a limited liability company), the Chemnitzer Spinnereimaschinenbau GmbH, and was taken over by the trustee company. At the end of 1994 it was sold to the holding company, Neue Länder. Its main market in Eastern Europe was breaking up and overwhelming competition led to its amalgamation with two other Saxon textile machinery companies to form the CSM-Sächsische Spinnereimaschinen GmbH Chemnitz, but despite producing technically, high-quality products the firm ceased production in 1998 and subsequent folded, whereupon the last manufacturing elements of the firm's long tradition finally disappeared.

== Maintenance of tradition ==
In memory of the work of Richard Hartmanns, part of the former Leipziger Straße street in Chemnitz was renamed Hartmannstraße. The former villa of the company director is available today for exhibitions and a trade training centre in Chemnitz is called Richard-Hartmann-Schule. Since 1990 the memory and tradition associated with the names of Richard Hartmann and his Sächsischen Maschinenfabrik, is increasingly being recognised. In the town of Chemnitz, the Saxon metal and electric industry and the operators of locomotives from the factories of the Sächsischen Maschinenfabrik, a unique Saxon engineering tradition is associated with the name of this company.

The firm has also left a special legacy of its contribution to the provision of locomotives for the Saxon narrow gauge railways to this day. No less than 125 years after the delivery of the first engine for these narrow gauge railways in 1881, the Saxon Narrow Gauge Society (Verein zur Förderung sächsischer Schmalspurbahnen or VSSB) has ordered the construction of a copy of the Saxon Class I K.

== List of preserved products ==
=== Locomotives ===
Table of preserved locomotives
Works No.	Year	Type	Class	Fleet number	Location	Notes
164	1861	2-4-0		Bockwaer Eisenbahngesellschaft MULDENTHAL	Dresden Transport Museum (VMD)	
?	1869	0-6-0	ATE IIIa	ATE 18 DONNERSBERG, later ČSD 322.302	National Technical Museum (Prague)	
1112	1881	0-6-0	?	?	Asturias Railway Museum	
1435	1886	0-4-0T	Saxon VII T	K.Sächs.Sts.E.B. 1431 HEGEL, later DR 98 7056	Dresden Transport Museum (VMD)	
1759	1891	2-6-0T	SS Class 146 (changed to SS 300)	SS 346 and renumbered to DKA C11 40	Ambarawa Railway Museum	1,067 mm (3 ft 6 in) gauge
2102	1895	0-6-0T	NSB type XXVII	Urskog–Hølandbanen 2 Eidsverket later renamed Urskog	NSB railway museum, Hamar	750 mm (2 ft 5 1/2 in) gauge
2152	1896	2-6-0T	SS Class 229 (changed to SS 400)	SS 457 later renumbered to PT Kereta Api Indonesia C12 18	Excursion train on street running section at Surakarta, named "Sepur Kluthuk Jaladara"	1,067 mm (3 ft 6 in) gauge
2718	1901	0-6-0T	NIS Class 250	NIS 253, later renumbered to DKA C16 03	Ambarawa Railway Museum	1,067 mm (3 ft 6 in) gauge
2648	1902	0-4-4-0T (Fairlie)	Saxon I M	K.Sächs.Sts.E.B 252, later DR 99 162	Oberheinsdorf Station Museum	1,000 mm (3 ft 3 3/8 in) gauge
2773	1902	0-6-0T	NIS Class 250	NIS 256, later renumbered to DKA C17 04	Ambarawa Railway Museum	1,067 mm (3 ft 6 in) gauge
2790	1902	0-6-0T	SJS Class 100	SJS 112, later renumbered to DKA C19 12	Transportation Museum of Taman Mini Indonesia Indah	1,067 mm (3 ft 6 in) gauge
2792	1903	0-6-2T	NIS Class 350	NIS 351, later renumbered to DKA C20 01	Ambarawa Railway Museum	1,067 mm (3 ft 6 in) gauge
2944	1905	2-6-0		D 825	Limfjordsbanen (DJK) Aalborg, Denmark	Undergoing Restoration
3092	1907	0-4-4-2T	SS Class 340 (later SS Class 500)	SS 512, later renumbered to DKA BB10 12	Ambarawa Railway Museum	1,067 mm (3 ft 6 in) gauge
3160	1908	0-6-0T	NIS Class 250	NIS 259, later renumbered to DKA C18 01	Ambarawa Railway Museum	1,067 mm (3 ft 6 in) gauge
3356	1909	2-6-2T	NSB type XXVIII	Urskog–Hølandbanen 4 Setskogen	Urskog–Hølandbanen heritage railway	750 mm (2 ft 5 1/2 in) gauge
3377	1910	0-4-4-0T (Meyer)	Saxon I TV	K.Sächs.Sts.E.B. 1394; later DR 98 001	Chemnitz Industrial Museum	
3387	1910	4-6-0	Saxon XII H2	K.Sächs.Sts.E.B. 656, later 3656, then DR 38 205	Saxon Railway Museum (SEM), Chemnitz	
3484	1911	0-4-0	SCS Class 100	SCS 110, later renumbered to DKA B52 10	Ambarawa Railway Museum	1,067 mm (3 ft 6 in) gauge
3477	1911	2-6-2T	Saxon XIV HT	K.Sächs.Sts.E.B. 1806, later DR 75 515	Saxon Railway Museum (SEM), Chemnitz	
3562	1912	0-4-0	SCS Class 100	SCS 112, later renumbered to DKA B52 12	Transportation Museum of Taman Mini Indonesia Indah	1,067 mm (3 ft 6 in) gauge
3782	1914	2-8-0	SS Class 900	SS 911, later renumbered to DKA D50 11	Transportation Museum of Taman Mini Indonesia Indah	1,067mm (3 ft 6 in) gauge
3836	1915	2-6-2T	Saxon XIV HT	K.Sächs.Sts.E.B. 1851, later DR 75 501	German Steam Locomotive Museum (DDM), Neuenmarkt	on loan from the Schwarzenberg Railway Museum
2276	1898	0-4-4-0T (Meyer)	Saxon IV K	K.Sächs.Sts.E.B. 128, later DR 99 535	Dresden Transport Museum (VMD)	750 mm (2 ft 5 1/2 in) gauge
3561	1912	0-4-4-0T (Meyer)	Saxon IV K	K.Sächs.Sts.E.B. 169, later DR 99 579	Saxon Narrow Gauge Museum (Sächsisches Schmalspurbahnmuseum, Rittersgrün)	750 mm (2 ft 5 1/2 in) gauge
3792	1914	0-4-4-0T (Meyer)	Saxon IV K	K.Sächs.Sts.E.B. 194, later DR 99 604	Radebeul Narrow Gauge Museum (Schmalspurbahnmuseum Radebeul, Radebeul)	750 mm (2 ft 5 1/2 in) gauge
4134	1920	2-8-2	SS Class 1500	SS 1506, later renumbered to DKA D51 06	Ambarawa Railway Museum	1,067 mm (3 ft 6 in) gauge
4523	1922	2-8-2	Saxon XX HV	Säch.Sts.E.B. 207, later DR 19 017, then 04 1017	Dresden Transport Museum (VMD)	
4561	1923	0-10-0T	Saxon XI HT	DR 94 2105	Schwarzenberg Railway Museum	
4623	1924	2-6-2T	NSB type XXIX	Urskog–Hølandbanen 5 Bjørkelangen	Norwegian University of Science & Technology, Trondheim	750 mm (2 ft 5 1/2 in) gauge
4658	1925	2-6-2T	NSB type XXIX	Urskog–Hølandbanen 6 Høland	Urskog–Hølandbanen heritage railway	750 mm (2 ft 5 1/2 in) gauge
4670	1927	0-10-0T	Saxon VI K	DRG 99 713	Sächsische Dampfeisenbahngesellschaft (SDG)	750 mm (2 ft 5 1/2 in) gauge
4672	1927	0-10-0T	Saxon VI K	DRG 99 715	z. Zt. Preßnitztalbahn	750 mm (2 ft 5 1/2 in) gauge
4673	1927	0-10-0T	Saxon VI K	DRG 99 716	Öchsle	750 mm (2 ft 5 1/2 in) gauge
4678	1928	2-10-2T	DRG Class 99.73–76	DRG 99 731	Sächsisch-Oberlausitzer Eisenbahngesellschaft (SOEG)	750 mm (2 ft 5 1/2 in) gauge
4681	1928	2-10-2T	DRG Class 99.73–76	DRG 99 734	Sächsische Dampfeisenbahngesellschaft (SDG)	750 mm (2 ft 5 1/2 in) gauge
4682	1928	2-10-2T	DRG Class 99.73–76	DRG 99 735	Sächsisch-Oberlausitzer Eisenbahngesellschaft (SOEG)	750 mm (2 ft 5 1/2 in) gauge
4691	1928	2-10-2T	DRG Class 99.73–76	DRG 99 741	Sächsische Dampfeisenbahngesellschaft (SDG)	750 mm (2 ft 5 1/2 in) gauge

=== Other products ===
- Textile machinery
- Machine tools

== Literature ==
- Richard Hartmann AG (Hrsg.): Lokomotiven. Ausgabe 1910. Selbstverlag, Chemnitz 1910 (Digitalisat)
- Richard Hartmann AG (Hrsg.): 1837–1912. Jubiläumsschrift aus Anlass des 75jährigen Bestehens der Sächsischen Maschinenfabrik vorm. Richard Hartmann Aktiengesellschaft. Selbstverlag, Chemnitz 1912
- Günther Reiche: Der Chemnitzer Maschinenbauer Richard Hartmann und seine Lokomotiven. Eine Faktensammlung. Oberbaum Verlag, Chemnitz 1998, ISBN 3-928254-56-1
- Günther Reiche: Richard Hartmann. 8. November 1809 - 16. Dezember 1878. Vom Zeugschmied zum sächsischen Lokomotivenkönig. Reihe Chemnitzer Lebensbilder Band 6, Verlag Heimatland Sachsen, Chemnitz 2007, ISBN 3-910186-60-2
- Sächsische Textilmaschinenfabrik vormals Richard Hartmann Aktiengesellschaft (Hrsg.): 100 Jahre Hartmann Textilmaschinenbau im Jahre 1937. Zur Hundertjahrfeier des Unternehmens. VDI-Verlag, Berlin 1937
- Wolfgang Uhlemann: 2008 - Vier Jubiläen der Firma Rich. Hartmann/Sächsische Maschinenfabrik, vorm. Rich. Hartmann AG, Chemnitz. in: Erzgebirgische Heimatblätter, Heft 2/2008, S. 5–8
- VEB ERMAFA Karl-Marx-Stadt (Hrsg.): 150 Jahre Maschinenbau 1837 - 1987. Karl-Marx-Stadt 1987
