= Saxon XIV HT =

Saxon Class XIV HT DRG/DR Class 75.5
Manufacturer:	Sächsische Maschinenfabrik, Chemnitz		
Numbering:	1801–1850; 75 511–550	1851–1855; 75 501–505	1856–1906; 75 551–588
Built:	1911–1915	1915	1917/18, 1921
Retired:	by 1970		
Quantity:	50	5	51
Wheel arrangement:	2-6-2T		
Axle arrangement:	1′C1′ h2t		
Track gauge:	1,435 mm (4 ft 8 1/2 in)		
Length over buffers:	12,415 mm (40 ft 8 3/4 in)		
Fixed wheelbase:	2,800 mm (9 ft 2 1/4 in)		
Overall wheelbase:	8,700 mm (28 ft 6 1/2 in)		
Empty weight:	60.1 t	62.7 t	64.2 t
Service weight:	76.7 t	79.4 t	82.2 t
Adhesive weight:	47.7 t	48.8 t	49.5 t
Axle load:	15.9 t	16.3 t	16.5 t
Top speed:	75 km/h (47 mph)		
Indicated Power:	990 PS (730 kW; 980 hp)		
Driving wheel diameter:	1,590 mm (5 ft 2 5/8 in)		
Carrying wheel diameter:	1,065 mm (3 ft 5 7/8 in)		
Valve gear:	Walschaerts (Heusinger)		
No. of cylinders:	2		
Cylinder bore:	550 mm (21 5/8 in)		
Piston stroke:	600 mm (23 5/8 in)		
Boiler overpressure:	12 kg/cm^{2} (1,180 kPa; 171 psi)		
No. of heating tubes:	132		
Heating tube length:	4,000 mm (13 ft 1 1/2 in)		
Grate area:	2.30 m^{2} (24.8 sq ft)		
Radiative heating area:	11.8 m^{2} (127 sq ft)		
Tube heating area:	110.5 m^{2} (1,189 sq ft)	119.8 m^{2} (1,290 sq ft)	110.5 m^{2} (1,189 sq ft)
Superheater area:	36.2 m^{2} (390 sq ft)	65.0 m^{2} (700 sq ft)	36.2 m^{2} (390 sq ft)
Evaporative heating area:	122.3 m^{2} (1,316 sq ft)	131.58 m^{2} (1,416.3 sq ft)	122.3 m^{2} (1,316 sq ft)
Water capacity:	8.0 m^{3} (1,800 imp gal)	8.0 m^{3} (1,800 imp gal)	9.0 m^{3} (2,000 imp gal)
Coal capacity:	2.5 t	2.5 t	2.8 t
Brakes:	Westinghouse compressed-air brake		

The Saxon Class XIV $\textstyle \mathfrak{H}$T locomotives were six-coupled tank engines operated by the Royal Saxon State Railways for mixed duties on main and branch lines. In 1925, the Deutsche Reichsbahn grouped them into their DRG Class 75.5.

== History ==
As a successor to the four-coupled Saxon Class IV T the Sächsische Maschinenfabrik in Chemnitz developed a six-coupled tank locomotive. This new engine was primarily intended to be used in charge of suburban trains in the big conurbations.

From 1911 to 1921, 106 of these locomotives, built in three series, were placed in service by the Royal Saxon State Railways. At the time of its appearance, the Saxon XIV HT was the heaviest 2-6-2 in central Europe. Not only were these locomotives used to haul suburban services, but in the end they were put in charge of all types of passenger trains on branch and main lines in Saxony's central mountains.

After World War I some of the locomotives had to be handed over to Poland, Belgium and France as reparations in accordance with the terms of the Versailles Treaty. As a result, in 1920, the newly founded Deutsche Reichsbahn could only muster 83 locomotives of this class into its fleet, which they grouped in 1925 into their Class 75.5.

The locomotives left in Poland later went into the Polish State Railway, PKP, and were given numbers OKl101-01 to 11. The Belgian État-Belge gave their four confiscated machines the numbers 9670, 9674, 9676 and 9686. A further eight locomotives ended up in the Chemins de Fer de l'État under the numbers 32-916 to 32-923.

After the end of World War II 88 locomotives went into the Deutsche Reichsbahn (GDR) in East Germany. Amongst them were several engines that had been handed over to Poland and France in 1918. In 1968, there were still 25 machines in working condition, but they were retired soon thereafter.

Two locomotives have been preserved: number 75 501 by the German Steam Locomotive Museum at Neuenmarkt-Wirsberg, which was loaned to the Schwarzenberg railway museum in 2002 and number 75 515 by the Saxon Railway Museum in Chemnitz-Hilbersdorf, which was badly damaged in a shunting accident on 14 June 1983 at Karl-Marx-Stadt Hauptbahnhof.

== Technical features ==
The locomotives had a boiler barrel, made from two shells, as well as two steam domes, which were linked by an internal connecting pipe. The boiler feed was achieved using injectors, but from locomotive number 1856 they were given Knorr feed pumps with a preheater located transversely under the boiler. Later the preheater was positioned on the left hand side next to the chimney on all locomotives, which gave them their characteristic appearance. Schmidt superheaters were used.

The steam engine itself comprised a two-cylinder engine with simple steam expansion and Heusinger valve gear. The engine drove the second (middle) coupled axle.

The driving axles were fixed rigidly into the locomotive frame. To improve curve running the wheel flanges of the driving wheels were reduced. The carrying axles were designed as Adams axles and had leaf return springs.

A Westinghouse compressed-air brake was installed as the locomotive brake. The air pump was originally on the left of the smokebox; later it was moved to the right.

Nine cubic metres of water were carried in two side tanks and a well tank located in the frame. The coal bunker was behind the driver's cab.

For branch line duties, all machines were equipped with a steam-operated bell.

== See also ==
- Royal Saxon State Railways
- List of Saxon locomotives and railbuses
