= Saxon XII H2 =

Saxon XII H2 DRG Class 38.2-3
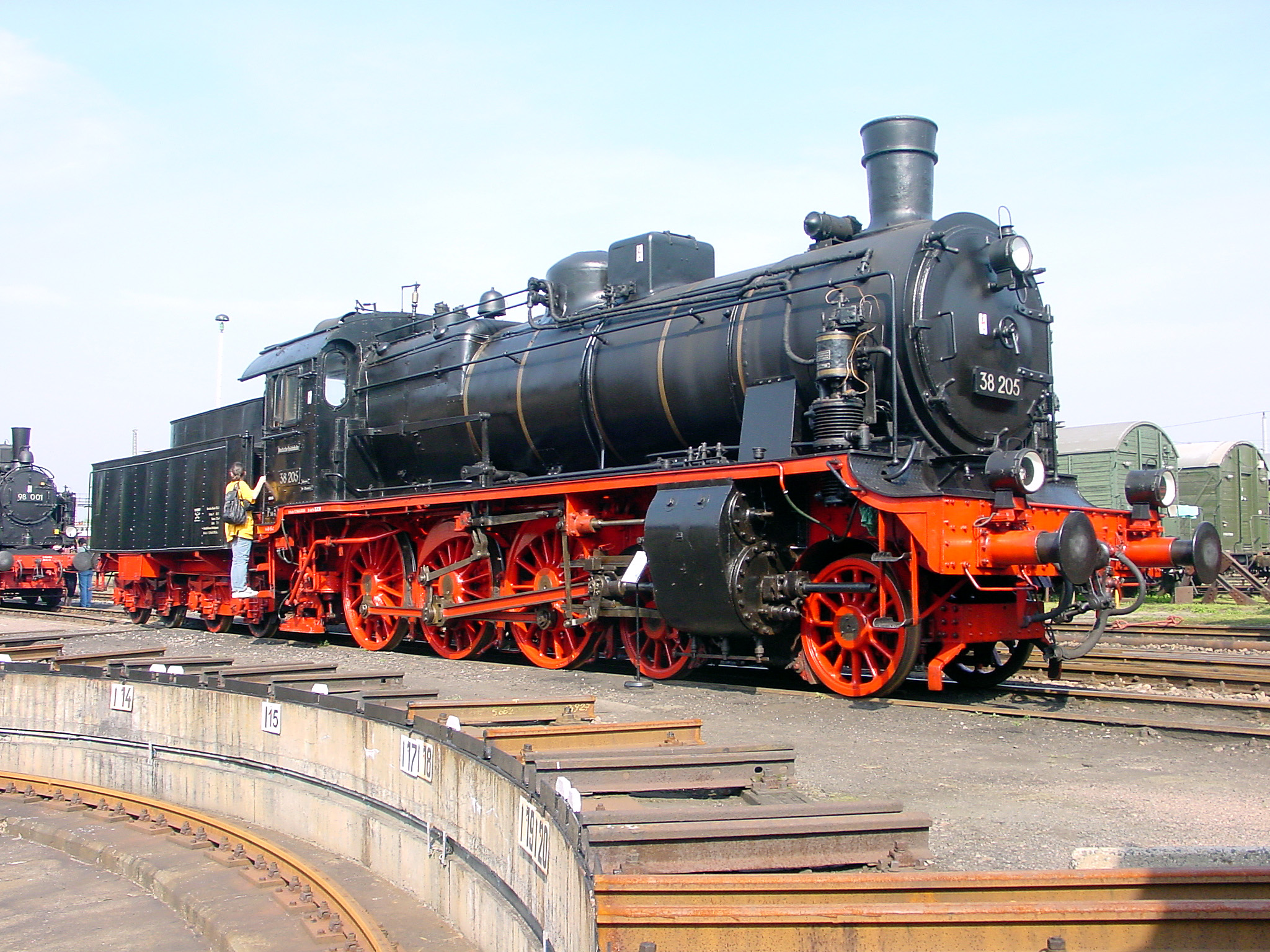
- Steam locomotive 38 205 (sä XII H2) at Chemnitz-Hilbersdorf Railway Museum on 24 August 2002
Type and origin
- Builder: Hartmann
- Total produced: 169
Specifications
- Configuration
  - Whyte: 4-6-0
  - UIC: 2′C h2
- Gauge: 1,435 mm (4 ft 8 1/2 in) standard gauge
- Driver dia.: 1,590 mm (5 ft 2 5/8 in)
- Carrying wheel diameter: 1,065 mm (3 ft 5 7/8 in)
- Length
  - Over beams: 18,971 mm (62 ft 3 in)
- Axle load: 15.7 tonnes 15.5 long tons; 17.3 short tons
- Adhesive weight: 47.1 tonnes 46.4 long tons; 51.9 short tons
- Service weight: 73.3 tonnes 72.1 long tons; 80.8 short tons
- Boiler pressure: 13 kg/cm^{2} (1.27 MPa; 185 psi)
- Heating surface
  - Firebox: 2.83 m^{2} (30.5 sq ft)
  - Evaporative: 159.57 m^{2} (1,717.6 sq ft)
- Superheater
  - Heating area: 43.20 m^{2} (465.0 sq ft)
- Cylinder size: 550 mm (21.654 in)
- Piston stroke: 600 mm (23.622 in)
Performance figures
- Maximum speed: 90 km/h (56 mph)
- Indicated power: 1,320 PS (970 kW; 1,300 hp)

The Saxon Class XII H2 steam locomotives (also nicknamed Sächsischer Rollwagen or 'Saxon rollers') were bought by the Royal Saxon State Railways (Königlich Sächsische Staatseisenbahnen) specifically for the mountainous areas of Saxony. They were built by Hartmann between 1910 and 1927 in Chemnitz. The design of this passenger train locomotive was carried out in parallel with that of the express train classes, the Saxon X H1 and Saxon XII H. A total of 159 examples of this powerful locomotive were built by 1922.

The Deutsche Reichsbahn took over 124 of these engines as the DRG Class 38.2-3 (the others had been lost during the First World War or had to be given away as reparations) and gave them operating numbers 38 201 to 38 324. In 1927, ten more were built. These were given operating numbers 38 325 to 38 334.

During the Second World War 15 of the Class XII H2s that had been given to France returned to Germany and were stationed again in the Reichsbahn division of Dresden. From 1938, however, the majority of these locomotives were working out of locomotive depots (Bahnbetriebswerken or Bw) in the Sudetenland. As a result, after the war only about a half the original fleet of these engines was left in Germany. Five of the locomotives returned from France went into the East German Deutsche Reichsbahn where they were allocated operating numbers 38 204 and 38 351 to 38 354. The last ones had been withdrawn by 1971.

Even the surviving museum locomotive, number 38 205 is currently not working. This engine is owned by the DB Museum at Nuremberg and has been loaned to the Saxon Railway Museum in Chemnitz-Hilbersdorf.

The first 15 vehicles were originally equipped with Saxon sä 2'2' T 16 tenders. Later they ran with Saxon sä 2'2' T 21 tenders as did all the subsequent locomotives.

== See also ==
- Royal Saxon State Railways
- List of Saxon locomotives and railbuses
