= Schnaittenbach =

- Town
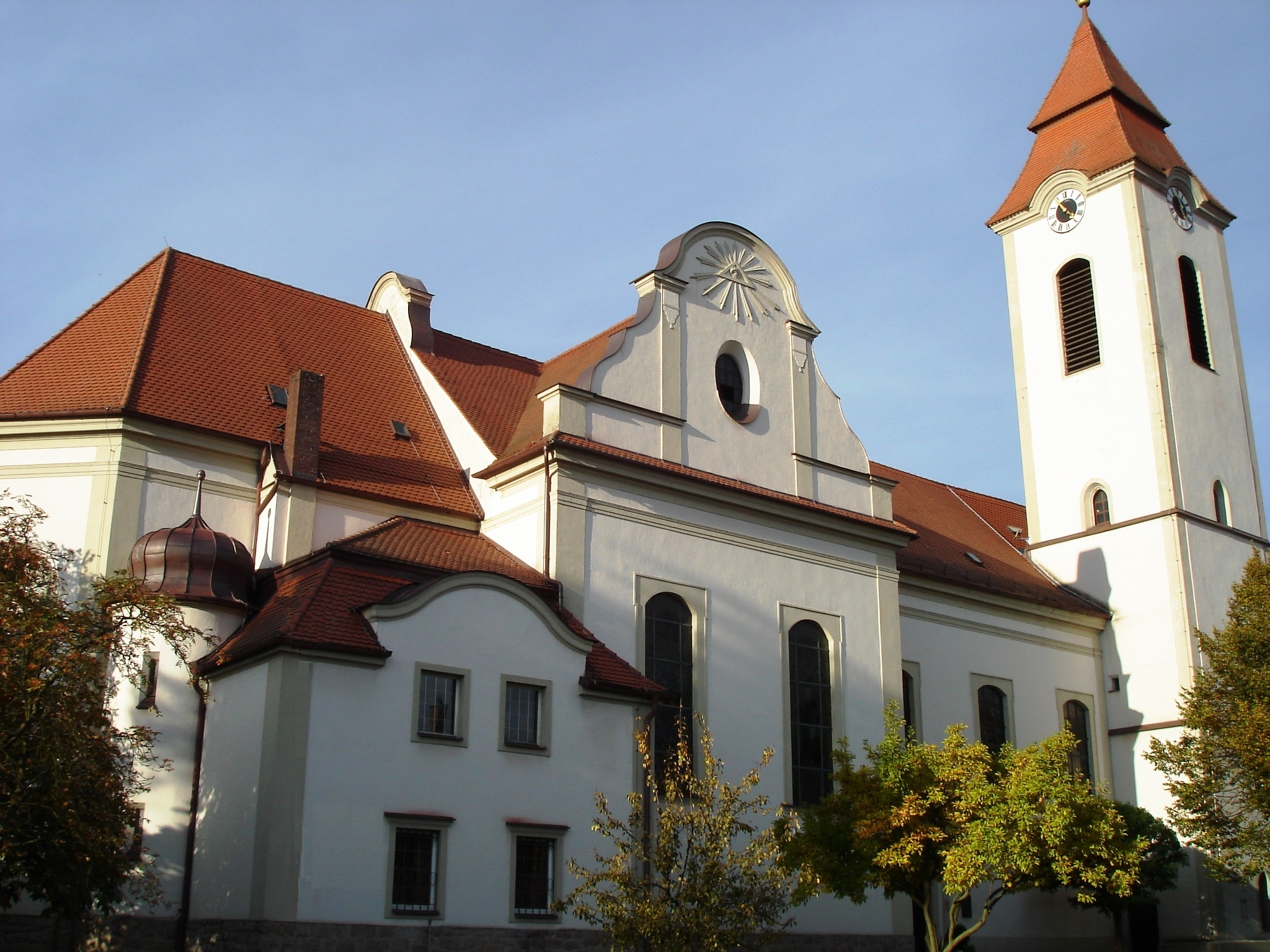
- Church of Saint Vitus

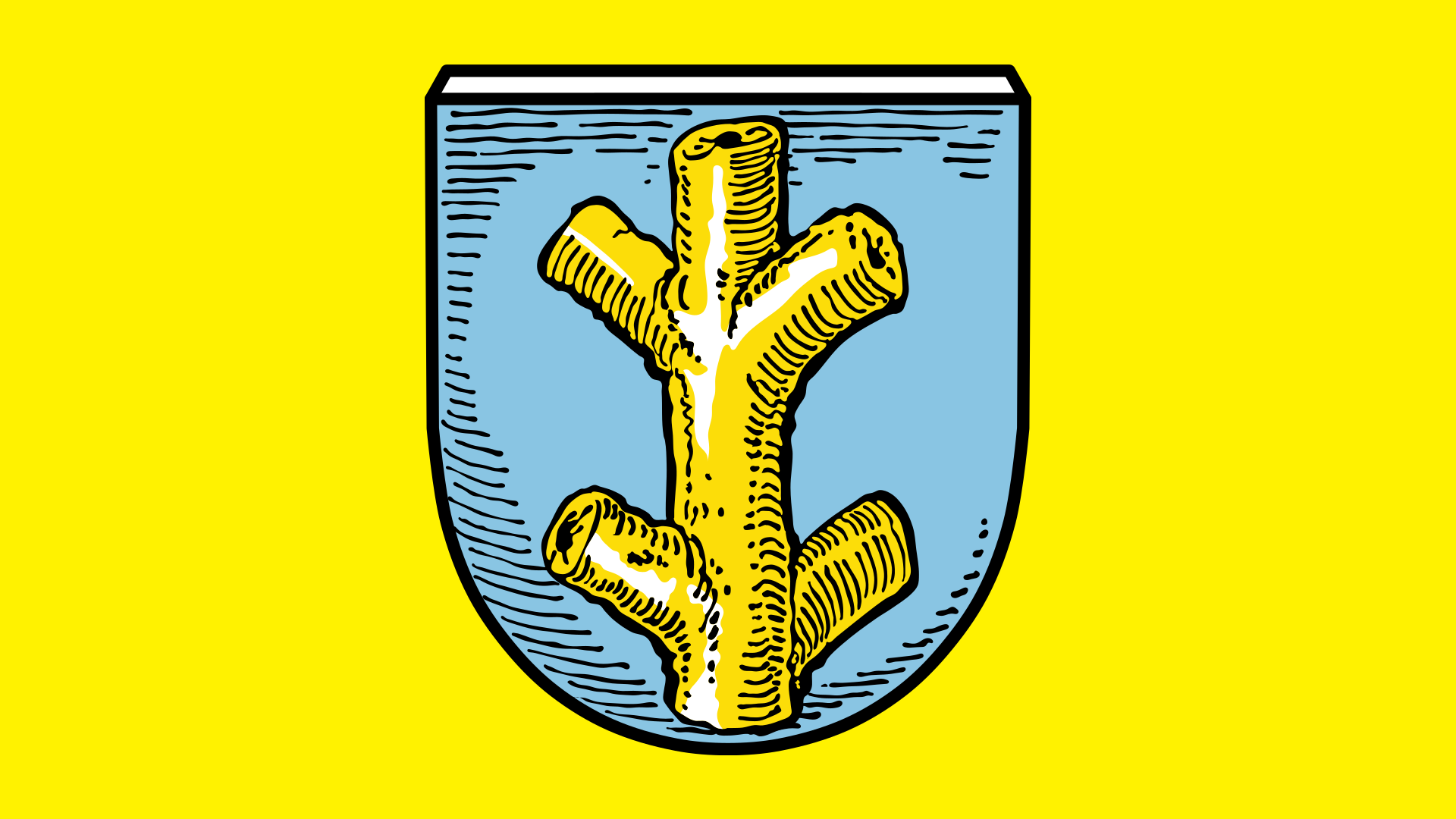
- Flag Coat of arms

- Location of Schnaittenbach within Amberg-Sulzbach district
- Interactive map of Schnaittenbach
- Location within Germany Location within Bavaria
- Coordinates: 49°32′N 12°1′E
- Country: Germany
- State: Bavaria
- Admin. region: Oberpfalz
- District: Amberg-Sulzbach
- Subdivisions: 10 Stadtteile

Government
  - Mayor (2020–26): Marcus Eichenmüller (CSU)

Area
  - Total: 63.41 km^{2} (24.48 sq mi)
- Elevation: 403 m (1,322 ft)

Population (2025-12-31)
  - Total: 4,253
  - Density: 67.07/km^{2} (173.7/sq mi)
- Time zone: UTC+01:00 (CET)
  - Summer (DST): UTC+02:00 (CEST)
- Postal codes: 92253
- Dialling codes: 09622
- Vehicle registration: AS
- Website: www.schnaittenbach.de

Schnaittenbach (German pronunciation: [ˈʃnaɪtn̩ˌbax]) is a town in the Amberg-Sulzbach district, in Bavaria, Germany. It is situated 16 km northeast of Amberg.

== Geography ==
Apart from the town Schnaittenbach the municipality consists of the following villages:

- Demenricht
- Döswitz
- Forst
- Götzendorf
- Haidhof
- Haidmühle
- Holzhammer
- Kemnath a.Buchberg
- Mertenberg
- Neuersdorf
- Seblasmühle
- Sitzambuch
- Tradlmühle
- Trichenricht
- Ziegelhütte

== Twin towns – sister cities ==
Schnaittenbach is member of the so-called "Kaolinstädtepartnerschaft". It connects cities, which are connected to the mineral Kaolin. The partnership was established in November 2004. Aside Schnaittenbach the members of this partnership are the bavarian cities Tirschenreuth und Hirschau, from Saxony Königswartha, Sornzig-Ablaß and the city Mügeln, Nová Role from Czech Republic and Nowogrodziec from Poland.

Beside the Kaolinstädtepartnerschaft Schnaittenbach is twinned with Buchberg, Switzerland.

== Notable people ==
- Bernhard Zimniok (born 1953), politician
