= Bernhard Zimniok =

German politician (born 1953)

Bernhard Zimniok MEP
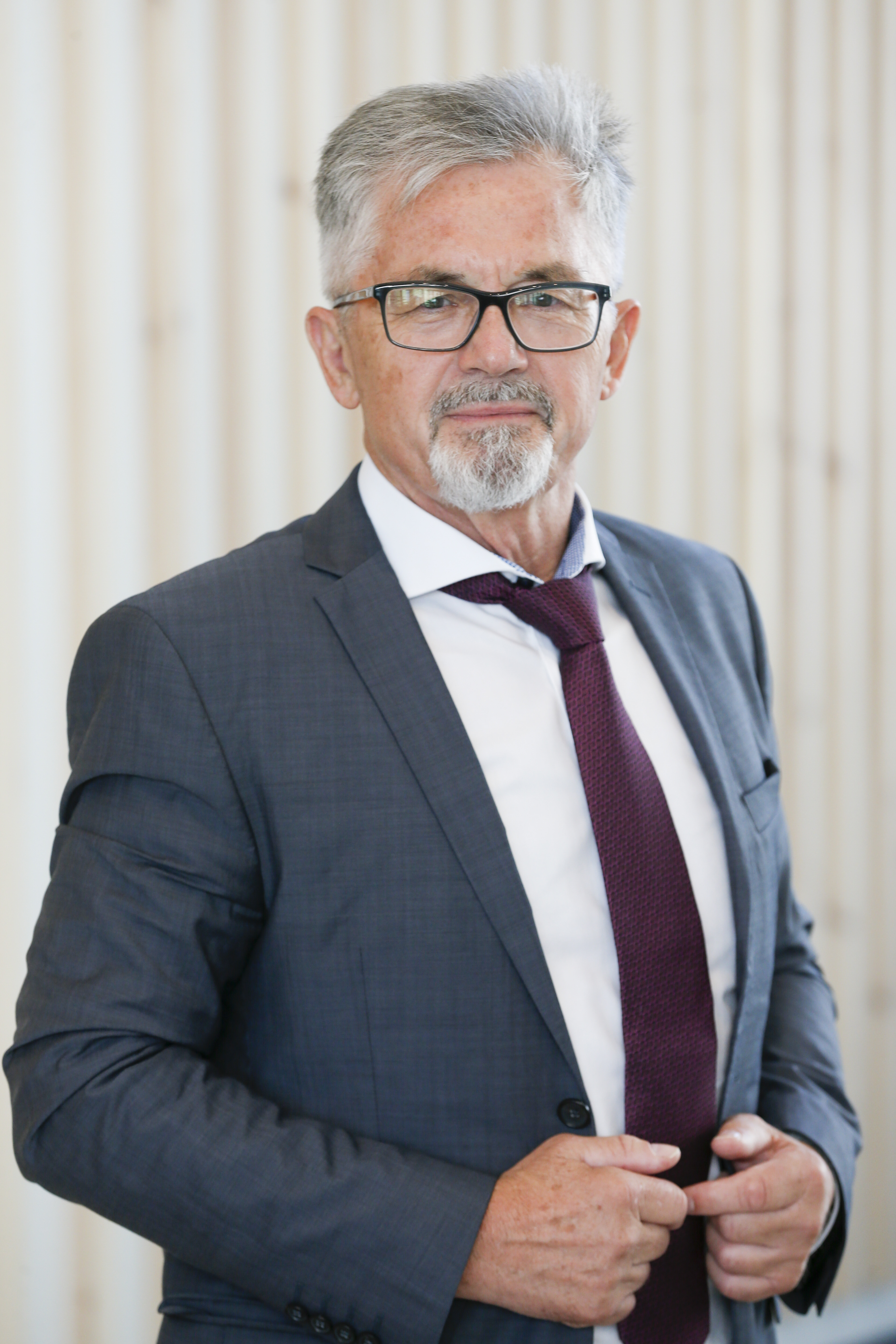

Member of the European Parliament for Germany
- Incumbent
- Assumed office 2 July 2019

Personal details
- Born: Schnaittenbach
- Party: Alternative for Germany
- Profession: Soldier, politician

Military service
- Allegiance: Germany
- Branch/service: Bundeswehr
- Rank: Lieutenant colonel
- Unit: Airborne division

Bernhard Zimniok (born 21 June 1953 in Schnaittenbach) is a German politician and former Bundeswehr colonel who is serving as an Alternative for Germany Member of the European Parliament.

Zimniok served in the German army for fifteen years as part of the airborne division and attained the rank of lieutenant colonel. He also served as part of the diplomatic protection unit at the German embassies in Damascus and Islamabad, and was a security advisor in Africa and the Middle East. He first joined the AfD party in 2015 in response to the refugee crisis. In 2019, he was elected to the European Parliament where he sits as part of the Identity and Democracy group. He also serves on the Committee of Foreign Affairs.
