= Königswartha =

Königswartha Rakecy
- Municipality
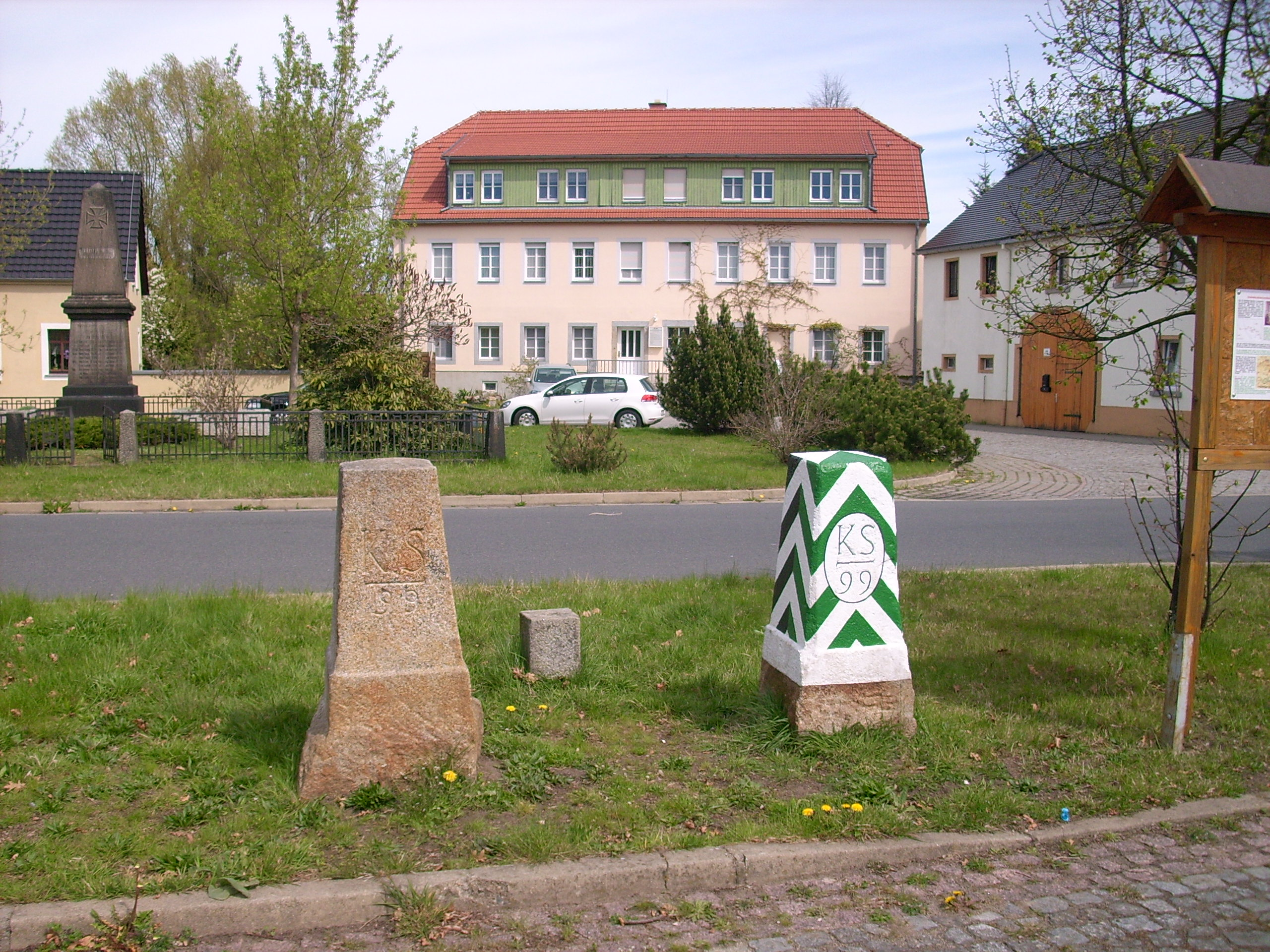

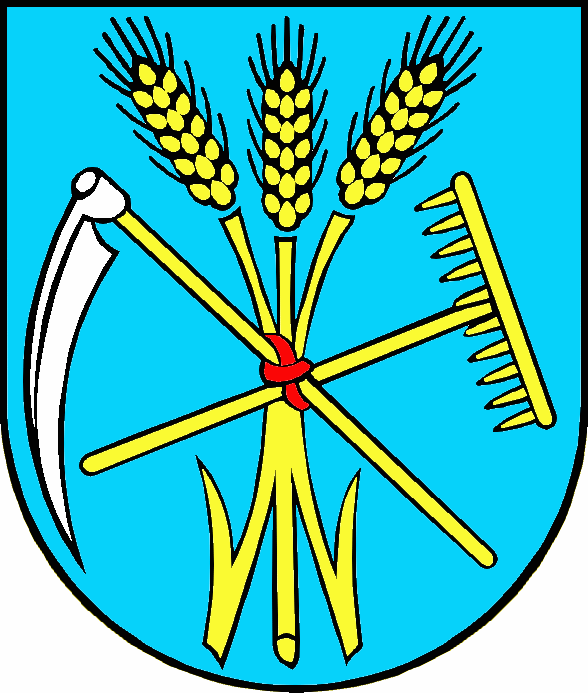
- Coat of arms

- Location of Königswartha within Bautzen district
- Interactive map of Königswartha
- Location within Germany Location within Saxony
- Coordinates: 51°19′N 14°20′E
- Country: Germany
- State: Saxony
- District: Bautzen

Government
  - Mayor (2022–29): Swen Nowotny (CDU)

Area
  - Total: 47.04 km^{2} (18.16 sq mi)
- Elevation: 141 m (463 ft)

Population (2025-12-31)
  - Total: 3,305
  - Density: 70.26/km^{2} (182.0/sq mi)
- Time zone: UTC+01:00 (CET)
  - Summer (DST): UTC+02:00 (CEST)
- Postal codes: 02699
- Dialling codes: 035931
- Vehicle registration: BZ, BIW, HY, KM
- Website: www.koenigswartha.net

Königswartha, in Sorbian Rakecy (pronounced [ˈʁakɛtsɨ]), is a municipality in the east of Saxony, Germany. It belongs to the district of Bautzen and lies 20 km north of the eponymous city.

The municipality is part of the recognized Sorbian settlement area in Saxony. Upper Sorbian has an official status next to German, all villages bear names in both languages.

"Rakecy" means "men of the crab" (rak being Sorbian for "crab"). The village was mentioned the first time in 1350.

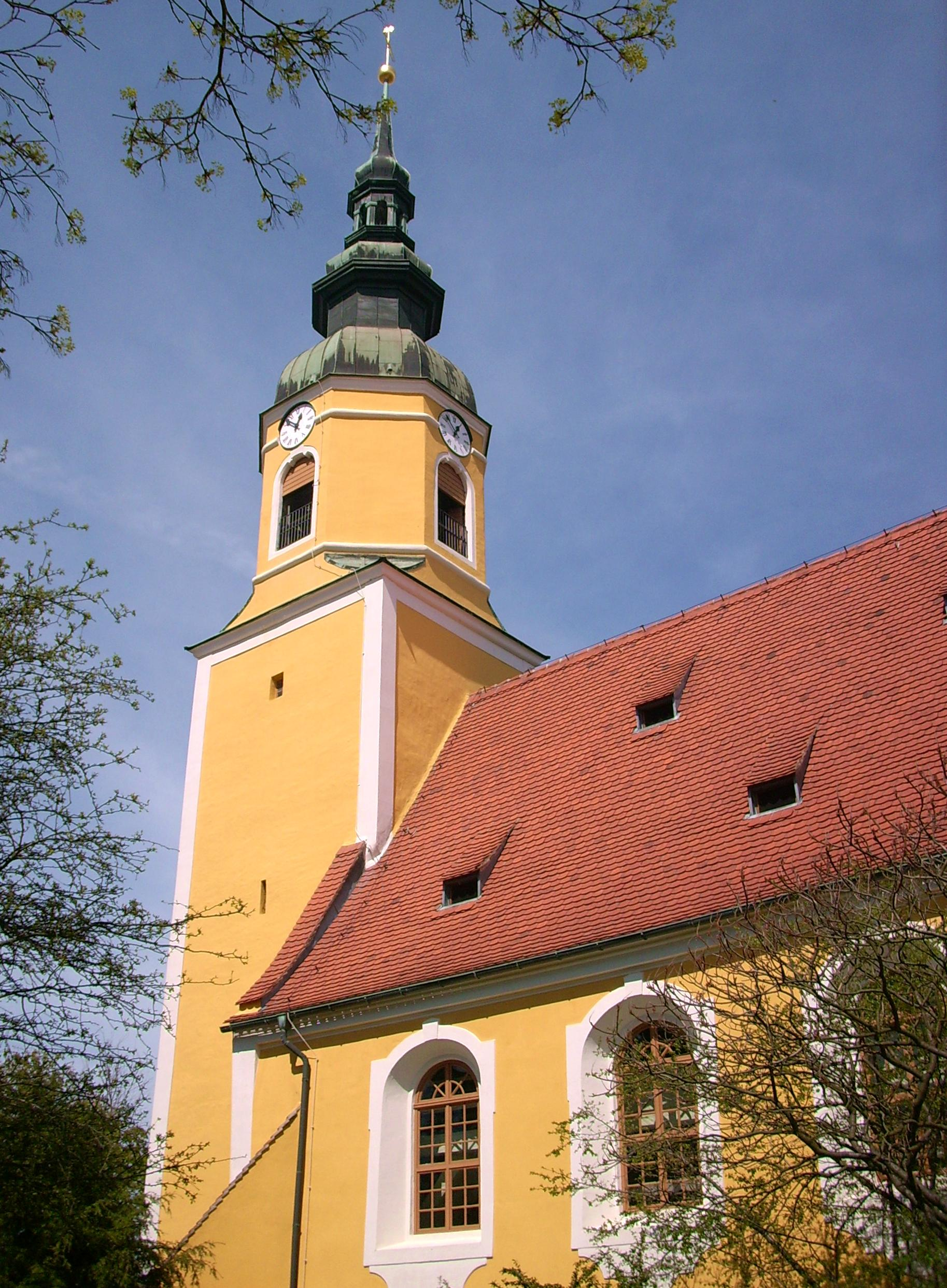
Church in Königswartha

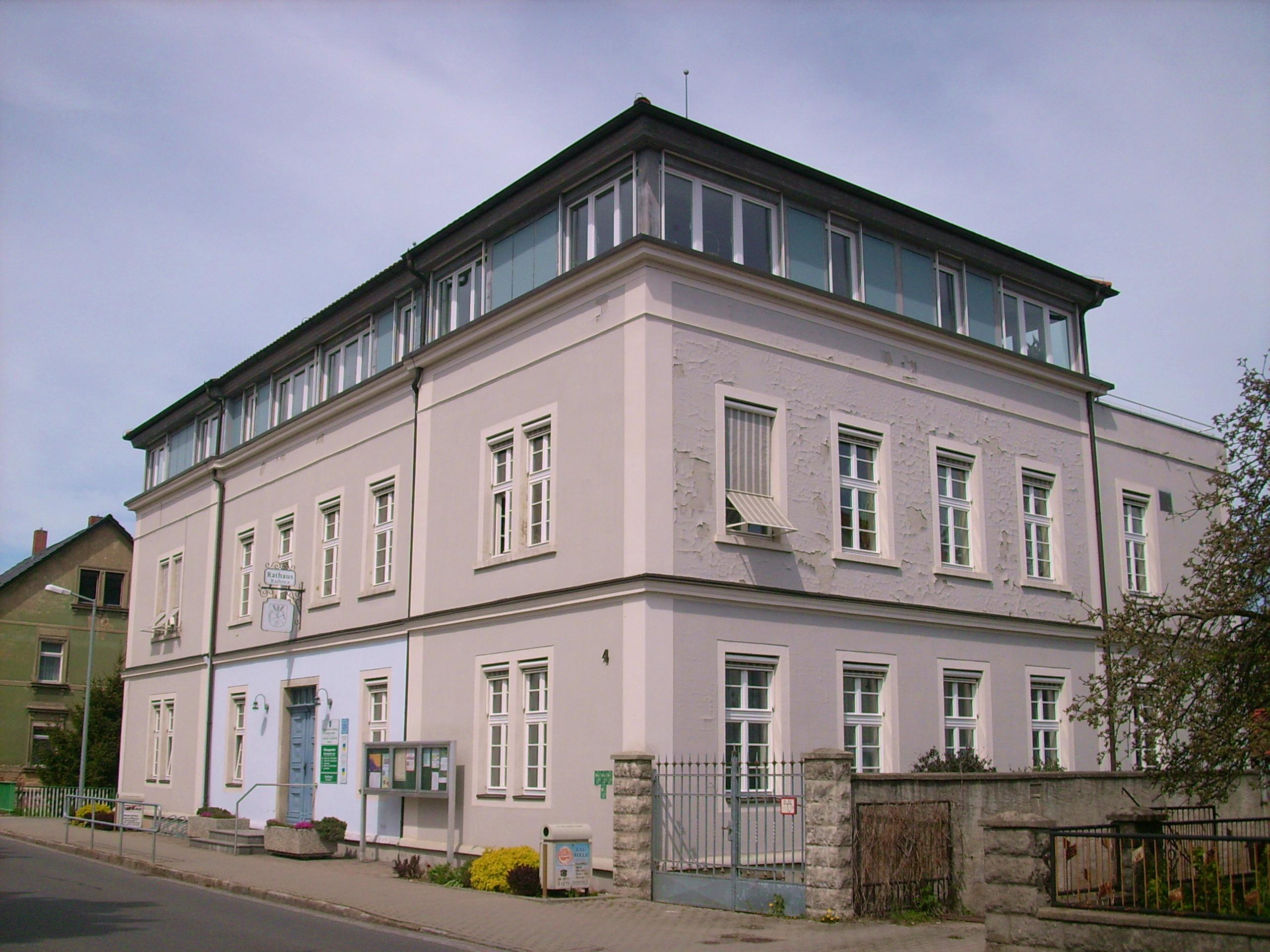
Town hall

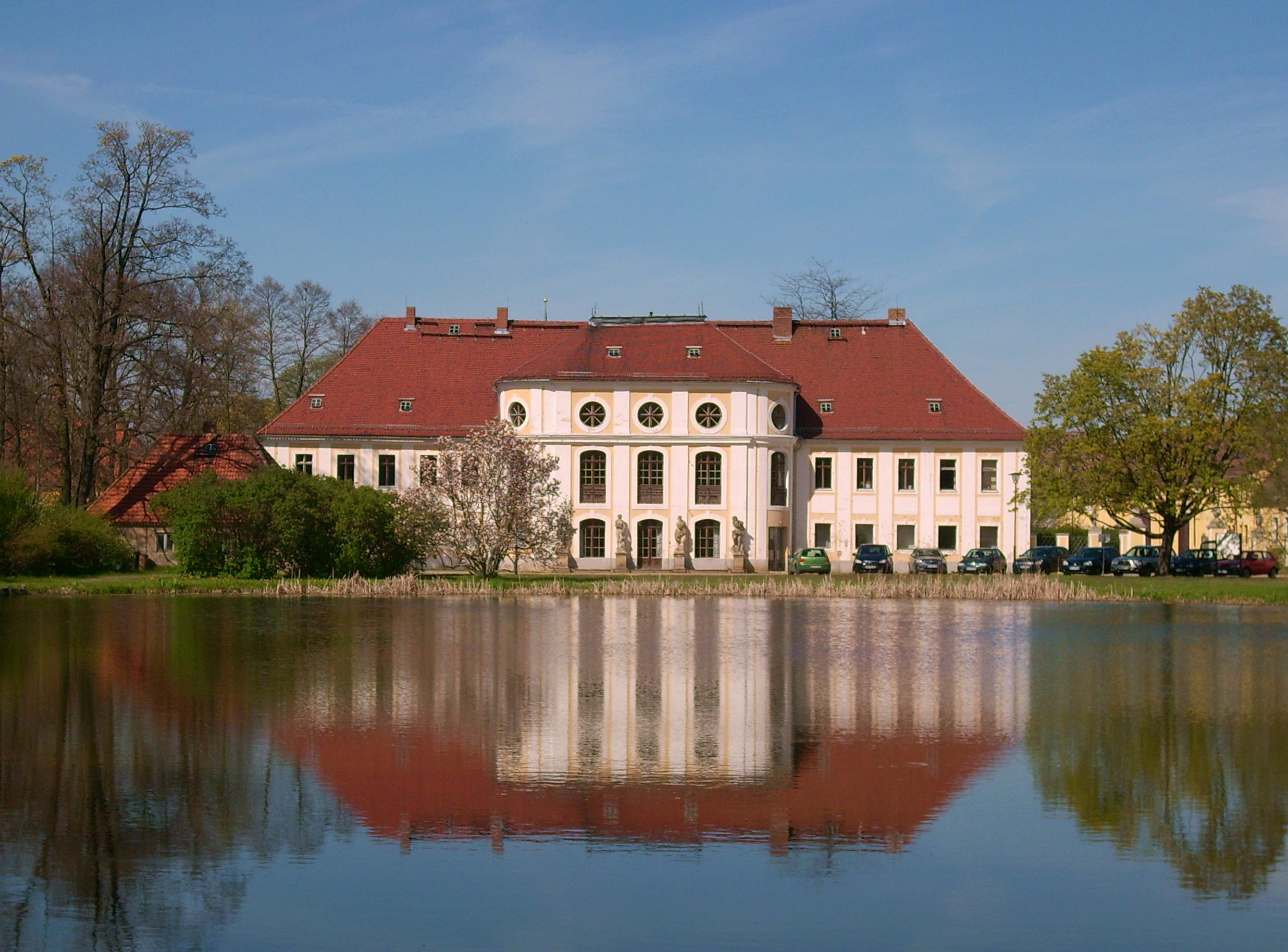
Castle of Königswartha

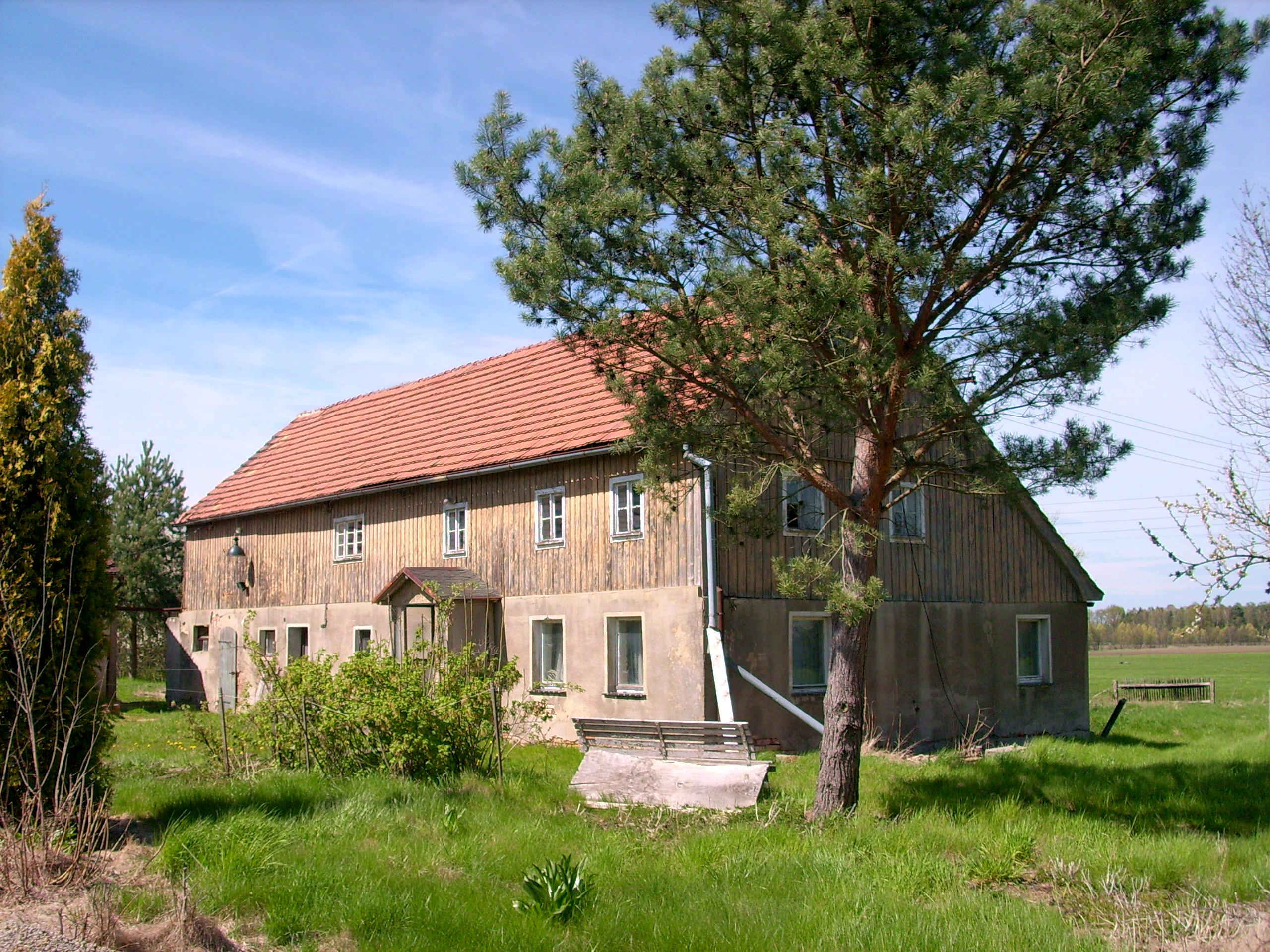
Old house in Königswartha

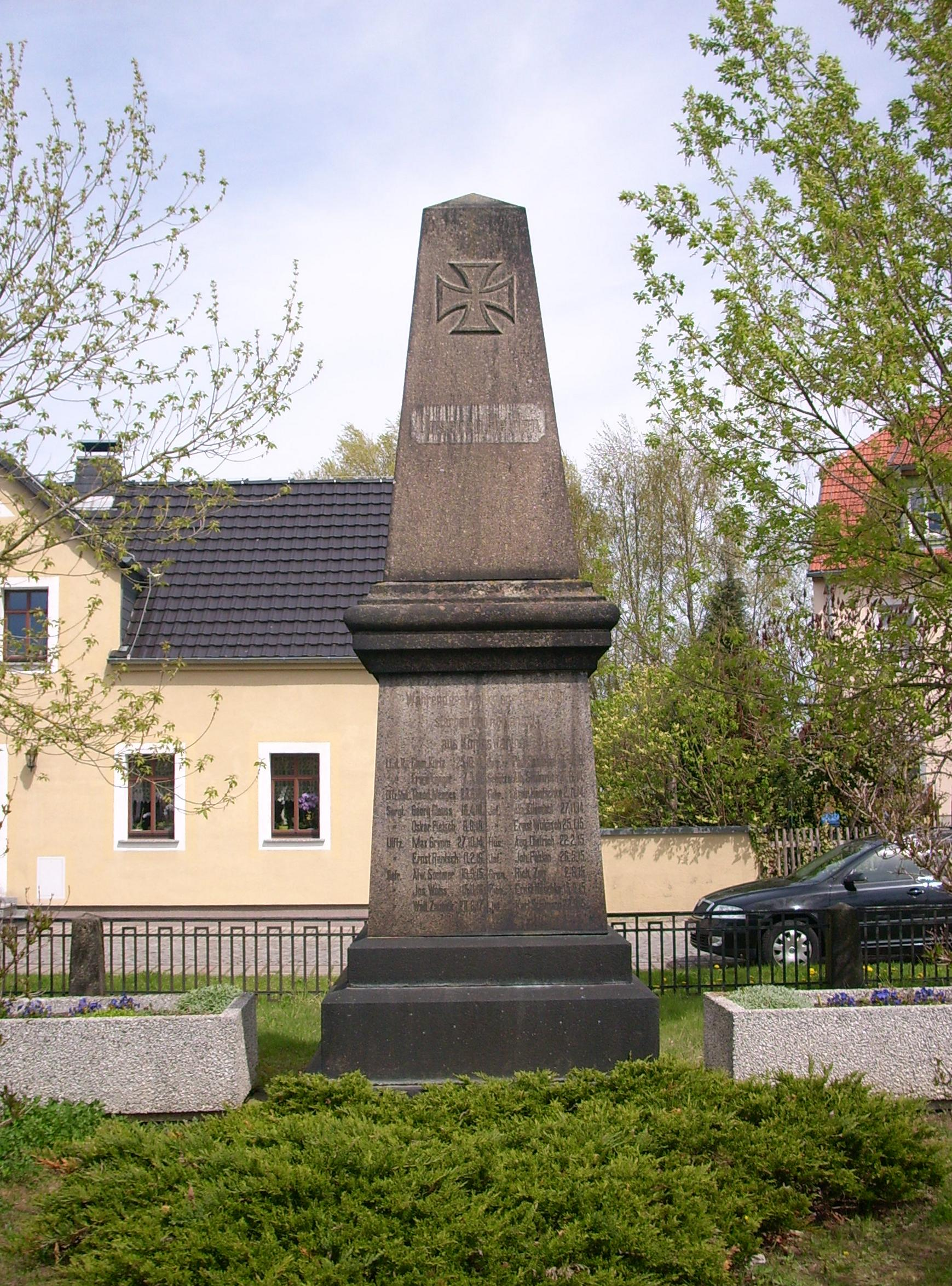
War memorial

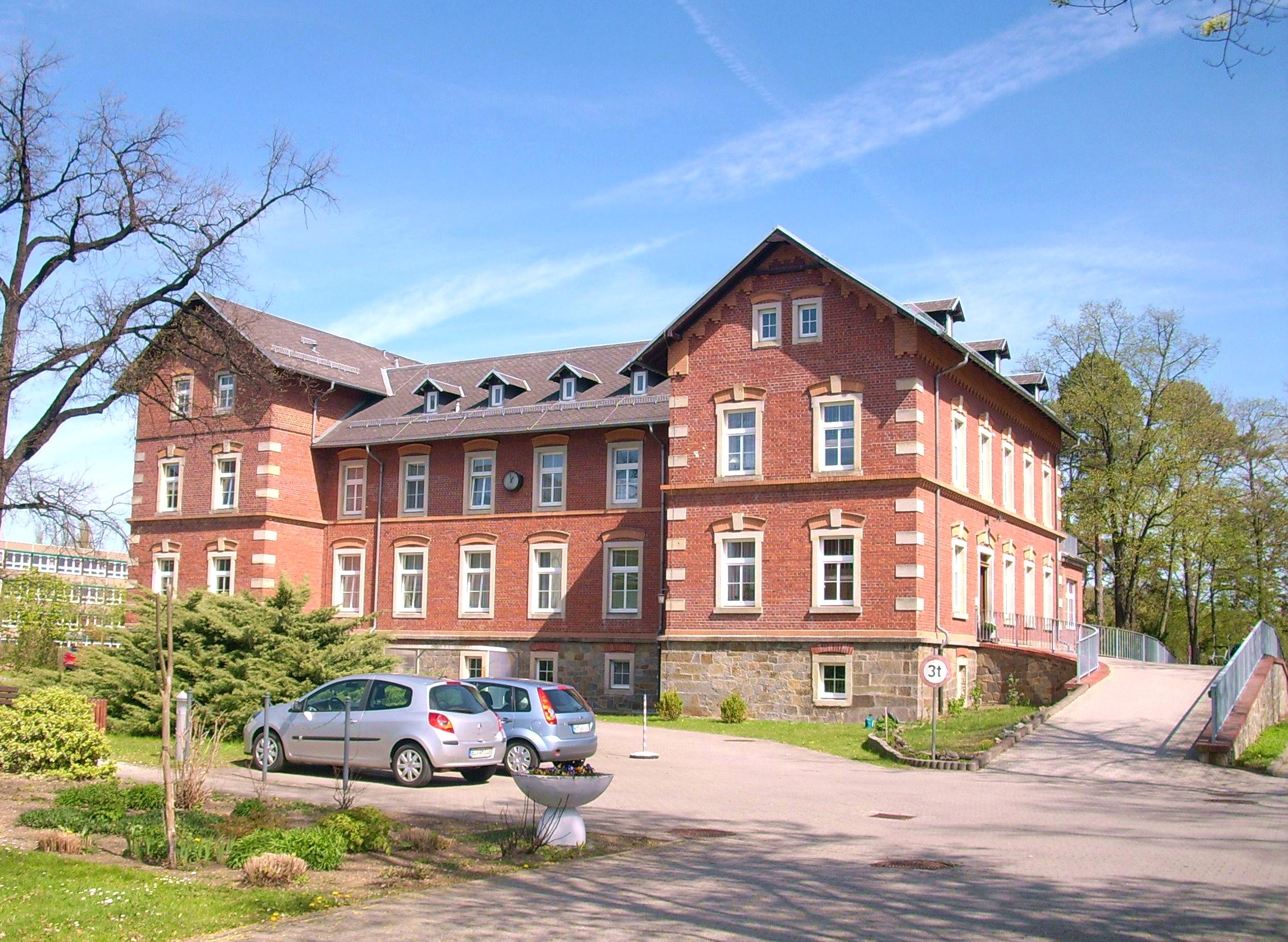
Rest home

== Geography ==
The municipality is situated in the Upper Lusatian flatland. The village stretches along the river Schwarzwasser.

== Villages ==
Several villages belong to the municipality:

- Caminau (Kamjenej)
- Commerau (Komorow)
- Entenschenke (Kača Korčma)
- Eutrich (Jitk)
- Johnsdorf (Jeńšecy)
- Königswartha (Rakecy)
- Neudorf (Nowa Wjes)
- Niesendorf (Niža Wjes)
- Oppitz (Psowje)
- Truppen (Trupin)
- Wartha (Stróža)

== Twin towns – sister cities ==
Königswartha is member of the so called "Kaolinstädtepartnerschaft". It connects cities, which are connected to the mineral Kaolin. The partnership was established in November 2004. Aside Königswartha the members of this partnership are the bavarian cities Schnaittenbach, Tirschenreuth and Hirschau, from Saxony Sornzig-Ablaß and the city Mügeln, Nová Role from Czech Republic and Nowogrodziec from Poland.
