= List of Palatine locomotives and railbuses =

Arms of the Palatinate

This list gives an overview of the locomotives and railbuses of the Palatinate Railway (Pfalzbahn) and the Palatine network of the Royal Bavarian State Railways (Königlich Bayerische Staats-Eisenbahnen).

The Palatinate (Pfalz) is a region in south-western Germany that became part of the Kingdom of Bavaria in 1816, even though it was geographically separate. Its union with Bavaria was not dissolved until the reorganisation of German states after World War II during the occupation of Germany. The Palatinate Railway was a private railway concern formed on 1 January 1870. It was nationalised on 1 January 1909, with its 870 kilometres of track, and went into the Royal Bavarian State Railways.

== Overview ==
Palatine locomotives were numbered in sequence as well as given names. On being retired, the numbers freed up were reused for newly delivered locomotives. Pontoon locomotives(Schiffsbrückenlokomotiven), as well as engines employed on secondary (Sekundärbahn) and narrow gauge lines used their own numbering scheme with Roman numerals.

The allocation of names was stopped in 1904, because the purchase of the railway by the Bavarian state was approaching. Only four locomotives delivered after that were given names: three P 4s and an L 1. The names chosen were based mainly on towns, castles, rivers and mountains in the Palatinate. The use of names from myths from classical antiquity remained Episode. The special importance of express train locomotives was stressed by naming them after Bavarian monarchs, as well as important people in the Bavarian government and managers of the Palatinate Railway.

The introduction of a classification scheme was first achieved in the Palatinate Railway in 1898. Four main groups were created:

- P - Passenger and express train locomotives (Personen- und Schnellzuglokomotiven) (including tank engines used for these duties)
- G - Goods train locomotives (Güterzuglokomotiven)
- T - Tank locomotives (Tenderlokomotiven) for mixed duties
- L - Narrow gauge locomotives for branch lines (Tenderlokomotiven für Lokalbahnen)

An Arabic numeral followed the class letter to distinguish between the individual locomotive classes. A superscripted Roman numeral indicated a sub-class. The Palatine class designations were only used on paper and not written on the locomotives themselves.

On the transfer of the Palatine railway network to the Bavarian state railways in 1909 the Bavarian classification system was adopted for new locomotives. Older locomotives however kept their original designations. New locomotives built for the Palatine network continued to receive the range of numbers associated with the Palatinate Railway.

== Steam locomotives ==
=== Early locomotives for all types of train ===
Class	Railway number(s)	Quantity	Year(s) of Manufacture	Axle arrangement (UIC)	Remarks
None	1–8	8	1846–1847	1A1 n2	Passenger train locomotives, supplied by Kessler and Maffei
None	9–20	12	1846–1847	1B n2	Goods train locomotives, supplied by Kessler, Maffei and Saint-Léonard (4)
None	21	1	1851	1A1 n2	Passenger train locomotive KOENIG LUDWIG (King Ludwig), with Kessler-patented Bassgeigenkessel ('double-bass boiler')

None of the locomotives was given an operating number by the Deutsche Reichsbahn.

=== Passenger and express train locomotives ===
Class	Railway number(s)	DRG number(s)	Quantity	Year(s) of manufacture	Axle arrangement	Remarks
None	26–29		4	1853	2A n2	Fast stopping train (Eilzug) Crampton locomotives, supplied by Maffei (Nos. 26–29) and Esslingen (Nos. 36…63)
None	36–41, 46–49, 60–63		14	1855–1863	2A n2	Fast stopping train (Eilzug) Crampton locomotives, supplied by Maffei (Nos. 26–29) and Esslingen (Nos. 36…63)
P 1^{I}	88–95, 118–138	(34 7401–34 7402)	29	1870–1874	1B n2	
P 1^{II}	154–159	(34 7451)	6	1876	1B n2	
P 1^{III}	1^{(II)}…28^{(II)}, 160–161	(34 7411–34 7415)	9	1880–1884	1B n2	
P 2^{I}	26^{(II)}…63^{(II)}, 188–193	(35 7001–35 7020)	22	1891–1896	1′B1 n2	
P 3^{I}	93^{(II)}, 119^{(II)}, 221–230	14 101–14 105	12	1898–1904	2′B1′ n2i	Originally with inside cylinders; converted in 1913/14 to 2′B1′ n4v
P 3^{II}	263	(14 121)	1	1900	2′(a)B1′ n2v	Express train locomotive DR. v. CLEMM; Raisable 'dolly axle' (Vorspannachse) removed in 1902
P 4	133^{(II)}, 286–291, 302–305	(14 151–14 161)	11	1905–1906	2′B1′ h4v	Originally with Pielock superheater; removed after 1908 to 2′B1′ n4v due to unreliability
S 3/6	341–350	18 425–18 434	10	1914	2′C1′ h4v	So-called 'Palatine S 3/6' (Pfälzer S 3/6)

=== Goods train locomotives ===
Class	Railway number(s)	DRG number(s)	Quantity	Year(s) of manufacture	Axle arrangement (UIC)Axle	Remarks
G 1^{I}	22–25		4	1853	1B n2	Goods train locomotives, supplied by Maffei; Classification questionable because locomotives had already been retired when it was introduced
G 1^{II}	30–35, 42–45		10	1855	1B n2	Goods train locomotives, supplied by Maffei; Classification questionable because locomotives had already been retired when it was introduced
G 1^{III}	50–59, 64–69		16	1859–1867	1B n2	Goods train locomotives, supplied by Maffei; Classification questionable because locomotives had already been retired when it was introduced
G 1^{IV}	74–87		14	1869–1870	B n2	
G 2^{I}	6^{(II)}-8^{(II)}, 10^{(II)}-12^{(II)}, 96–117, 139–151	(53 7801–53 7821)	41	1871–1876	C n2	As Bavarian C III, yet without steamdome and Stephenson (not Alan) steering
G 2^{II}	9^{(II)}…25^{(II)}, 162–176	(53 7991–52 8009)	22	1884–1892	C n2	Similar to the Bavarian C IV Zw
G 3	30^{(II)}…72^{(II)}, 187–188	(55 7001–55 7006)	6	1887–1888	D n2	Bought from Sharp, Stewart & Co. from bankruptcy assets of the Swedish-Norwegian Railway, working in 1892; identical in design to the Baden VIII b
G 4^{I}	209–220, 231–245	55 7201–55 7215	27	1898–1899	D n2	
G 4^{II}	198–199	(55 7102)	2	1896	B′B n4v	Articulated Mallet locomotive; identical in design to the Bavarian BB I
G 4^{III}	200–201		2	1896	1′D n4v	Four-cylinder, Sondermann compound, converted to 1′D n2 in 1900; identical in design to the Bavarian E I
G 5	74^{(II)}…87^{(II)}, 292–301	55 5901–55 5922	24	1905–1906	D n2v	
G 3/3	1^{(III)}–4^{(III)}	(53 501–53 504)	4	1914	C n2v	Built by Maffei for Morocco, sold to the Palatine network in 1919

=== Tank locomotives ===
Class	Railway number(s)	DRG number(s)	Quantity	Year(s) of manufacture	Axle arrangement (UIC)	Remarks
None	70–73		4	1868	B n2t	Tank locomotives for the ramps of Ludwigshafen's Rhine bridge, supplied by Krauss
P 2^{II}	88^{(II)}…95^{(II)}, 260–262, 264–284	73 001–73 028	31	1900–1902	1′B2′ n2t	Copy of the Bavarian D XII
P 5	310–321	77 001–77 012	12	1908	1′C2′ n2t	
T 1	15^{(II)}…73^{(II)}, 177–186	88 7301–88 7321	31	1892–1897	B n2t	
T 2^{I}	I–VIII	(88 7001–88 7003)	8	1865–1874	B n2t	Locomotives for the pontoon bridges at Maximiliansau and Speyer; Nos. VII and VIII sold in 1879 to Baden (Baden I b)
T 2^{II}	VII^{(II)}–X		4	1883–1884	B n2t	Branch line (Sekundärbahn) engines for the Lautertalbahn, Kaiserslautern–Lauterecken
T 3	13^{(II)}…71^{(II)}, 202–208, 246–256	89 101–89 121	27	1889–1905	C n2t	
T 4^{I}	44^{(II)}…56^{(II)}, 194–197	98 651–98 657	7	1895–1897	C1′ n2t	Copy of the Bavarian D VIII
T 4^{I}	322–325	98 681–98 684	4	1908	C1′ n2t	More robust version; Replaced the T 2^{II} on the Lautertalbahn
T 4^{II}	257–259	98 401–98 403	3	1900	C1′ n2t	Nachbau der Bavarian D XI
T 5	306–309	94 001–94 004	4	1907	E n2t	for the Biebermühle–Pirmasens ramp
D VIII	326–329	98 685–98 688	4	1909–1910	C1′ n2t	Upgrade of the T 4^{I}
Pt 3/6	330–338	77 101–77 109	9	1911–1913	1′C2′ h2t	Upgrade of the P 5 with superheater
Pt 3/6	401–410	77 120–77 129	10	1923	1′C2′ h2t	Follow-on order by the Bavarian Group Administration (Gruppenverwaltung Bayern)
R 4/4	123^{(II)}…159^{(II)}	92 2001–92 2007	9	1913–1915	D n2t	

=== Narrow gauge locomotives ===
The Palatine narrow gauge locomotives procured for the following metre gauge branch lines (Lokalbahnen):

- Ludwigshafen–Dannstadt–Meckenheim
- Ludwigshafen–Frankenthal–Großkarlbach
- Speyer–Geinsheim–Neustadt (Haardt)
- Alsenz–Obermoschel

Class	Railway number(s)	DRG number(s)	Quantity	Year(s) of manufacture	Axle arrangement (UIC) Bauart	Remarks
L 1	XI–XXII, XXVIII	99 081–99 092	13	1889–1907	C n2t	Fully enclosed tramway locomotive
L 2	XXIII–XXVII	99 001–99 005	5	1903–1905	B n2t	For Alsenz–Obermoschel and Speyer–Geinsheim
Pts 2/2	XXX	99 011	1	1910	B h2t	Bought in 1916 for the Palatine network
Pts 3/3 N	XXIX	99 093	1	1911	C n2t	Copy of the L 1
Pts 3/3 H	XXXI–XXXIII	99 101–99 103	3	1923	C h2t	Ordered by the Bavarian Group Administration (Gruppenverwaltung Bayern), partly enclosed tramway locomotive

== Railbuses ==
Palatine railbuses were introduced into the wagon fleet and were given wagon numbers. In addition to the new vehicles listed in the table below, two accumulator cars left by an electric company in 1896/97 were tested. Furthermore, between 1897 and 1900 four four-wheeled passenger coaches – one with an additional centre axle - were converted provisionally to accumulator cars and placed in service. After the delivery of new wagons the passenger coaches were restored to their original state.

Class	Railway number(s)	DRG number(s)	Quantity	Year(s) of manufacture	Axle arrangement (UIC)	Remarks
None	I–II		2	1898	Bo′2′ g2t	Accumulator car for metre gauge, converted in 1903 to passenger coaches
None	III		1	1900	Bo g2t	Accumulator car for metre gauge, retired in 1910
MC	3050, 5130	bis ca. 1928: Ludwigshafen 301–302 danach: 206	2	1900	A1A g2t	Accumulator car, Ludwigshafen 301 1927 converted to passenger coach
MBCC	8856–8859	bis ca. 1928: Ludwigshafen 207–210 danach: 207–209	4	1900–1902	Bo′2′ g2t	Accumulator car
MBCL	I		1	1903	A1 n2v	Steam railbus, De Dion-Bouton type, identical design to the Bavarian MBCi

== See also ==
- History of rail transport in Germany
- Länderbahnen
- Palatinate (region)
- Palatinate Railway
- UIC classification
