= Palatine L 2 =

Palatine L 2 DRG Class 99^{00}
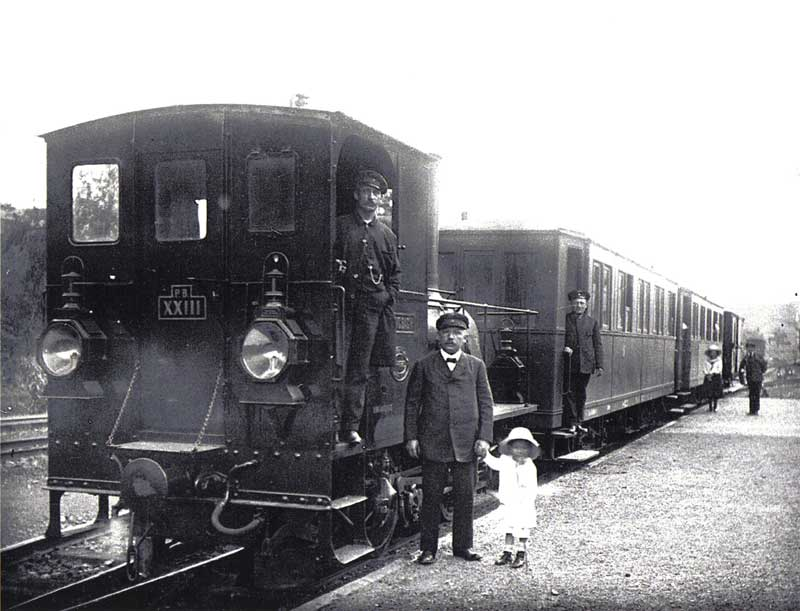
- No. XXIII KLINGBACH in 1903
Type and origin
- Power type: Steam
- Builder: Krauss
- Serial number: 4920–4921, 5198–5200
- Build date: 1903–1905
- Total produced: 5
Specifications
- Configuration
  - Whyte: 0-4-0T
  - German: K 22.8
- Gauge: 1,000 mm (3 ft 3 3/8 in)
- Driver dia.: 855 mm (2 ft 9 5/8 in)
- Wheelbase
  - Coupled: 1,800 mm (5 ft 10 3/4 in)
- Length
  - Over buffers: 6,030 mm (19 ft 9 1/2 in)
- Height: 3,600 mm (11 ft 9 3/4 in)
- Adhesive weight: 15.0 t (14.8 long tons; 16.5 short tons)
- Service weight: 15.0 t (14.8 long tons; 16.5 short tons)
- Fuel type: Coal
- Fuel capacity: 600 kg (1,300 lb)
- Water cap.: 1.4 m^{3} (310 imp gal; 370 US gal)
- Firebox
  - Grate area: 0.5 m^{2} (5.4 sq ft)
- Boiler
  - Pitch: 1,652 mm (5 ft 5 in)
  - Tube plates: 2,400 mm (7 ft 10 1/2 in)
  - Small tubes: 44 mm (1 3/4 in), 80 off
- Boiler pressure: 12 bar (12.2 kgf/cm^{2}; 174 lbf/in^{2})
- Heating surface
  - Firebox: 2.48 m^{2} (26.7 sq ft)
  - Tubes: 22.92 m^{2} (246.7 sq ft)
  - Total surface: 25.40 m^{2} (273.4 sq ft)
- Cylinders: Two, outside
- Cylinder size: 240 mm × 400 mm (9 7/16 in × 15 3/4 in)
- Valve gear: Stephenson
Performance figures
- Maximum speed: 30 km/h (19 mph)
Career
- Numbers: Pflaz: XXIII–XVII; DRG 99 001 – 99 005
- Retired: 1931–1936

The Palatine Class L 2 were a group of steam locomotives used on the Palatinate Railway in early 20th century Bavaria. They were built for the line between Speyer and Neustadt an der Weinstrasse (Neustadt-Speyer railway). Because the engines were to be used double-headed, they had doors on the front and rear of the driver's cabs and an opening in the running plate. This enabled access to the locomotive from the train whilst running.

They had the numbers XIII to XVII. After the foundation of the Reichsbahn all the engines were taken over and were given the numbers 99 001 to 99 005. The first engine was retired as early as 1931, the last one in 1936. They carried 1.4 m^{3} of water and 0.6 t of coal.

== See also ==
- Royal Bavarian State Railways
- List of Bavarian locomotives and railbuses
- List of Palatine locomotives and railbuses
