= Palatine T 4.I =

Palatine T 4^{I} and D VIII DRG Class 98^{6}
Type and origin
- Power type: Steam
- Builder: Lokomotivfabrik Krauss & Comp.
- Serial number: 3233–3236, 3670–3672, 6070–6073, 6223–6226
- Build date: 1895–1910
- Total produced: 15
Specifications
- Configuration
  - Whyte: 0-6-2T
  - UIC: C1′ n2t
  - German: T 4^{I}: L 34.12; D VIII: L 34.13
- Gauge: 1,435 mm (4 ft 8 1/2 in)
- Driver dia.: 996 mm (3 ft 3 1/4 in)
- Trailing dia.: 780 or 790 mm (2 ft 6 3/4 in or 2 ft 7 1/8 in)
- Wheelbase
  - Engine: 5,500 mm (18 ft 1/2 in)
  - Coupled: 2,800 mm (9 ft 2 1/4 in)
- Length
  - Over buffers: 9,700 or 10,090 mm (31 ft 10 in or 33 ft 1 1/4 in)
- Axle load: 12.2 or 13.6 t (12.0 or 13.4 long tons; 13.4 or 15.0 short tons)
- Adhesive weight: 36.6 or 40.2 t (36.0 or 39.6 long tons; 40.3 or 44.3 short tons)
- Service weight: 47.2 or 51.4 t (46.5 or 50.6 long tons; 52.0 or 56.7 short tons)
- Fuel type: Coal
- Fuel capacity: 2.2 or 2.7 t (2.2 or 2.7 long tons; 2.4 or 3.0 short tons)
- Water cap.: 6.5 or 8.0 m^{3} (1,400 or 1,800 imp gal; 1,700 or 2,100 US gal)
- Firebox
  - Grate area: 1.42 m^{2} (15.3 sq ft)
- Boiler
  - Pitch: 2,073 mm (6 ft 9 5/8 in)
  - Tube plates: 3,800 mm (12 ft 5 1/2 in)
  - Small tubes: 45 mm (1 3/4 in), 159 off
- Boiler pressure: 12 or 13 bar (12.2 or 13.3 kgf/cm^{2}; 174 or 189 lbf/in^{2})
- Heating surface
  - Firebox: 5.88 m^{2} (63.3 sq ft)
  - Tubes: 75.89 m^{2} (816.9 sq ft)
  - Total surface: 81.77 m^{2} (880.2 sq ft)
- Cylinders: Two, outside
- Cylinder size: 406 mm × 508 mm (16 in × 20 in)
- Loco brake: Riggenbach counter-pressure brake
Performance figures
- Maximum speed: 45 km/h (28 mph)
- Indicated power: 390 PS (287 kW; 385 hp)
Career
- Numbers: Pflaz: 194–197, 44–45, 56, 322–329; DRG 98 651 – 98 657, 98 681 – 98 688
- Retired: 1950

The locomotives of Palatine Class T 4^{I} were saturated steam tank engines operated by the Palatinate Railway. Krauss delivered four of them in 1895 and a further three in 1897. The development of these engines had been based on the second batch of Bavarian D VIII engines and they differed only in a few dimensions: for example, the diameter of the carrying and coupled wheels was smaller. In addition they had a larger coal tank.

In 1908 and 1910 Krauss supplied two batches, each of four locomotives, which were now designated the Palatine D VIII. These differed in having a larger fuel tank and a higher maximum boiler pressure: 13 as opposed to 12 bar.

In 1925 the Deutsche Reichsbahn took over all 15 locomotives and grouped them together with the Bavarian D VIII into DRG Class 98.6. The first seven machines were allocated numbers 98 651–657 and the eight newer ones numbers 98 681–688. The first group was retired by 1940, the second survived to join the Deutsche Bundesbahn fleet. Nos. 98 682 and 98 686 were the last two units to be retired, in 1950.

In 1949 the Augsburger Localbahn bought no. 98 683 and operated it as "no. 10" until 1957.

== See also ==
- Palatinate Railway
- List of Palatine locomotives and railbuses
