= Palatine T 4.II =

Class of 3 German 0-6-2T locomotives

Pfalz T 4^{II} DRG-Baureihe 98^{4}
Type and origin
- Power type: Steam
- Builder: Lokomotivfabrik Krauss & Comp.
- Serial number: 4352–4354
- Build date: 1900
- Total produced: 3
Specifications
- Configuration
  - Whyte: 0-6-2T
  - UIC: C1′ n2t
  - German: L 34.10
- Gauge: 1,435 mm (4 ft 8 1/2 in)
- Driver dia.: 996 mm (3 ft 3 1/4 in)
- Trailing dia.: 790 mm (2 ft 7 1/8 in)
- Wheelbase
  - Engine: 4,900 mm (16 ft 7/8 in)
  - Coupled: 2,800 mm (9 ft 2 1/4 in)
- Length
  - Over buffers: 9,294 mm (30 ft 6 in)
- Axle load: 10.5 tonnes (10.3 long tons; 11.6 short tons)
- Adhesive weight: 31.5 tonnes (31.0 long tons; 34.7 short tons)
- Service weight: 39.6 tonnes (39.0 long tons; 43.7 short tons)
- Fuel type: Coal
- Fuel capacity: 1.5 t (1.5 long tons; 1.7 short tons)
- Water cap.: 4.3 m^{3} (950 imp gal; 1,100 US gal)
- Firebox
  - Grate area: 1.30 m^{2} (14.0 sq ft)
- Boiler
  - Pitch: 2,028 mm (6 ft 7 13/16 in)
  - Tube plates: 3,600 mm (11 ft 9 3/4 in)
  - Small tubes: 45 mm (1 3/4 in), 138 off
- Boiler pressure: 12 bar (12.2 kgf/cm^{2}; 174 lbf/in^{2})
- Heating surface
  - Firebox: 4.95 m^{2} (53.3 sq ft)
  - Tubes: 62.40 m^{2} (671.7 sq ft)
  - Total surface: 67.35 m^{2} (724.9 sq ft)
- Cylinders: 2
- Cylinder size: 375 mm × 508 mm (14 3/4 in × 20 in)
- Loco brake: Schleifer brake
Performance figures
- Maximum speed: 45 km/h (28 mph)
- Indicated power: 235 kW (320 PS; 315 hp)
Career
- Numbers: Pfalz: 257–259; DRG 98 401 – 98 403
- Retired: 1934

The Palatine T 4^{II} was a class of saturated steam, tank locomotives operated by the Palatinate Railway.

They were to a large extent identical to the Class D XI from Bavaria, but the grate area and diameters of the carrying and coupled wheels were smaller. The rear coupled axle was housed in a Krauss-Helmholtz bogie, and the coal tanks were behind the driver's cab. It achieved its top speed on the level with a 400 tonne train.

The three examples that were built were given railway numbers 257 to 259 and the names Ulmet, Eschenau and Erdesbach. In 1925 the Deutsche Reichsbahn took all three machines over as DRG Class 98.4 with locomotive numbers 98 401 to 98 403. Until their retirement in 1933/34 the engines were stabled at Landau locomotive shed.

== See also ==
- Royal Bavarian State Railways
- Palatinate Railway
- List of Bavarian locomotives and railbuses
- List of Palatine locomotives and railbuses
