= Palatine T 5 =

Palatine T 5 DRG Class 94.0
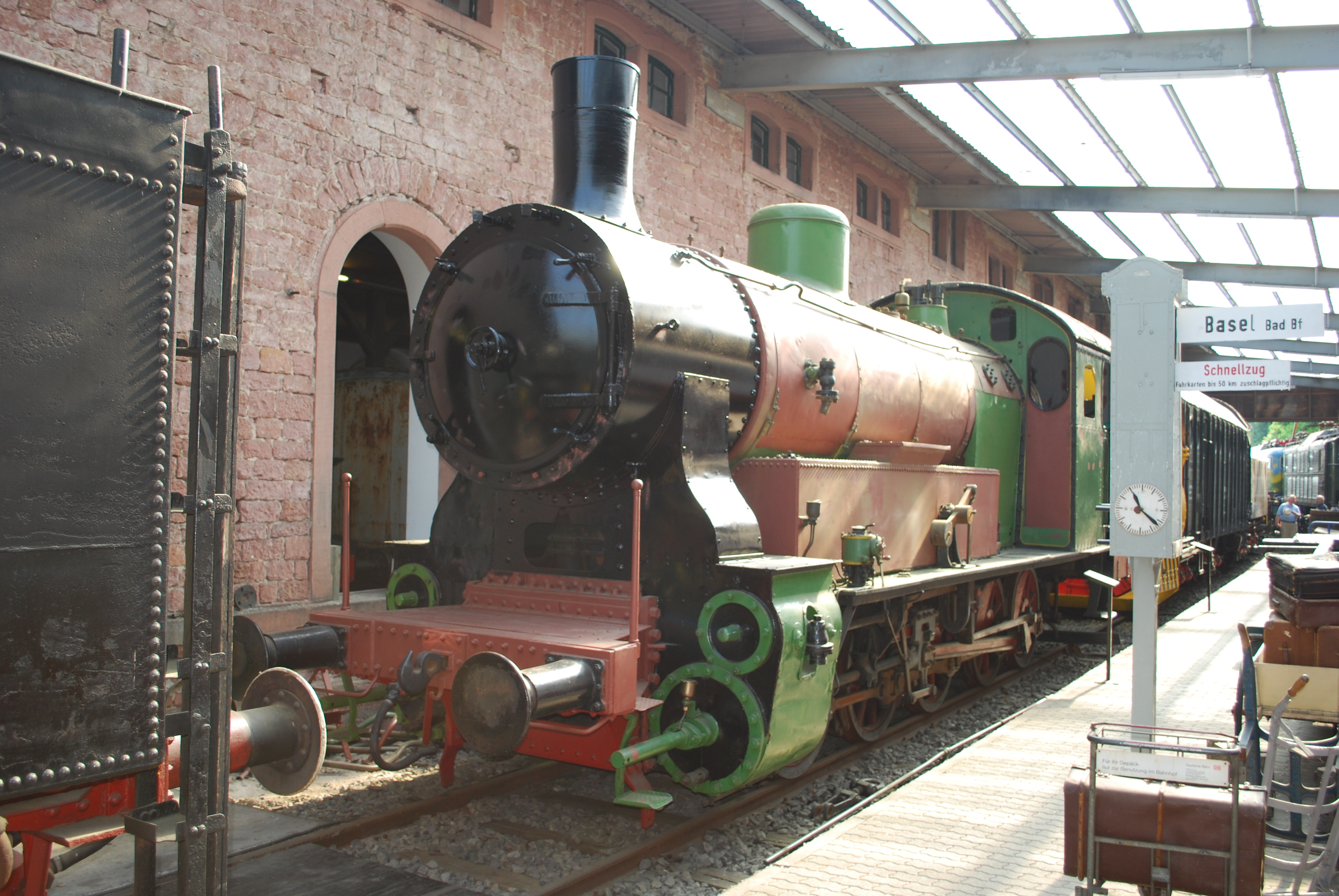
- Pfalzbahn 307, later DRG 94 002 at the Neustadt/Weinstrasse Railway Museum, June 2011
Type and origin
- Power type: Steam
- Builder: Krauss
- Serial number: 5778–5781
- Model: 1907
- Total produced: 4
Specifications
- Configuration
  - Whyte: 0-10-0T
  - UIC: E n2t
  - German: Gt 55.14
- Gauge: 1,435 mm (4 ft 8 1/2 in)
- Driver dia.: 1,180 mm (3 ft 10 1/2 in)
- Wheelbase
  - Axle spacing (Asymmetrical): 1,340 mm (4 ft 4 3/4 in) +; 1,340 mm (4 ft 4 3/4 in) +; 1,580 mm (5 ft 2 1/4 in) +; 1,340 mm (4 ft 4 3/4 in)
  - Engine: 5,600 mm (18 ft 4 1/2 in)
- Length
  - Over buffers: 12,020 mm (39 ft 5 1/4 in)
- Axle load: 14.4 t (14.2 long tons; 15.9 short tons)
- Adhesive weight: 72.0 t (70.9 long tons; 79.4 short tons)
- Empty weight: 56.8 t (55.9 long tons; 62.6 short tons)
- Service weight: 72.0 t (70.9 long tons; 79.4 short tons)
- Fuel type: Coal
- Fuel capacity: 2.5 t (2.5 long tons; 2.8 short tons)
- Water cap.: 6.0 m^{3} (1,300 imp gal; 1,600 US gal)
- Firebox
  - Grate area: 2.73 m^{2} (29.4 sq ft)
- Boiler
  - Pitch: 2,710 mm (8 ft 10 3/4 in)
  - Tube plates: 4,350 mm (14 ft 3 1/4 in)
  - Small tubes: 50 mm (1 15/16 in), 253 off
- Boiler pressure: 13 bar (13.3 kgf/cm^{2}; 189 lbf/in^{2})
- Heating surface
  - Firebox: 11.5 m^{2} (124 sq ft)
  - Tubes: 157.5 m^{2} (1,695 sq ft)
  - Total surface: 169.0 m^{2} (1,819 sq ft)
- Cylinders: Two, outside
- Cylinder size: 560 mm × 560 mm (22 1/16 in × 22 1/16 in)
- Loco brake: Schleicher compressed-air brake, 2nd and 3rd coupled axle braked both sides
Performance figures
- Maximum speed: 40 km/h (25 mph)
Career
- Numbers: Pfalz: 306–309; DRG 94 001 – 94 004
- Retired: September 1926

Class T 5 of the Palatinate Railway was a German, goods train, tank locomotive class with five coupled axles and no carrying axles.

In 1925 they were absorbed by the Deutsche Reichsbahn as DRG Class 94.0 into their renumbering plan.

These engines were bought specifically for the inclines between Pirmasens and Biebermühle. They could reach a speed of 40 km/h on the level with a 1,510 tonne train load, and 30 km/h on an incline of 2%. Overall, however, they were unable to match the power of locomotives from Prussia or Saxony and were retired by 1926.

The locomotive which was formerly no. 307 in the Palatinate Railway (DRG No. 94 002) was disposed of to the Eschweiler Mining Union and employed at the Baesweiler coal mine, where it was given the name of Carl Alexander and the number 3; it remained in service there until 1974. Today it is displayed at the Neustadt/Weinstrasse Railway Museum in Neustadt an der Weinstrasse, Rhineland-Palatinate, Germany.

== See also ==
- Royal Bavarian State Railways
- Palatinate Railway
- List of Bavarian locomotives and railbuses
- List of Palatine locomotives and railbuses
