= Class 77 =

Class 77 may refer to:

- British Rail Class 77
- Class 77, a designation for EMD Class 66 operated by Euro Cargo Rail in France
- DRG Class 77, a German tank locomotive class with wheel arrangements 2-6-4T or 4-6-2T operated by the Deutsche Reichsbahn and comprising:
  - Class 77.0: Palatine P 5
  - Class 77.1: Palatine Pt 3/6 and Bavarian Pt 3/6
  - Class 77.2: BBÖ 629, PKP Class Okm11
  - Class 77.3: ČSD Class 354.1
- Belgian Railways Class 77, a Belgian diesel locomotive used both for shunting and for mainline cargo service
- Class of 1977 (China), the first university entrance examination after the Cultural revolution in China.
