= Palatine Pts 2/2 =

Palatine Pts 2/2 DRG Class 99.01
Type and origin
- Power type: Steam
- Builder: Maffei
- Serial number: 3637
- Build date: 1916
- Total produced: 1
Specifications
- Configuration
  - Whyte: 0-4-0T
  - UIC: B h2t
  - German: K 22.7
- Gauge: 1,000 mm (3 ft 3 3/8 in)
- Driver dia.: 800 mm (2 ft 7 1/2 in)
- Wheelbase
  - Engine: 1,600 mm (5 ft 3 in)
- Length
  - Over buffers: 6,003 mm (19 ft 8 1/4 in)
- Axle load: 7.9 t (7.8 long tons; 8.7 short tons)
- Adhesive weight: 15.8 t (15.6 long tons; 17.4 short tons)
- Service weight: 15.8 t (15.6 long tons; 17.4 short tons)
- Fuel type: Coal
- Fuel capacity: 600 kg (1,300 lb)
- Water cap.: 1.7 m^{3} (370 imp gal; 450 US gal)
- Firebox
  - Grate area: 0.53 m^{2} (5.7 sq ft)
- Boiler
  - Pitch: 1,710 mm (5 ft 7 3/8 in)
  - Tube plates: 2,200 mm (7 ft 2 7/12 in)
  - Small tubes: 45 mm (1 3/4 in), 45 off
  - Large tubes: 89 mm (3 1/2 in), 12 off
- Boiler pressure: 12 bar (12.2 kg/cm^{2}; 174 lbf/in^{2})
- Heating surface
  - Firebox: 2.69 m^{2} (29.0 sq ft)
  - Tubes and flues: 19.86 m^{2} (213.8 sq ft)
  - Total surface: 22.55 m^{2} (242.7 sq ft)
- Superheater
  - Heating area: 6.00 m^{2} (64.6 sq ft)
- Cylinders: 2
- Cylinder size: 290 mm × 400 mm (11 7/16 in × 15 3/4 in)
- Valve gear: Walschaerts (Heusinger)
Performance figures
- Maximum speed: 30 km/h (19 mph)
Career
- Numbers: Pfalz: XXX DRG: 99 011
- Retired: 1931

The German steam locomotive of Palatine Class Pts 2/2 of the Palatinate Railway was a one-off and was built by the firm of Maffei in Munich. Notable features were the high boiler and the locomotive frame used as a water tank. Coal was carried in two bunkers on the left and right of the driver's cab.

After the formation of the Deutsche Reichsbahn the engine was taken over and given the number '99 011'. It was retired by 1931.

== See also ==
- Royal Bavarian State Railways
- Palatinate Railway
- List of Bavarian locomotives and railbuses
- List of Palatine locomotives and railbuses
