= Tramways of the Salinas Chicas =

Narrow-gauge railways in Argentina

Coordinates: 38.7706°S 62.9363°W

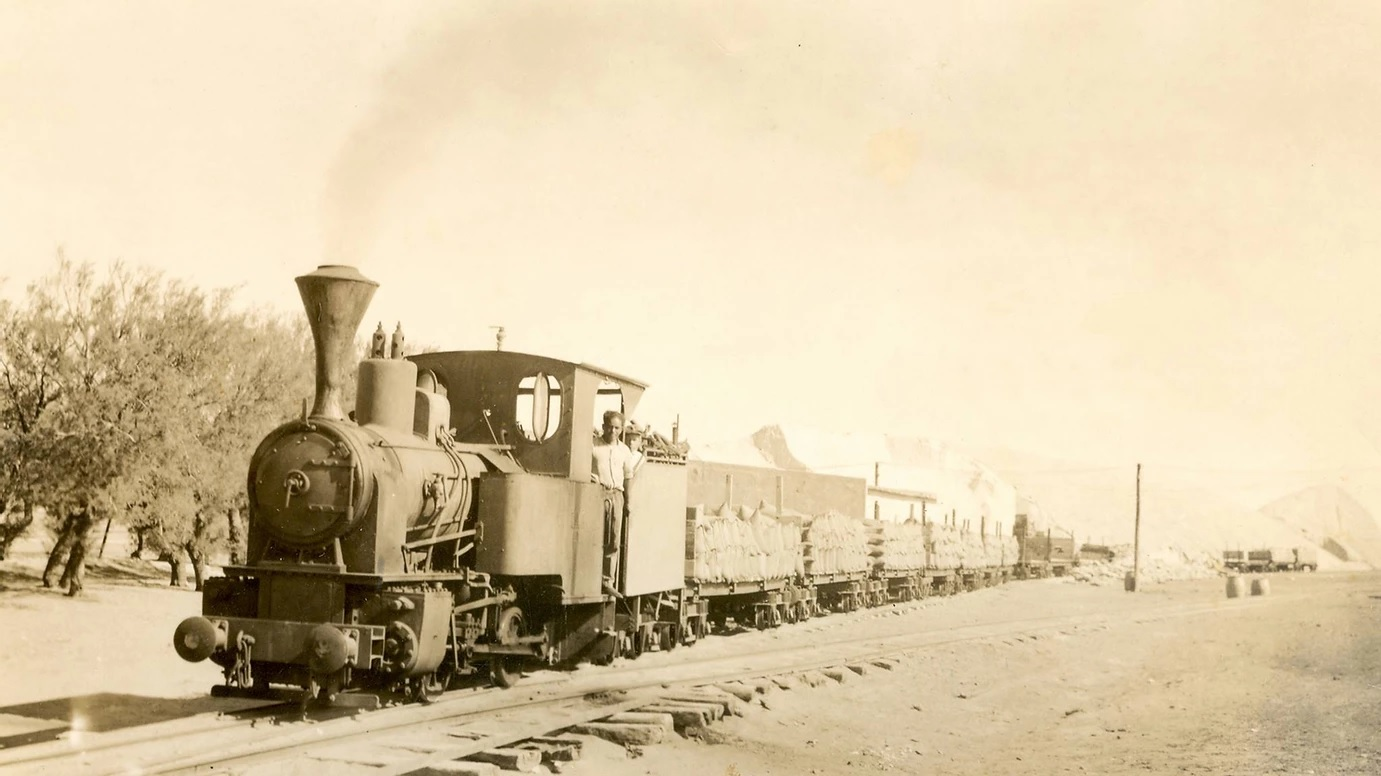
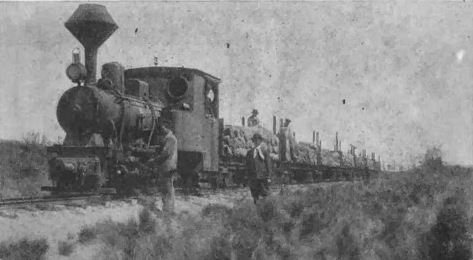
- Salt transport with an O&K steam locomotive Salt transport with a Krauss steam locomotive

Technical
- Line length: 22 km (14 mi)
- Track gauge: 750 mm (2 ft 5 1/2 in)
Route map
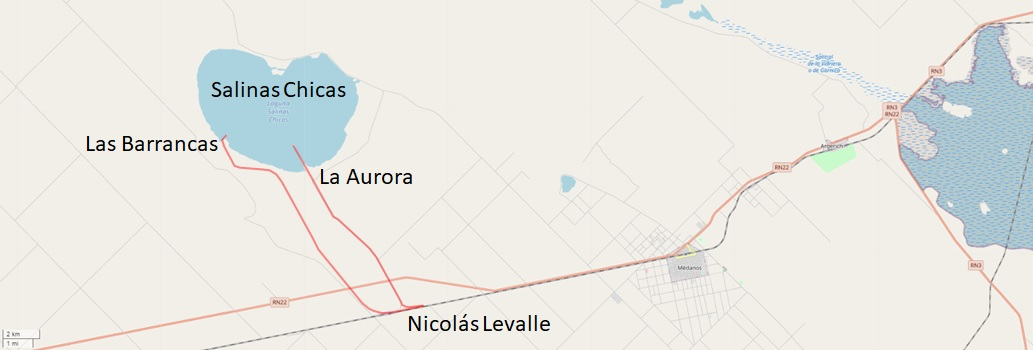
Route of the track superimposed onto a modern map

The Tramways of the Salinas Chicas were two 750 mm (2 ft 5 1/2 in) gauge railways with a total length of 22 km (14 mi). They ran from the Nicolás Levalle railway station^{(es)} to the Salinas Chicas in the La Pampa Province between Neuquén und Bahía Blanca in Argentina.

== History ==
The salt flats were exploited by the company Salinas Chicas in La Aurora, founded in 1903 by Bernardo Garciarena, to mine a 1–3 centimetres (0.39–1.18 in) thick layer of salt, which was formed by the evaporation of seawater in a lagoon, which is now 42 metres (138 ft) below sea level. The salt was initially pushed together with graders pulled by mules and transported to the railway station in tippers.

In the beginning, animals were used to mine about 500 to 1000 tons of salt per year, and from 1910 steam locomotives manufactured by Orenstein & Koppel and Krauss (N° 5998/1908) were also used, with wagons made in Germany. At this time, another company was founded nearby under the name of Salina Las Barrancas. From the 1950s, tractors were used to mine 50,000 to 200,000 tonnes of salt per year.

The operation of the tramway ceased in 1990. Today, La Aurora SAIC y G. extracts about 1000 tons of salt per day on an industrial scale, washes it, packages it mainly in 50 kg bags and sells it.

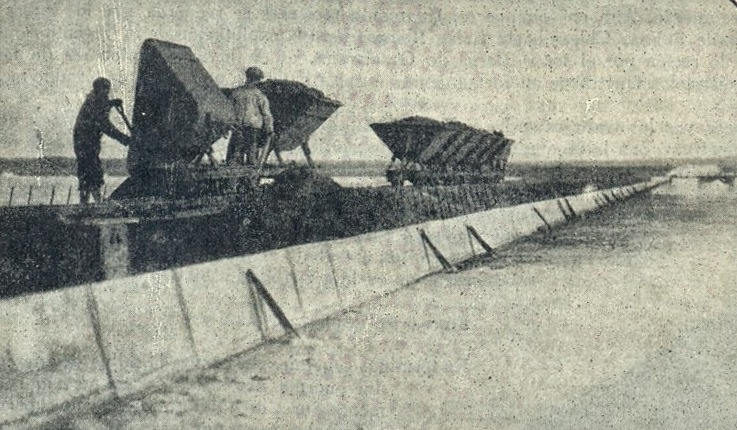
Building a 1 km (0.6 mi) long dam into the lagoon

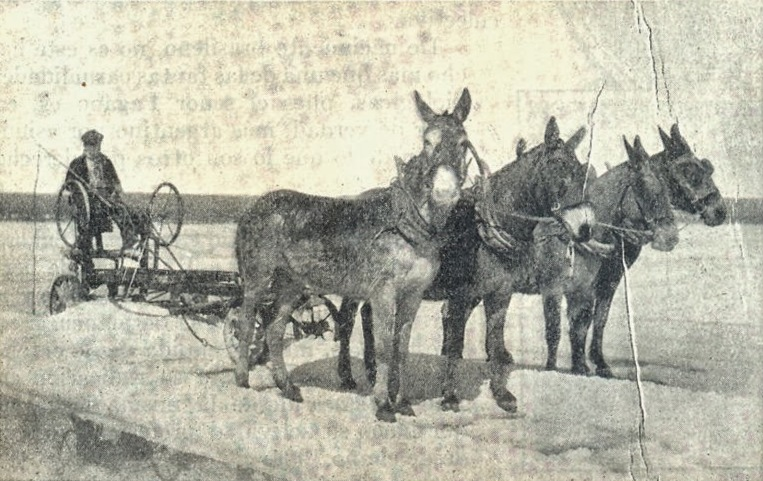
Scraping the salt with a grader

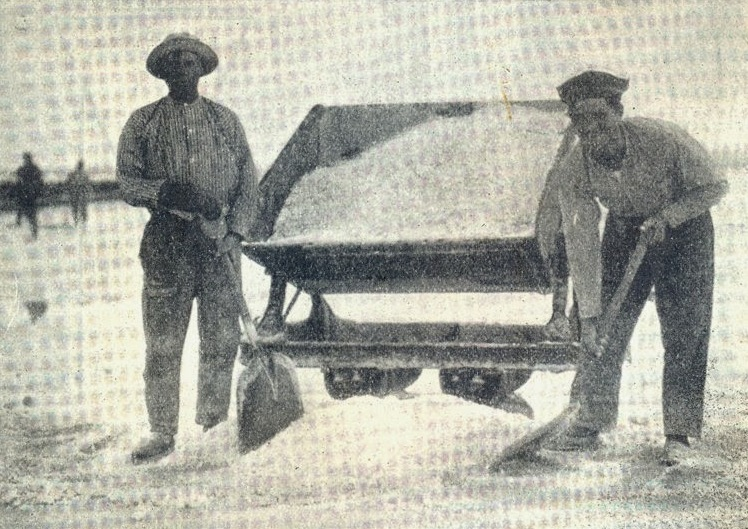
Loading a V skip waggon

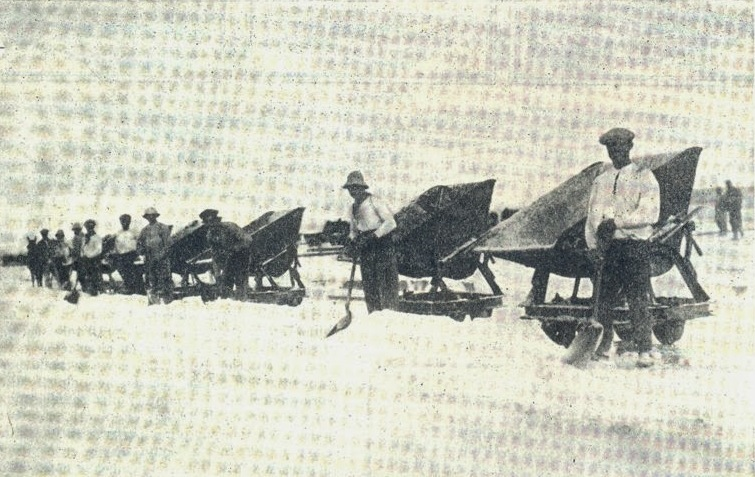
Loading V skip waggons

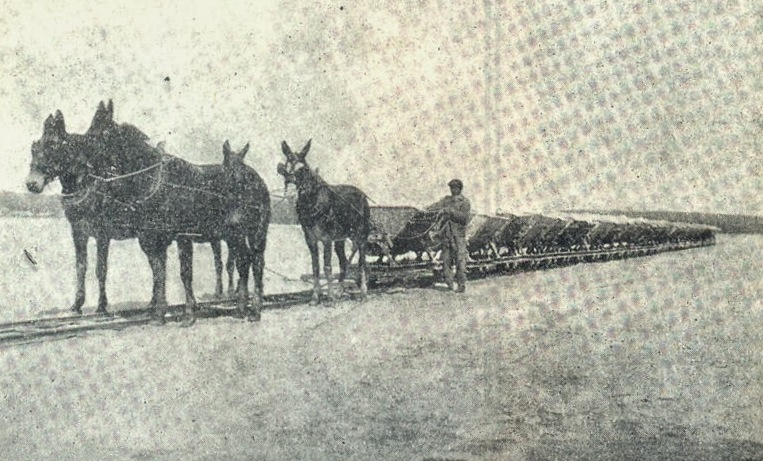
Hauling a train by mules
