= Palatine P 5 =

Palatine P 5 Palatine Pt 3/6 Bavarian Pt 3/6
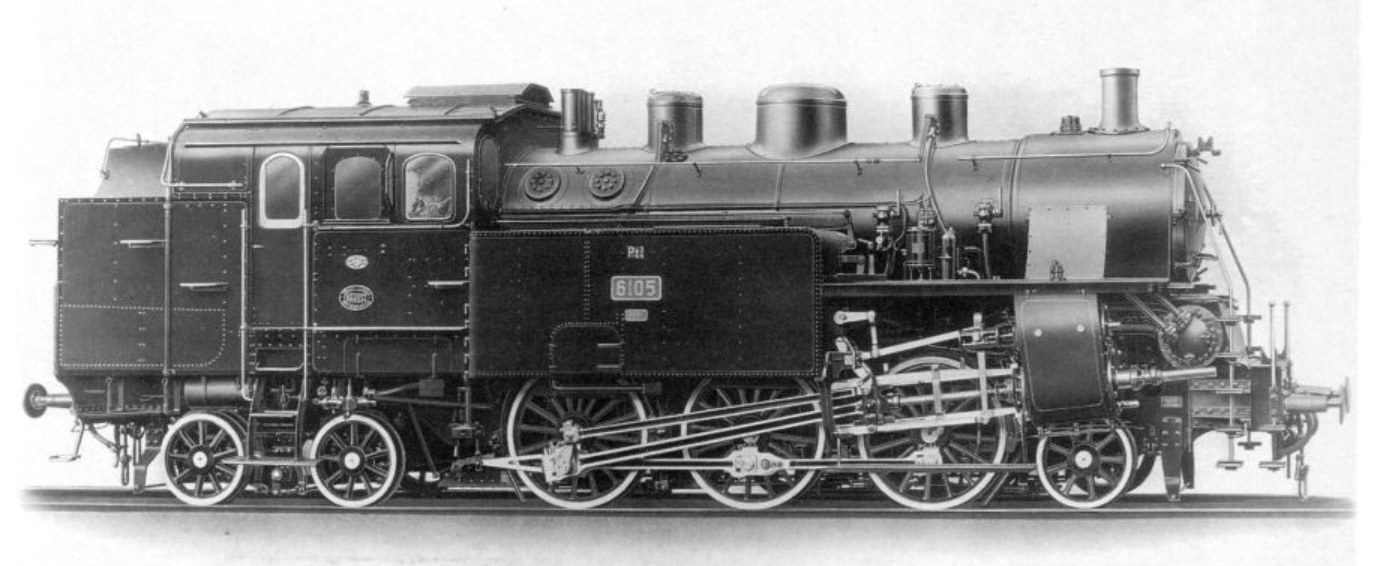
- Bavarian Pt 3/6 No. 6105
Type and origin
- Power type: Steam
- Builder: Lokomotivfabrik Krauss & Comp.
- Build date: P 5: 1908; Pt 3/6: 1911–1923
- Total produced: P 5: 12; Pt 3/6: 29
Specifications
- Configuration
  - Whyte: 2-6-4T
  - UIC: P 5: 1′C2′ n2t later 1′C2′ h2t; Pt 3/6: 1′C2′ h2t
  - German: Pt 36.16
- Gauge: 1,435 mm (4 ft 8 1/2 in)
- Leading dia.: 960 mm (3 ft 1 3/4 in)
- Driver dia.: 1,500 mm (4 ft 11 in)
- Trailing dia.: 960 mm (3 ft 1 3/4 in)
- Length
  - Over buffers: P 5:13,140 mm (43 ft 1 1/4 in); Pt 3/6: 13,460 mm (44 ft 2 in)
- Axle load: P 5: 16.7 t (16.4 long tons; 18.4 short tons); Pt 3/6: 16.1–16.3 t (15.8–16.0 long tons; 17.7–18.0 short tons)
- Adhesive weight: P 5: 50.0 t (49.2 long tons; 55.1 short tons); Pt 3/6: 48.3–48.8 t (47.5–48.0 long tons; 53.2–53.8 short tons)
- Service weight: P 5: 92.9 t (91.4 long tons; 102.4 short tons); Pt 3/6: 91.1–94.8 t (89.7–93.3 long tons; 100.4–104.5 short tons)
- Fuel type: Coal
- Fuel capacity: 4.0 t (3.9 long tons; 4.4 short tons)
- Water cap.: 15.3 m^{3} (3,400 imp gal; 4,000 US gal)
- Firebox
  - Grate area: 2.34 m^{2} (25.2 sq ft)
- Boiler
  - Tube plates: 4,000 mm (157 1/2 in)
  - Small tubes: P 5: 45 mm (1 3/4 in), 256 off; Pt 3/6; 45 mm (1 3/4 in), 133 or 135 off
  - Large tubes: Pt 3/5: 133 mm (5 1/4 in), 21 off
- Boiler pressure: 13 bar (13.3 kg/cm^{2}; 189 lbf/in^{2})
- Heating surface
  - Firebox: 10.32 m^{2} (111.1 sq ft)
  - Tubes: P 5: 66.92 m^{2} (720.3 sq ft); Pt 3/6: 67.94 m^{2} (731.3 sq ft)
  - Flues: Pt 3/5: 32.70 m^{2} (352.0 sq ft)
  - Total surface: P 5: 139.5 m^{2} (1,502 sq ft); Pt 3/6: 110.94 m^{2} (1,194.1 sq ft)
- Superheater
  - Heating area: 35.00 m^{2} (376.7 sq ft)
- Cylinders: Two, outside
- Cylinder size: 530 mm × 560 mm (20 7/8 in × 22 1/16 in)
Performance figures
- Maximum speed: 90 km/h (56 mph)
- Indicated power: 633 kW (861 PS; 849 hp)
Career
- Numbers: P 5: Palatinate: 310–321; DRG 77 001 – 77 012; Pt 3/6: Palatinate: 330–338, 401–410; Bavaria: 6101–6110; DRG 77 101 – 77 129
- Retired: P 5: 1951; Pt 3/6: 1956

The six-coupled P 5 of the Palatinate Railway (Pfalzbahn) was to replace the four-coupled locomotives in the Palatinate. They were given a leading Krauss-Helmholtz bogie and a trailing bogie in order to achieve satisfactory weight distribution.

The firm of Krauss delivered twelve examples in 1908. One notable feature was the particularly large coal and water tanks requested by the Railway. The Deutsche Reichsbahn took all the vehicles over and converted them to superheated engines. After the end of the Second World War nine were left. Most of them were sold to private railways. The last one owned by the Deutsche Bundesbahn was retired in 1951.

After the Palatine P 5 had proved successful, the Royal Bavarian State Railways (Königlich Bayerische Staatsbahn) decided to procure more of this class in a more powerful version. As a result, the Palatine Pt 3/6 was built from 1911. A total of 19 engines were procured. In 1923 a further 10 of these two-cylinder superheated steam engines were ordered for Bavaria as the Bavarian Pt 3/6. They were deployed on the express train routes between Garmisch-Partenkirchen and Munich. All the engines were taken over by the Reichsbahn, the Bavarian versions being given the operating numbers 77 110–119. One machine was lost during the Second World War. The Deutsche Bundesbahn took over 27 engines and retired them by 1954. One locomotive remained with the East German DR and was retired in 1956.

== See also ==
- List of Bavarian locomotives and railbuses
- List of Palatine locomotives and railbuses

== Literature ==
- Emich/Becker (1996), Die Eisenbahnen an Glan und Lauter (in German), Waldmohr: Selbstverlag, ISBN 3-9804919-0-0
- Lothar Spielhoff (2011), Lokomotiven der Pfälzischen Eisenbahn (in German), Germering: Jürgen Pepke, ISBN 978-3-940798-15-2
- Manfred Weisbrod, Hans Müller, Wolfgang Petznick: Dampflokomotiven 3. Baureihen 61 bis 98. 4. Auflage, transpress Verlagsgesellschaft, Berlin 1994, ISBN 3-344-70841-4, S. 85 ff.
- Ludwig v. Welser, Helge Hufschläger (1999), Bayern-Report Heft 8 (in German), Fürstenfeldbruck: Hermann Merker Verlag, ISBN 3-89610-049-1
- Karl Ernst Maedel, Alfred B. Gottwald: Deutsche Dampflokomotiven. Die Entwicklungsgeschichte. Transpress Verlag, Stuttgart 1994/1999, ISBN 3-344-70912-7, S. 211
