= Bavarian D VIII =

German steam locomotive

Bavarian D VIII, AL Nr. 1–3, 5 DRG Class 98.6 ÖBB 891
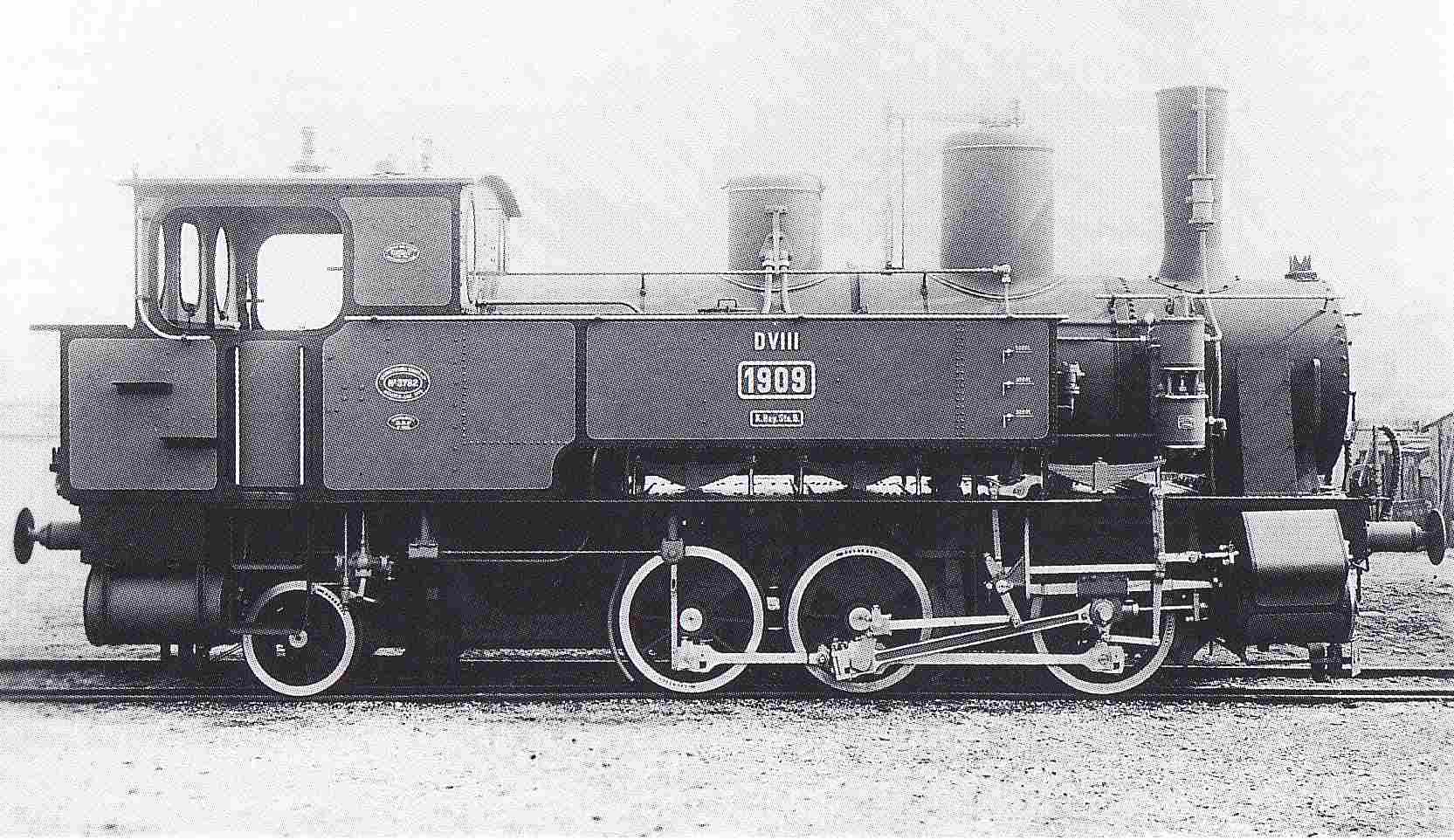
- D VIII ( No. 1909) of the Ammersee Railway in 1898
Type and origin
- Builder: Krauss
- Build date: 1888–1937
- Total produced: K.Bay.Sts.E: 18; AL: 4
Specifications
- Configuration
  - Whyte: 0-6-2T
- Gauge: 1,435 mm (4 ft 8 1/2 in)
- Driver dia.: 1,006 mm (3 ft 3 5/8 in)
- Trailing dia.: 800 mm (2 ft 7 1/2 in)
- Length
  - Over beams: 9,170 or 9,670 mm (30 ft 1 in or 31 ft 8 3/4 in)
- Axle load: 12.1 or 12.5 t (11.9 or 12.3 long tons; 13.3 or 13.8 short tons)
- Adhesive weight: 36.3 or 36.7 t (35.7 or 36.1 long tons; 40.0 or 40.5 short tons)
- Service weight: 43.3 or 47.5 t (42.6 or 46.7 long tons; 47.7 or 52.4 short tons)
- Boiler pressure: 12 kgf/cm^{2} (1,180 kPa; 171 lbf/in^{2})
- Heating surface
  - Firebox: 1.60 m^{2} (17.2 sq ft)
  - Evaporative: 89.60 or 90.40 m^{2} (964.4 or 973.1 sq ft)
- Cylinders: 2
- Cylinder size: 390 or 406 mm (15 3/8 or 16 in)
- Piston stroke: 508 mm (20 in)
Performance figures
- Maximum speed: 45 km/h (28 mph)
- Indicated power: 430 PS (316 kW; 424 hp)
Career
- Numbers: K.Bay.Sts.E: 904–906, 946–947, 1901–1914; AL: 1–3, 5; DRG 98 661 … 98 679
- Retired: 1959

The Bavarian Class D VIII (bayerische D VIII) were saturated steam locomotives with the Royal Bavarian State Railways (Königlich Bayerische Staatsbahn).

== History ==
In 1888, new locomotives were needed for the Freilassing–Berchtesgaden railway, which has inclines of up to 40 per mille (4%). Krauss initially delivered three machines, that were given the railway numbers 904, 905 and 906. The powerful boiler required a carrying axle that, based on a suggestion by Richard von Helmholtz, was designed as a trailing axle in the form of a Krauss-Helmholtz bogie. Thus equipped the locomotives had good riding qualities on the faster downhill run that was carried out backwards, while, for the slower uphill journey, it was sufficient to have the front coupled axle in the lead.

=== Additional machines ===
In 1890 a further two locomotives were procured, followed by five more in 1893 (railway numbers 946, 947 and 1901–1905).

In 1898 four more machines were acquired (Nos. 1906–1909), for the Ammersee Railway and in 1903 another five for the Munich–Herrsching railway. On these new engines the coal bunker lay behind the driver's cab, so that the distance between the third coupled axle and the trailing axle was increased by 200 mm and the total length of the locomotives by 500 mm. In addition, the Riggenbach counter-pressure brake from the first series was omitted. The boiler (apart from the location of the steam dome) and the running gear, and hence also the performance, remained unchanged.

The Palatinate Railway (Pfalzbahn) had received similar locomotives, the Class T 4.I, that however were somewhat smaller and had smaller driving and carrying wheels.

=== DRG Class ===
In 1925 the Deutsche Reichsbahn-Gesellschaft took over nine of the ten locomotives of the first series and all nine of the second redesignating them as the DRG Class 98.6 with nos. 98 661–669 and 98 671 and 98 679. The first series was retired by 1933, the second by about 1937.

After the Second World War one vehicle went to the Austrian Federal Railways (Österreichische Bundesbahnen or ÖBB) and was in service there until 1958 as ÖBB 891.01.

== Augsburg Branch Line ==
The Augsburg branch line (Augsburger Localbahn or AL) bought three locomotives in 1913 from Krauss, that were the same as the D VIII's of the second series. The locomotives, numbered 1–3, performed very well on the, in places, very tight curves of the branch line, so that even in 1937 – based on drawings almost 40 years old – a fourth locomotive of this type was procured, this time from Krauss-Maffei. It was given the railway number 5.

Locomotive Nos. 1 and 3 were scrapped in 1957, nos. 2 and 5 were sold in 1956 to the Southern Chemical Factory (Südchemie-Werk) in Kelheim.

== See also ==
- Royal Bavarian State Railways
- List of Bavarian locomotives and railbuses
