= Palatine P 4 =

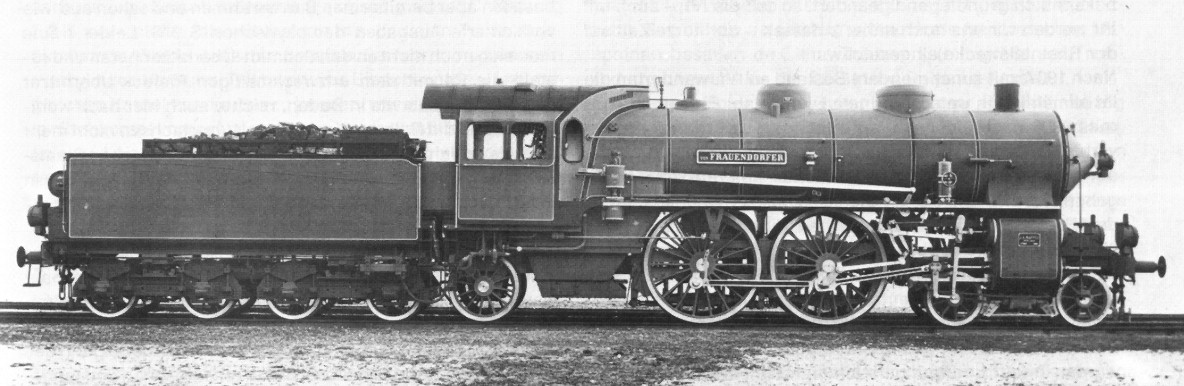
- P 4 No. 290 von Frauendorfer
Type and origin
- Power type: Steam
- Builder: Maffei
- Serial number: 2462–2467, 2515–2518, 2532
- Build date: 1905–1906
- Total produced: 11
Specifications
- Configuration
  - Whyte: 4-4-2
  - UIC: 2′B1′ n4v
- Driver: 1st coupled axle
- Gauge: 1,435 mm (4 ft 8 1/2 in)
- Leading dia.: 960 mm (3 ft 1 3/4 in)
- Driver dia.: 2,010 mm (6 ft 7 1/8 in)
- Trailing dia.: 1,216 mm (3 ft 11 7/8 in)
- Wheelbase
  - Engine: 10,240 mm (33 ft 7 1/4 in)
  - Leading: 2,200 mm (7 ft 2 1/2 in)
  - Drivers: 2,150 mm (7 ft 3/4 in)
  - Tender: 5,000 mm (16 ft 4 3/4 in)
  - Tender bogie: 1,750 mm (5 ft 9 in)
  - incl. tender: 16,800 mm (55 ft 1 1/2 in)
- Length
  - Over buffers: 18,712 mm (61 ft 4 3/4 in)
- Axle load: 16.5 tonnes (16.2 long tons; 18.2 short tons)
- Adhesive weight: 33.0 tonnes (32.5 long tons; 36.4 short tons)
- Service weight: 75.5 tonnes (74.3 long tons; 83.2 short tons) (loco only)
- Tender type: 2′2′ T 20
- Fuel type: Coal
- Fuel capacity: 6.5 tonnes (6.4 long tons; 7.2 short tons)
- Water cap.: 20 m^{3} (4,400 imp gal; 5,300 US gal)
- Firebox
  - Grate area: 3.8 m^{2} (41 sq ft)
- Boiler
  - Pitch: 2,850 mm (9 ft 4 1/4 in)
  - Tube plates: 4,700 mm (15 ft 5 in)
  - Small tubes: 49 mm (1 15/16 in) diameter, 280 off
- Boiler pressure: 15 bar (15.3 kgf/cm^{2}; 218 psi)
- Heating surface
  - Firebox: 13.8 m^{2} (149 sq ft)
  - Tubes: 167.5 m^{2} (1,803 sq ft)
  - Evaporative: 181.3 m^{2} (1,951 sq ft)
- Superheater
  - Heating area: 41.7 m^{2} (449 sq ft)
- Cylinders: Four, compound
- High-pressure cylinder: 360 mm × 640 mm (14 3/16 in × 25 3/16 in)
- Low-pressure cylinder: 590 mm × 640 mm (23 1/4 in × 25 3/16 in)
Performance figures
- Maximum speed: 120 km/h (75 mph)
Career
- Operators: Palatinate Railway
- Numbers: 286–291, 302–305, 133
- Retired: 1925

The Class P 4 steam locomotives of the Palatine Railways were express train locomotives with a 2′B1′ (Atlantic) axle arrangement and a four-cylinder compound engine. A total of eleven locomotives were built by Maffei, numbers 286–291 in 1905 and 302–305 and 133 in 1906. They replaced the P 3.1 in express train service.

The locomotives were initially fitted with Pielock superheaters, but after a few years they had to be removed again due to corrosion damage. From then on the locomotives operated as wet steam engines.

The P 4 was one of the first locomotives in Germany with bar frames. It was based on the Bavarian class built in 1903, the S 2/5; up to the second coupling axle, both types were almost the same apart from details and minor dimensional deviations. However, the P 4 had, unlike the S 2/5, a wide firebox which was arranged completely behind the coupling wheels. For this reason, the distance between the coupling axle and the rear carrying axle had to be increased significantly and the carrying axle had to be designed to be radially adjustable. This and also the streamlined cab of the P 4 gave the locomotives a distinct appearance at the rear.

The P 4 was also closely related to other Bavarian locomotive types from Maffei: the engine was adopted almost unchanged for the high-speed locomotive of the S 2/6 built in 1906 - only the cylinder diameters were slightly enlarged - otherwise both locomotives had a lot in common. The family resemblance to the Class S 3/6 built from 1908 onwards is also unmistakable; the latter looks like an enlarged P 4 with a coupling axle added.

In the provisional reclassification plan by the Deutsche Reichsbahn all eleven locomotives were due to be reassigned numbers 14 151 to 14 161, but they were decommissioned before the redesignation.

== Literature ==
- Hütter, Ingo (2009). Die Dampflokomotiven der Baureihen 01 bis 45 der DRG, DRB, DB, und DR (in German). Werl: DGEG Medien. p. 143. ISBN 978-3-937189-45-1.
- Schnabel, Heinz (1987). Eisenbahn-Fahrzeug-Archiv Band 2.5: Lokomotiven bayerischer Eisenbahnen (in German). Düsseldorf: Alba Publikation Alf Teloeken GmbH + Co KG. pp. 263–265, 385. ISBN 3-87094-105-7.
- Wilhelm Reuter: Die Schönsten der Schiene – Die Geschichte der Atlantic. Transpress, Berlin 1993, ISBN 3-613-01512-9
