= Palatine Nos. 9–20 =

Nos. 9–20 (Pfalz)
Type and origin
- Power type: Steam
- Builder: Emil Keßler (4); Maffei (4); Saint-Léonard (4)
- Build date: 1846–1847
- Total produced: 12
Specifications
- Configuration
  - Whyte: 2-4-0
  - UIC: 1B n2
- Gauge: 1,435 mm (4 ft 8 1/2 in)
- Leading dia.: 942 mm (3 ft 1 1/8 in)
- Driver dia.: 1,215 mm (3 ft 11 7/8 in)
- Wheelbase
  - Engine: 3,030 mm (9 ft 11 1/4 in)
  - Tender: 2,700 mm (8 ft 10 1/4 in) equally divided
- Axle load: 7.75 tonnes (7.63 long tons; 8.54 short tons)
- Adhesive weight: 15.5 tonnes (15.3 long tons; 17.1 short tons)
- Service weight: 22.8 tonnes (22.4 long tons; 25.1 short tons)
- Tender type: 3 T 5
- Fuel capacity: 3 tonnes (3.0 long tons; 3.3 short tons)
- Water cap.: 5.0 m^{3} (1,100 imp gal; 1,300 US gal)
- Firebox
  - Grate area: 0.81 m^{2} (8.7 sq ft)
- Boiler
  - Tube plates: 3,770 mm (12 ft 4 1/2 in)
- Boiler pressure: 6.2 bar (6.3 kgf/cm^{2}; 90 psi)
- Heating surface
  - Firebox: 4.8 m^{2} (52 sq ft)
  - Tubes: 70.0 m^{2} (753 sq ft)
  - Total surface: 74.8 m^{2} (805 sq ft)
- Cylinders: Two, outside
- Cylinder size: 356 mm × 559 mm (14 in × 22 in)
Performance figures
- Maximum speed: 45 km/h (28 mph)
Career
- Numbers: 9 to 20
- Retired: End of the 1880s

The Palatinate Railway locomotives with operating Nos. 9 to 20 were 2-4-0 locomotives acquired for mixed traffic service.

Four locomotives each were manufactured by the companies Keßler of Karlsruhe, Maffei of Munich and J.-H. Regnier-Poncelet of Saint-Léonard in Liège. Initially, the engines were equipped with a four-sided steam dome, which was omitted after the boiler was replaced. Retirement began in the 1870s and was completed in the mid-1880s.

They were equipped with Type 3 T 5 tenders.
