= Bavarian D XI =

Class of 147 German 0-6-2T locomotives

Bavarian D XI, PtL 3/4 DRG Class 98.4–5 ÖBB 791
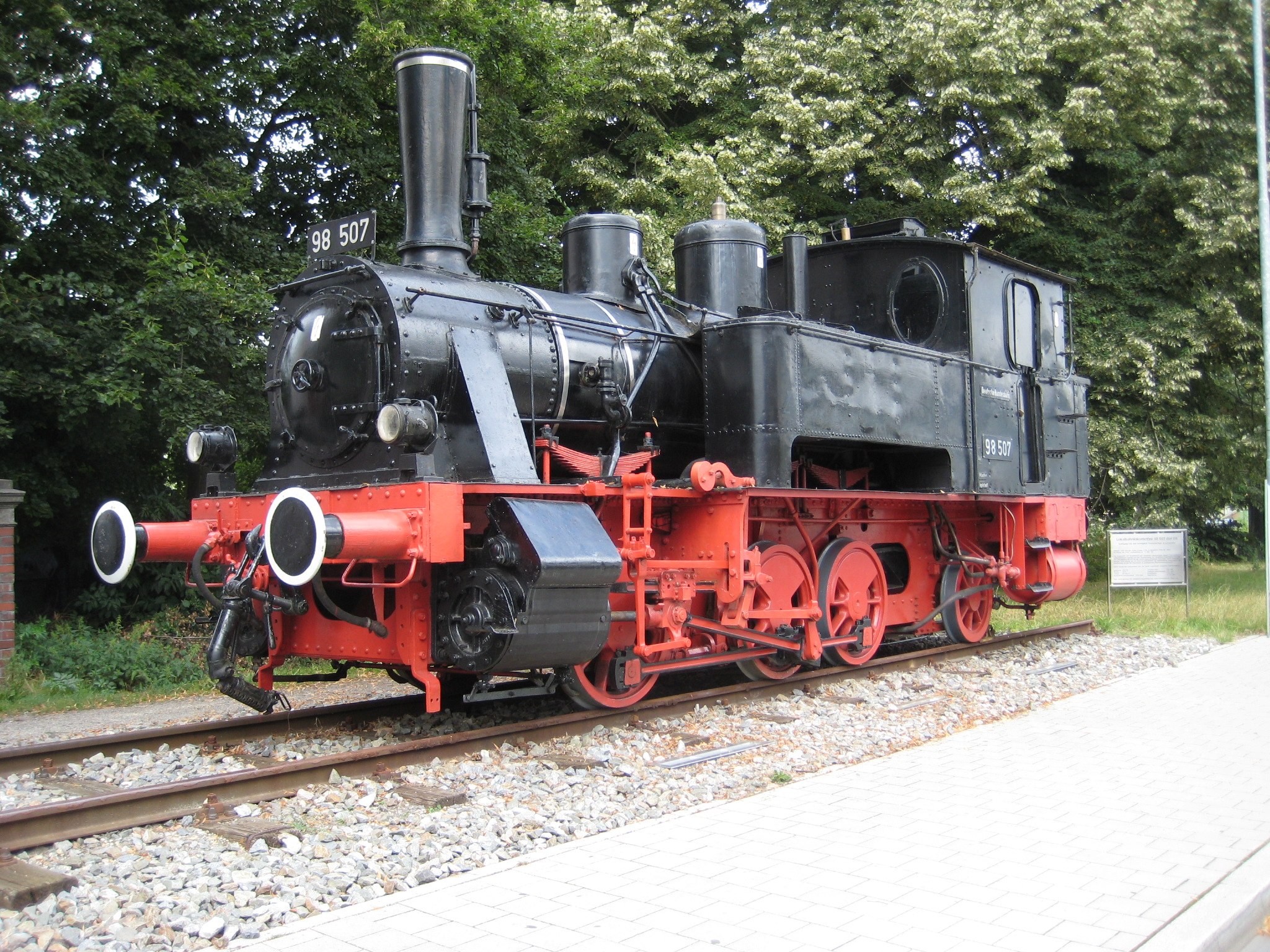
- Bavarian D XI
Type and origin
- Builder: Krauss, Maffei
- Build date: 1895–1914
- Total produced: D XI: 139; PtL3/4: 8
Specifications
- Configuration
  - Whyte: 0-6-2T
- Gauge: 1,435 mm (4 ft 8 1/2 in)
- Driver dia.: 1,006 mm (3 ft 3 5/8 in)
- Trailing dia.: 800 mm (2 ft 7 1/2 in)
- Length
  - Over beams: 9,288 or 9,306 mm (30 ft 5 3/4 in or 30 ft 6 1/2 in)
- Axle load: 10.9 t (10.7 long tons; 12.0 short tons)
- Adhesive weight: 32.6 t (32.1 long tons; 35.9 short tons)
- Service weight: 40.2 t (39.6 long tons; 44.3 short tons)
- Fuel capacity: 1.5 or 1.8 t (3,300 or 4,000 lb) coal
- Water cap.: 4.3 m^{3} (950 imp gal; 1,100 US gal)
- Boiler pressure: 12 kgf/cm^{2} (1,180 kPa; 171 lbf/in^{2})
- Heating surface
  - Firebox: 1.34 m^{2} (14.4 sq ft)
  - Evaporative: 66.63 m^{2} (717.2 sq ft)
- Cylinders: 2
- Cylinder size: 375 mm (14 3/4 in)
- Piston stroke: 508 mm (20 in)
Performance figures
- Maximum speed: 45 km/h (28 mph)
- Indicated power: 235 kW (320 PS; 315 hp)
Career
- Numbers: K.Bay.Sts.E: 1991–2050, 2701–2761, 2765–2782, 2762–2764, 2783–2787; DRG: 98 411 – 98 556, 98 561 – 98 568; ÖBB 791.01–791.04
- Retired: 1960

The Bavarian Class D XI engines were branch line (Lokalbahn) saturated steam locomotives built for service with the Royal Bavarian State Railways (Königlich Bayerische Staatsbahn).

== History ==
The state railway procured 139 examples between 1895 and 1912; it was the most numerous Bavarian branch line locomotive. Both Krauss and Maffei supplied three prototypes each and both were later involved in the production batches.

Eight locomotives of the same type were supplied by Krauss in 1900 to the Lokalbahn AG (Lokalbahn Aktien-Gesellschaft or LAG), which later sold them to the Bavarian state railway, where they were given the numbers 2507 to 2512. A further three locomotives were supplied by Krauss to the South German Electric Branch Lines (AG Süddeutsche elektrische Lokalbahnen) that was taken over in 1904 by the LAG; again these locomotives were sold to the state railway. They were given the numbers 2762–2764. These machines were designated as Class PtL 3/4 under the new classification scheme, but did not differ significantly from the newer Class D XI engines. Another five PtL 3/4 were procured by the state railway in 1914 and given the numbers 2783–2787.

Three of these locomotives were also produced for the Palatinate Railway (Pfalzbahn) as the T 4.II, but these had different dimensions, including smaller driving and carrying wheels.

The Deutsche Reichsbahn took over all 147 vehicles in 1925 as the DRG Class 98.4-5. The D XI engines were given the numbers 98 411–556 and the PtL 3/4 machines the numbers 98 561–568. About half the locomotives were retired between 1931 and 1933.

Two machines remained after the Second World War in Czechoslovakia and four in Austria. The latter were numbers 98 500, 514, 546 und 549, which were given the numbers 791.01–04 by the Austrian Federal Railway (Österreichische Bundesbahn or ÖBB). They were taken out of service in 1957.

The Deutsche Bundesbahn took over 56 engines in 1945. The last loco was taken out of service in 1960 in Nuremberg and transferred to Ingolstadt. There it was set up as a memorial in front of the station in 1968. This sole surviving example of the Bavarian D XI is cared for today by the Apian-Gymnasium at Ingolstadt.

A 1:10 scale model of this locomotive was built between 1962 and 1964 in the training workshops of the Weiden depot (AW Weiden) and is today in the railway museum of Weiden in der Oberpfalz.

== Design ==
These locomotives were among the first to be fitted with a Krauss-Helmholtz bogie. Some received a counter-pressure brake of the Riggenbach type.

The five PtL 3/4 locomotives differ from the previous ones in having a longer length over buffers of 9,306 mm, a slightly lower indicated power of 310 PSi and a slightly greater coal capacity of 1.8 tons.

== LMKO 1 to 11, LAG 62 to 64 ==
For the construction of the Murnau–Kohlgrub–Oberammergau Local Railway (LMKO), the South German Electric Local Railway Company (Aktien-Gesellschaft Süddeutsche elektrische Lokalbahnen) procured two locomotives from Krauss with serial numbers 3930 and 3931, which were delivered in August 1899. When it was realised that the electrification of the route would not be completed in time for the 1900 Oberammergau Passion Play, further locomotives of the D XI class were procured in two batches (factory numbers 4129 to 4131 and 4260 to 4265). The eleven locomotives were given operating numbers LMKO 1 to 11.

On the bankruptcy of the South German Electric Local Railway Company in October 1901, the Royal Bavarian State Railways took over services between Murnau and Oberammergau. As a result, locomotives LMKO 4 to 11 were taken over by the state railways and given operating numbers 2505 to 2512.

The remaining three locomotives went to Lokalbahn Aktien-Gesellschaft (LAG) in 1904 when they bought the Murnau–Oberammergau line. The LAG gave them operating numbers 62 to 64 and, in addition to their primary line, they were also used on the Murnau–Garmisch-Partenkirchen Localbahn line. On the nationalization of the Murnau–Garmisch-Partenkirchen railway in 1908, these three locomotives also became the property of the Royal Bavarian State Railways and were classified as PtL 3/4 with operating numbers 2762 to 2764.

=== Overview ===
Works number	Year of manufacture	Operating number LMKO	Operating number LAG	Operating number K.Bay.Sts.B.	Operating number Deutsche Reichsbahn
3930	1899	1	62	2762	98 561
3931	1899	2	63	2763	98 562
4129	1900	3	64	2764	98 563
4130	1900	4		2711	98 488
4131	1900	5		2712	98 489
4260	1900	6		2705	98 482
4261	1900	7		2706	98 483
4262	1900	8		2707	98 484
4263	1900	9		2708	98 485
4264	1900	10		2709	98 486
4265	1900	11		2710	98 487

=== Trivium ===
After the three locomotives LAG 62 to 64 were transferred to the Royal Bavarian State Railways, their old LAG operating numbers were incorporated into their new ones. For example, no. 62 became no. 2762.

== See also ==
- Royal Bavarian State Railways
- List of Bavarian locomotives and railbuses

== Bibliography ==
- Weisbrod, Manfred; Petznik, Wolfgang (1981). Dampflokomotiven deutscher Eisenbahnen, Baureihe 97–99 (EFA 1.4) (in German) (2nd ed.). Düsseldorf: Alba. pp. 45–50. ISBN 3-87094-087-5.
