= Palatine Nos. 26–63 =

Pfalzbahn 26–29, 36–41, 46–49, and 60–63
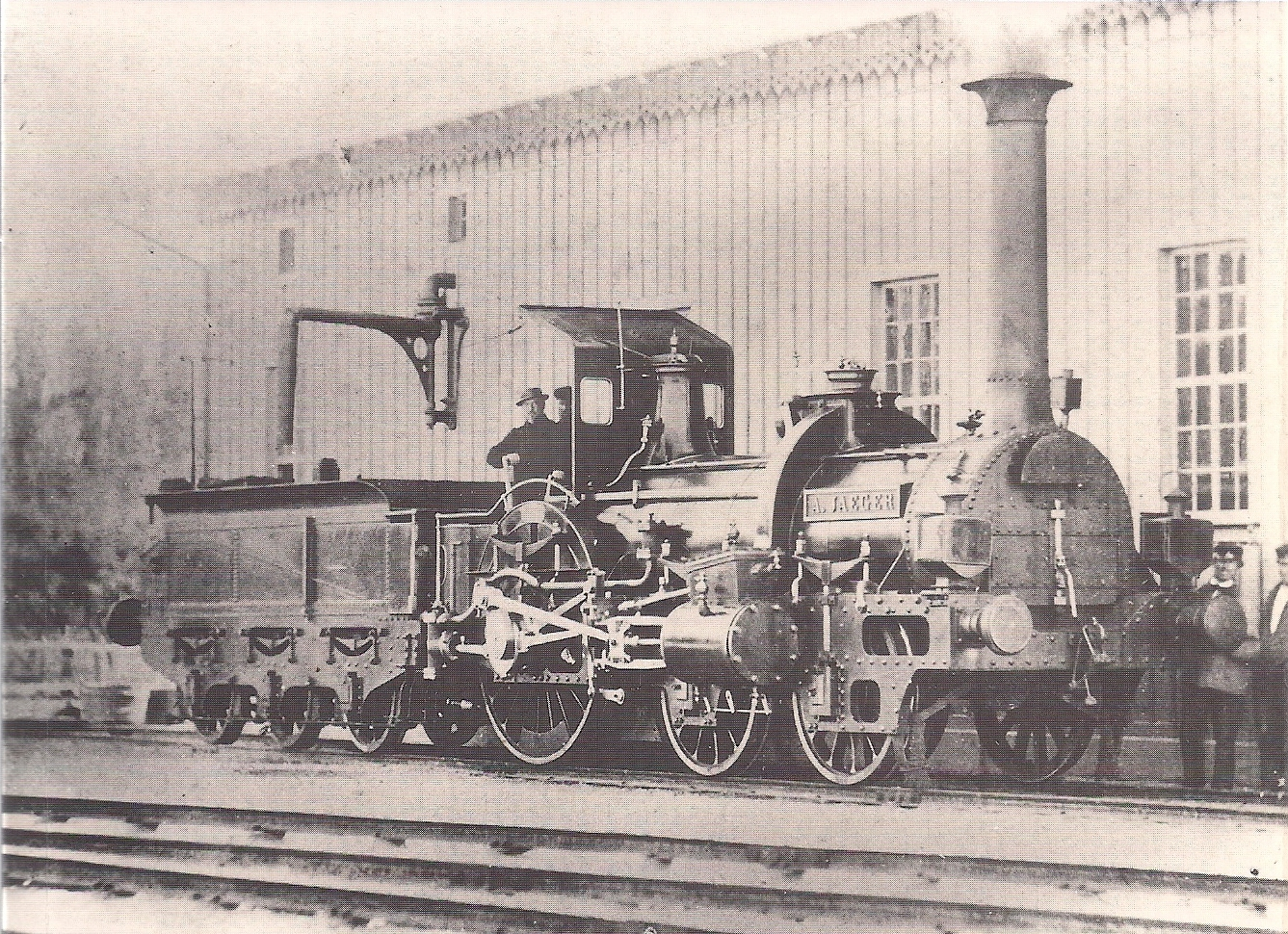
- Pfalzbahn 61 A. JAEGER (Esslingen 622 of 1863) in Ludwigshafen in 1865
Type and origin
- Power type: Steam
- Builder: Maffei (4); Esslingen (14)
- Serial number: Maffei: 132–135; Esslingen: 265–270, 295–296, 431–432, 621–624
- Build date: 1853–1864
- Total produced: 18
Specifications
- Configuration
  - Whyte: 4-2-0
  - UIC: 2A
- Gauge: 1,435 mm (4 ft 8 1/2 in)
- Leading dia.: 1,220 mm (4 ft 0 in)
- Driver dia.: 1,830 mm (6 ft 0 in)
- Wheelbase
  - Engine: 3,962 mm (13 ft 0 in)
- Axle load: 10.2 tonnes (10.0 long tons; 11.2 short tons)
- Adhesive weight: 10.2 tonnes (10.0 long tons; 11.2 short tons)
- Service weight: 24.2 tonnes (23.8 long tons; 26.7 short tons)
- Fuel type: 3 T 5,7
- Fuel capacity: 3.2 tonnes (3.1 long tons; 3.5 short tons)
- Water cap.: 5.7 m^{3} (1,250 imp gal; 1,510 US gal)
- Firebox
  - Grate area: 0.98 m^{2} (10.5 sq ft)
- Boiler pressure: 6.2 bar (6.3 kgf/cm^{2}; 90 psi)
- Heating surface
  - Firebox: 5.3 m^{2} (57 sq ft)
  - Tubes: 63.3 m^{2} (681 sq ft)
  - Total surface: 68.6 m^{2} (738 sq ft)
- Cylinders: Two, outside
- Cylinder size: 356 mm × 610 mm (14 in × 24 in)
Performance figures
- Maximum speed: 75 km/h (47 mph)
Career
- Operators: Palatine Railways
- Numbers: 26–29, 36–41, 46–49, and 60–63

The Palatine Nos. 26 to 63 were steam locomotives of the Palatine Railways (Pfalzbahn) and typical express train, tender locomotives of the Crampton type with wheel arrangement 2A. Both running axles were housed in the main frame, the driving axle was behind the vertical boiler. This enabled driving wheels with a diameter of 1,830 mm (6 ft 0 in) to be fitted without placing the boiler higher than was customary at the time. As a further feature, the locomotive number 28 Pfalz ("Palatinate") had weather protection for the engine driver and fireman, which was not common at the time.

Four units were made by Maffei in 1853, and fourteen by Keßler (Maschinenfabrik Esslingen) between 1855 and 1864. The Maffei locomotives had the regulator housing in the middle of the boiler, a larger smokebox than those from Keßler, a smooth vertical boiler and steam chest arranged over the cylinder. The locomotives were equipped with Type 3 T 5.7 tender.

In 1925 the third example of the series, number 28 PFALZ was replicated in the Weiden repair shop. This replica is now on loan from the Nuremberg Transport Museum in the Neustadt/Weinstrasse Railway Museum.

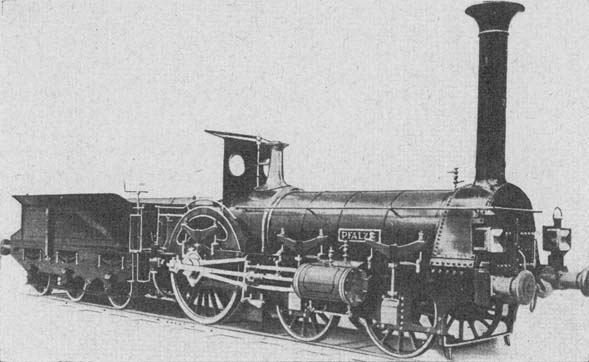
Number 28 PFALZ (Maffei 134 of 1853)

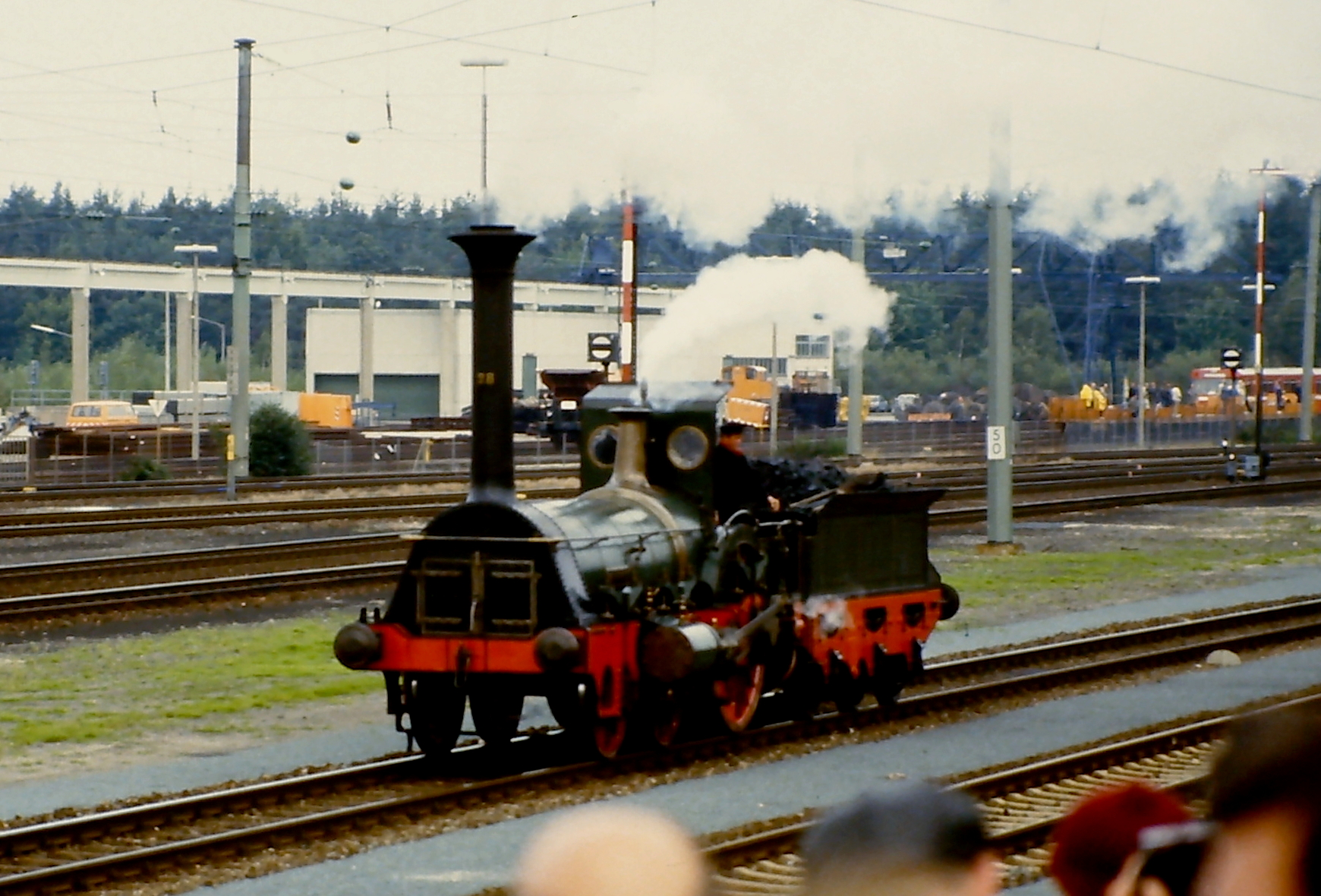
Replica of DIE PFALZ, Nuremberg, 1985
