= Palatine P 3.I =

Palatine P 3^{I} DRG Class 14.1
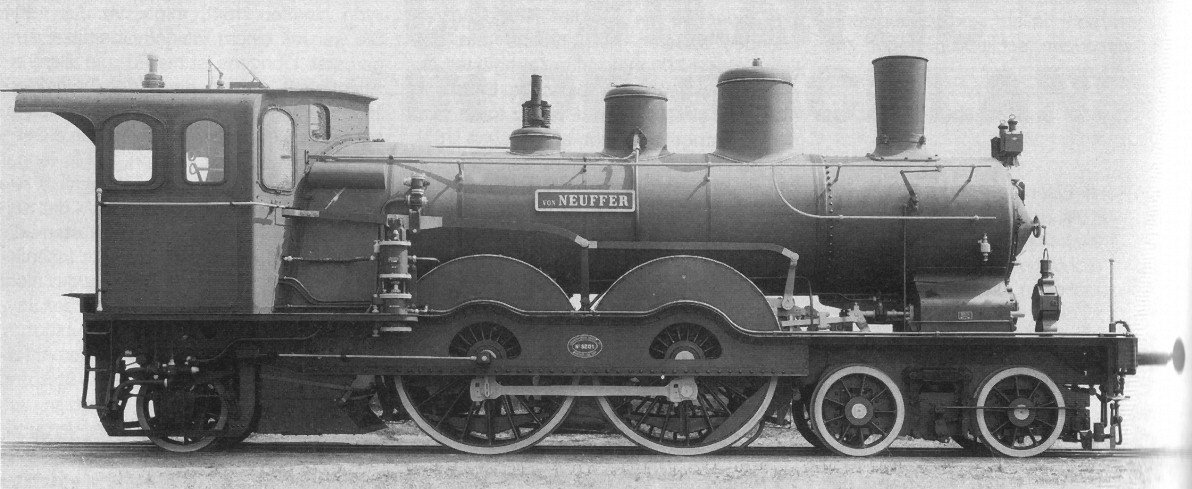
- P 3^{I} No. 119 von Neuffer (Krauss 5201 of 1904)
Type and origin
- Power type: Steam
- Builder: Lokomotivfabrik Krauss & Comp.
- Serial number: 3755–3760, 4076, 4238–4239, 4355–4356, 5201
- Build date: 1898–1904
- Total produced: 12
- Rebuild date: 1913
Specifications
- Configuration
  - Whyte: 4-4-2
  - UIC: 2′B1′ n2, later 2′B1′ n4v
- Gauge: 1,435 mm (4 ft 8 1/2 in)
- Leading dia.: 950 mm (3 ft 1 1/2 in)
- Driver dia.: 1,980 mm (6 ft 6 in)
- Trailing dia.: 950 mm (3 ft 1 1/2 in)
- Wheelbase: new: 14,800 mm (48 ft 6 3/4 in); rebuilt: 15,125 mm (49 ft 7 1/2 in)
  - Engine: new: 8,700 mm (28 ft 6 1/2 in); rebuilt: 9,025 mm (29 ft 7 1/4 in)
- Length
  - Over buffers: 19,070 mm (62 ft 6 3/4 in)
- Axle load: 15.0 t (14.8 long tons; 16.5 short tons)
- Adhesive weight: 30.0 t (29.5 long tons; 33.1 short tons)
- Service weight: 59.6 t (58.7 long tons; 65.7 short tons)
- Tender type: 3 T 16
- Fuel type: Coal
- Fuel capacity: 6 tonnes (5.9 long tons; 6.6 short tons)
- Water cap.: 16.0 m^{3} (3,500 imp gal; 4,200 US gal)
- Firebox
  - Grate area: 2.81 m^{2} (30.2 sq ft)
- Boiler
  - Tube plates: 4,650 mm (15 ft 3 in)
- Boiler pressure: 13 bar (13.3 kgf/cm^{2}; 189 lbf/in^{2})
- Heating surface
  - Firebox: 10.93 m^{2} (117.6 sq ft)
  - Tubes: new: 160.80 m^{2} (1,730.8 sq ft); rebuilt: 157.69 m^{2} (1,697.4 sq ft)
  - Total surface: new: 171.73 m^{2} (1,848.5 sq ft); rebuilt: 168.62 m^{2} (1,815.0 sq ft)
- Cylinders: Two inside, later four compound
- Cylinder size: new: 490 mm × 570 mm (19 5/16 in × 22 7/16 in)
- High-pressure cylinder: rebuilt: 360 mm × 570 mm (14 3/16 in × 22 7/16 in)
- Low-pressure cylinder: rebuilt: 580 mm × 630 mm (22 13/16 in × 24 13/16 in)
Performance figures
- Maximum speed: 100 km/h (62 mph)
Career
- Numbers: Pfalz: 221–226, 93, 227–230, 119; DRG: 14 101–105
- Retired: 1926

The German steam locomotives of Palatine Class P 3^{I} were operated by the Palatinate Railway and were the first engines in Germany with a 4-4-2 (Atlantic) wheel arrangement. The two-cylinder saturated steam locomotives with inside cylinders had in addition to an inside bar frame a characteristic outer frame for the rear part of the locomotive, that partly covered the driving wheels. The valve gear was of the Joy type.

In 1898 and 1899 Krauss initially built eleven locomotives; in 1904 a twelfth followed that was equipped with a Pielock superheater. Although the P 3^{I} locomotivess met their intended performance criteria, they were soon overtaxed by increasingly long trains.

The Palatinate Railway decided therefore on an unusual conversion: in 1913 the two-cylinder engine was converted into a four-cylinder compound engine by the addition of two outside cylinders, the inner ones becoming the high-pressure cylinders. However they did not achieve the higher performance required, just a lower fuel consumption of around 15%.

The Deutsche Reichsbahn took over five of these locomotives as DRG Class 14.1 with numbers 14 101 to 14 105, but by 1926 they were retired from service. Also grouped into Class 14.1 were the Bavarian S 2/5s.

The locomotives were equipped with tenders of the Bavarian Class 3 T 16.

== See also ==
- Royal Bavarian State Railways
- Palatinate Railway
- List of Bavarian locomotives and railbuses
- List of Palatine locomotives and railbuses

== Literature ==
- Hütter, Ingo (2009). Die Dampflokomotiven der Baureihen 01 bis 45 der DRG, DRB, DB, und DR (in German). Werl: DGEG Medien. p. 141. ISBN 978-3-937189-45-1.
- Mühl, Albert (1982). Die Pfalzbahn: Geschichte, Betrieb und Fahrzeuge der pfälzischen Eisenbahnen. Theiss. 252 pp.
- Schnabel, Heinz (1987). Eisenbahn-Fahrzeug-Archiv Band 2.5: Lokomotiven bayerischer Eisenbahnen (in German). Düsseldorf: Alba Publikation Alf Teloeken GmbH + Co KG. pp. 257–280, 385. ISBN 3-87094-105-7.
- Weisbrod, Manfred; Müller, Hans; Petznik, Wolfgang (1976). Dampflokomotiven deutscher Eisenbahnen, Baureihe 01–39 (EFA 1.1) (in German) (3rd ed.). Düsseldorf: Alba Buchverlag. pp. 94–96. ISBN 3-87094-081-6.
