= Neustadt/Weinstrasse Railway Museum =

Railway museum in Germany

Coordinates: 49°20′58″N 8°8′21″E

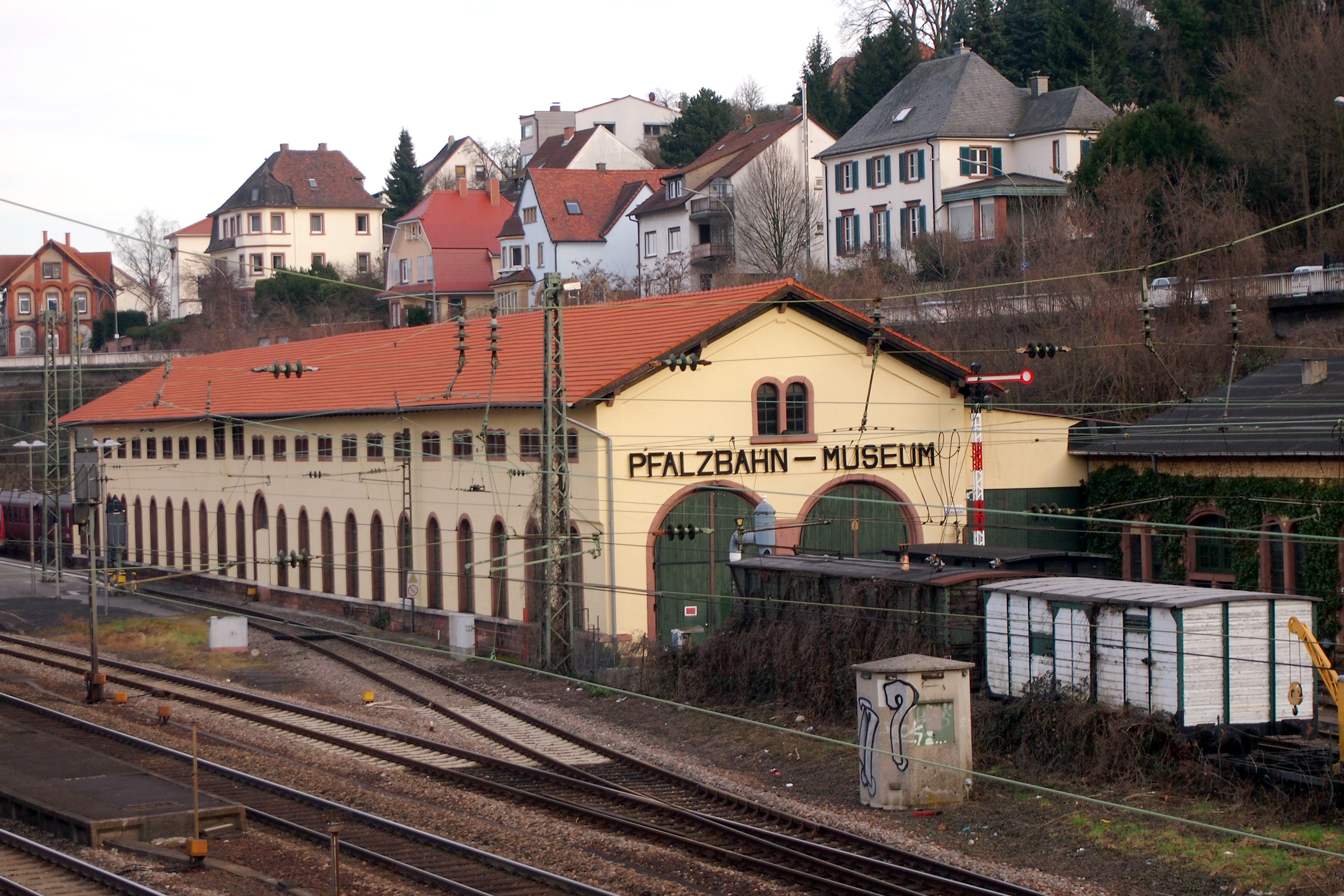
The locomotive shed of the railway museum

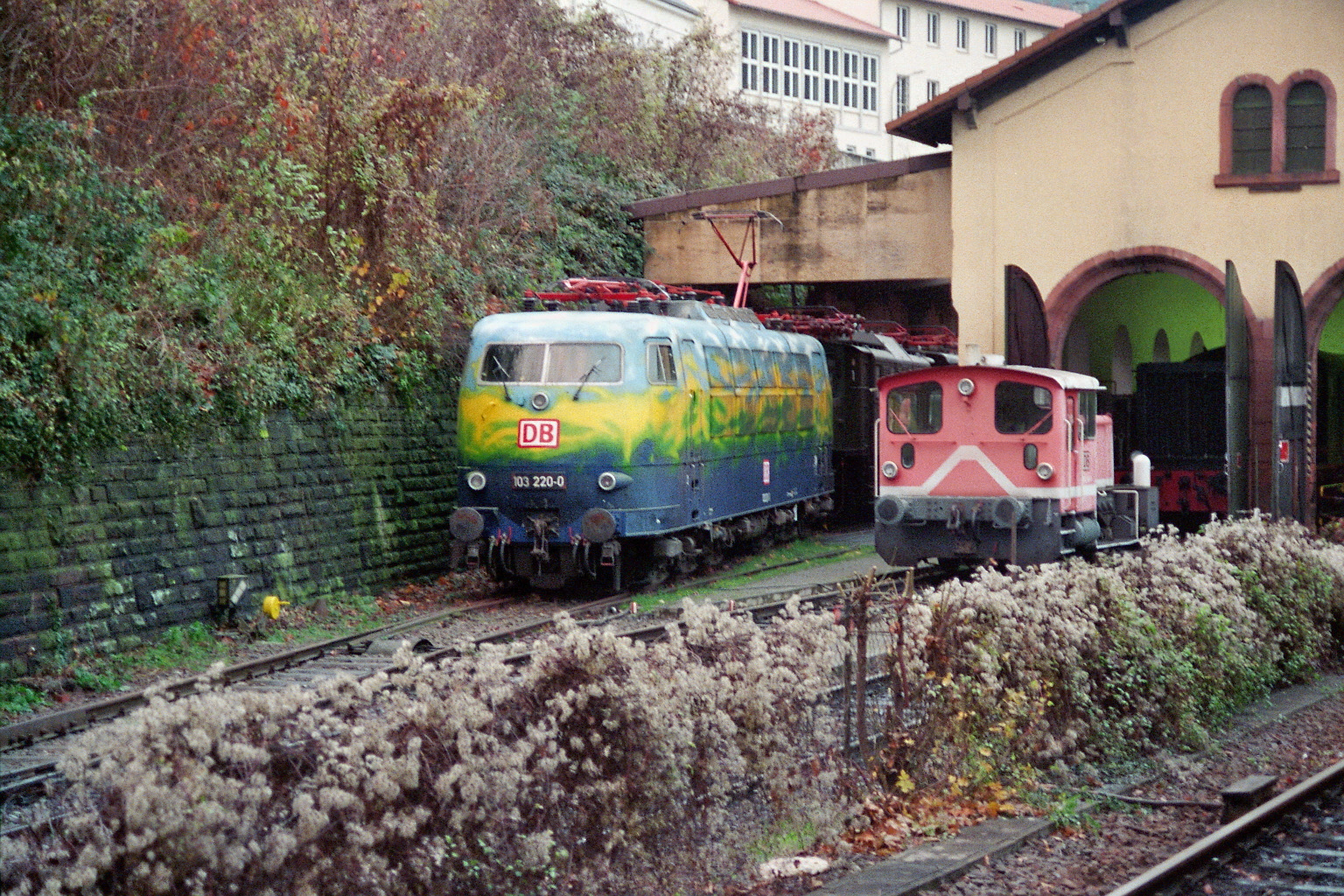
Locomotives in the Museum, seen from the steps of the footbridge in Neustadt/Weinstraße station

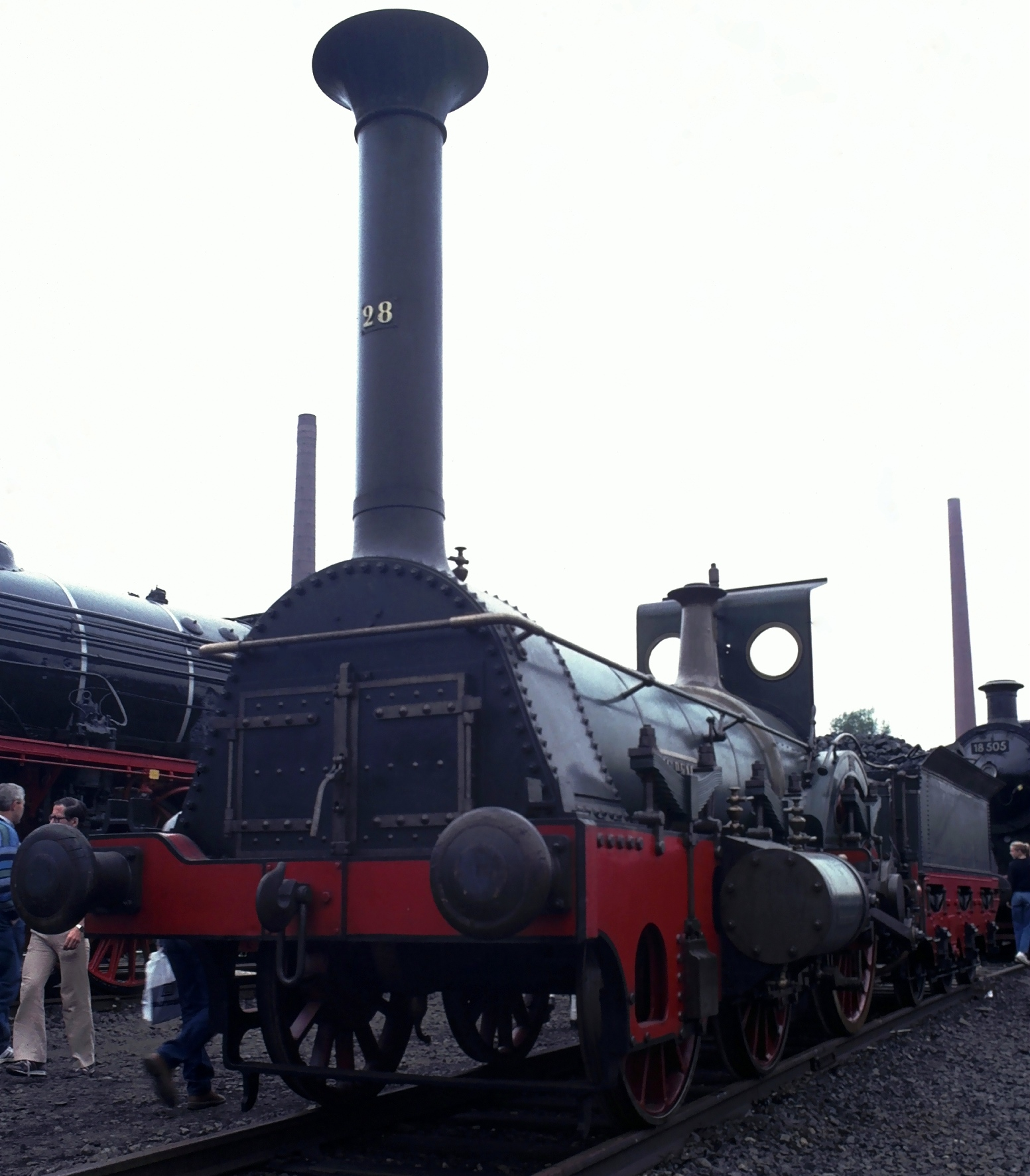
Replica of the Pfalz

The Neustadt/Weinstrasse Railway Museum (Eisenbahnmuseum Neustadt/Weinstraße) is one of the two railway museums run by the German Railway History Company, (Deutsche Gesellschaft für Eisenbahngeschichte) or DGEG. It is located in the station at Neustadt an der Weinstraße. The other one is the Bochum Dahlhausen Railway Museum.

The Neustadt/Weinstrasse Railway Museum is housed in the historic locomotive shed of the Palatinate Railway, built in the very earliest days of the railways. in what was then the Bavarian Palatinate or Pfalz. The engine shed is still largely in its original condition.

== Exhibits ==
The focus of the Neustadt/Weinstrasse Railway Museum is vehicles of the former state railways in southern Germany. For example, the two remaining examples of steam locomotives from the time of the Palatine Railways are preserved here still in their original state: the T 1 Schaidt and a Palatine T 5. In addition a replica of an express train locomotive from the early railway period, (Die Pfalz), a Crampton engine, is on display. Vehicles from the Deutsche Reichsbahn era are the E 17 and ET 11. In addition the museum still has a range of passenger train coaches and goods wagons of the former Baden and Royal Württemberg State Railways, as well as the later standard DRG wagons. There is also a 1942 steam-powered rotary snow plough in the fleet.

== Little Cuckoo Railway ==
Restoration and maintenance, upkeep of the buildings and operation of the associated museum railway are carried out by the society members. The preserved railway, called the Little Cuckoo Railway (Kuckucksbähnel), starts at Neustadt and heads into the Palatine Forest, west of Neustadt.

== See also ==
- History of rail transport in Germany
- Royal Bavarian State Railways
- Palatinate Railway
- List of Palatine locomotives and railbuses
- DGEG
