= Bavarian BB I =

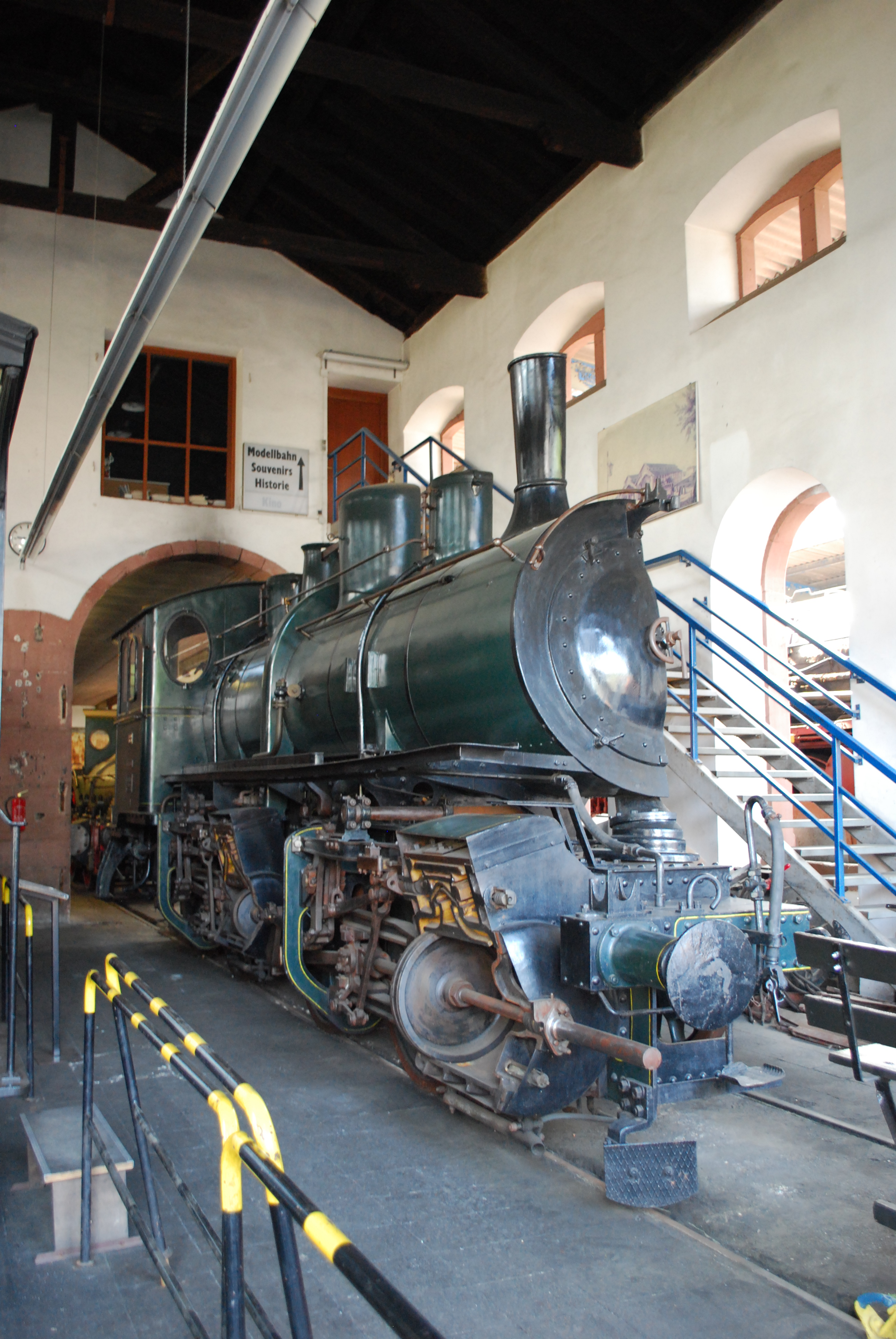
Type and origin
- Builder: Maffei
- Build date: 1896
- Total produced: 1
Specifications
- Configuration
  - Whyte: 0-4-4-0
- Gauge: 1,435 mm (4 ft 8 1/2 in)
- Driver dia.: 1,340 millimetres (4 ft 4 3/4 in)
- Length
  - Over beams: 16,991 or 17,894 mm (55 ft 9 in or 58 ft 8 1/2 in)
- Axle load: 14.2 t (14.0 long tons; 15.7 short tons)
- Adhesive weight: 55.6 t (54.7 long tons; 61.3 short tons)
- Service weight: 55.6 t (54.7 long tons; 61.3 short tons)
- Water cap.: 13.8 or 18.0 m^{3} (3,000 or 4,000 imp gal; 3,600 or 4,800 US gal)
- Boiler pressure: 14 kgf/cm^{2} (1.37 MPa; 199 psi)
- Heating surface
  - Firebox: 2.07 m^{2} (22.3 sq ft)
  - Evaporative: 123.00 m^{2} (1,324.0 sq ft)
- Cylinders: 4
- High-pressure cylinder: 415 mm (16 5/16 in)
- Low-pressure cylinder: 635 mm (25 in)
- Piston stroke: 630 mm (24 13/16 in)
Performance figures
- Maximum speed: 45 or 65 km/h (28 or 40 mph)
Career
- Numbers: Bavaria: 2100
- Retired: 1924

The BB I was a steam locomotive with the Royal Bavarian State Railways (Königlich Bayerische Staatsbahn).

This one-off loco would have been given the operating number 55 7101 by the Reichsbahn in their initial renumbering plan, but in the final one it did not appear as it had been retired in 1924. It can be seen in section today in the Neustadt/Weinstrasse Railway Museum.

The engine was initially equipped with a Bavarian 3 T 13,8 tender, later replaced by a Class 2'2' T 18.

== See also ==
- Royal Bavarian State Railways
- List of Bavarian locomotives and railbuses
