= Palatine G 3/3 =

Palatine G 3/3 DRG Class 53^{5}
Type and origin
- Power type: Steam
- Builder: Maffei
- Serial number: 4543–4546
- Build date: 1914
- Total produced: 4
Specifications
- Configuration
  - Whyte: 0-6-0
  - UIC: C n2v
- Gauge: 1,435 mm (4 ft 8 1/2 in)
- Driver dia.: 1,300 mm (4 ft 3 1/8 in)
- Wheelbase
  - Coupled: 3,270 mm (10 ft 8 3/4 in)
  - Tender: 2,896 mm (9 ft 6 in)
  - incl. tender: 10,826 mm (35 ft 6 1/4 in)
- Length
  - Over buffers: 14,835 mm (48 ft 8 in)
- Axle load: 16.8 tonnes (16.5 long tons; 18.5 short tons)
- Adhesive weight: 50.6 tonnes (49.8 long tons; 55.8 short tons)
- Service weight: 50.6 tonnes (49.8 long tons; 55.8 short tons)
- Tender type: 2 T 8,2
- Fuel type: Coal
- Fuel capacity: 4.8 tonnes (4.7 long tons; 5.3 short tons)
- Water cap.: 8.2 m^{3} (1,800 imp gal; 2,200 US gal)
- Firebox
  - Grate area: 2.2 m^{2} (24 sq ft)
- Boiler
  - Pitch: c. 2,600 mm (8 ft 6 1/4 in)
  - Tube plates: 3,450 mm (11 ft 3 3/4 in)
  - Small tubes: 50 mm (1 15/16 in)
- Boiler pressure: 15 bar (15.3 kgf/cm^{2}; 218 psi)
- Heating surface
  - Firebox: 10.4 m^{2} (112 sq ft)
  - Tubes: 118.7 m^{2} (1,278 sq ft)
  - Total surface: 129.1 m^{2} (1,390 sq ft)
- Cylinders: 2 (compound)
- High-pressure cylinder: 490 mm × 635 mm (19 5/16 in × 25 in)
- Low-pressure cylinder: 730 mm × 635 mm (28 3/4 in × 25 in)
- Valve gear: Heusinger valve gear
Performance figures
- Maximum speed: 45 km/h (28 mph)
Career
- Numbers: Pfalz: 1–4; DRG 53 501 – 53 504
- First run: 1919
- Retired: October 1924
- Disposition: All scrapped

The Palatine G 3/3 was a steam-driven, goods train, tender locomotive on the Palatinate network of the Royal Bavarian State Railways.

== Description ==
The four steam engines originally ordered for the ONCF in Morocco were procured in 1919 by Palatine Railways from the firm of Maffei. They stood out at that time because of their high boiler location and a high axle load. Two of these engines had steel fireboxes. As a result of their unusual design they could not be deployed with other engines which led, in 1924, to their early retirement, although they were incorporated by the Deutsche Reichsbahn in their first renumbering plan in 1923, being provisionally allocated operating numbers 53 501–504.
