= Palatine G 1.I =

Palatine G 1^{I}
Type and origin
- Power type: Steam
- Builder: Maffei
- Serial number: 128–131
- Build date: 1853
- Total produced: 4
Specifications
- Configuration
  - Whyte: 2-4-0
  - UIC: 1B
- Gauge: 1,435 mm (4 ft 8 1/2 in)
- Leading dia.: 945 mm (3 ft 1 1/4 in)
- Driver dia.: 1,216 mm (3 ft 11 7/8 in)
- Wheelbase
  - Engine: 3,048 mm (10 ft 0 in)
  - Coupled: 1,524 mm (5 ft 0 in)
- Length
  - Over buffers: c. 14,000 mm (45 ft 11 1/4 in)
- Axle load: 8.4 tonnes (8.3 long tons; 9.3 short tons)
- Adhesive weight: 16.8 tonnes (16.5 long tons; 18.5 short tons)
- Service weight: 24.0 tonnes (23.6 long tons; 26.5 short tons)
- Tender type: 3 T 5,5
- Fuel capacity: 3.0 tonnes (3.0 long tons; 3.3 short tons)
- Water cap.: 5.5 m^{3} (1,210 imp gal; 1,450 US gal)
- Firebox
  - Grate area: 0.98 m^{2} (10.5 sq ft)
- Boiler
  - Tube plates: 3,660 mm (12 ft 0 in)
  - Small tubes: 43 mm (1 11/16 in), 141 off
- Boiler pressure: 6.3 bar (6.42 kgf/cm^{2}; 91.4 psi)
- Heating surface
  - Firebox: 5.3 m^{2} (57 sq ft)
  - Tubes and flues: 69.3 m^{2} (746 sq ft)
  - Total surface: 74.6 m^{2} (803 sq ft)
- Cylinders: 2
- Cylinder size: 356 mm × 610 mm (14 in × 24 in)
Performance figures
- Maximum speed: 45 km/h (28 mph)
Career
- Numbers: Pfalz: 22–25
- Retired: c. 1880

The Palatine Class G 1^{I} steam locomotives were goods train engines belonging to the Palatine Railways.

== Description ==
These engines were the first Type Hall unites built by Maffei. In addition they had an eccentric crank of the Hall type. This was partly external and partly internal, a feature of engines in Bavaria and the Palatinate. The boiler was entirely dome-less and had a semi-circular outer firebox above. They were equipped with Type 3 T 6 tenders.
