= Palatine Nos. 1–8, 21 =

Nos. 1–8, 21 (Pfalz)
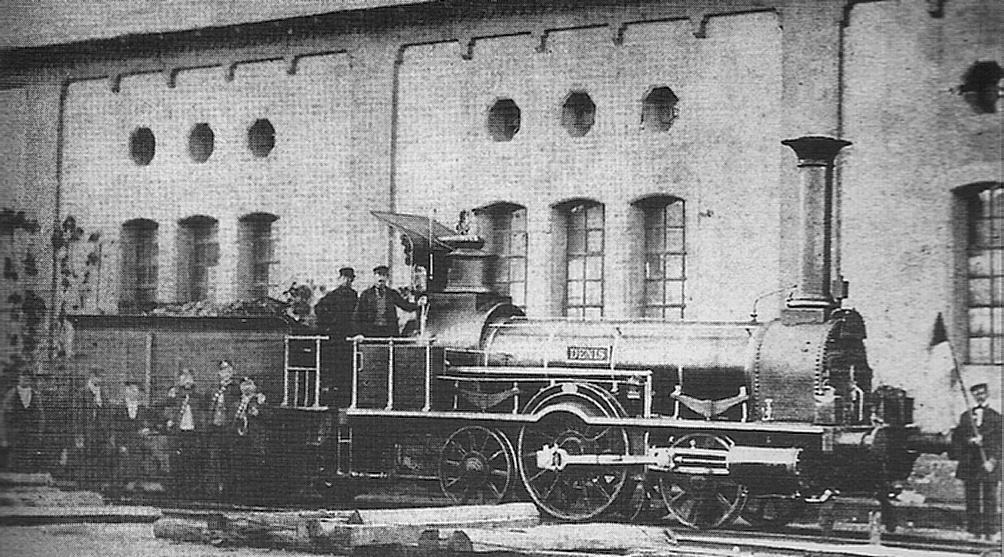
Type and origin
- Power type: Steam
- Builder: Emil Keßler (5), Maffei (4)
- Serial number: Keßler: 56–57, 76–77, 200; Maffei: 10–13
- Build date: 1846–1851
- Total produced: 9
Specifications
- Configuration
  - Whyte: 2-2-2
  - UIC: 1A1 n2
- Gauge: 1,435 mm (4 ft 8 1/2 in)
- Driver dia.: 1,524 mm (5 ft 0 in)
- Wheelbase
  - Engine: 3,048 or 3,175 mm (10 ft 0 in or 10 ft 5 in)
  - Tender: 3 T 5: 2,700 mm (8 ft 10 1/4 in) equally divided
- Height: 4,166 mm (13 ft 8 in)
- Axle load: 7.6 t
- Loco weight: 21.3 tonnes (21.0 long tons; 23.5 short tons)
- Tender type: 2 T 4,2 or 3 T 5
- Fuel type: Coal
- Fuel capacity: 3 tonnes (3.0 long tons; 3.3 short tons)
- Water cap.: 4.2 or 5.0 m^{3} (920 or 1,100 imp gal; 1,100 or 1,300 US gal)
- Firebox
  - Grate area: 0.85 m^{2} (9.1 sq ft)
- Boiler
  - Tube plates: 3,810 mm (12 ft 6 in)
- Boiler pressure: 6.2 bar (6.3 kgf/cm^{2}; 90 psi)
- Heating surface: 69.00 m^{2} (742.7 sq ft)
- Cylinders: 2
- Cylinder size: 318 mm × 559 mm (12 1/2 in × 22 in)
Career
- Operators: Palatine Ludwig Railway Company
- Numbers: 1–8, 21
- First run: 1847
- Retired: 1879 to 1883

The steam locomotives with operating numbers 1–8 and 21 belonged to the Palatinate Ludwig Railway. They were the first locomotives built for this company. The locomotives manufactured from 1846 onwards were taken out of service by 1883.

== History ==
Between 1846 and 1847, the Palatinate Ludwig Railway Company procured four locomotives from the Emil Keßler in Karlsruhe. They were numbers 1 HAARDT, 2 VOGESUS, 3, DENIS, and 4 ALWENS. In 1847 four identical locomotives (5 HUMMEL, 6 RHEIN, 7 LAUTER, 8 QUEICH) were acquired from Maffei. In 1851 the ninth locomotive KOENIG LUDWIG followed, again delivered by Keßler, with works number 200. This was given the operating number 21. The first four locomotives delivered were decommissioned in 1879. The KÖNIG LUDWIG was in service until 1883.

== Design features ==
The locomotives had an internal forked bed.

Locomotives 1 to 8 had a Long Boiler without a steam dome and were fitted with an overhanging vertical boiler. The vertical boiler had a four-sided dome. On the boiler sat two spring valves (Federwaagventile). Engine no. 21 had a Kessler patent boiler (pear-shaped boiler). The slightly raised vertical boiler had a small steam dome. However, the patent boiler was later replaced by a boiler of standard construction. The long boiler was covered with wood. The boiler feed pumps were driven by return cranks.

The locomotives from Keßler and Maffei differed mainly in the arrangement and control of the regulator. In locomotives supplied by Keßler, the regulator was located in the smokebox and controlled by an external pull from the driver's cab. On Maffei locomotives, the control lever was in the right-hand wall of the vertical boiler's dome.

On delivery, the three wheel sets were centrally located under the boiler. This led to rocking movements. For this reason, the rear axle was moved 127 millimetres (5 in) to the rear and the overall wheelbase increased. The running wheels were cushioned by leaf spring packs on the running plate.

The external twin cylinder wet steam running gear was arranged horizontally and had an internal Stephenson valve gear.

The screw brake was on the tender and acted on tender wheels. The driver's cab consisted of a windshield that was extended upwards and to the side. The buffers were made of wood. On delivery, the sand box was in front of the driving wheels under the boiler. At the end of the 1860s it was moved to the boiler.

The locomotives had a tall sheet metal chimney. When the boiler was replaced, the goblet-shaped chimney of locomotive No. 21 was replaced by one of contemporary design.

== Literature ==
- Mühl, Albert (1982). Die Pfalzbahn: Geschichte, Betrieb und Fahrzeuge der pfälzischen Eisenbahnen. Theiss. 252 pp.
- Schnabel, Heinz (1987). Eisenbahn-Fahrzeug-Archiv Band 2.5: Lokomotiven bayerischer Eisenbahnen (in German). Düsseldorf: Alba Publikation Alf Teloeken GmbH + Co KG. pp. 239–241. ISBN 3-87094-105-7.
- Schnabel, Heinz (1992). Deutsches Lok-Archiv: Lokomotiven bayerischer Eisenbahnen (in German). Berlin: transpress. ISBN 3-344-70717-5.
