= Joseph Anton von Maffei =

German industrialist (1790–1870)

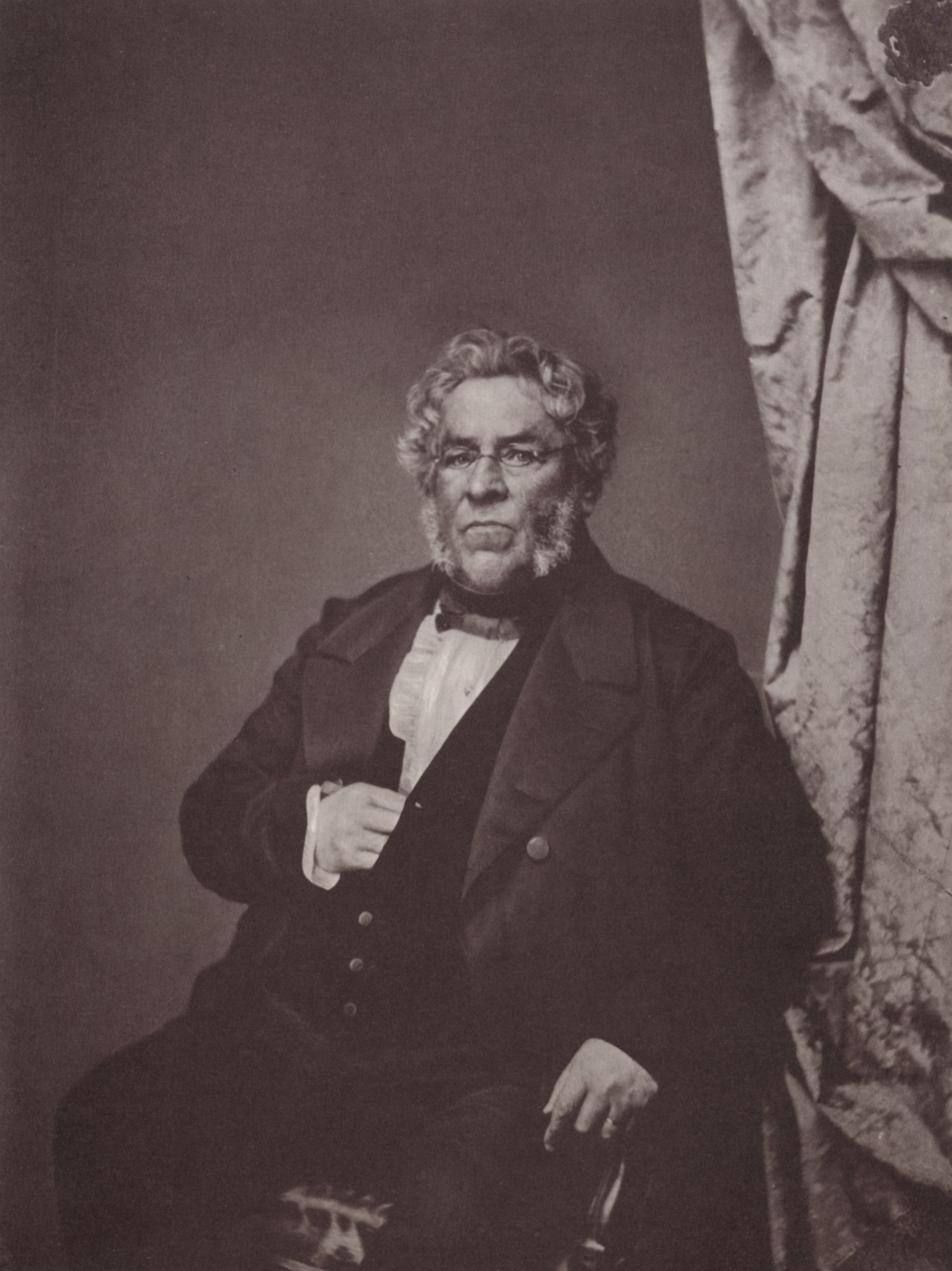
- Born: 4 September 1790; Munich
- Died: 1 September 1870 (aged 79); Munich
- Known for: Railway engineering

Joseph Anton Ritter von Maffei (4 September 1790 – 1 September 1870) was a German industrialist. Together with Joseph von Baader (1763–1835) and Theodor Freiherr von Cramer-Klett (1817–1884), Maffei was one of the three most important railway pioneers in Bavaria.

== Early life ==
Joseph Anton Maffei was born in Munich, in the Electorate of Bavaria, the son of an Italian tradesman from Verona. The Palazzo Maffei still stands today on the Piazza delle Erbe. His father came to Munich in order to run a tobacco wholesale business, that Joseph Anton Maffei continued. In 1835 Maffei was one of the founding shareholders of the Bavarian Mortgage and Discount Bank (Bayerische Hypotheken- und Wechselbank).

== Railway pioneer ==
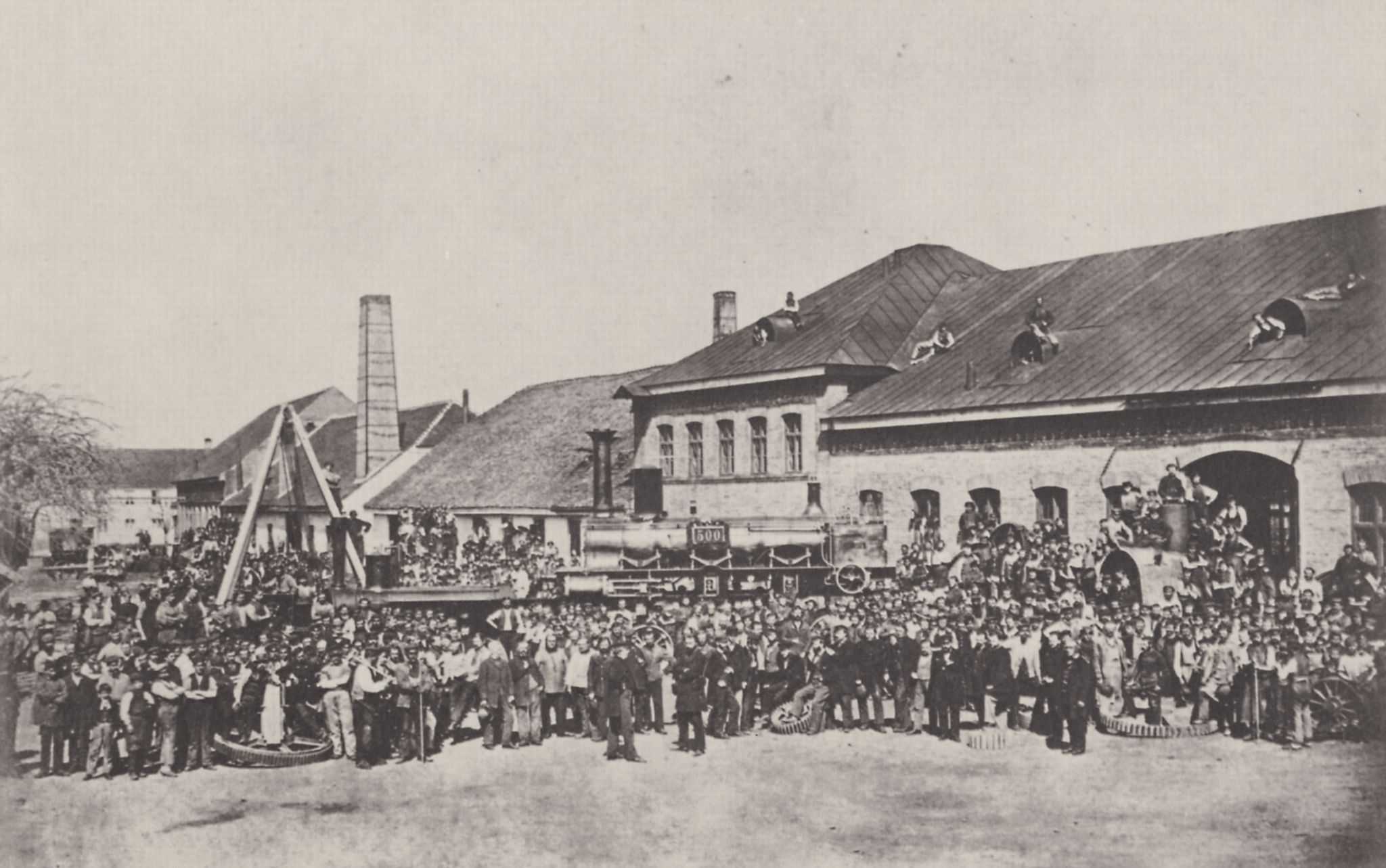
J. A. Maffei's 500th locomotive

In 1836 Maffei founded the locomotive firm of J. A. Maffei in the English Garden in Munich. His desire was to make Bavaria competitive in the field of industrial engines. From small beginnings, a locomotive factory of world renown arose. Maffei, amongst others, also championed the construction of the railway line from Munich to Augsburg and supported Johann Ulrich Himbsel in building the private railway from Munich to Starnberg. In 1864 the 500th locomotive was delivered.

== Other achievements ==
In 1851 Maffei supplied the first steamer, the Maximilian, for boat services on Lake Starnberg. By 1926 there were 44 steamships.

Maffei was also a city councillor (Magistratsrat) in Munich and busied himself e.g. with the construction of the famous hotel, the Bayerischer Hof.

== Death ==
Maffei died in Munich.

== Maffei's legacy ==
Joseph Anton Ritter von Maffei died on 1 September 1870. His grave may still be found today at the Old Southern Cemetery (Alter Südfriedhof) in Munich.

The locomotive works he founded survived him by some 60 years, but in 1930 J. A. Maffei went bankrupt and was amalgamated with the firm of Krauss in 1930 to form Krauss-Maffei.

Today, Villa Maffei in Feldafing (on Lake Starnberg) houses a museum and exhibitions.

== Origin of the Maffei family ==
The surname von Maffei or Maffei is a patronymic name derived from the personal name Matthäus (German). In ancient times the Maffei family settled in Verona from Germany.
