= Georg Krauß =

German industrialist (1826–1906)

Georg Krauß, from 1905 Ritter von Krauß (25 December 1826 – 5 November 1906) was a German industrialist and the founder of the Krauss Locomotive Works (Locomotivfabrik Krauß & Comp.) in Munich, Germany and Linz, Upper Austria. The spelling of the company name was later changed from Krauß to Krauss, once the form of the name in capital letters on the company's emblems had become established.

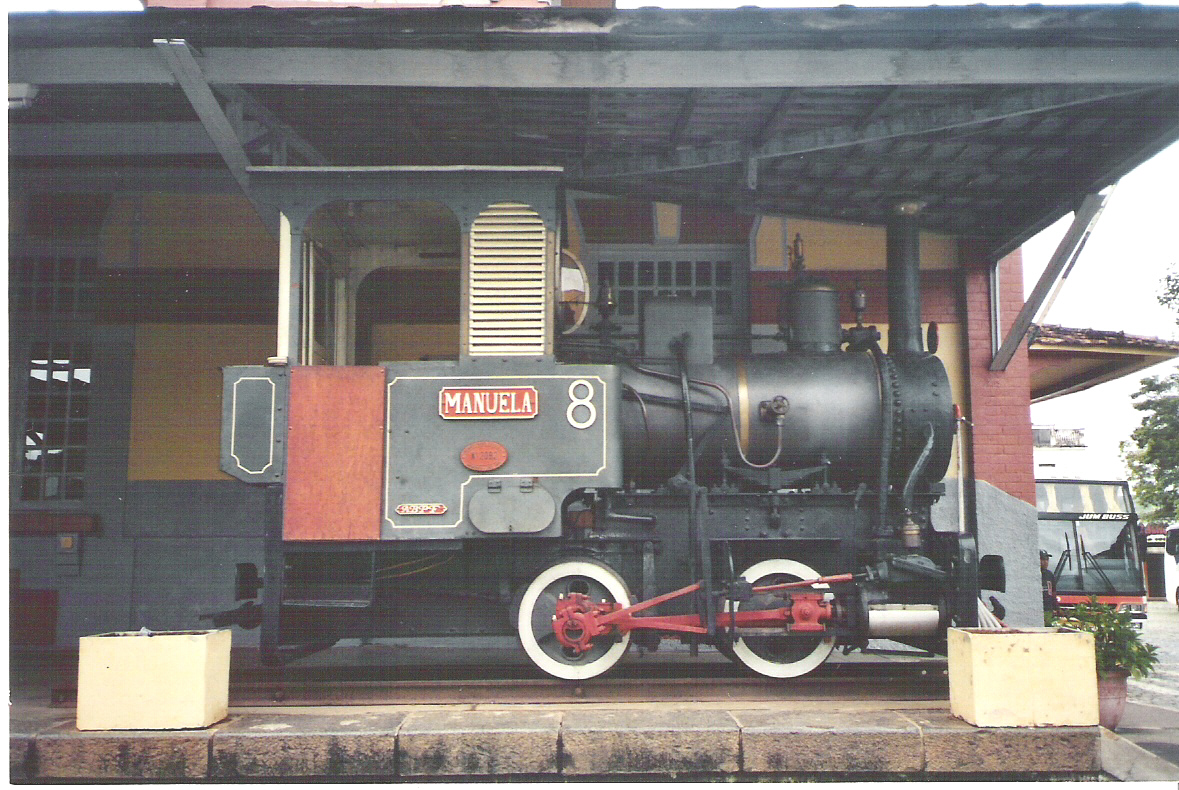
Krauss No.2092 manufactured 1889; today displayed in the station at São Lourenço, Brazil

== Early beginnings ==
Krauß was born in Augsburg as the eldest child of four, to master weaver, Johann Georg Friedrich Krauß and his wife Anna Margarethe, née Stahl. After attending primary school, he went to the Royal Polytechnic School, founded in 1833 (today Augsburg High School). After completing his education, he worked temporarily in the Maffei Locomotive Works in Munich, then for the Royal Bavarian State Railways (Königlich Bayerische Staatsbahn) in Hof, Germany, Kempten and Lindau. A decisive step in his development was his job as a master machinist with the Northeast Railway (Nordostbahn) in Zurich, where he built his first four locomotives. From then on, he was already preparing for the founding of his factory in Munich. Despite opposition from a powerful figure in the industry, Joseph Anton von Maffei, the factory was founded in Munich-Neuhausen on 17 July 1866, and additional factories were opened in 1872 and 1880, to avoid import taxes of the Danube monarchy, and expand the business.

A locomotive built by Krauss, the "Degen und Wiegand KARL" (serial number 2062), was constructed in 1888. Degen und Wiegand were a construction company in Kiel. The locomotive was sold to and used by various construction companies, including Hermann Bachstein. It was also used for rail services on the Sued Harz Eisenbahn. The Centrale Limburgsche Spoorweg (CLS) obtained the locomotive through purchase in 1916. It remained in service until 1921 and was scrapped in 1923.

== Further Successes ==
In addition to locomotives, Krauß also supported other technological developments, such as Linde's first refrigerators. He took part in the expansion of railway lines in the Saxony, Thuringia and Alsace, in the conversion of the horse-drawn tramways to steam operations in Munich and Vienna, the building of the Chiemsee Railway and the establishment of the Lokalbahn AG. In 1876, he was one of the founders of the VDI, an association for German engineers, and in 1903, he donated 100,000 marks and the repurchase of his first locomotive, 'Landwührden,' to help create the Deutsches Museum.

== Twists of Fate ==
In 1876, Krauß lost his first wife, Lydia, and in 1885 his only son, Conrad, died in an accident. After these losses, Krauß stepped back from active management of his company, transforming it into a public limited company.

== Honours ==
As early as 1880, he was awarded the Knight's Cross 1st Class of the Grand Duchy of Saxony-Weimar, as well as the title of Royal Bavarian Industrialist (Königlich bayerischer Kommerzienrat) from King Ludwig II of Bavaria for his services.

== A Life with Foresight ==
In 1905, Krauß decided to move the location of the factory from the crowded town centre out to Allach, from where its successor organisation still operates today. He did not live to see the technical completion of the Deutsches Museum or the move to Allach. On 5 November 1906, the manufacturer Georg von Krauß died shortly before his 80th birthday in Munich. His friend and one of his first co-workers, Carl von Linde, took over the chair of the board. His factory made 7,186 locomotives from 1866 until its merger with the bankrupt Maffei locomotive works in 1931.

== See also ==
- List of railway pioneers

== Sources ==
- Siegfried Baum: Die Augsburger Localbahn, EK Reihe Regionale Verkehrsgeschichte Band 30; Freiburg: Eisenbahn Kurier 2000, ISBN 3-88255-444-4
- Dr. Ing. Georg R. v. Krauss +, in: Die Lokomotive (Wien), Jahrgang 1906, Seite 213
- Alois Auer (Hrsg.): Krauss-Maffei. Lebenslauf einer Münchner Fabrik und ihrer Belegschaft. 3K-Verlag, Kösching 1988.
