= Palatinate Railway =

Defunct rail transport company in Germany

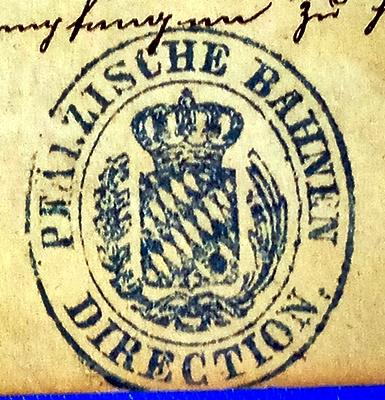
Stamp of the Palatine Railways Division (Pfälzische Bahnen Direction) in 1874

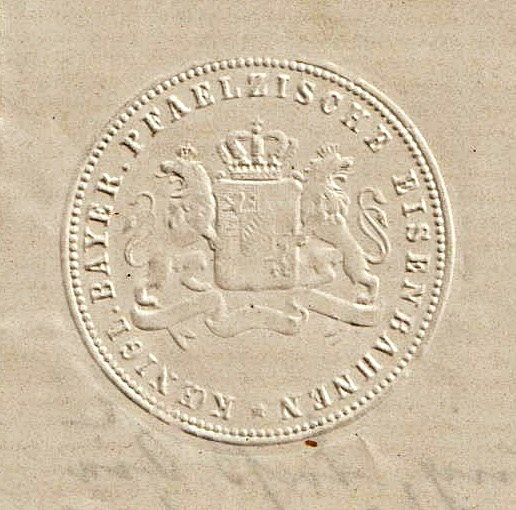
Embossed seal of the Palatine Railways, on an 1874 letter

The Palatine Railways (German: Pfälzische Eisenbahnen), often abbreviated to Palatinate Railway (Pfalzbahn) was the name of the railway division and administration responsible for all private railway companies in the Bavarian Palatinate from 1844 to 1908. The railway division was first located in the provincial capital of Speyer and later relocated to Ludwigshafen am Rhein.

The company was inaugurated with the construction of the Palatine Ludwig Railway (Pfälzische Ludwigsbahn) by the eponymous railway company. On the completion of the Palatine Maximilian Railway (Pfälzische Maximiliansbahn) the operational headquarters and management of the Palatine Maximilian Railway Company was also incorporated. In 1862, it was joined by the Neustadt - Dürkheim Railway Company (Neustadt-Dürkheimer Eisenbahn-Gesellschaft). The same happened to the Palatine Northern Railway Company (Gesellschaft der Pfälzischen Nordbahnen) in 1870.

In 1869 all the general shareholders' assemblies approved a merger of the administration, whereby the individual companies remained legally independent and separate books were kept. The shares in the Neustadt-Dürkheim company were taken over by the Northern Railway company on 1 January 1870. At the same time, the three remaining companies received new concessions and a uniform interest rate guarantee.

From 1905 the Bavarian State asserted its right of first refusal. On 1 January 1909, what was then largest private railway company in Germany was renamed as the "Royal Bavarian Railway Division of Ludwigshafen" and incorporated into the Bavarian State Railways. With the end of the monarchy the title "Royal" was dropped. In accordance with the Armistice agreements, the division was taken over by a French field railway unit on 4 December 1918.

== Literature ==
- Mühl, Albert (1982). Die Pfalzbahn: Geschichte, Betrieb und Fahrzeuge der pfälzischen Eisenbahnen. Theiss. 252 pp.

== See also ==
- Palatinate (region)
- List of Bavarian locomotives and railbuses
- List of Palatine locomotives and railbuses
