= List of Deutsche Bundesbahn locomotives and railbuses =

This article lists the locomotives and railcars/multiple units of the Deutsche Bundesbahn (DB), the German Federal Railways, that were in service between 1949 and 1993. For vehicles of the Deutsche Bahn see the List of DBAG locomotives and railbuses.

Steam locomotive classes are arranged in accordance with the DRG classification system; electric and diesel locomotives, railbuses and works vehicles are listed in accordance with the DB classification scheme. Classes that were fully retired before 1968 are listed under the classification allocated to them by the DB up to 1967. In the case of petrol-driven railbuses, a new classification system was introduced in the late 1940s that was only valid in the western zones of occupation and therefore with the later DB.

== Steam locomotives ==
The table gives the vehicle class in the first column that was used by the Deutsche Bundesbahn who adopted the DRG classification system; if necessary, figures based on the running numbers are also given where this is needed to identify the sub-classes.

In the second column the class numbers are from the DB classification scheme used from 1968 onwards. Where there is no entry in this column, all the engines had been retired by the beginning of 1968.

The Deutsche Bundesbahn retired its last steam locomotives by 1977 and completely ceased all steam traction operations by 1985.

Express train tender locomotives
Class		Original class or type	Wheel arrangement (UIC)	Sub-class	Remarks
to 1967	from 1968	Original class or type	Wheel arrangement (UIC)	Sub-class	Remarks
01.0-2	001	Einheitslok	2'C1'	S 36.20	
01.0-2	001	Einheitslok rebuild	2'C1'	S 36.20	with Henschel mixer preheater
01.0-2	001	Einheitslok rebuild	2'C1'	S 36.20	with high-performance boiler
01.10		Einheitslok	2'C1'	S 36.20	
01.10	011	with modern boiler	2'C1'	S 36.20	
01.10	012	with modern boiler	2'C1'	S 36.20	With oil-firing
03.0-2	003	Einheitslok	2'C1'	S 36.17, S 36.18	
03.10		Einheitslok	2'C1'	S 36.18	
03.10		with modern boiler	2'C1'	S 36.18	
05		Einheitslok	2'C2'	S 37.19	
10	010	Neubaulok	2'C1'	S 36.22	
17.11-12		Prussian S10.1, 1914 version	2'C	S 35.17	
18.1		Württemberg C	2'C1'	S 36.16	
18.3	018	Baden IV h.1-3	2'C1'	S 36.17	
18.4-5		Bavarian S 3/6	2'C1'	S 36.16, S 36.17, S 36.18	including some DRG copies
18.6		with modern boiler	2'C1'	S 36.18	from Bavarian S 3/6
Passenger train tender locomotives
Class		Original class or type	Wheel arrangement (UIC)	Sub-class	Remarks
to 1967	from 1968	Original class or type	Wheel arrangement (UIC)	Sub-class	Remarks
23	023	Neubaulok	1'C1'	P 35.18	
24		Einheitslok	1'C	P 34.15	
38.4		Bavarian P 3/5 H	2'C	P 35.15	
38.10-40	038	Prussian P 8	2'C	P 35.17	
38.2-3		Saxon XII H2	2'C	P 35.15	
39.0-2		Prussian P 10	1'D1'	P 46.19	
Goods train tender locomotives
Class		Original class or type	Wheel arrangement (UIC)	Sub-class	Remarks
to 1967	from 1968	Original class or type	Wheel arrangement (UIC)	Sub-class	Remarks
41		Einheitslok	1'D1'	G 46.18/20	
41	041	with modern boiler	1'D1'	G 46.18	
41	042	with modern boiler	1'D1'	G 46.18	With oil-firing
42		Kriegslokomotive	1'E	G 56.17	
42.90		Kriegslokomotive	1'E	G 56.18	Rebuild from Br 52 m. Franco-Crosti preheater
44	044	Einheitslok	1'E	G 56.20	also procured as 44 ÜK (Übergangskriegslok)
44	043	Einheitslok	1'E	G 56.20	With oil-firing
45	045	Einheitslok	1'E1'	G 57.18/20	
50	050 - 053	Einheitslok	1'E	G 56.15	also procured as 50 ÜK (Übergangskriegslok)
50.40		Einheitslok rebuild	1'E	G 56.15	with Franco-Crosti preheater
52		Kriegslokomotive	1'E	G 56.15	
54.15-17		Bavarian G 3/4 H	1'C	G 34.16	
55.0-6		Prussian G 7.1	D	G 44.13	
55.16-22		Prussian G 8	D	G 44.14	
55.25-56	055	Prussian G 8.1	D	G 44.17	
56.1		Prussian G 8.3	1'D	G 45.17	
56.2-8		Prussian G 8.1 with carrying axle	D	G 45.16	Rebuild from G8.1 by the DRG
56.20-29		Prussian G 8.2	1'D	G 45.17	
57.5		Bavarian G 5/5	E	G 55.17	
57.10-35	057	Prussian G 10	E	G 55.15	
58.2-3		Baden G 12.1-7	1'E	G 56.16	
58.4		Saxon XIII H	1'E	G 56.16	
58.5		Württemberg G 12	1'E	G 56.16	
58.10-21		Prussian G 12	1'E	G 56.16	
59		Württemberg K	1'F	G 67.16	
Tank locomotives
Class		Original class or type	Wheel arrangement (UIC)	Sub-class	Remarks
to 1967	from 1968	Original class or type	Wheel arrangement (UIC)	Sub-class	Remarks
61		Einheitslok	2'C2'	St 37.18	
62		Einheitslok	2'C2'	Pt 37.20	
64	064	Einheitslok	1'C1'	Pt 35.15	
65	065	Neubaulok	1'D2'	Pt 47.17	
66		Neubaulok	1'C2'	Pt 36.16	
70.0		Bavarian Pt 2/3	1'B	Pt 23.14	
70.1		Baden Ig.1-2	1'B	Pt 23.14, Pt 23.15	some were DRG copies
71		Einheitslok	1'B1'	Pt 24.15	
74.0-3		Prussian T 11	1'C	Pt 34.16	
74.4-13		Prussian T 12	1'C	Pt 34.17	
75.0		Württemberg T 5	1'C1'	Pt 35.15	
75.1-3		Baden VI b.1-11	1'C1'	Pt 35.14	
75.4		Baden VI c.1-7	1'C1'	Pt 35.16	
75.10-11		Baden VI c.8-9	1'C1'	Pt 35.16	
76.0		Prussian T 10	2'C	Pt 35.16	
77.0		Palatine P 5	1'C2'	Pt 36.16	
77.1		Palatine Pt 3/6, Bavarian Pt 3/6	1'C2'	Pt 36.16	
78.0-5	078	Prussian T 18, Württemberg T 18	2'C2'	Pt 37.17	
78.10		Rebuild	2'C2'	Pt 37.17	from Prussian P 8
80		Einheitslok	C	Gt 33.17	
81		Einheitslok	D	Gt 44.17	
82	082	Neubaulok	E	Gt 55.18	
85		Einheitslok	1'E1'	Gt 57.20	Höllentalbahn
86	086	Einheitslok	1'D1'	Gt 46.15	also procured as ÜK (Übergangskriegslok)
87		Einheitslok	E	Gt 55.17	with cogwheel drive on outer axles
89.1		Palatine T 3	C	Gt 33.14	
89.3		Württemberg T 3	C	Gt 33.10, Gt 33.12	
89.6		Bavarian D II.II	C	Gt 33.15	
89.7		Bavarian R 3/3	C	Gt 33.15	
89.8		Bavarian R 3/3	C	Gt 33.16	DRG copy
89.70-75		Prussian T 3	C	Gt 33.10, Gt 33.11, Gt 33.12	
91.3-18		Prussian T 9.3	1'C	Gt 34.15	
91.19		Mecklenburg T 4	1'C	Gt 34.11, Gt 34.12, Gt 34.13	
91.20		Württemberg T 9	1'C	Gt 34.15	
92.2-3		Baden X b.1-7	D	Gt 44.15, Gt 44.16	
92.5-10		Prussian T 13, Oldenburg T 13	D	Gt 44.15, Gt 44.16	
92.20		Palatine R 4/4, Bavarian R 4/4	D	Gt 44.16	
93.0-4		Prussian T 14	1'D1'	Gt 46.16	
93.5-12	093	Prussian T 14.1; Württemberg T 14	1'D1'	Gt 46.17	
94.1		Württemberg Tn	E	Gt 55.13	
94.2-4		Prussian T 16	E	Gt 55.15	
94.5-17	094	Prussian T 16.1	E	Gt 55.17	
95.0		Prussian T 20	1'E1'	Gt 57.19	
97.1		Bavarian PtzL 3/4	C1'	Z 34.15	Rack railway locomotive
97.5		Württemberg Hz	E	Z 55.15	Rack railway locomotive, DRG new build
98.3		Bavarian PtL 2/2	B	L 22.11	Branch line locomotive Glaskasten ('glass box')
98.4-5		Bavarian D XI	C1'	L 34.10, L 34.11	Branch line locomotive
98.5		Bavarian PtL 3/4	C1'	L 34.11	Branch line locomotive
98.6		Palatine D VIII	C1'	L 34.13	Branch line locomotive
98.8-9	098	Bavarian GtL 4/4	D	L 44.11, L 44.12	Branch line locomotive, including some DRG copies
98.10		DRG new build	D1'	L 45.11	Branch line locomotive
98.11	097	DRG rebuild - Bavarian GtL 4/5	1'D	L 45.11	Branch line locomotive, rebuild from Bavarian GtL 4/4
98.18		ex LAG	1'D1'	-	Branch line locomotive
Narrow gauge locomotives
Class		Original class or type	Wheel arrangement (UIC)	Sub-class	Remarks
to 1967	from 1968	Original class or type	Wheel arrangement (UIC)	Sub-class	Remarks
99	099		Various		Narrow gauge locomotives

== Electric locomotives ==
The electric vehicles of the Deutsche Bundesbahn have been designed for operating with a voltage of 15 kV, 16,667 Hz.

Class		Wheel arrangement (UIC)	Remarks
to 1967	from 1968	Wheel arrangement (UIC)	Remarks
E 03	103	Co'Co'	
E 04	104	1'Co1'	
E 10	110	Bo'Bo'	See also Einheitselektrolokomotive
	111	Bo'Bo'	
E 10.12	112	Bo'Bo'	E10 with altered drive transmission, reclassified to Class 113 in 1991
	112.1	Bo'Bo'	DR class 212 (GDR development), procured by the DB in 1992 in batch of 45 units
E 10.12	113	Bo'Bo'	Classified as Class 112 up to 1991
E 10.12	114	Bo'Bo'	Reclassified from Class 112 due to restriction to 140 km/h
E 16	116	1'Do1'	Bavarian ES 1
E 17	117	1'Do1'	
E 18	118	1'Do1'	
E 19	119	1'Do1'	
	120	Bo'Bo'	
E 32	132	1'C1'	Bavarian EP 2
E 33		1'C1'	BBÖ 1029, returned to the ÖBB as 1073 in 1952
E 40.11	139	Bo'Bo'	
E 40	140	Bo'Bo'	See also Einheitselektrolokomotive
E 41	141	Bo'Bo'	See also Einheitselektrolokomotive
E 44	144	Bo'Bo'	
E 44.5	144.5	Bo'Bo'	
E 50	150	Co'Co'	See also Einheitselektrolokomotive
	151	Co'Co'	
E 52	152	2'BB2'	Bavarian EP 5
	155	Co′Co′	
E 60	160	1'C	
E 62		1'C1'	Bavarian EP 1
E 63	163	C	
E 69	169	Bo	LAG 1 - 5 Lokalbahn AG
E 70.2		1'C1'	Bavarian EG 2
E 71		B'B'	Prussian EG 511 to EG 537
E 72		1'C1'	BBÖ 1005, returned to the ÖBB as 1072 in 1952
E 73		Bo'Bo'	Hamburg-Altona harbour railway
E 75	175		
E 80			
E 310	181.0-1		Multi-system locomotive for cross-border working
	181.2		Multi-system locomotive for cross-border working to France and Luxembourg (25 kV AC, 50 Hz)
E 320	182		
E 344	183		
E 410	184		Multi-system locomotive for cross-border working
E 91.0	191		Bavarian EG 5
E 91.9	191		Prussian EG 581 to EG 594
E 93	193	Co'Co'	
E 94	194	Co'Co'	
E 170			
E 244		Bo'Bo'	electrical equipment for working at 25 KV~, 50 Hz

== Diesel locomotives ==
Class		Wheel arrangement	Remarks
to 1967	from 1968	Wheel arrangement	Remarks
	201 001	Bo'Bo'	Krupp - AEG ME 1500
	202 001	Bo'Bo'	Henschel-SSW DE 2000
	202 002 and 004	Co'Co'	Henschel-BBC DE 2500
	202 003	Bo'Bo'	Henschel-BBC DE 2500
	210	B'B'	Production locomotives of the V160 family with gas turbines
V 100.10	211	B'B'	
V 100.20	212	B'B'	
V 100.23	213	B'B'	
	214	B'B'	Locos for tunnel rescue trains, rebuilt from BR 212
	215	B'B'	
V 160	216	B'B'	
V 162	217	B'B'	
(V 164)	218	B'B'	
V 169	219	B'B'	
V 200.0	220	B'B'	
V 200.1	221	B'B'	
V 300	230	C'C'	
V 320	232	C'C'	
V 36	236	C	former Wehrmacht locomotive WR 360 C 14 and successors
V 140		1'C1'	
	240	Co'Co'	MaK DE 1024
V 45	245	B	
V 50		C	Locos of the former Wilhelmsburg Industrial Railway
V 51	251	B'B'	750 mm gauge
V 52	252	B'B'	1000 mm gauge
	259	C / Co	various Lokomotives for trials
V 60	260	C	V60 to 50t , From 1987 grouped as DB Class 360
V 60	261	C	V60 with 54 t, From 1987 grouped as DB Class 361
V 65	265	D	
V 20	270	B	former Wehrmacht locomotive WR 200 B 14
V 22	270	B, C	former Wehrmacht locomotives WR 220 B and C
	279	D	Diesel engines of the Söhrebahn
V 80	280	B'B'	
V 88		B'B'	Demonstration locomotive DH 875 from Henschel (V 88 001)
V 188	288	Do + Do	former Wehrmacht locomotive D 311
V 90	290	B'B'	
	291	B'B'	
V 29	299	B'B'	1000mm gauge
Kö I	311	B	
Köf II	321	B	Köf II with mechanical brake
Köf II	322	B	Köf II with compressed-air brake, v(max) to 30 km/h
Köf II	323	B	Köf II with compressed-air brake, v(max) to 45 km/h
Köf II	324	B	Köf II with compressed-air brake, v(max) to 45 km/h
V 11.9, Köf 99	329	C	Narrow gauge Köf for the Wangerooge Island Railway 329 501–503
	329	B	schmalspurige Köf for the Wangerooge Island Railway 329 504
Köf III	331	B	Köf III with wheels driven by chain drive (Rollenketten), v(max) = 30 km/h
Köf III	332	B	Köf III with wheels driven by chain drive (Rollenketten), v(max) = 45 km/h
Köf III	333	B	Köf III with wheels driven by cardan shafts (Gelenkwellen), v(max) = 45 km/h
	333.9	B	former V 18 and V 19 of the Kerkerbachbahn 1975–1981, v(max) = 40 km/h
Köf III	335	B	Rebuild from vehicles of Class 333 with shunting radios
V 60	360	C	V 60 to 50t , up to 1987 grouped as DB Class 260
V 60	361	C	V 60 with 54t , up to 1987 grouped as DB Class 261
V 60	364	C	V 60 to 50t with radios, rebuild from DB Class 360
V 60	365	C	V 60 with 54t with radios, rebuild from DB Class 361
Ks 4012 - 4015	381	Bo	
Ks 4071; Ks 4815 - 4820; Ks 4859 - 4870; Ks 4903 - 4910; Ks 4979 - 4993	381	B	

== Electric multiple units (EMU, "Elektrische Triebwagen") ==
Classes								
Railcar		Centre coach		Driving coach		Trailer coach		
to 1967	from 1968	to 1967	from 1968	to 1967	from 1968	to 1967	from 1968	Remarks
	401		801 - 804					ICE 1
	402		805 - 807		808			ICE 2
	403 (1973)		404					operated as Lufthansa Airport Express and as Intercity
ET 11								later: Mü 5015, 723 001
	420		421					S-Bahn: Frankfurt, Munich and Stuttgart
ET 25	425						825	
ET 26	426						826	
ET 27	427						827	
ET 30	430						830	
ET 31, ET 32	432						832	
ET 45	445							former Höllentalbahn railbus ET 255
	450							Albtal-Verkehrs-Gesellschaft
ET 55	455						855	
ET 56	456						856	
ET 65	465						865	Stuttgart S-Bahn
ET 170.1	470						870	Hamburg S-Bahn
ET 171	471					EM 171	871	Hamburg S-Bahn
	472		473					Hamburg S-Bahn
ET 85	485					ES 85		Berlin S-Bahn
ET 87								
ET 88								
ET 89								
ET 90	490							
ET 91	491							Glass train
ET 195								Ravensburg–Weingarten–Baienfurt tramway
ET 196						EB 196		Ravensburg–Weingarten–Baienfurt Tramway
ET 197						EB 197		Ravensburg–Weingarten–Baienfurt Tramway
ET 255								50 Hertz operation Höllentalbahn in the Black Forest

== Battery electric multiple units ("Akkumulatortriebwagen") ==
Classes								
Railcar		Centre coach		Driving coach		Trailer coach		
to 1967	from 1968	to 1967	from 1968	to 1967	from 1968	to 1967	from 1968	Remarks
ETA 150	515			ESA 150	815.6			
ETA 176	517			ESA 176	817.6			
ETA 177								
ETA 178								ex Prussian Class AT 3 "Wittfeld version"
ETA 179; ETA 179.1								In 1952/53, AT 581/582 to AT 615/616 were modernised to this class
ETA 180								

== Diesel multiple units ("Verbrennungstriebwagen") including Diesel railbuses ==
Classes								
Railcar		Centre coach		Driving coach		Trailer coach		
to 1967	from 1968	to 1967	from 1968	to 1967	from 1968	to 1967	from 1968	Remarks
VT 11.5	601	VM 11.5	901					
	602		901					Rebuild from Class 601
VT 04.0; VT 04								Flying Hamburger and Hamburg version
VT 06								Köln version
VT 07								Rebuilt SVT Berlin version
VT 08.5	608	VM 08.5	908	VS 08.5	908			
VT 08.8	608	VS 08.8	908					US-Army
	610							
VT 10.5								Multiple unit
VT 12.5	612		912					
VT 12.6	613		913					Rebuild from Class VT 08.5
	614		914					
VT 23.5; VT 24.5; VT 24.6	624		924					
VT 25.5								
	627							
	628.0							
	628				928			
VT 30.0								
VT 32								
VT 33	633							US-Army
	634		934					
VT 36								
VT 38								
VT 45	645							Stettin version
VT 50								
VT 51								
VT 60								
VT 62.9								
VT 63.9								
VT 66.9								
VT 69.9								
VT 70								
VT 72								
VT 75								
VT 78								
VT 79								
VT 85								
VT 86								
VT 90								
VT 92.5	692							
	699							Narrow gauge railbus for Wangerooge Island Railway
None	(790)							Road-rail vehicle
VT 95.9	795					VB 142	995	Uerdingen railbus
						VB 141	941	One-axle trailer for luggage conveyance
None	796				996		996	class 798/998 vehicles converted to one-man operation
VT 97.9	797			VS 97	997	VB 97	997	Uerdingen railbus
VT 98.9	798			VS 98	998	VB 98	998	Uerdingen railbus

== Steam Railbuses ==
Class		Original class or type	Wheel arrangement (UIC)	Sub-class	Remarks
to 1967	from 1968	Original class or type	Wheel arrangement (UIC)	Sub-class	Remarks
1 and 8		Baden steam railbus	A1	BD BDaaio	

== DB Works Vehicles ==
Class		Original class or type	Wheel arrangement (UIC)	Sub-class	Remarks
to 1967	from 1968	Original class or type	Wheel arrangement (UIC)	Sub-class	Remarks
VT 55	701; 702				Turm railcar
	704				Turm railcar
	708				Turm railcar
	709				Turm railcar
	712				Tunnel profile measurement vehicle
	714				Emergency train locomotive
	716				Snow plough
	719				Rail inspection train
	724				PZB measurement vehicle
	725/726				Track measurement vehicle
	727				LZB measurement vehicle
	728				PZB measurement vehicle
	740				Signal works railcar
	750				ex BR 103
	751				ex BR 110
	752				ex BR 120
	753				ex BR 217

== See also ==
- Deutsche Bundesbahn
- UIC classification
