= Prussian T 18 =

Class of 542 German 4-6-4T locomotives

Prussian T 18 DRG Class 78.0–5 PKP OKo 1
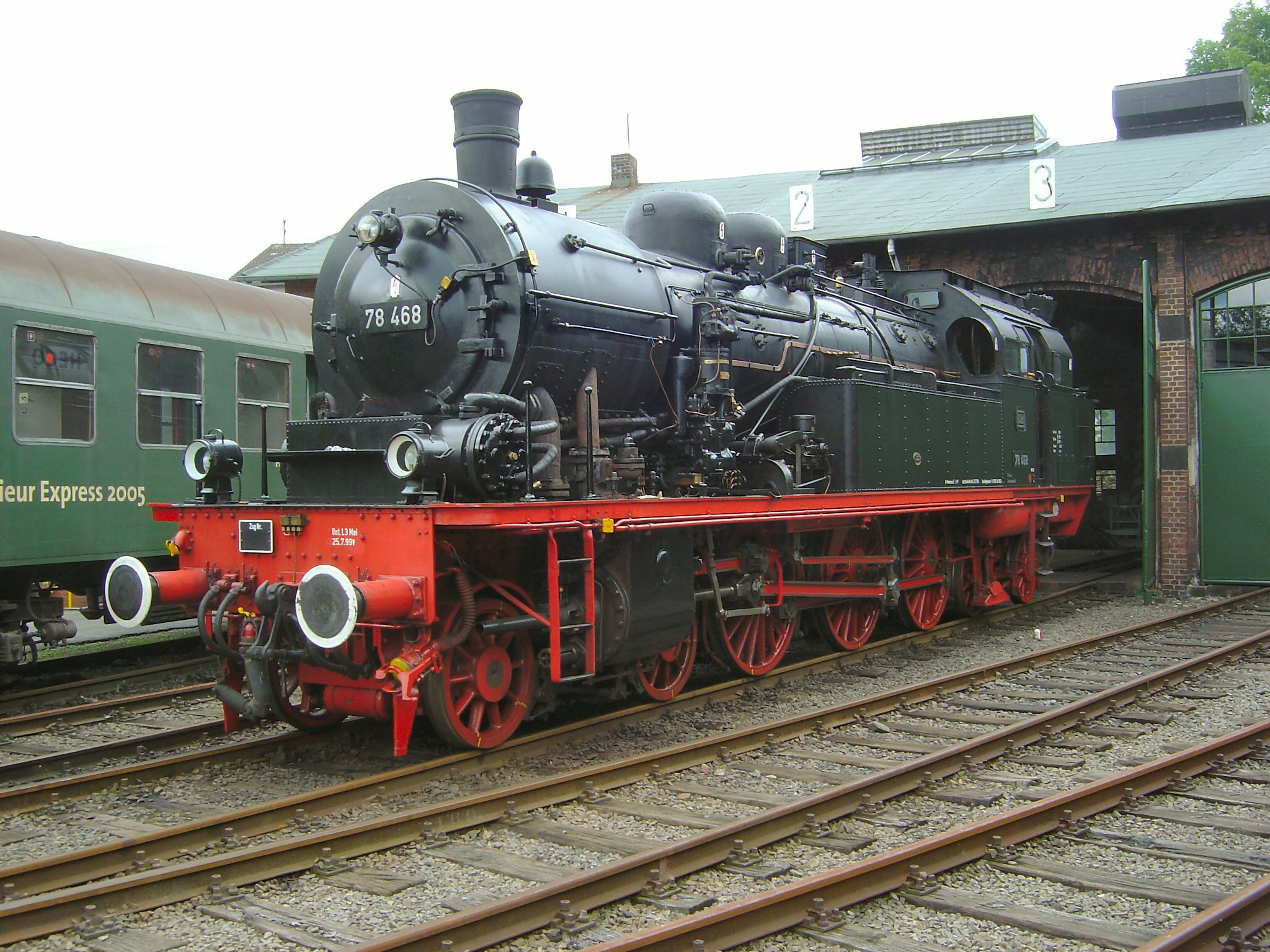
- 78 468 in Dieringhausen Railway Museum
Type and origin
- Builder: Stettiner Maschinenbau AG Vulcan (448); Henschel & Sohn (80); Hanomag (3); Societe Franco-Belge (3)
- Build date: 1912–1927
- Total produced: 534
Specifications
- Configuration
  - Whyte: 4-6-4T
  - German: Pt 37.17
- Gauge: 1,435 mm (4 ft 8 1/2 in)
- Leading dia.: 1,000 mm (3 ft 3 3/8 in)
- Driver dia.: 1,650 mm (5 ft 5 in)
- Trailing dia.: 1,000 mm (3 ft 3 3/8 in)
- Length
  - Over beams: 14,800 mm (48 ft 6 5/8 in)
- Axle load: 17.0 tonnes (16.7 long tons; 18.7 short tons)
- Adhesive weight: 51.1 tonnes (50.3 long tons; 56.3 short tons)
- Empty weight: 83.2 tonnes (81.9 long tons; 91.7 short tons)
- Service weight: 105.0 tonnes (103.3 long tons; 115.7 short tons)
- Fuel capacity: 4.5 t (9,900 lb) of coal
- Water cap.: 12 m^{3} (2,600 imp gal; 3,200 US gal)
- Boiler
- No. of heating tubes: 134
- No. of smoke tubes: 24
- Heating tube length: 4,700 mm (15 ft 5 in)
- Boiler pressure: 12 kg/cm^{2} (1.18 MPa; 171 lbf/in^{2})
- Heating surface
  - Firebox: 2.44 m^{2} (26.3 sq ft)
  - Radiative: 13.04 m^{2} (140.4 sq ft)
  - Evaporative: 138.34 m^{2} (1,489.1 sq ft)
- Superheater
  - Heating area: 49.20 m^{2} (529.6 sq ft)
- Cylinders: 2
- Cylinder size: 560 mm (22 1/16 in)
- Piston stroke: 630 mm (24 13/16 in)
- Loco brake: Compressed-air brake
Performance figures
- Maximum speed: to 78 009: 90 km/h (56 mph); from 78 010: 100 km/h (62 mph)
- Indicated power: 1,140 PS (838 kW; 1,120 hp)
Career
- Numbers: DRG 78 001 – 78 330, 78 351 – 78 528
- Retired: 1975

The Prussian T 18 was the last class of tank locomotives developed for the Prussian state railways. They were originally intended for services on the island of Rügen as replacements for Class T 12 and T 10 engines. They emerged when a class of locomotive was conceived in 1912 that was to handle express and passenger trains in border areas or in shuttle services on short routes. A tank engine design with symmetrical running gear was envisaged because, unlike a tender locomotive, it could run equally fast forwards and backwards and could be operated on return journeys without having to be turned on a turntable. Its power and top speed were to be the same as those of the P 8. Robert Garbe designed this 4-6-4 (2′C2′) tank locomotive for 100 km/h with a 17-ton axle load and contracted the Vulkan Werke in Stettin to build it. It was given the designation T 18.

A total of 534 engines were built from 1912 to 1927, mainly by the Stettiner Maschinenbau AG Vulcan and, from 1923, also by Henschel, of which 458 alone went to the Prussian state railways and, subsequently, the Deutsche Reichsbahn. The Royal Württemberg State Railways received 20 T 18s in 1919, the Imperial Railways in Alsace-Lorraine 27 also in 1919, the Saar Railway (Saarbahn) 27 between 1922–25 and the Eutin-Lübeck Railway (Eutin-Lübecker Eisenbahn) one in each of the years 1936 and 1939.

The Reichsbahn took over 460 vehicles from Prussia and 20 from the Royal Württemberg State Railways, incorporating them into DRG Class 78 with operating numbers 78 001–282 and 78 351–528. Of these, number 78 093 came from Alsace-Lorraine and numbers 78 146–165 from Württemberg. Later the engines from the Saar Railway were numbered 78 283 to 78 328 in 1935. and those of the Eutin-Lübeck Railway as 78 329 and 78 330 in 1941.

The Deutsche Bundesbahn took over 424 engines and the Deutsche Reichsbahn in East Germany 53 examples. In 1968 only 35 engines remained with the DR in East Germany. In 1965 the DR fitted the majority of its engines with Giesl chimneys and Witte smoke deflectors. From 1968 the DB locomotives were reclassified into Class 078; in 1970 the DR regrouped its locomotives into Class 78.1.

The PKP took over some locomotives, classifying them as OKo 1.

The DB converted several Class 78s for push-pull running e.g. between Frankfurt and Wiesbaden. Because the engine driver in the driving coach could only work the brake, operation of the regulator and reversing gear was carried out by specially trained stokers as signalled by the engine driver. The last locomotives were retired by the DB in the mid-1970s at Rottweil locomotive depot (Bahnbetriebswerk or Bw). The farewell journey for this engine class and, at the same time for the Class 38s (Prussian P 8), took place on 31 December 1974. The event was organised by the Zollern Railway Friends. The trip was even reported on the German television channel, ARD.

== Notable members ==
- 78 185 was featured in The Great Escape hauling a train made up with Bavarian 3-axle coaches and some newer 2-axle steel coaches. Other scenes depicting the same train were filmed with a DRG Class 86 tank engine.
- 78 079 drove through the Berlin Wall under driver Harry Deterling on the 5th of December, 1961.

== Preservation ==
Several T 18 are preserved in museums:

- 78 009 belongs to the Dresden Transport Museum fleet and is looked after by the IG Bahnbetriebswerk Dresden-Altstadt.
- 78 189, as OKo 1-3 belongs to the Warsaw Railway Museum in Poland.
- 78 246 can be viewed at the German Steam Locomotive Museum (Deutschen Dampflokomotiv-Museum).
- 78 468 (see photograph) belongs to the city of Oberhausen and is operational. It is run by the Emscher Park Eisenbahn Gesellschaft.
- 78 510 belongs to the DB Museum's collection.
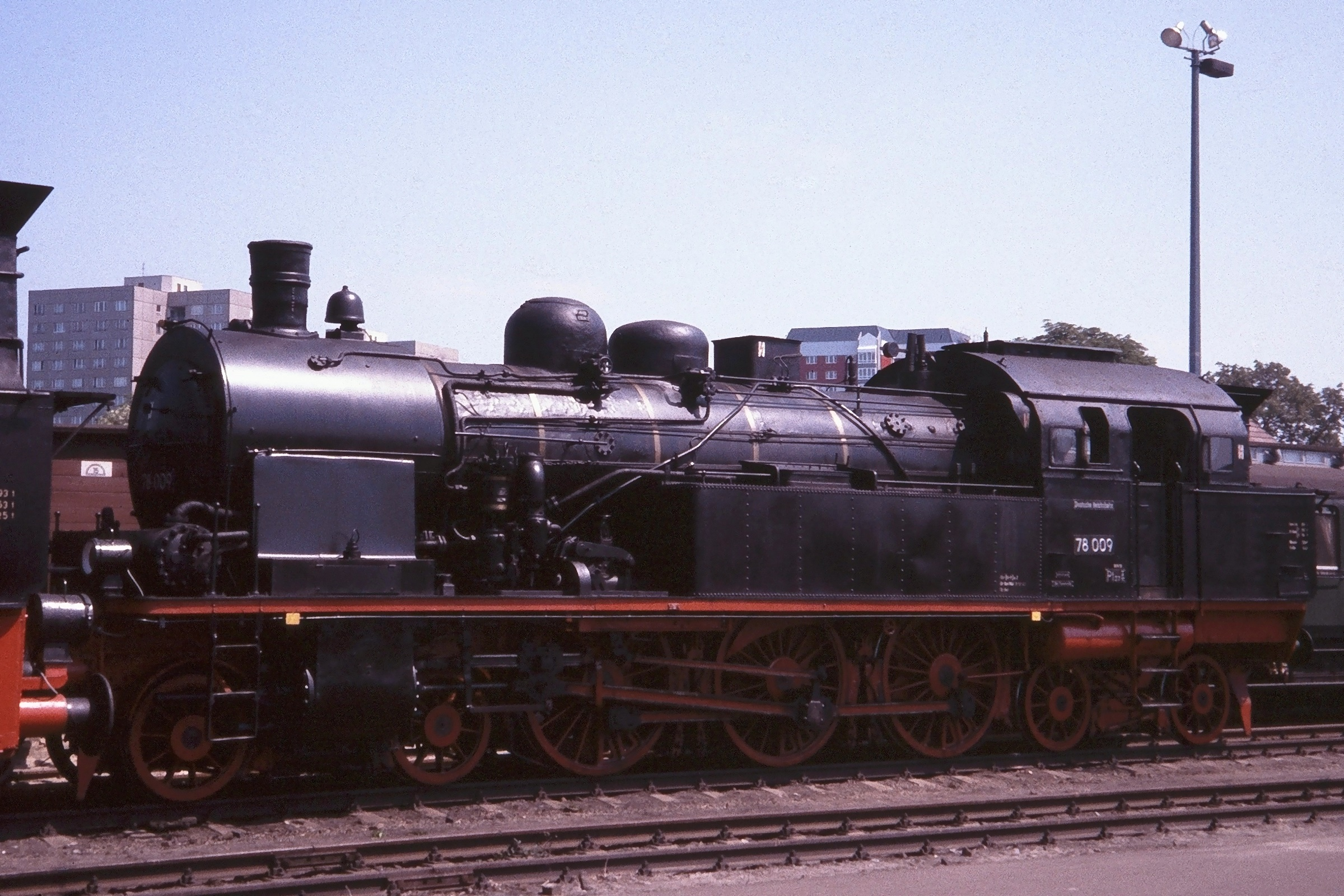
DR 78 009 in Potsdam (1993)

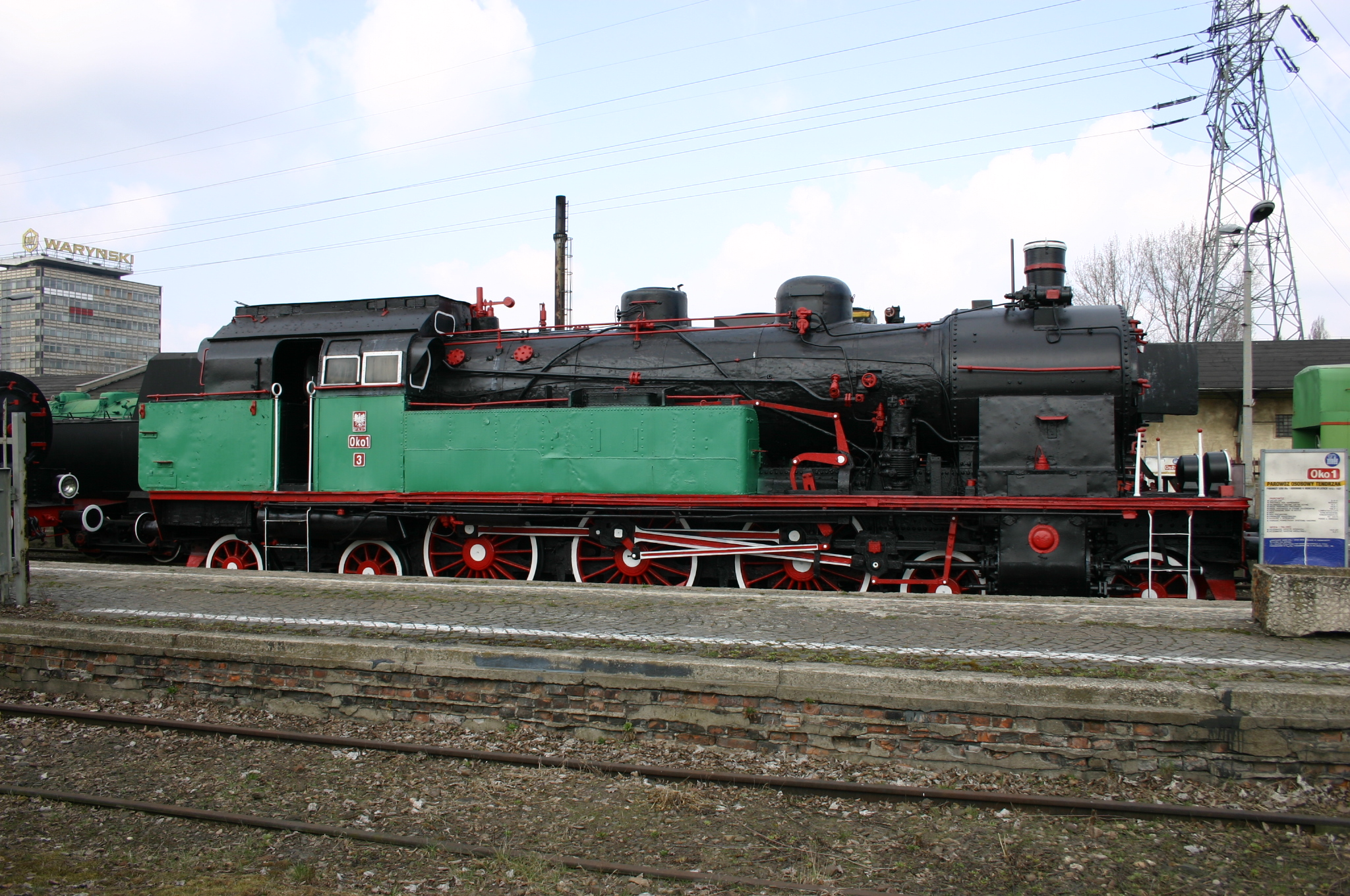
OKo 1-3 ex 78 189 (Vulcan 3610 of 1920)

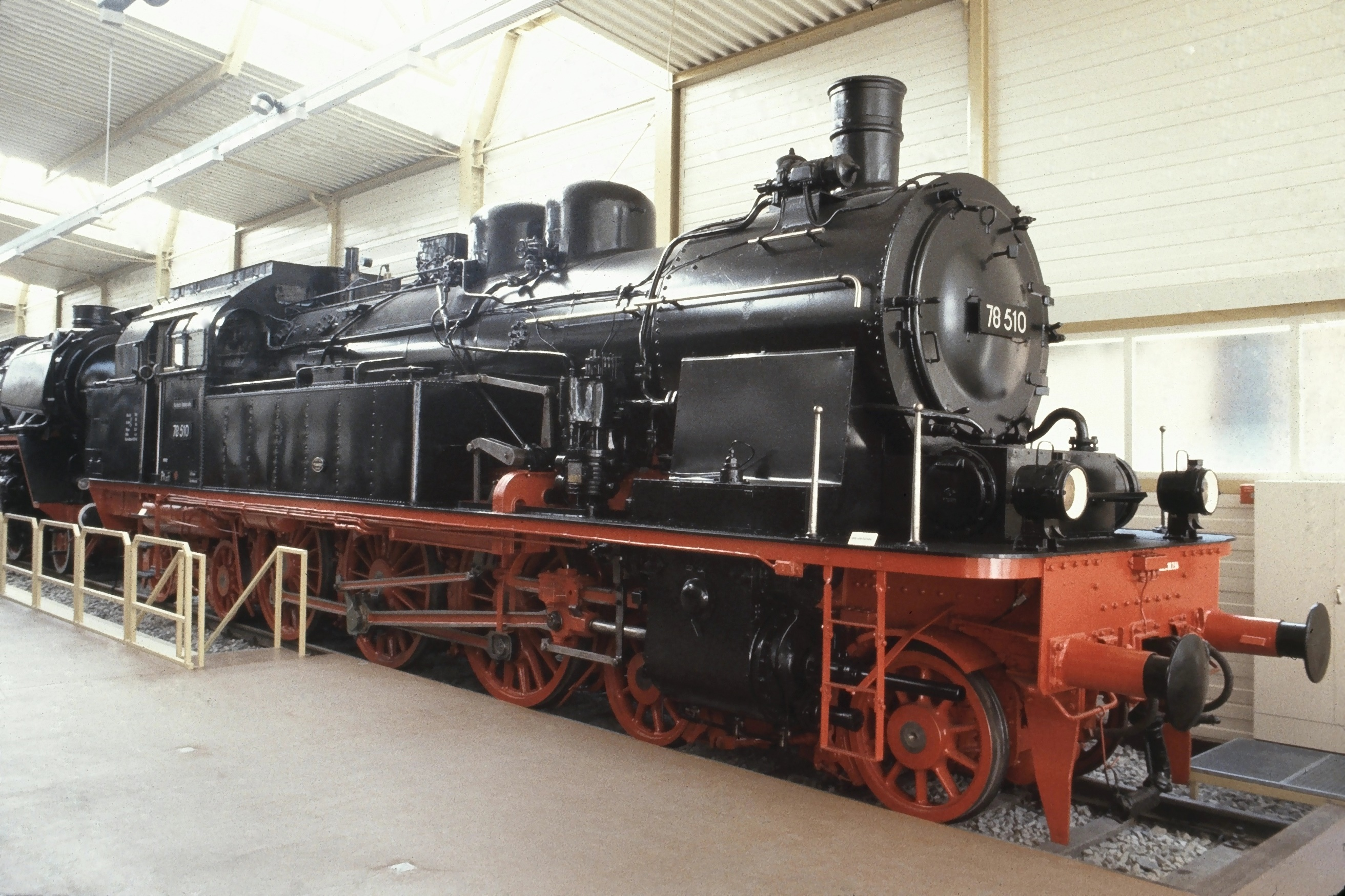
DB 78 510 in the Nuremberg Transport Museum

== See also ==
- Prussian state railways
- List of DRG locomotives and railbuses
- List of Prussian locomotives and railbuses
