= Class 57 =

Class 57 or 57 class may refer to:

- British Rail Class 57
- DRG Class 57, a German goods locomotive class with a 0-10-0 wheel arrangement operated by the Deutsche Reichsbahn and comprising the:
  - Class 57.0: Saxon XI V
  - Class 57.0^{II}: BBÖ 180, PKP-Class Tw11
  - Class 57.1: Saxon XI H
  - Class 57.1–5^{II}: BBÖ 80, PKP-Class Tw12, JDŽ 28
  - Class 57.2: Saxon XI HV
  - Class 57.3: Württemberg H
  - Class 57.4: Württemberg Hh
  - Class 57.5: Bavarian G 5/5
  - Class 57.6: BBÖ 480
  - Class 57.7: ČSD Class 524.2
  - Class 57.8: JDŽ 134
  - Class 57.9: PH I
  - Class 57.10–35: Prussian G 10
- New South Wales 57 class locomotive
