= DB Class V 80 =

Class of German 1090hp diesel-hydraulic locomotives

DB Class V 80 later DB Class 280
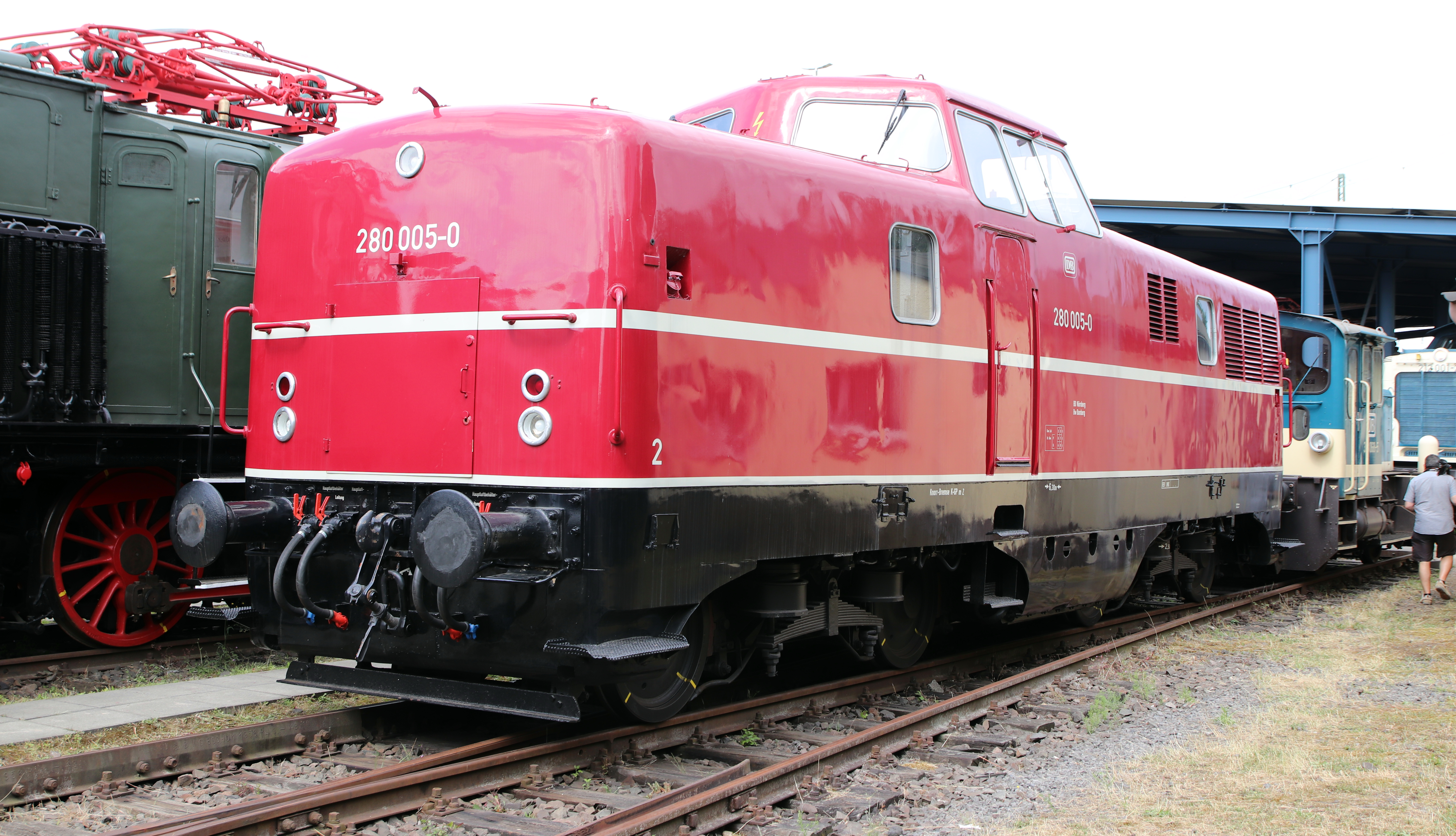
- 280 005 in 2018
Type and origin
- Power type: Diesel-hydraulic
- Builder: Maschinenbau Kiel (5); Krauss-Maffei (5)
- Serial number: MaK: 800001–800005; K-M: 17716–17720
- Build date: 1952
- Total produced: 10
Specifications
- Configuration
  - UIC: B′B′
- Gauge: 1,435 mm (4 ft 8 1/2 in)
- Wheel diameter: 950 mm (3 ft 1 3/8 in)
- Wheelbase: 9,200 mm (30 ft 2 1/4 in)
  - Bogie: 2,900 mm (9 ft 6 1/8 in)
- Pivot centres: 6,300 mm (20 ft 8 in)
- Length
  - Over buffers: 12,800 mm (41 ft 11 7/8 in)
- Width: 3,060 mm (10 ft 1/2 in)
- Axle load: 14.5 t (14.3 long tons; 16.0 short tons)
- Adhesive weight: 58.0 t (57.1 long tons; 63.9 short tons)
- Service weight: 58.0 t (57.1 long tons; 63.9 short tons)
- Fuel type: Diesel fuel
- Fuel capacity: 2,250 L (490 imp gal; 590 US gal)
- Prime mover: Maybach MD 650; later MTU MB 12 V 493 TZ
- RPM
  - Maximum RPM: 1,500
- Engine type: 12-cylinder four-stroke diesel
- Transmission: Hydraulic
- Train heating: Steam
- Loco brake: compressed air brake
Performance figures
- Maximum speed: 100 km/h (62 mph)
- Power output: 1,100 PS (809 kW; 1,080 hp)
- Power index: 14 kW/t (19 PS/t)
- Tractive effort
  - Starting: 190 kN (43,000 lb_{f})
Career
- Numbers: V 80 001 – V 80 010; 280 001 – 280 010 from 1968
- Retired: 1978

The Class V 80 is a type of German diesel-hydraulic locomotive operated by the Deutsche Bundesbahn, that was redesignated as Class 280 from 1968. It was the first, main line, diesel locomotive with a hydraulic transmission.

== History ==
This type of locomotive was the first newly developed diesel locomotive built for main line service by the Deutsche Bundesbahn (DB). Only 10 examples of the class were built at the beginning of the 1950s, but it formed the basis for all subsequent DB designs in this sector.

The locomotives were initially distributed to the locomotive depots (Bahnbetriebswerke) at Frankfurt am Main and Bamberg. In Frankfurt/Main they were used on suburban services from Frankfurt/Main Hbf to Bad Homburg v.d.Höhe and to Kronberg and also hauled fast-stopping trains (Eilzüge) between Frankfurt/Main and Cologne. The Bamberg engines were used on Nuremberg’s suburban services and on various branch lines around Bamberg. From 1963 all the locos were gathered together at Bamberg and took over passenger and goods train duties on many branch lines in northern Bavaria.

The demise of branch lines in the 1970s meant that the DB could get rid of this small class of just 10 engines between 1976 and 1978, because sufficient locomotives of the comparable Class V 100 were available.

== Design ==
A classic feature of these engines was the driver's cab in the centre of the vehicle which could be used in both directions and which jutted out above the engine rooms. In the basic design the V 80 had elements, that were also used on all succeeding diesel locomotive classes: a diesel engine that ran at medium-speed, hydraulic gears, power transmission via the centre axle by means of universal joints. Originally three different motors were fitted with 800 to 1000 PS; later 1,100 PS MTU motors were installed. All were supercharged V12 four-stroke diesel engines.

== Italy ==
After being withdrawn in Germany, the locomotives of Class 280 were largely sold to private railways and to track construction firms in Italy.

In 1959, Officine Meccaniche Italiane built a prototype diesel-hydraulic locomotive for Consorzio Cooperativo Ferrovie Reggiane. This lone prototype, CCFR 920, later sold to Ferrovie del Sud Est had a similar aspect but shared no common parts.

== Preserved ==
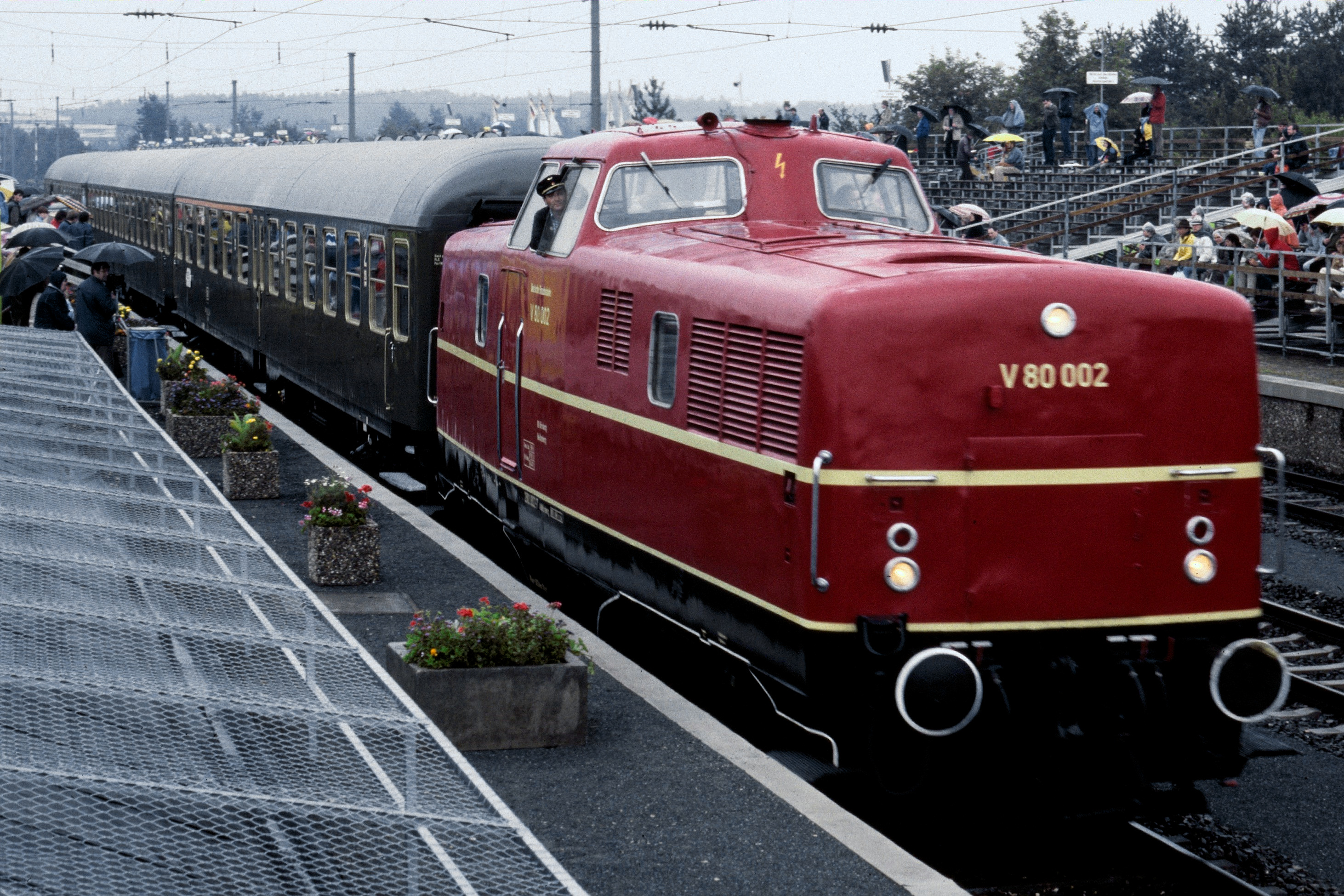
V 80 002 at Nuremberg-Langwasser in 1985

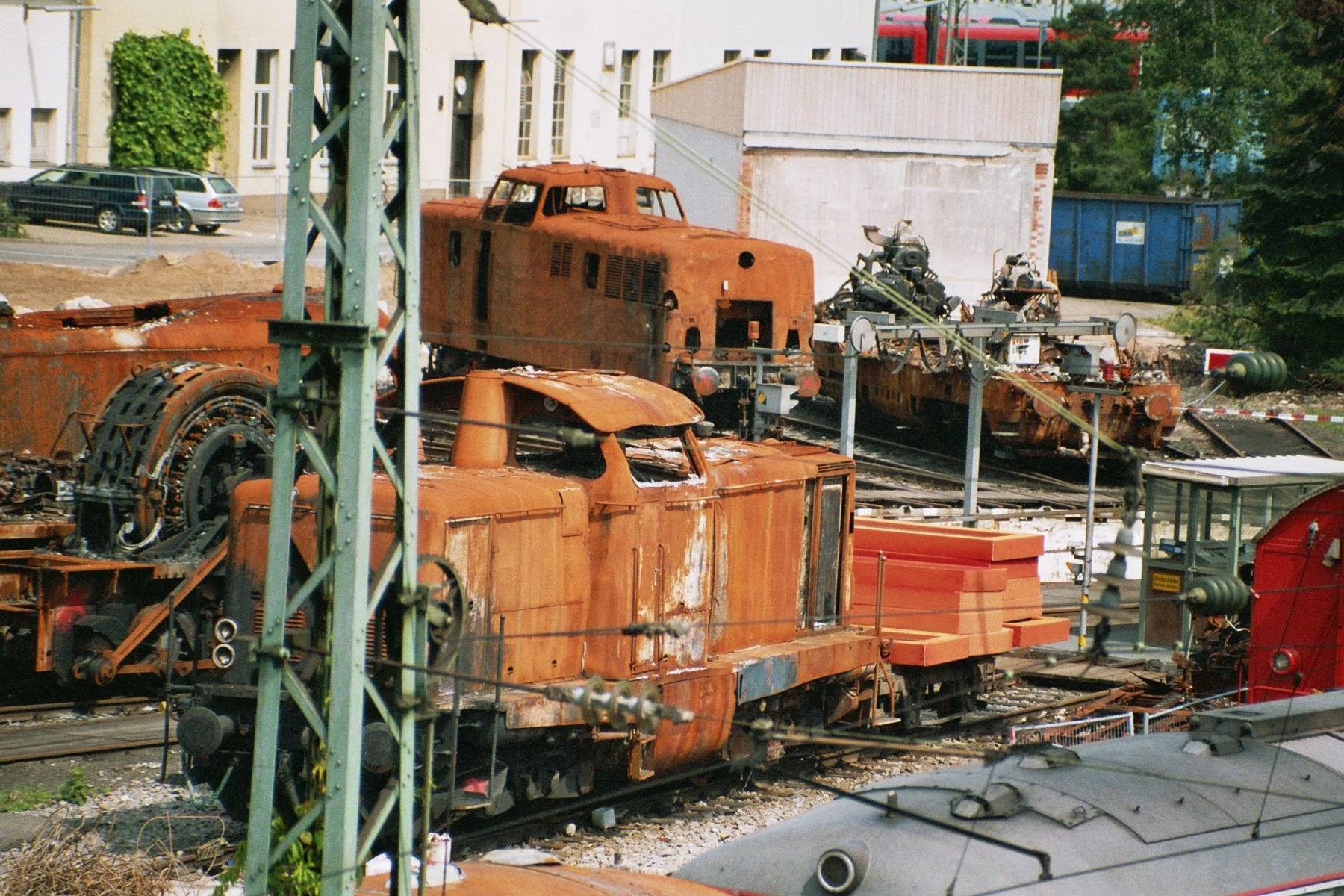
Aftermath of the Nuremberg Museum fire. The V80 is at the back.

One example, no. V 80 002, which the DB kept as a museum piece, was a victim of the big fire at the Nuremberg Transport Museum on 17 October 2005.

Since mid-October 2005 the first V 80 built by Krauss-Maffei has returned to Germany. No. V 80 001 was bought from a collector, who also owned the museum locomotive 212 203, and transferred from Italy back to Germany. It is intended to carry out a refurbishment of the locomotive as quickly as possible, so it can be made available as a museum locomotive.

As a replacement for V 80 002 which was burnt out in 2005 the DB Museum was given the last V 80 to be built, no. V 80 005, in June 2008 by its Italian owner in exchange for a Class 216 locomotive.

== See also ==
- Deutsche Bundesbahn
- List of Deutsche Bundesbahn locomotives and railbuses

== Bibliography ==
- Rossberg, Ralf (2013). Deutsche Eisenbahnfahrzeuge von 1838 Bis Heute. Springer.
