= Bavarian R 3/3 =

Bavarian R 3/3 DRG Class 89.7–8 ÖBB 789
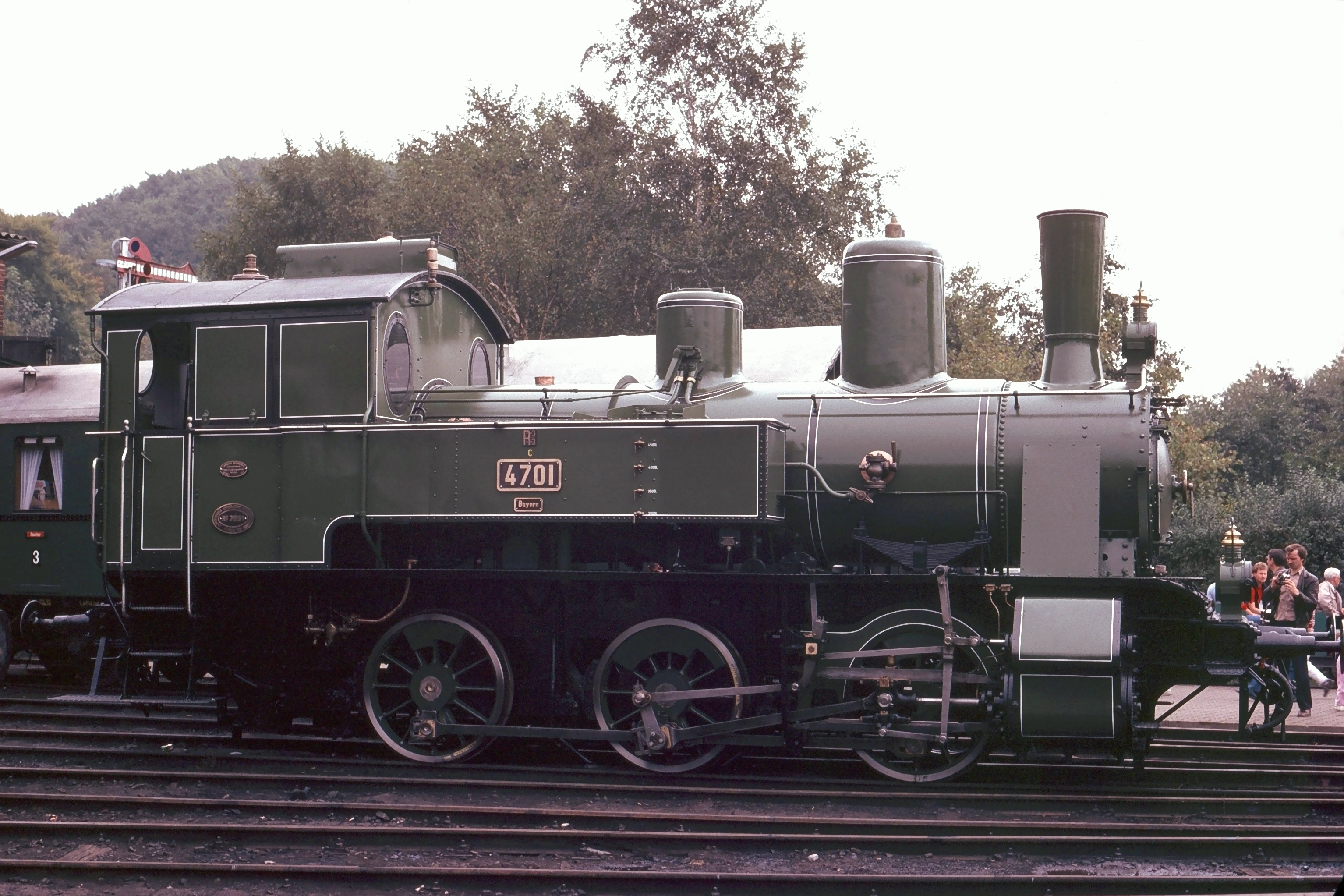
- Bavarian Class R 3/3, number 4701, later 89 801, in Bochum-Dahlhausen (1985)
Type and origin
- Builder: Krauss
- Build date: 1906–1907, 1913, 1921–1923
- Total produced: 1906–07 locos: 15; 1913 locos: 3; 1921–23 locos: 90; Total: 108
Specifications
- Configuration
  - Whyte: 0-6-0T
  - German: 1906–1913 locos: Gt 33.15; 1921–1923 locos: Gt 33.16
- Gauge: 1,435 mm (4 ft 8 1/2 in)
- Coupled dia.: 1,216 mm (3 ft 11 7/8 in)
- Length
  - Over beams: 1906–07 locos: 9,410 mm (30 ft 10 1/2 in); 1913 locos: 9,450 mm (31 ft 0 in); 1921–23 locos: 9,974 mm (32 ft 8 3/4 in)
- Axle load: 1906–07 locos: 14.9 t (14.7 long tons; 16.4 short tons); 1913 locos: 15.1 t (14.9 long tons; 16.6 short tons); 1921–23 locos: 15.9 t (15.6 long tons; 17.5 short tons)
- Adhesive weight: 1906–07 locos: 44.8 t (44.1 long tons; 49.4 short tons); 1913 locos: 45.3 t (44.6 long tons; 49.9 short tons); 1921–23 locos: 47.6 t (46.8 long tons; 52.5 short tons)
- Service weight: 1906–07 locos: 44.8 t (44.1 long tons; 49.4 short tons); 1913 locos: 45.3 t (44.6 long tons; 49.9 short tons); 1921–23 locos: 47.6 t (46.8 long tons; 52.5 short tons)
- Boiler pressure: 12 kgf/cm^{2} (1,180 kPa; 171 lbf/in^{2})
- Heating surface
  - Firebox: 1.61 m^{2} (17.3 sq ft)
  - Evaporative: 89.60 m^{2} (964.4 sq ft)
- Cylinders: Two, outside
- Cylinder size: 420 mm (16 9/16 in)
- Piston stroke: 610 mm (24 in)
Performance figures
- Maximum speed: 45 km/h (28 mph)
- Indicated power: 430 PS (316 kW; 424 hp)
Career
- Numbers: K.Bay.Sts.E.: 2473–2487, 2488–2490, 4701–4790; DRG: 89 701 – 89 714, 89 715 – 89 717, 89 801 – 89 890
- Retired: by 1964

The Bavarian Class R 3/3 of the Royal Bavarian State Railways (Königlich Bayerische Staatsbahn) was an 0-6-0T intended for goods trains. Of the engines delivered before World War I, one went to the Polish PKP, the other 17 were included by the Deutsche Reichsbahn as Class 89.7 in their numbering plan. The 90 units of the second series that were supplied from 1921 onwards all went into the Reichsbahn, and were designated as Class 89.8. 86 examples went into the Deutsche Bundesbahn after the Second World War and the last one was not taken out of service until 1960.

Numbers 89 835, 837 and 851 remained in Austria after the Second World War. The Austrian Federal Railway (Österreichische Bundesbahn or ÖBB) took them over as ÖBB Class 789 and designated them using their previous serial numbers. Numbers 789.835 and 837 were sold in 1956 as industrial locos, number 789.851 was retired in 1957. Finally number 789.837 returned to Bavaria and may be found today in the collection of the Bavarian Railway Museum (Bayerisches Eisenbahnmuseum) in Nördlingen.

No. 89 801 (ex K.Bay.Sts.B. 4701) belongs to the DB Museum fleet. It was damaged during the great fire on 17 October 2005 at Nuremberg and is being restored in Koblenz. (See photograph left).

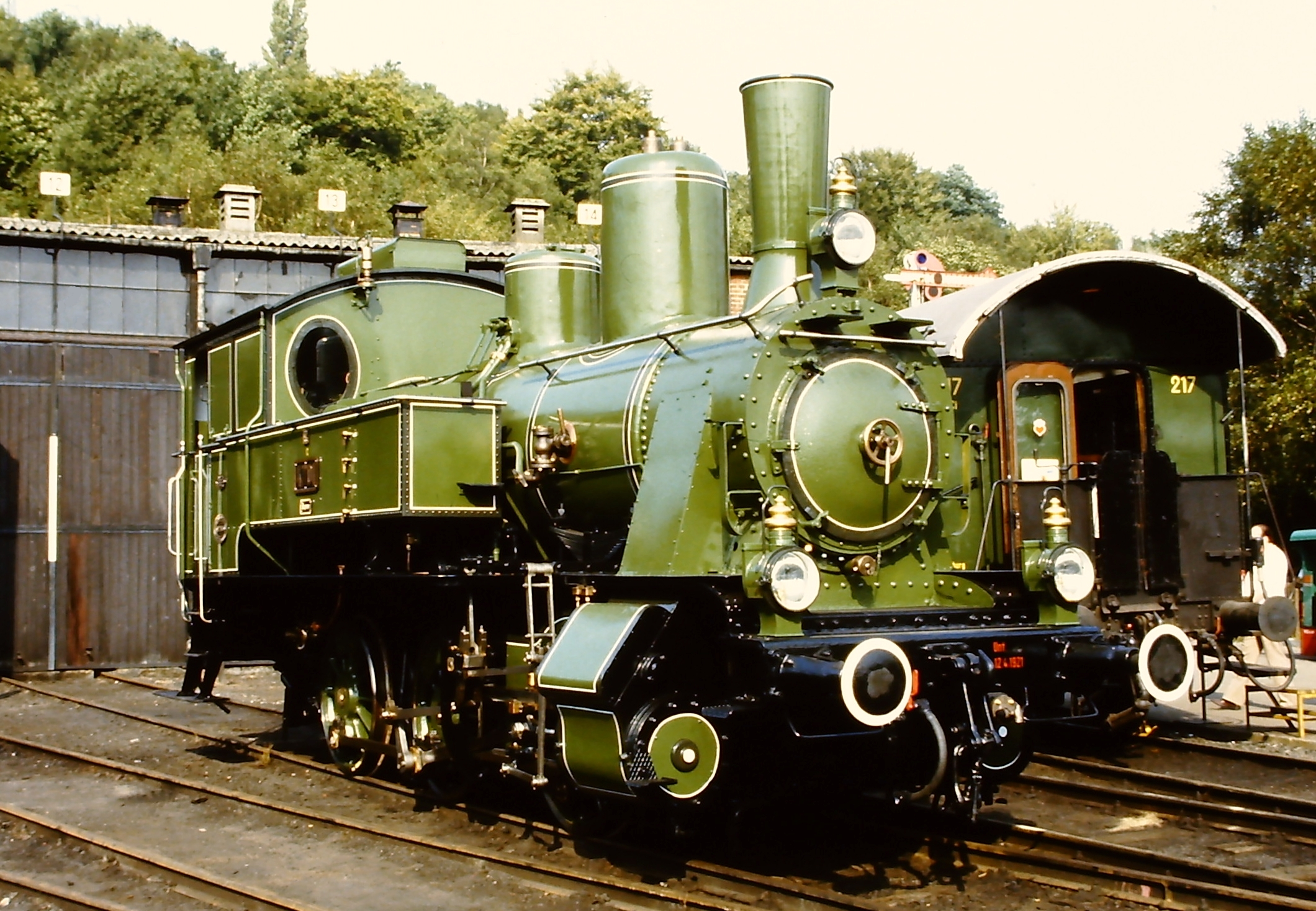
Bayer. R 3/3 4701 "150 Years of German Railways" Bochum-Dahlhausen

== See also ==
- Royal Bavarian State Railways
- List of Bavarian locomotives and railbuses
