= Henschel-BBC DE2500 =

Locomotive class

DB Class 202
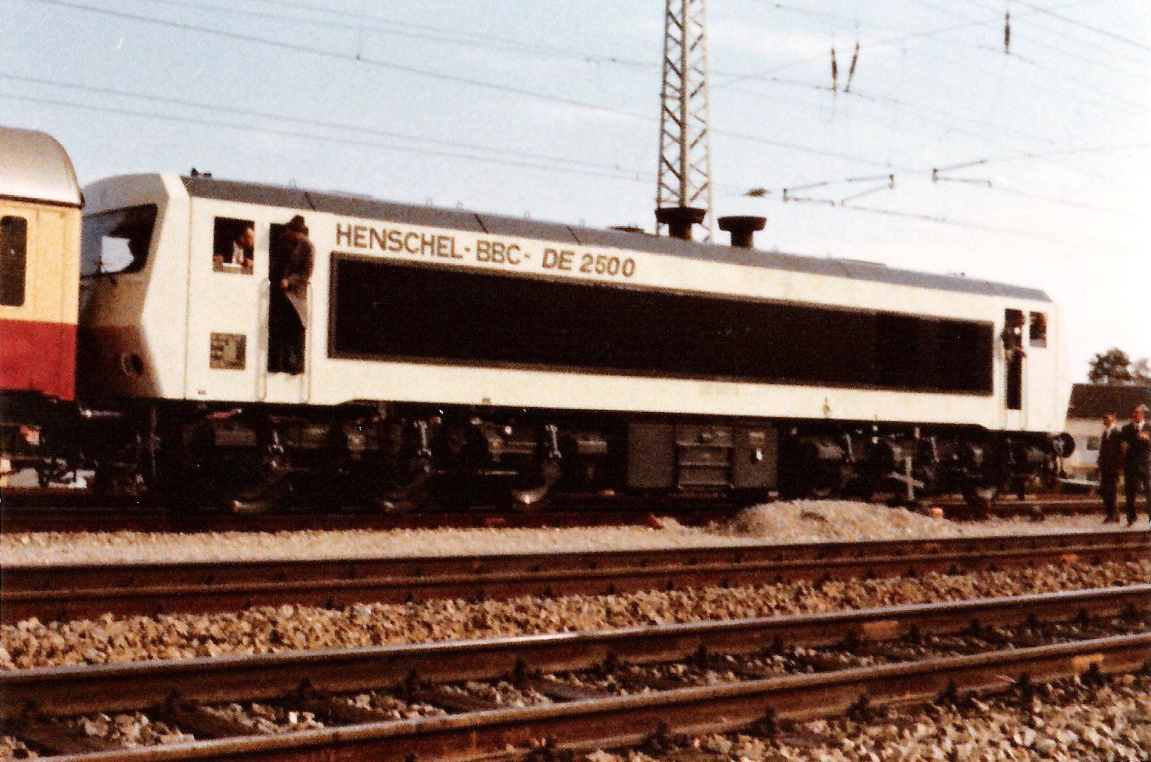
- DB 202 002
Type and origin
- Power type: Diesel-Electric
- Builder: Henschel, Brown, Boveri & Cie, MTU
- Serial number: 202 002, 003, 004
- Build date: 1971; 1974
- Total produced: 3 prototypes
Specifications
- Configuration
  - UIC: Bo′Bo′ (003), Co′Co′ (002, 004)
- Gauge: 1,435 mm (4 ft 8 1/2 in)
- Wheel diameter: 1,100 mm (43.31 in)
- Length: 18,000 mm (59 ft 0.7 in)
- Width: 3,070 mm (10 ft 0.87 in)
- Height: 4,280 mm (14 ft 0.50 in)
- Loco weight: 80 t (79 long tons; 88 short tons)
- Fuel type: Diesel
- Electric system/s: 3-phase rotary current (002, 003, 004); 1.5 kV DC Catenary (003 UmAn version)
- Current pickup: Pantograph (003 UmAn version)
- Prime mover: V12 diesel, (Henschel or MTU) (002, 003, 004)
- Aspiration: turbocharged
- Traction motors: Asynchronous rotary current
- MU working: yes
- Loco brake: Disc brakes, generator brake
- Train brakes: triple-release airbrakes
- Safety systems: SiFa, Indusi
Performance figures
- Maximum speed: 120 km/h (75 mph) (004) / 140 km/h (87 mph) (002, 003) / 250 km/h (160 mph) (003 UmAn version)
- Power output: 2,500 hp (1,900 kW)
- Tractive effort: starting : 278 kN (62,000 lb_{f}) (all), 175 kN (39,000 lb_{f}) (UmAn) continuous : 200 kN (45,000 lb_{f}) (all), 160 kN (36,000 lb_{f}) (UmAn)
Career
- Delivered: 1971, 1974
- First run: 1971
- Current owner: All preserved

The DB Class 202, also commonly referred to under its manufacturers' designation Henschel-BBC DE2500, since it was only in experimental use and never purchased by the DB, is a class of diesel-electric locomotives designed for use on main and secondary lines for both passenger and freight trains.

One unit was converted to 1.5 kV DC operation under electric catenary, and used for evaluation by the Nederlandse Spoorwegen, as NS Class 1600P.

== History ==
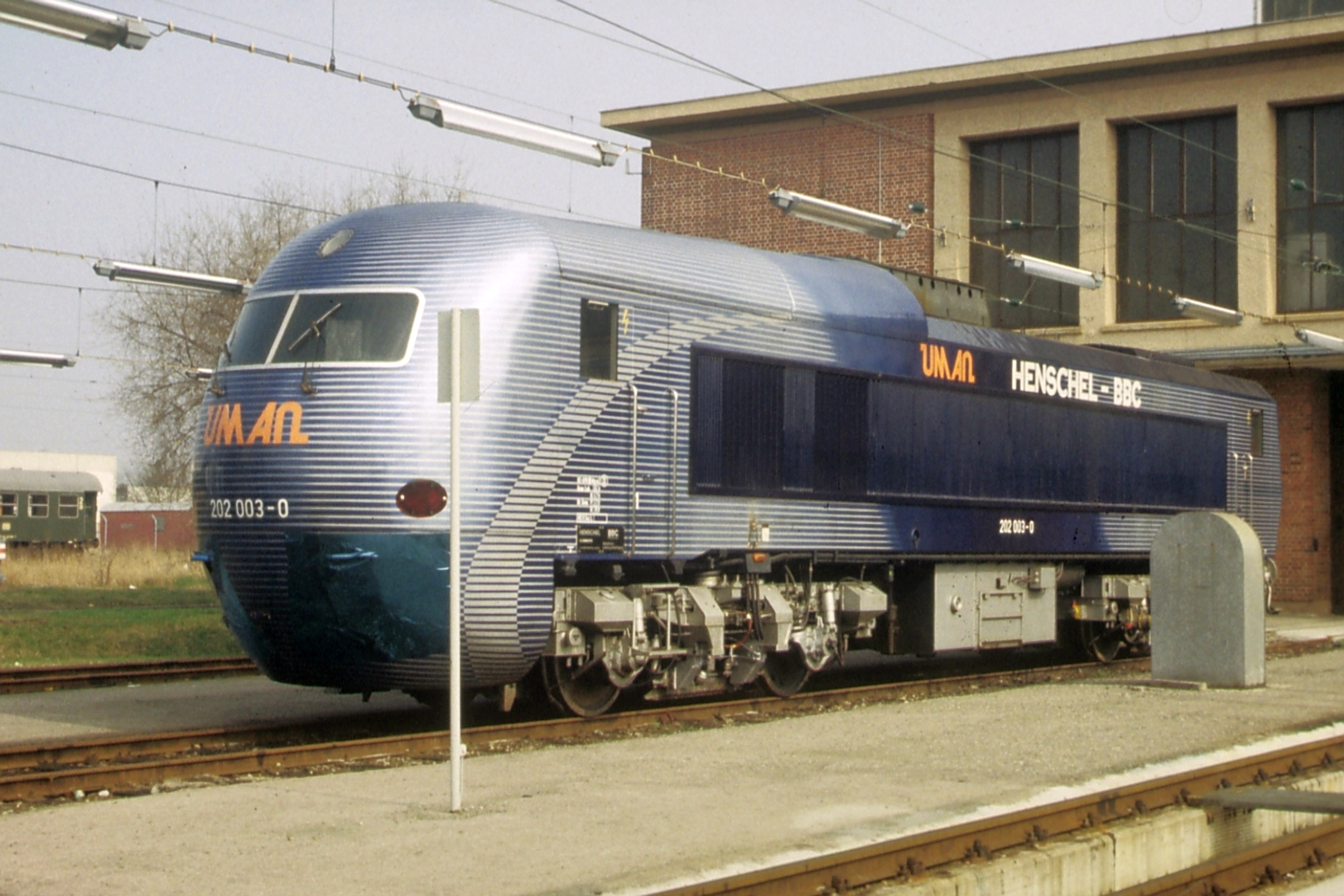
Streamlined DB 202 003

The class represents a major milestone in the German locomotive development, since these are the first locomotives to have three phase asynchronous electric traction applied in a mainline diesel-electric locomotive.

The DE2500 featured a light-weight and completely modular construction, which allowed the quick and easy exchange of whole sections of the locomotive, such as the prime mover, generator or alternator sections. It was both capable of driving on Co'Co' bogies (002, 004) as well as Bo'Bo' bogies (003). All the components of the electric sections - from generator to traction motors - were built to the latest state of the art featuring brushless, collectorless and nearly contactless operation, which resulted in long service intervals and high reliability.

The locomotives were extensively tested by the Deutsche Bundesbahn on its lines throughout Western Germany, starting in 1971 through the mid-1980s. They were stationed at Bw Mannheim with the following DB numbers:

- 202 002-2 (white)
- 202 003-0 (orange, later UmAn paint scheme)
- 202 004-8 (blue)

=== Conversion to electric locomotive ===
During the mid-1970s, locomotive 202-002 was converted for the Dutch Railways (NS) into an all-electric locomotive for 1.5 kV DC-overhead wire. It was painted in the Dutch yellow scheme, assigned the number 1600P and given the logos of the Dutch railways. A pantograph for the collection of the current from the overhead wire was installed, the diesel prime mover and the generator section were removed and replaced with ballast weight. The NS was very pleased with the results of the test cycles, but ultimately chose to acquire its serial-production Class 1600 from French manufacturers, based on the BB 7200, for both budget and delivery time considerations.

=== Test-run in Denmark ===
The Danish State Railways, DSB, tested the locomotive 202 004. The later acquired DSB Class ME, though heavier and stronger (115 t, 3.300 hp), were based on these prototypes. 37 of the class were built.

== Models ==
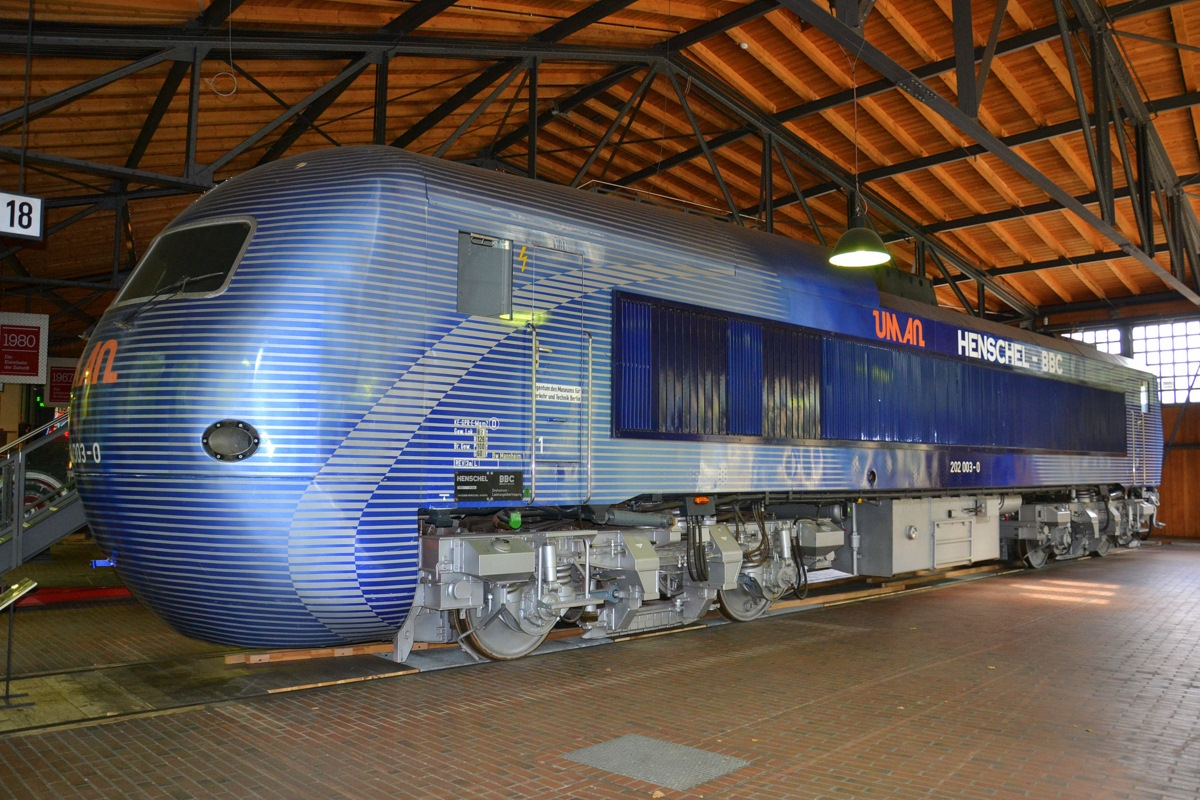
DB Class 202 003 in Berlin museum.

An H0 scale model engine has been made of the BR 202 by the German company Heris.

== Literature ==
- Matthias Maier (1997), Diesellokomotiven deutscher Eisenbahnen (in German), Düsseldorf: alba
- Markus Hehl, Eisenbahn-Kurier Special : Deutsche Diesellokomotiven (in German), Freiburg: EK-Verlag
- Karl Gerhard Baur: Die Geschichte der Drehstromlokomotiven. EK-Verlag, Freiburg, 2005. ISBN 3-88255-146-1
- BBC Asynchronous motor drive for Diesel locomotives Order No. D VK 40810 E
- Horst J. Obermayer: Diesellokomotiven - Mit Kleinlokomotiven, Stuttgart 1972.
