= DRG Class ET 25 =

Class of 39 German 3-car electric multiple units

DRG/DB Class ET/EM 25 DB Class 425/825 DR Class 285
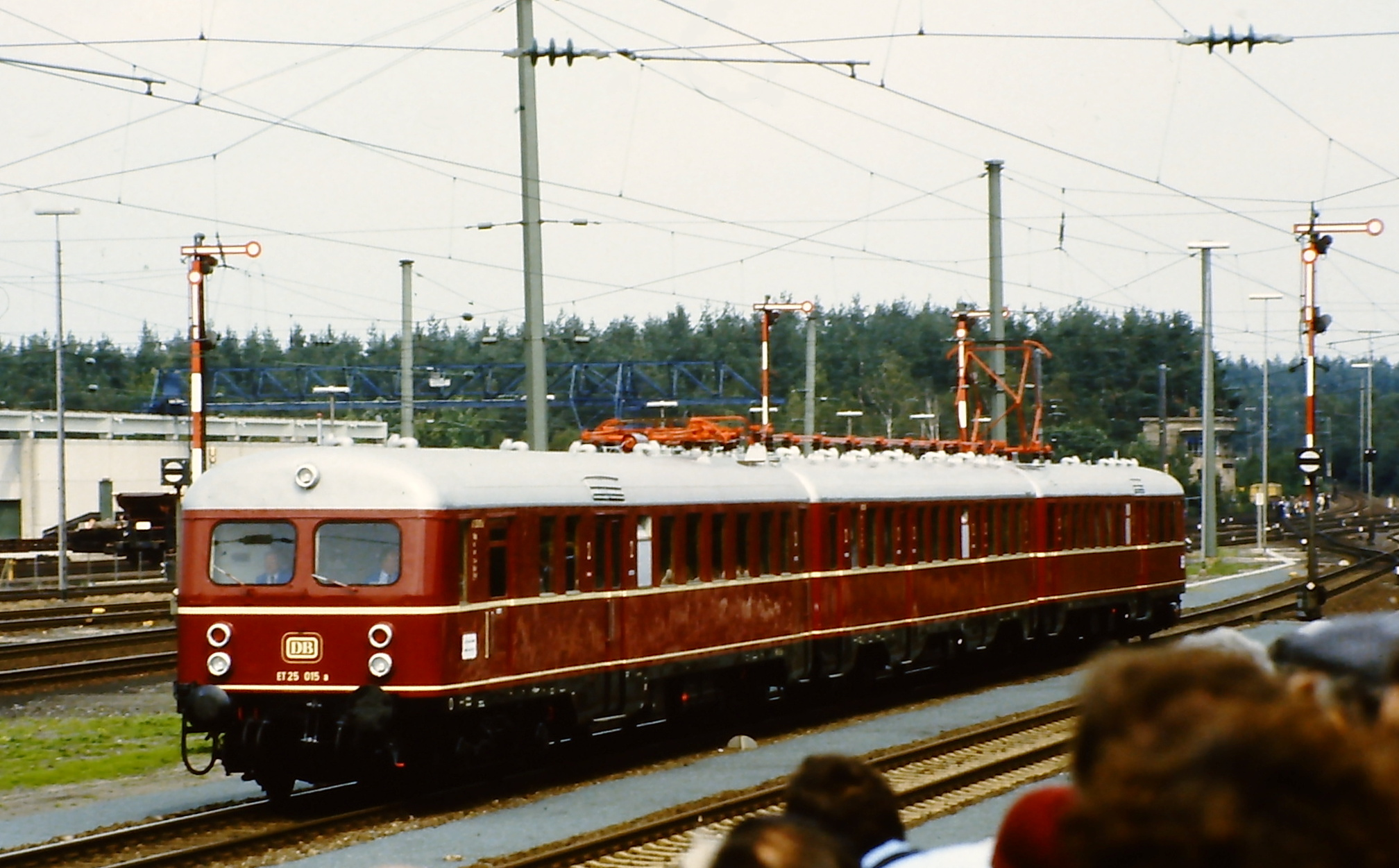
- ET 25 015 at the “150 Years of German railways” jubilee parade in Nuremberg
- In service: 1935 to 1972 (DR) and 1985 (DB)
- Constructed: 1935
- Number built: 39
- Fleet numbers: DRG elT 1801 - DRG ET 25 01 - DB 425 101 -
- Operators: Deutsche Reichsbahn-Gesellschaft; Deutsche Bundesbahn; Deutsche Reichsbahn (GDR)

Specifications
- Train length: 66.27 m (217 ft 5 in)
- Maximum speed: 120 km/h (75 mph)
- Weight: 125.0 tonnes (123.0 long tons; 137.8 short tons)
- Electric system(s): 15 kV 16 2/3 Hz AC
- Current collection: pantograph
- UIC classification: Bo′2′+2′2′+2′Bo′
- Track gauge: 1,435 mm (4 ft 8 1/2 in)

The ET 25 was a series of electric multiple units built in the 1930s by the Deutsche Reichsbahn-Gesellschaft.

== History ==
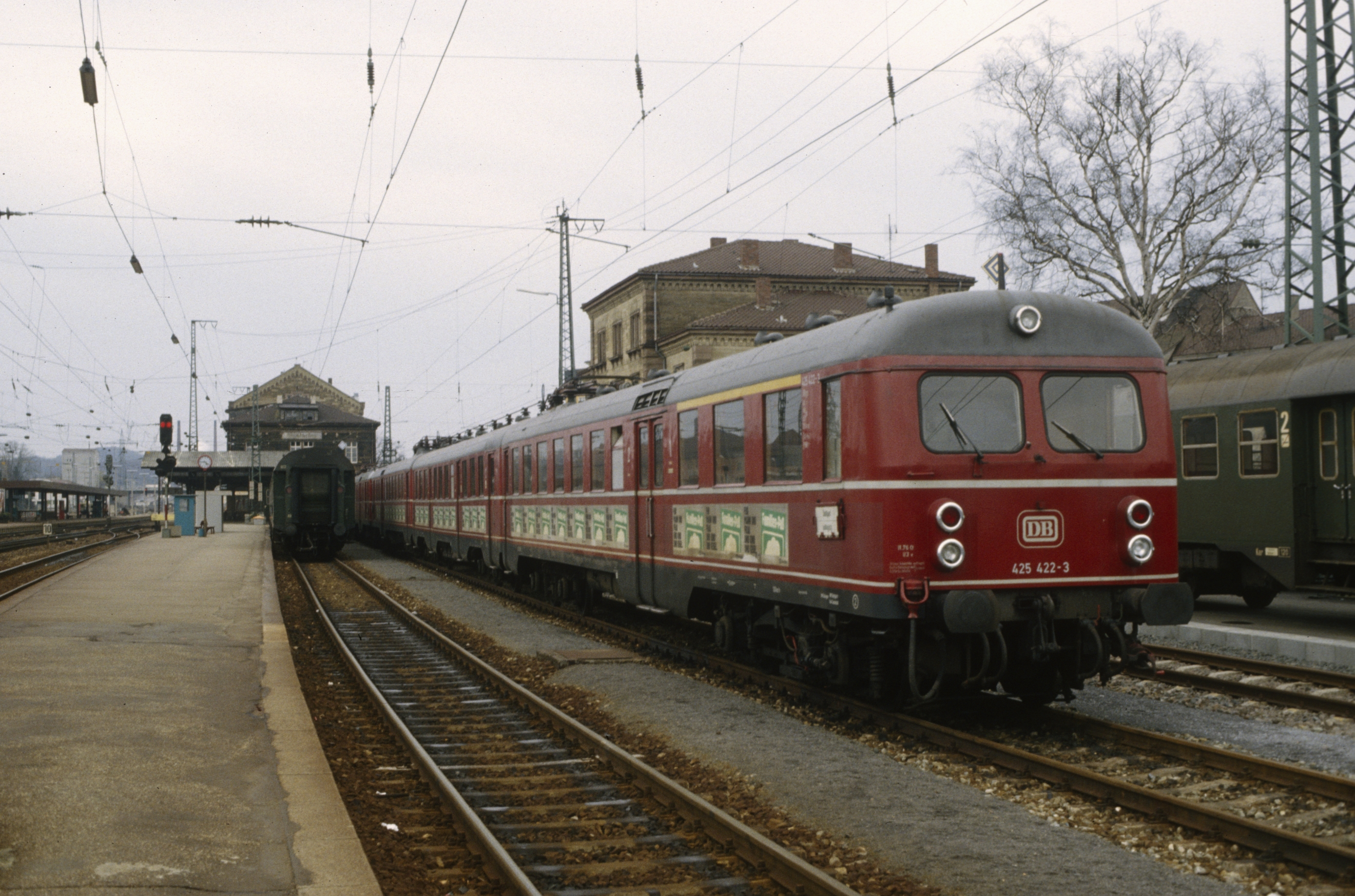
In 1983 in Mühlacker.

Some of the trains were used after World War II by the Deutsche Bundesbahn of West Germany, where they would be renamed to Class 425 in 1968. The last units were decommissioned in 1985; two units went to the DB Museum.
