= Bavarian EP 1 =

Bavarian EP 1 DR Class E 62
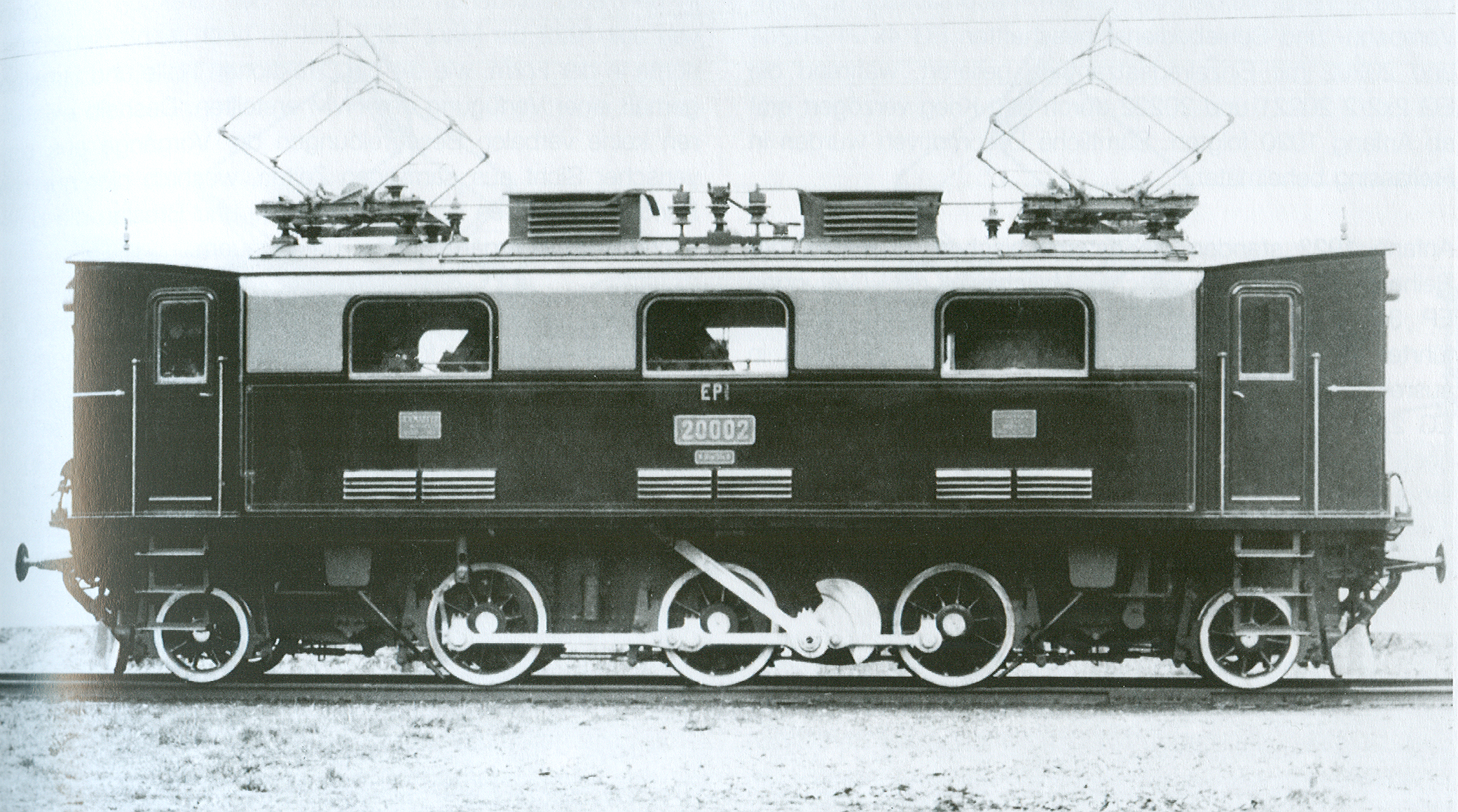
Type and origin
- Builder: J. A. Maffei (mechanical); Maffei-Schwartzkopff-Werke GmbH (electrical)
- Build date: 1912
- Total produced: 5
Specifications
- Configuration
  - UIC: 1′C1′
- Gauge: 1,435 mm (4 ft 8 1/2 in)
- Driver dia.: 1,050 mm (3 ft 5 3/8 in)
- Carrying wheel diameter: 850 mm (2 ft 9 1/2 in)
- Wheelbase
  - Overall: 9,000 mm (29 ft 6 1/4 in)
- Length
  - Over beams: 12,400 mm (40 ft 8 1/4 in)
- Axle load: 15.5 t (15.3 long tons; 17.1 short tons)
- Adhesive weight: 46.5 t (45.8 long tons; 51.3 short tons)
- Service weight: 72.5 t (71.4 long tons; 79.9 short tons)
- Electric system/s: 15 kV 16 2/3 Hz AC catenary
- Current pickup(s): 2 pantographs
- Traction motors: 1
- Transmission: Side rod drive
- Train control: Rotary, or variable, transformer 11 steps
- Loco brake: compressed air 2 hand brakes
Performance figures
- Maximum speed: 45 km/h (28 mph)
- Power output
  - 1 hour: 965 PS (710 kW; 952 hp)
  - Continuous: 600 PS (441 kW; 592 hp)
- Tractive effort
  - Starting: 131 kN (29,400 lbf)
Career
- Numbers: K.Bay.Sts.E.: 20001 – 20005; DRG: E 62 01 – E 62 05
- Retired: from 1939 (E 62 03) to 1955 (E 62 001)

The electric passenger train locomotives of Bavarian Class EP 3/5 were the first electric locomotives designed for single-phase AC, 15 kV, 16 2/3 Hz working for the Royal Bavarian State Railways. The first electrical services in Bavaria were on the Murnau–Oberammergau line using 5 kV and 16 Hz on 1 January 1905. After 1918 they were reclassified as EP1 20 001 – 005 and taken over by the DR as E 62 01 – 05.

== History ==
On 1 July 1912 operations began on the line from Garmisch to Scharnitz and, on 28 October 1912, electric services started. From 28 May 1913 electric trains also started running on the Garmisch and Reutte in Tirol railway. For this purpose five locomotives of Class EP 3/5 20 001 – 005 were purchased by the Bavarian state railway and placed in service in 1913. They mainly worked the section from Garmisch to Reutte. For the opening of electric services on the line from Bad Reichenhall to Berchtesgaden one engine (EP 3/5 20 001) was loaned to Freilassing. The engines proved themselves well in service and were stationed at the Garmisch locomotive depot; some were still in service until 1955.

Three engines remained in service with the Deutsche Bundesbahn after the Second World War; the others had been retired in 1939 and 1941. The last one to be paid off was no. E 62 001 in 1955. It was stored until 1965 in the Freimann repair shop and later dismantled.

The drive unit of no. E 62 001 has been preserved in the Nuremberg Transport Museum. During the fire in the Nuremberg-Gostenhof roundhouse in 2005 it was badly damaged.

== Technology ==
A slow-running, large series-wound motor with 28 poles and two commutators drove the wheels, without any gear reduction, via an unsprung jackshaft. The jackshaft was linked by a coupling rod to three driving axles housed in the locomotive frame. The axle base of the driving axles was 2000 mm. The jackshaft was located between the first and second driving axles. The first and third driving axles were fixed to the frame, the centre one had transverse play to facilitate curve running. The mass was further distributed to two carrying axles that were designed as Adams axles. Control was achieved by means of a variable transformer (Drehtransformator) and power circuit breaker (Lastschalter) with 11 steps.

The locomotive body had a wedge-shaped driver's cab at each end. The end walls had, as was common for the Bavarian state railways, centre doors and gangways. The side walls had three windows with ventilation slits beneath them. Instead of a steam heating boiler for the train heating (as on the Class EP 3/6 20 101–104, EP 3, E 36.1) there was already a connection for electric train heating.
