= DB Class VT 12.5 =

DB Class VT 12.5 DB Class 612/912
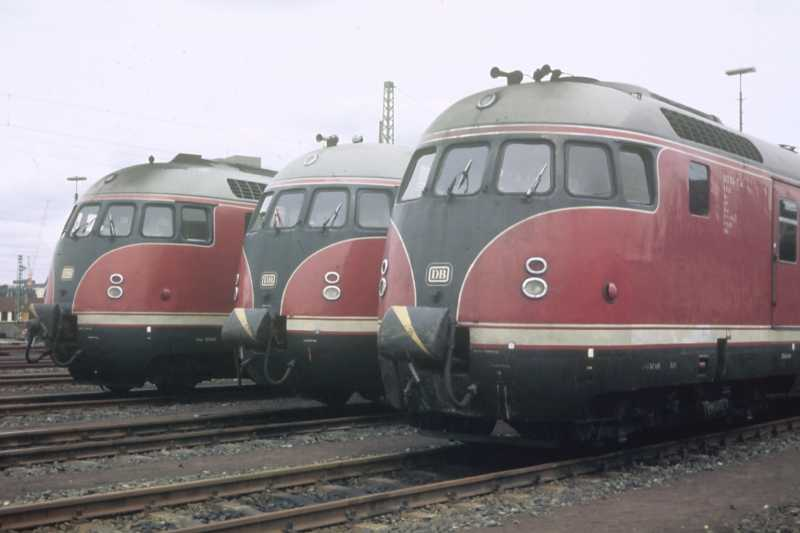
- Classes 612 (VT12.5) and 613 (VT12.6, ex VT08.5) at the Brunswick depot in 1983
- In service: 1953–1985
- Manufacturer: Waggonfabrik Josef Rathgeber (except 1957 VMs: Waggon- und Maschinenbau GmbH Donauwörth)
- Constructed: 1953 (VT+VM+VS × 4), 1957 (remainder)
- Number built: VT: 12; VM: 13; VS: 4 (+5 from VT 08.5)
- Number in service: Nil
- Number preserved: VT: 2; VM: 2
- Formation: 2-car: VT+VS; 3-car: VT+VM+VS; 3-car: VT+VM+VT; 4-car: VT+VM+VM+VT
- Fleet numbers: VT12 501–512 → 612 501–512; VM12 501–513 → 912 501–513; VS12 501–504 → 912 601–604; VS12 505–509 → 913 609–613
- Operators: DB

Specifications
- Train length: 3-car: 77.81 m (255 ft 3 in)
- Maximum speed: 140 km/h (87 mph)
- Weight: 3-car: 121.4 tonnes (119.5 long tons; 133.8 short tons)
- Transmission: diesel-hydraulic
- UIC classification: 3-car: B′2′+2′2′+2′2′
- Safety system(s): Sifa / Indusi I54

The VT 12^{5} is a former diesel multiple unit commissioned by the Deutsche Bundesbahn from 1953 onwards. It was commonly used with either two or three car configurations, using the VM 12 middle car and VS 12 driving van trailer. Three-car trains were usually made up of two motor units and one unpowered middle car. The trainsets were routinely made up from twelve driving cars, four control cars and 13 middle cars and used in city express services. The VT 12^{5} was used in regional traffic, with first and second class saloon seating. From 1968 the VT 12^{5} bore the EDV class number 612, the VT 12^{6} was redesignated as the Class 613. After initially operating from Cologne and Dortmund the DMUs were based for many years at the Hamburg-Altona railway depot and, from 1982, stationed at the Brunswick depot.
