= Bavarian G 3/4 H =

Bavarian G 3/4 H DRG Class 54.15–17 ÖBB 654
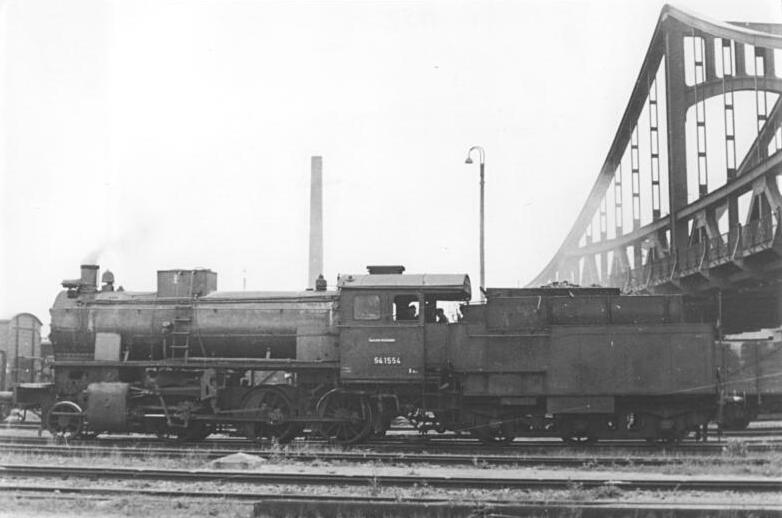
- No. 54 1554, an ex-Bavarian G 3/4 H, on 7 August 1952
Type and origin
- Builder: Maffei (160); Krauss (65)
- Build date: 1919–1923
- Total produced: 225
Specifications
- Configuration
  - Whyte: 2-6-0
- Gauge: 1,435 mm (4 ft 8 1/2 in)
- Leading dia.: 950 mm (3 ft 1 3/8 in)
- Driver dia.: 1,350 mm (4 ft 5 1/8 in)
- Length
  - Over beams: 17,500 mm (57 ft 5 in)
- Axle load: 16.7 t (16.4 long tons; 18.4 short tons)
- Adhesive weight: 49.8 t (49.0 long tons; 54.9 short tons)
- Service weight: 62.2 t (61.2 long tons; 68.6 short tons)
- Water cap.: 18.2 m^{3} (4,000 imp gal; 4,800 US gal)
- Boiler pressure: 13 kgf/cm^{2} (1.27 MPa; 185 lbf/in^{2})
- Heating surface
  - Firebox: 2.64 m^{2} (28.4 sq ft)
  - Evaporative: 130.97 m^{2} (1,409.7 sq ft)
- Superheater
  - Heating area: 36.65 m^{2} (394.5 sq ft)
- Cylinders: 2
- Cylinder size: 520 mm (20 1/2 in)
- Piston stroke: 630 mm (24 13/16 in)
Performance figures
- Maximum speed: 65 km/h (40 mph)
- Indicated power: 1,040 PS (765 kW; 1,030 hp)
Career
- Numbers: K.Bay.Sts.E.: 7001–7225; DRG: 54 1501 – 54 1725
- Retired: 1966

The Class G 3/4 H was a steam locomotive of the Royal Bavarian State Railways (Königlich Bayerische Staatsbahn) built between 1919 and 1923.

== Description and employment ==
Its striking features in comparison with the G 3/4 N were its superheater system, the feedwater preheater, the larger and higher-positioned boiler and its Adams axle. In addition, they were more powerful and efficient than their predecessors. All 225 examples that were built were taken over by the Bavarian Group Administration within the Reichsbahn and were initially operated under their old numbers. Later they were given operating numbers 54 1501–1725 following the final renumbering plan issued by the DRG. The majority of locomotives also survived the Second World War. The last engine (with operating number 54 1632) was not retired until 1966.

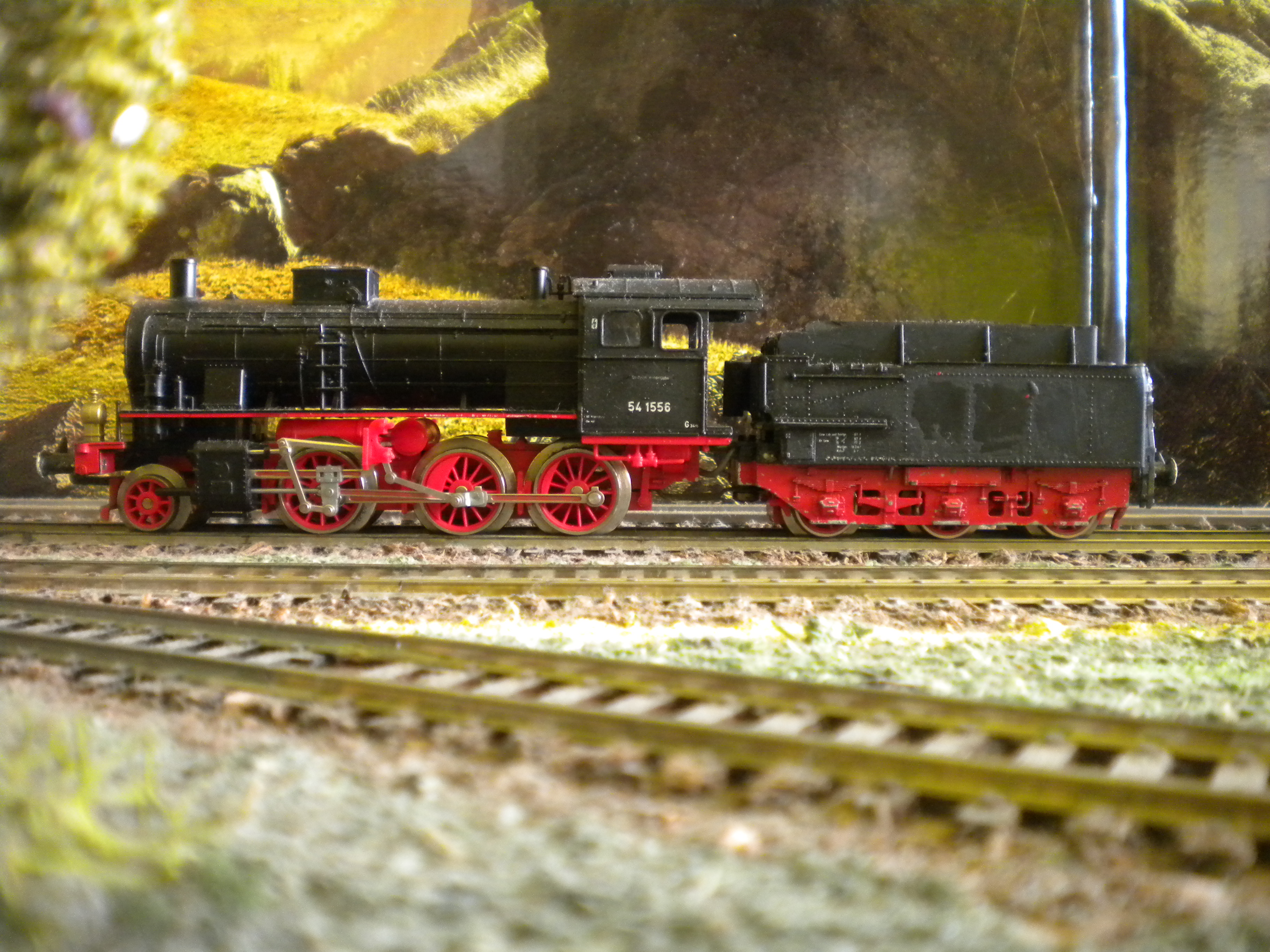
Model of a Bavarian G 3/4 H in DRG livery

Numbers 54.1534, 1548, 1550, 1559, 1589 and 1663 remained in Austria after the war. The ÖBB added them to their fleet and ran them as ÖBB Class 654. All engines in this class were retired by 1957. Number 654.1663 was reassigned in 1956 as an industrial locomotive in the main workshop at Simmering, where it received the number 913.502.

The engines were equipped with a Bavarian 3 T 18,2 tender.

== Surviving locomotives ==
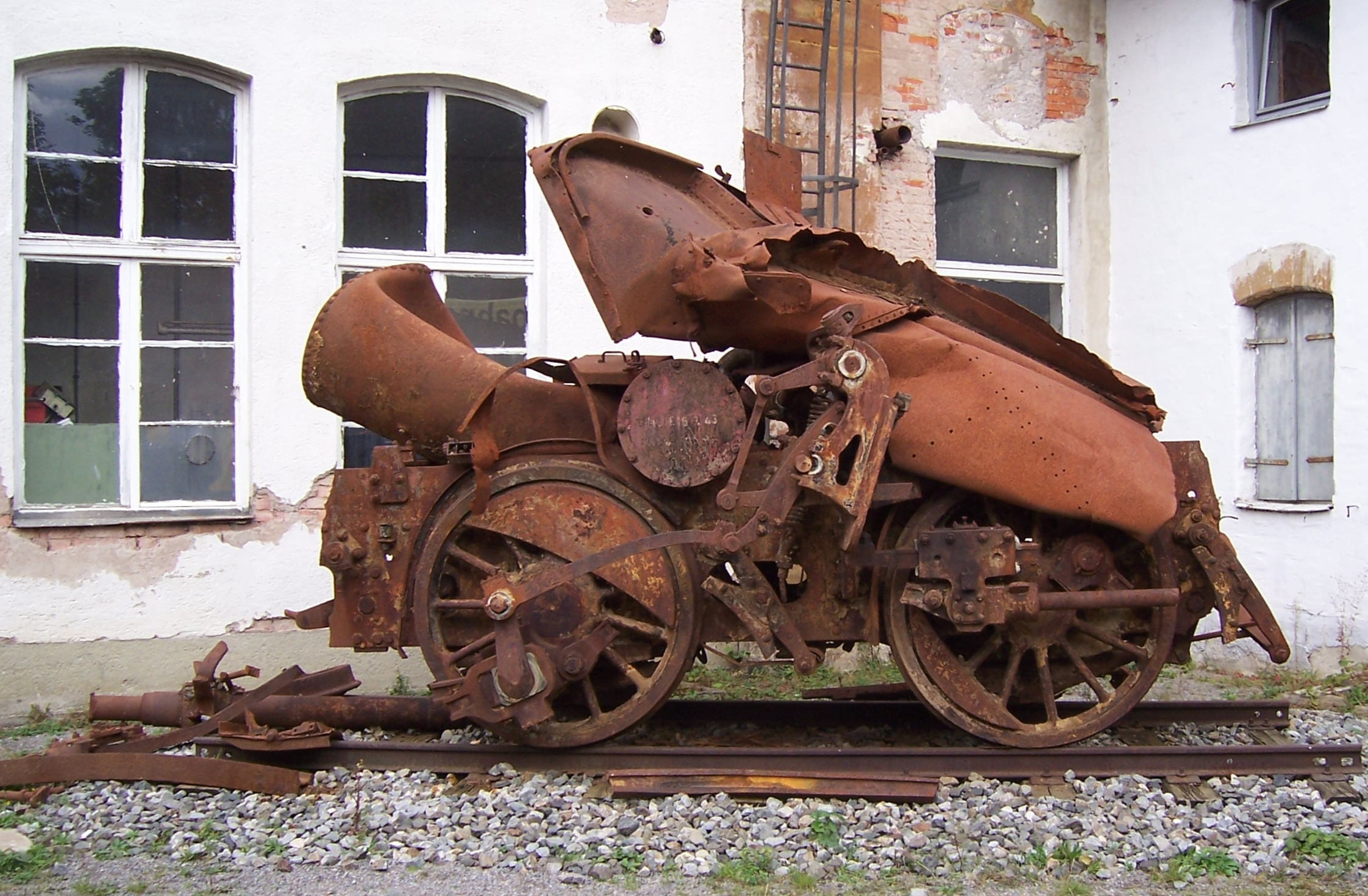
Remains of a G 3/4 in the Bavarian Railway Museum in Nördlingen

In 2004 the remains of a G 3/4 with works number 5395 was discovered during construction work in Treuchtlingen Station. The locomotive from the fleet based at the Munich shed was destroyed during an air raid on 11 April 1945 and buried in a bomb crater during clear up work.

The remains of the locomotive – part of the tender, the feedwater heater and pressure vessel and the first and second axles – area displayed in the Bavarian Railway Museum.

== See also ==
- Royal Bavarian State Railways
- List of Bavarian locomotives and railbuses
