= Palatine R 4/4 =

Palatine R 4/4 Bavarian R 4/4 DRG Class 92.20
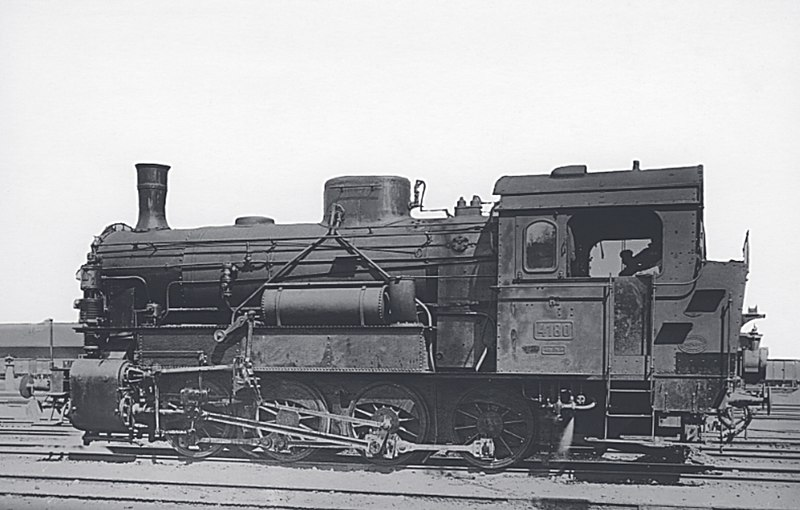
- Bavarian R 4/4 No. 4188
Type and origin
- Power type: Steam
- Builder: Lokomotivfabrik Krauss & Comp.
- Serial number: 6833–6836, 7026–7030, 7407–7436, 7707–7709, 8290–8298
- Build date: 1913–1915 (Palatinate); 1918–1925 (Bavaria)
- Total produced: 51
Specifications
- Configuration
  - Whyte: 0-8-0T
  - UIC: D n2t
  - German: Pfalz & Bay. 4151–4183: Gt 44.16; Bay. 4184–4192: Gt 44.17
- Gauge: 1,435 mm (4 ft 8 1/2 in)
- Driver dia.: 1,216 mm (3 ft 11 7/8 in)
- Wheelbase
  - Drivers: 4,500 mm (14 ft 9 1/8 in)
- Length
  - Over buffers: Pfalz & Bay. 4151–4170: 10,840 mm (35 ft 6 3/4 in); Bay. 4171–4192: 11,042 mm (36 ft 2 3/4 in)
- Axle load: Pfalz & Bay. 4151–4183: 16.7 t (16.4 long tons; 18.4 short tons); Bay. 4184–4192: 17.5 t (17.2 long tons; 19.3 short tons)
- Adhesive weight: Pfalz & Bay. 4151–4183: 66.9 t (65.8 long tons; 73.7 short tons); Bay. 4184–4192: 70.0 t (68.9 long tons; 77.2 short tons)
- Service weight: Pfalz & Bay. 4151–4183: 66.9 t (65.8 long tons; 73.7 short tons); Bay. 4184–4192: 70.0 t (68.9 long tons; 77.2 short tons)
- Fuel type: Coal
- Fuel capacity: Pfalz: 1.7 t (1.7 long tons; 1.9 short tons); Bay. 4151–4170: 1.95 t (1.92 long tons; 2.15 short tons); Bay. 4171–4183: 1.75 t (1.72 long tons; 1.93 short tons); Bay. 4184–4192: 2.2 t (2.2 long tons; 2.4 short tons)
- Water cap.: Pfalz: 7.5 m^{3} (1,600 imp gal; 2,000 US gal); Bay. 4151–4183: 7.6 m^{3} (1,700 imp gal; 2,000 US gal); Bay. 4184–4192: 9.0 m^{3} (2,000 imp gal; 2,400 US gal)
- Firebox
  - Grate area: 2.02 m^{2} (21.7 sq ft)
- Boiler
  - Tube plates: 4,000 mm (13 ft 1 1/2 in)
  - Small tubes: 45 mm (1 3/4 in), 232 off
- Boiler pressure: 12 bar (12.2 kg/cm^{2}; 174 lbf/in^{2})
- Heating surface
  - Firebox: 8.48 m^{2} (91.3 sq ft)
  - Tubes: 116.62 m^{2} (1,255.3 sq ft)
  - Total surface: 125.10 m^{2} (1,346.6 sq ft)
- Cylinders: Two, outside
- Cylinder size: 530 mm × 650 mm (20 7/8 in × 25 9/16 in)
- Loco brake: Hand brakes on the front three axles (originally), Westinghouse compressed-air brakes
Performance figures
- Maximum speed: 45 km/h (28 mph)
- Indicated power: 419 kW (570 PS; 562 hp)
Career
- Numbers: Pfalz 123^{(II)}…159^{(II)}; Bayern 4151–4192; DRG 92 2001 – 92 2049
- Retired: 1962

The physically identical Palatine and Bavarian Class R 4/4 engines of the Royal Bavarian State Railways (Königlich Bayerische Staats-Eisenbahnen) were goods train tank locomotives with four coupled axles and no carrying axles. The first nine machines were built for the Palatinate Railway (Pfalzbahn) in 1913 and 1915 as the Palatine Class R 4, the remainder from 1918 to 1925 as Bavarian R 4/4 engines.

The first nine machines were built as the Palatinate R 4/4 in 1913 and 1915 for the Palatinate Railway, the remainder in years 1918/19 and 1924/25 as the Bavarian R 4/4. Structurally they were similar to the Baden X b. A peculiarity was the high boiler, under which the water tank was also located. Sand dome and steam dome formed a single structural unit. The locomotives could haul up to 1,000 tons on the level. On a gradient of 5‰ and a load of 246 tons a speed of 45 km/h was achieved. The last series differed from its predecessors in that the arrangement of the domes and the water box was changed.

In 1925 seven Palatine R 4/4 with operating numbers 92 2001 to 92 2007 and all the Bavarian R 4/4 with operating numbers 92 2008 to 92 2049 were incorporated by the Deutsche Reichsbahn into their numbering plan as Class 92.20.

The first Palatine engines began to be taken out of service from the mid-1930s; the last ones in the 1950s. In 1962 the last one, No. 2024, stabled in Nuremberg was retired.

== See also ==
- Royal Bavarian State Railways
- List of Bavarian locomotives and railbuses

== Literature ==
- Schnabel, Heinz (1987). Eisenbahn-Fahrzeug-Archiv Band 2.5: Lokomotiven bayerischer Eisenbahnen (in German). Düsseldorf: Alba Publikation Alf Teloeken GmbH + Co KG. pp. 297–298, 389. ISBN 3-87094-105-7.
- Weisbrod, Manfred; Müller, Hans; Petznik, Wolfgang (1978). Dampflokomotiven deutscher Eisenbahnen, Baureihe 60–96 (EFA 1.3) (in German) (4th ed.). Düsseldorf: Alba. pp. 191–194. ISBN 3-87094-083-2.
