= DRG Class 86 =

Class of 775 German 2-8-2T locomotives

DRG Class 86 ÖBB 86 PKP Tkt3 ČSD 455.2
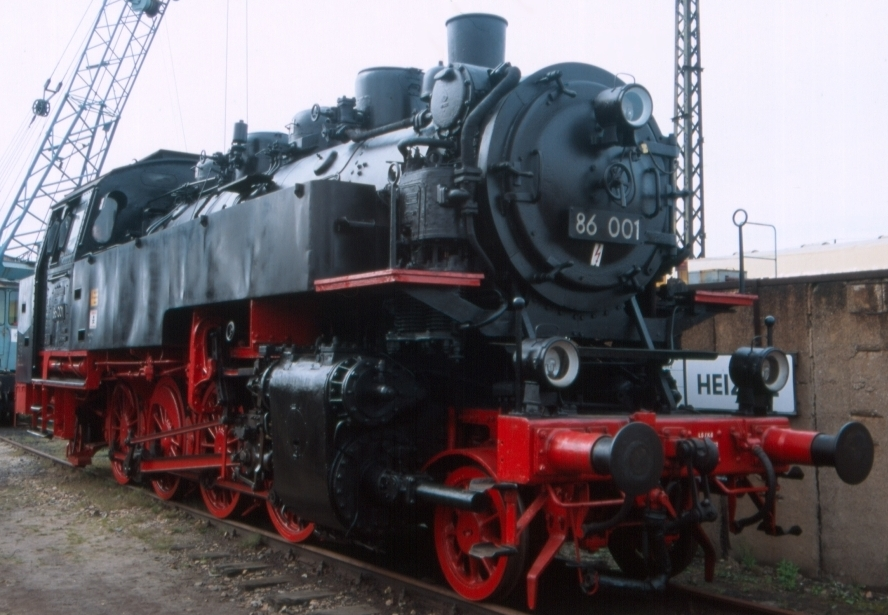
- 86 001 in Chemnitz-Hilbersdorf
Type and origin
- Power type: Steam
- Builder: MG Karlsruhe (11); Linke-Hofmann (5); F. Schichau (118); Friedr. Krupp AG (62); Maschinenfabrik Esslingen (23); Borsig (60); Henschel & Sohn (93); BMAG (75); Orenstein & Koppel (64); Lokomotivfabrik Floridsdorf (192); DWM Posen (73)
- Build date: 1928–1943
- Total produced: 776
Specifications
- Configuration
  - Whyte: 2-8-2T
  - UIC: 1′D1′ h2t
  - German: Gt 46.15
- Gauge: 1,435 mm (4 ft 8 1/2 in)
- Leading dia.: 850 mm (2 ft 9 1/2 in)
- Driver dia.: 1,400 mm (4 ft 7 1/8 in)
- Trailing dia.: 850 mm (2 ft 9 1/2 in)
- Minimum curve: 140 m (460 ft)
- Wheelbase
  - Axle spacing (Asymmetrical): 2,600 mm (8 ft 6 3/8 in) +; 1,700 mm (5 ft 6 7/8 in) +; 1,700 mm (5 ft 6 7/8 in) +; 1,700 mm (5 ft 6 7/8 in) +; 2,600 mm (8 ft 6 3/8 in) =
  - Engine: 10,300 mm (33 ft 9 1/2 in)
- Length
  - Over headstocks: 001–229: 12,520 mm (41 ft 7/8 in); 230–966: 12,620 mm (41 ft 4 7/8 in)
  - Over buffers: 001–229: 13,820 mm (45 ft 4 1/8 in); 230–966: 13,920 mm (45 ft 8 in)
- Height: 4,165 mm (13 ft 8 in)
- Axle load: 14.9–15.2 t (14.7–15.0 long tons; 16.4–16.8 short tons)
- Adhesive weight: 59.4–60.6 t (58.5–59.6 long tons; 65.5–66.8 short tons)
- Empty weight: 68.0–70.0 t (66.9–68.9 long tons; 75.0–77.2 short tons)
- Service weight: 83.0–88.5 t (81.7–87.1 long tons; 91.5–97.6 short tons)
- Fuel type: Coal
- Fuel capacity: 4.0 t (3.9 long tons; 4.4 short tons)
- Water cap.: 9.0 m^{3} (1,980 imp gal; 2,380 US gal)
- Firebox
  - Grate area: 2.34–2.39 m^{2} (25.2–25.7 sq ft)
- Boiler
  - Pitch: 2,700 mm (8 ft 10 1/4 in)
  - Tube plates: 4,500 mm (14 ft 9 1/8 in)
  - Small tubes: 44.5 mm (1 3/4 in), 110 off
  - Large tubes: 133 mm (5 1/4 in), 26 off
- Boiler pressure: 14 kgf/cm^{2} (13.7 bar; 199 psi)
- Heating surface
  - Firebox: 10.0 m^{2} (108 sq ft)
  - Tubes: 61.4 m^{2} (661 sq ft)
  - Flues: 45.9 m^{2} (494 sq ft)
  - Total surface: 117.3 m^{2} (1,263 sq ft)
- Superheater
  - Heating area: 47.0 m^{2} (506 sq ft)
- Cylinders: Two, outside
- Cylinder size: 570 mm × 660 mm (22 7/16 in × 26 in)
- Valve gear: Heusinger (Walschaerts)
- Loco brake: Knorr single-chamber, compressed-air brake with auxiliary brake
- Parking brake: Exter counterweight brake
Performance figures
- Maximum speed: 001–233: 70 km/h (43 mph); 234–966: 80 km/h (50 mph)
- Indicated power: 1,030 PS (758 kW; 1,020 hp)
Career
- Operators: Deutsche Reichsbahn
- Numbers: 86 001 – 86 591; 86 606 – 86 627; 86 698 – 86 816; 86 835 – 86 875; 86 966; Bentheimer Eisenbahn 41 (was 86 817); Eutin-Lübecker Eisenbahn 15 (3rd) [1942 to DR 86 1000]
- Retired: 1945–1972

The DRG Class 86 was a standard (see Einheitsdampflokomotive) goods train tank locomotive with the Deutsche Reichsbahn-Gesellschaft. It was intended for duties on branch lines and was delivered by almost all the locomotive building firms working for the Reichsbahn. From 1942 it was built in a simplified version as a 'transitional war locomotive' (Übergangskriegslokomotive or ÜK). The most obvious changes were the omission of the second side windows in the cab and the solid disc carrying wheels.

== History ==
Almost all German locomotive factories took part in building these engines, 775 examples being produced in the period from 1928 to 1943. Its area of operations was predominantly the routes in Germany's Central Uplands (Mittelgebirge); as a result the first 10 units were given a Riggenbach counter-pressure brake. Twenty locomotives were destroyed during the Second World War; lightly damaged engines were repaired. Of the original 775 units, 175 went to the GDR railways, 385 to the Deutsche Bundesbahn, 29 to the Austrian Federal Railways (ÖBB), 44 to the PKP in Poland as the Class TKt3, 73 to the SZD and 62 to the CSD (6 of which later went to the SZD and 86 043 in 1958 to the GDR). On the last-mentioned 62 engines 28 became the CSD Class 455.2. Only 2 engines are still unaccounted for (86 016 and 86 469). The ÖBB began to retire them as early as 1945, but the last did not retire until 1972. However the Austrian engines had some of the most spectacular duties, including working double-headed on heavy, empty, ore trains with a DRB Class 52.

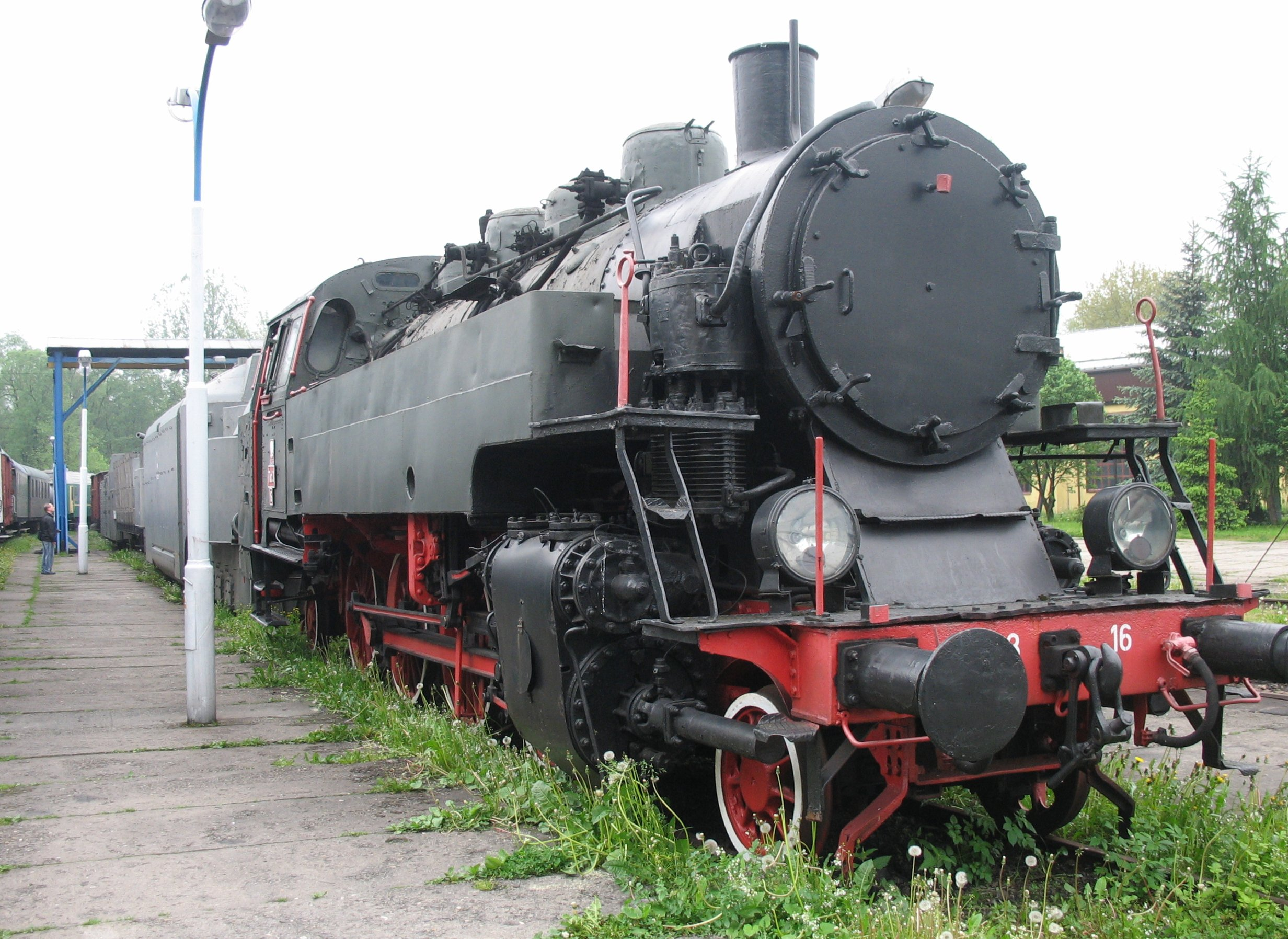
TKt3-16

The Bundesbahn stationed most of its 86's in Nuremberg for the Franconian branch lines and the marshalling yards there. The locomotive shed at Hof, Germany, was also renowned Class 86 territory. Short, semi-fast trains were also regularly hauled by the Class 86. The DB retired its last one in 1974.

In the GDR railways the 86's were mainly stationed at Aue engine shed (with over 50 engines) for the surrounding Ore Mountain routes. Some DR engines stationed at Heringsdorf shed on the island of Usedom were even given smoke deflectors. One well-known service was a fast-stopping train with 7 Bghw coaches, but light express trains were also on their schedule in the Central Uplands. The Class 86's last (official) year in service in the DR was 1976, but several engines continued to run on into the 1980s. Since its inauguration in 1928, no. 86 001/86 1001 was under steam almost every day, but in its latter years was often just used as a heating engine. Its last duties were on the stub line from Schlettau to Crottendorf, where it ended its steam services in 1988. Together with 86 501 this loco was once again taken into scheduled service for a week in 1989 to celebrate the centenary of the route. With a service age of 60 years, it became the longest serving of all the standard locomotives to be placed in scheduled service by a national railway. Since 1999, no. 86 001 has been mothballed. No. 86 1056 met a tragic end in 1989 when she was the last victim of the GDR's scrapping madness and was converted into a mobile steam dispenser. Its driving gear and cylinders went into the furnace.

== Preserved locomotives ==
Preserved engines include the 86 001 (Chemnitz), the oldest machine of its class, 86 049 (VSE Schwarzenberg), 86 056 (ÖGEG), 86 333, 86 457, 86 501 (ÖGEG), 86 607 (VMD loan to Adorf, a ÜK variant) and 86 744 of the GDR. 86 056 and 86 501 (both GDR) were sold to Austria. Preserved DB engines include the 86 457 at the DB Museum, which was badly damaged in the fire at the Nuremberg 1 locomotive shed (the museums depot of the Nuremberg Transport Museum). In all over 12 locomotives remain (excluding memorial ones), of which 9 are in Germany.

In Poland no. 86 240 remains as no. Tkt3-16. No. 86 348 is being refurbished by the GES, but stood formerly as a monument in Breuningerland in Ludwigsburg/Tamm.

== See also ==
- List of DRG locomotives and railbuses
