= Bavarian G 5/5 =

Bavarian G 5/5 DRG Class 57.5
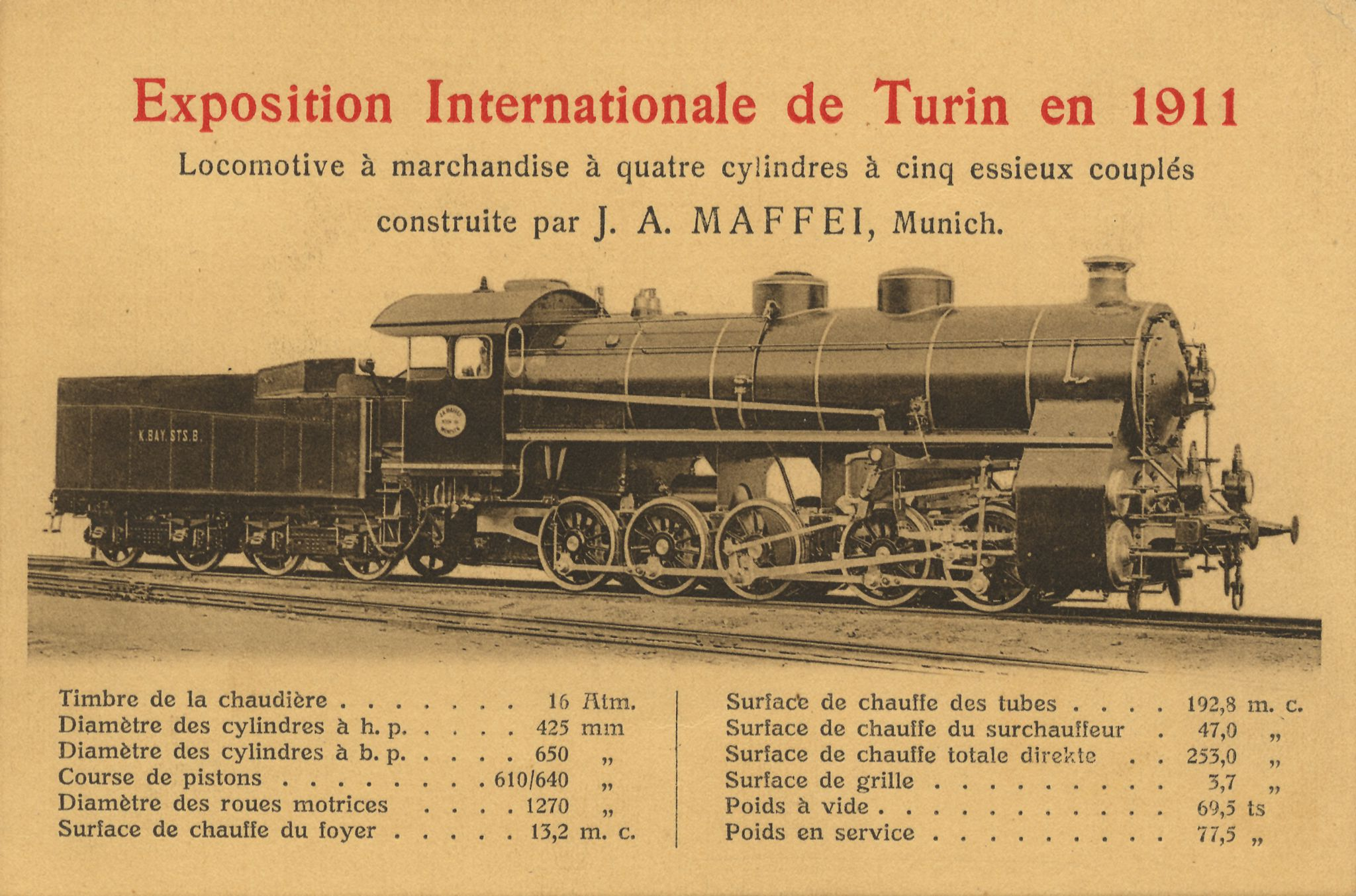
Type and origin
- Builder: Maffei
- Build date: 1911–1924
- Total produced: 95
Specifications
- Configuration
  - Whyte: 0-10-0
  - German: G55.15, G55.16, G55.17
- Gauge: 1,435 mm (4 ft 8 1/2 in)
- Driver dia.: 1,270 mm (4 ft 2 in)
- Length
  - Over beams: 19,974 mm (65 ft 6 1/2 in)
- Axle load: 15.7–16.9 t (15.5–16.6 long tons; 17.3–18.6 short tons)
- Adhesive weight: 80.2–84.4 t (78.9–83.1 long tons; 88.4–93.0 short tons)
- Service weight: 80.2–84.4 t (78.9–83.1 long tons; 88.4–93.0 short tons)
- Boiler pressure: 16 kgf/cm^{2} (1.57 MPa; 228 lbf/in^{2})
- Heating surface
  - Firebox: 3.70 m^{2} (39.8 sq ft)
  - Evaporative: 206.04 m^{2} (2,217.8 sq ft)
- Superheater
  - Heating area: 47.00 m^{2} (505.9 sq ft)
- Cylinders: Four (compound)
- High-pressure cylinder: 425 mm (16 3/4 in)
- Low-pressure cylinder: 650 mm (25 9/16 in)
- Piston stroke: 610 and 640 mm (24 and 25 3/16 in)
Performance figures
- Maximum speed: 60 km/h (37 mph)
- Indicated power: 1,650 PS (1,210 kW; 1,630 hp)
Career
- Numbers: Bavaria 5801-5815, Bavaria 5816-5895; DRG 57 501–507, DRG 57 511–590
- Retired: up to 1953

The Bavarian G 5/5 goods train, steam locomotives were intended for steep stretches of line belonging to the Royal Bavarian State Railways (Königlich Bayerische Staatsbahn) network in northern Bavaria. The extremely sharp rise in the levels of traffic on these lines in the years leading up to the First World War meant that the eight-coupled Bavarian E I and G 4/5 N classes previously employed there were increasingly unable to cope.

The first 15 examples were built in 1911 by Maffei. The G 5/5 was the first Bavarian goods train locomotive to be built with a superheater and four-cylinder compound engine. It acquitted itself well in practice and achieved very good consumption figures. As a result, a further 80, more powerful, engines were procured from 1920 to 1924.

The Bavarian G 5/5 was the most powerful, ten-coupled locomotive of all the German state railways (Länderbahnen). In this respect it was far superior to the Prussian G 10 and even the Prussian G 12 was unable to match it.

Of the first series, the seven remaining examples left after the First World War and the associated reparations were taken over by the Deutsche Reichsbahn, being renumbered as 57 501–507. The 80 engines from the follow-on order went straight into the Bavarian Group Administration of the Reichsbahn and were later allocated operating numbers 57 511–590.

In 1930, as a consequence of the worldwide economic crisis, former Länderbahn freight locomotives were increasingly retired even if they had not reached their full service life. In addition to antiquated Prussian classes such as the G 4 and G 5, large numbers of clearly much newer locomotives of south German manufacture were withdrawn. How much the "Berlin veto" (Bannstrahl) of the Reichsbahn's Chief Mechanical Engineer, Richard Paul Wagner, was responsible, is difficult to say at this distance, but it was very probably a major factor.

In addition to the 57.5, this also affected the Bavarian 56.8, as well as ex-Baden (e.g. the Baden VIII e), ex-Württemberg (e.g. the Württemberg H and Hh) and ex-Saxon (e.g. the Saxon XI V, XI H and XI HV).

Increasing electrification of the south German railway network and the low numbers of some engine classes also played their part. Transferring the complex and demanding south German machines to depots in the north was out of the question, despite their relative newness. In addition, enough new or relatively new Prussian locomotives were already available there.

At the end of the Second World War 20 vehicles remained in service. Most of them were retired by 1947 with war damage; some survived in the Deutsche Bundesbahn until 1950 as a splinter group.

== See also ==
- Royal Bavarian State Railways
- List of Bavarian locomotives and railbuses
