= Prussian T 10 =

Class of 12 4-6-0T locomotives

Prussian T 10 DRG Class 76
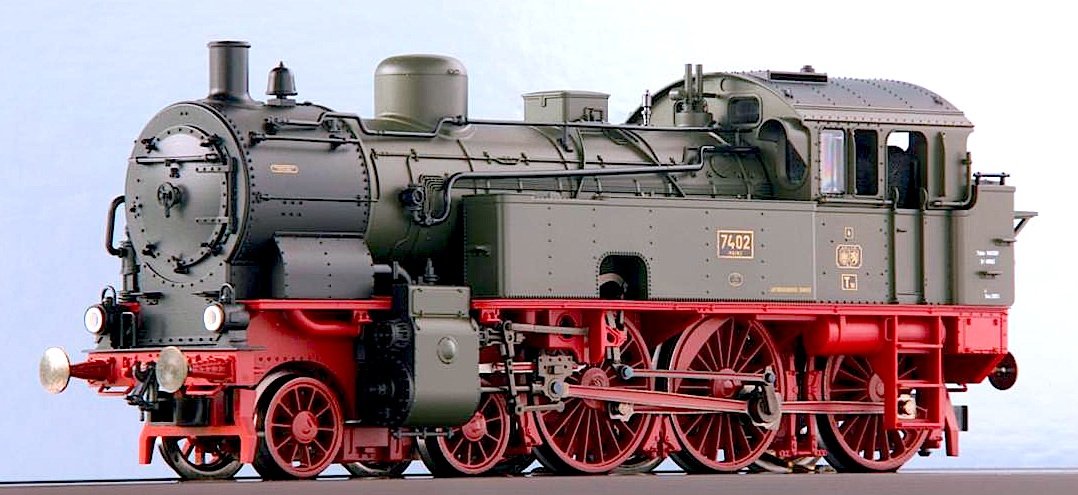
- Fleischmann model of Prussian P 10
Type and origin
- Builder: Borsig
- Build date: 1909–1911
- Total produced: 12
Specifications
- Configuration
  - Whyte: 4-6-0
- Gauge: 1,435 mm (4 ft 8 1/2 in)
- Leading dia.: 1,000 mm (3 ft 3 3/8 in)
- Driver dia.: 1,750 mm (5 ft 8 7/8 in)
- Length
  - Over beams: 11,800 mm (38 ft 8 1/2 in)
- Axle load: 16.3 tonnes (16.0 long tons; 18.0 short tons)
- Adhesive weight: 48.7 tonnes (47.9 long tons; 53.7 short tons)
- Service weight: 76.1 tonnes (74.9 long tons; 83.9 short tons)
- Boiler pressure: 12 bar (1.20 MPa; 174 psi)
- Heating surface
  - Firebox: 1.85 m^{2} (19.9 sq ft)
  - Evaporative: 134.33 m^{2} (1,445.9 sq ft)
- Superheater
  - Heating area: 39.20 m^{2} (421.9 sq ft)
- Cylinders: Two
- Cylinder size: 575 mm (22 5/8 in)
- Piston stroke: 630 mm (24 13/16 in)
Performance figures
- Maximum speed: 100 km/h (62 mph)
- Indicated power: 647 kW (880 PS; 868 hp)
Career
- Numbers: Mainz 7401–7412; DRG 76 001–011; OHE 76 091–096; Nord 3.1499 → 3.887; SNCF 1-230.TB.1
- Retired: SNCF: 1947; DB: 1949; OHE: 1965

The Prussian Class T 10s were tank locomotives operated by the Prussian state railways. They were procured for duties between Frankfurt and Wiesbaden between 1909 and 1912. This 41-kilometre (25 mi) long route between the two termini was to be worked without turning the locomotive. Because the engine tended to derail, in practice it was turned whenever possible. On these engines, supplied by Borsig, the boiler from the Prussian P 6 and the running gear and drive from the Prussian P 8 were used. The boiler had to be positioned further forward than was usual on other locomotives in order to even out the distribution of weight, because the design omitted any trailing wheels. The first trial runs took place on 30 June 1909.

The Reichsbahn took over 11 machines of this class as their DRG Class 76, the engines were given numbers 76 001–011. The other locomotive (7404) was given to the Chemins de fer du Nord under the terms of the Versailles Treaty. Eight engines were taken over by the Deutsche Bundesbahn. Between 1945 and 1948 they were either retired or sold to private railways. In 1964 there were still six units on duty with the East Hanoverian Railway (Osthannoversche Eisenbahnen; OHE).

No examples of the DRG Class 76 have been preserved.

== See also ==
- Prussian state railways
- List of Prussian locomotives and railcars
