= Class 18 =

Class 18 may refer to:

- A18-class container ship
- Belgian Railways Class 18 (Alsthom)
- Belgian Railways Class 18 (Siemens)
- British Rail Class 18
- Fenniarail Class Dr18
- GER Class T18
- New South Wales 18 class locomotive
- NSB Class 18
- The DRG Class 18 were German steam locomotives operated by the Deutsche Reichsbahn between the wars. These express tender locomotives had been taken over from the Länderbahnen state railways and had a 4-6-2 (Pacific) wheel arrangement.
  - Class 18.0: Saxon XVIII H
  - Class 18.1: Württemberg C
  - Class 18.2: Baden IV f
  - Class 18.2^{II}: DR 18 201 – rebuilt from DRG Class 61 tank locomotive
  - Class 18.3: Baden IV h
  - Class 18.4-5: Bavarian S 3/6
  - Class 18.6: PKP Class Pm36
  - Class 18.6^{II}: rebuild of Bavarian S 3/6 by DB (DB Class 18.6)
  - Class T 18.10: turbine locomotives

== See also ==
- DR 18 201
- Type 18 (disambiguation)
