= Class 38 =

Class 38 or 38 class may refer to:

- German passenger locomotives with a 4-6-0 wheel arrangement operated by the Deutsche Reichsbahn comprising:
  - Class 38.0: Bavarian P 3/5 N
  - Class 38.2-3: Saxon XII H2
  - Class 38.4: Bavarian P 3/5 H
  - Class 38.5: JDŽ 109
  - Class 38.10–40: Prussian P 8 (including Mecklenburg, Oldenburg, and Baden P 8s), Saarland P 8, PKP class Ok1, LG class K8, SNCF 1–230.F
  - Class 38.41: BBÖ 209, JDŽ 03
  - Class 38.42-44: ČSD Class 354.4
  - Class 38.45-46: PKP class Ok22
  - Class 38.70: Baden IV e
- New South Wales 38 class locomotive
