= Bavarian S 2/6 =

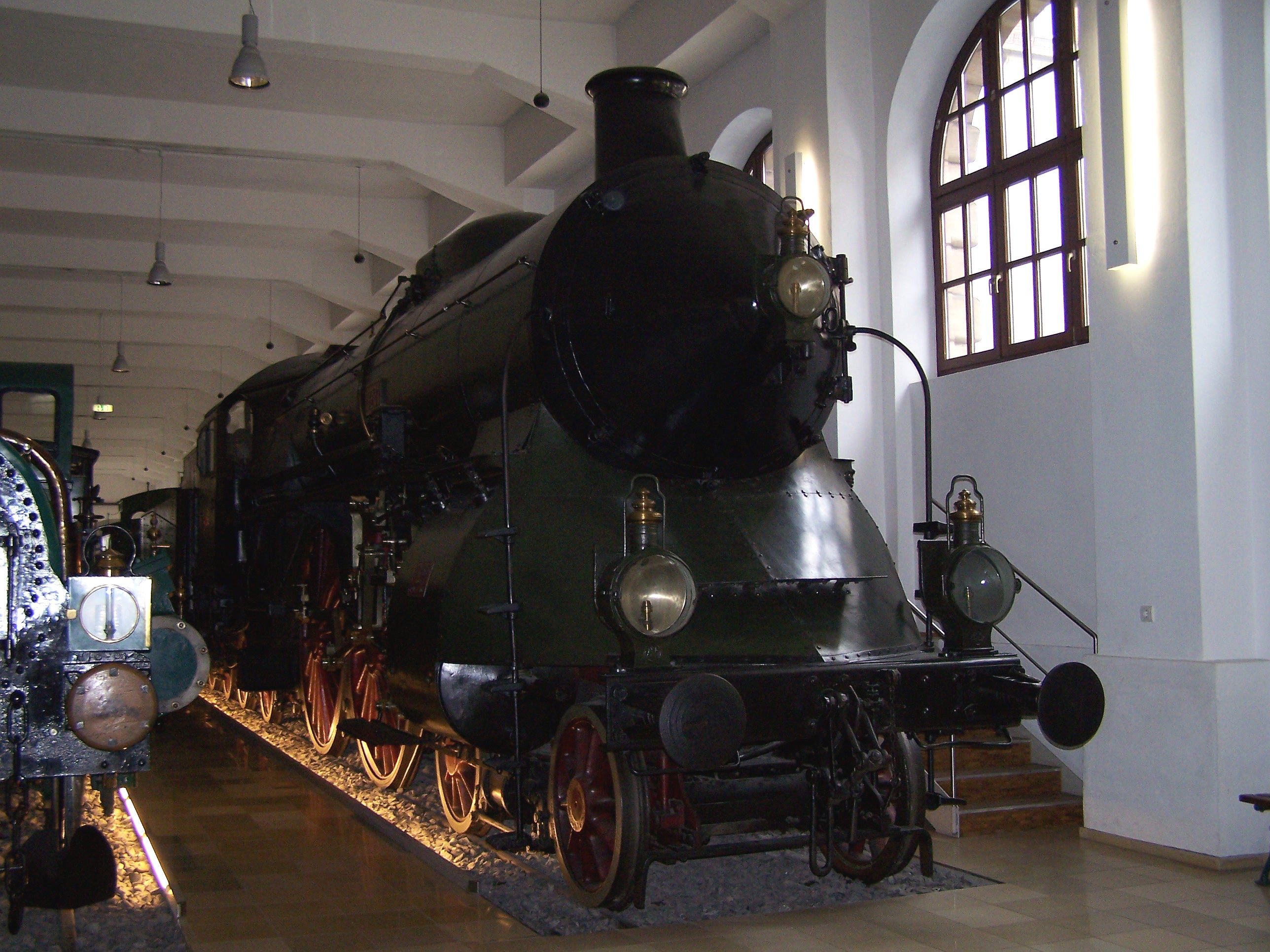
- Bavarian S 2/6 in the Nuremberg Transport Museum
Type and origin
- Builder: Maffei
- Build date: 1906
- Total produced: 1
Specifications
- Configuration
  - Whyte: 4-4-4
- Gauge: 1,435 mm (4 ft 8 1/2 in)
- Leading dia.: 1,006 mm (3 ft 3 5/8 in)
- Driver dia.: 2,200 mm (7 ft 2 5/8 in)
- Trailing dia.: 1,006 mm (3 ft 3 5/8 in)
- Length
  - Over beams: 21,182 mm (69 ft 6 in)
- Axle load: 16.0 t (15.7 long tons; 17.6 short tons)
- Adhesive weight: 32.0 t (31.5 long tons; 35.3 short tons)
- Service weight: 83.4 t (82.1 long tons; 91.9 short tons)
- Boiler pressure: 15 kgf/cm^{2} (1.47 MPa; 213 lbf/in^{2})
- Heating surface
  - Firebox: 4.71 m^{2} (50.7 sq ft)
  - Evaporative: 214.50 m^{2} (2,308.9 sq ft)
- Superheater
  - Heating area: 38.00 m^{2} (409.0 sq ft)
- Cylinders: 4 (von Borries compound, 2×HP, 2×LP
- High-pressure cylinder: 410 mm (16 1/8 in)
- Low-pressure cylinder: 610 mm (24 in)
- Piston stroke: 640 mm (25 3/16 in)
Performance figures
- Maximum speed: 154.5 km/h (96 mph)
- Indicated power: ≈2,200 PS (1,620 kW; 2,170 hp)
Career
- Numbers: K.Bay.Sts.E.: 3201
- Retired: 1925
- Restored 1925 by Maffei, current owner: Nuremberg Transport Museum

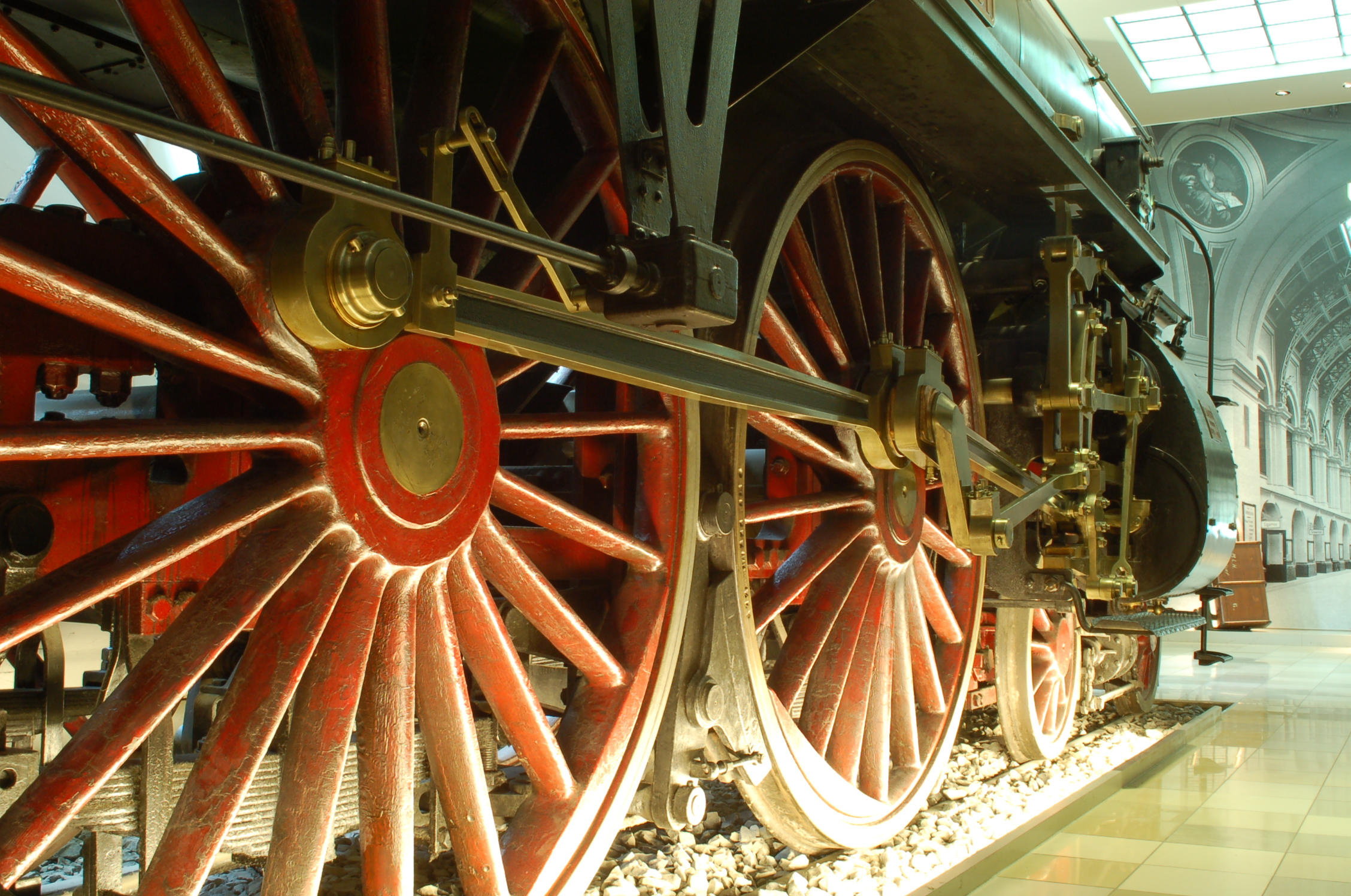
Driving gear of the S 2/6

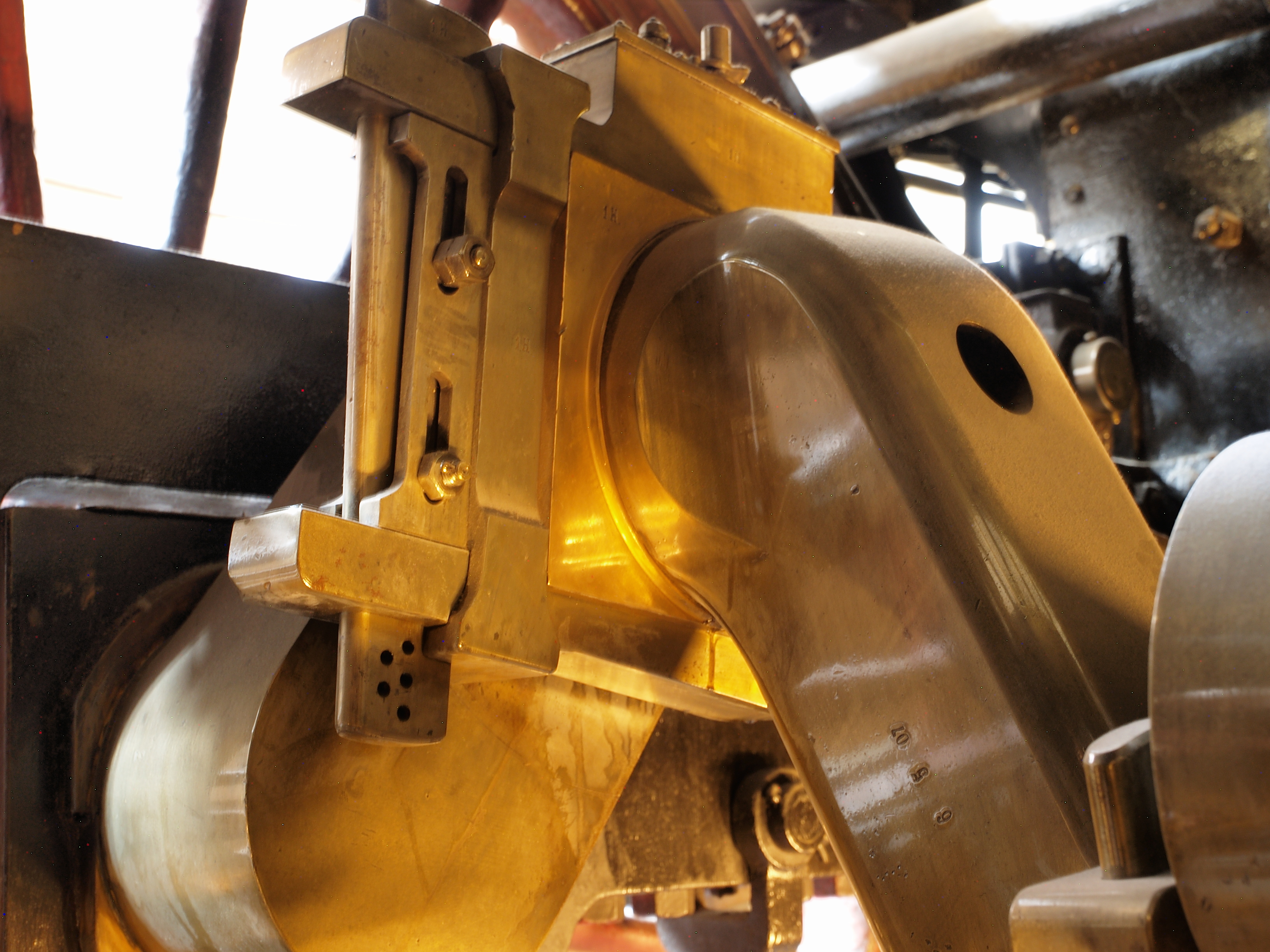
Crank axle of the S 2/6

The Royal Bavarian State Railways' sole class S 2/6 steam locomotive was built in 1906 by the firm of Maffei in Munich, Germany. It was of 4-4-4 wheel arrangement in the Whyte notation, or 2'B2' h4v in the UIC classification scheme, and was a 4-cylinder, von Borries, balanced compound locomotive. It was initially assigned No. 3201.

The inspiration was partly the two Prussian S 9 cab forward 4-4-4s of two years previously. Unlike those locomotives, the S 2/6 was strictly conventional in all respects apart from wheel arrangement, driving wheel size and streamlining. Many aspects of the design were borrowed from the earlier Maffei design of the Baden IId 4-4-2 class; Anton Hammel was the chief designer for both. The locomotive was designed and built in only 4 months.

== Design ==
This locomotive was the first time a cast steel locomotive frame modeled after American practice was used in Germany. This was lighter and more slender for the same degree of strength and contributed to the locomotive's slender, lightweight appearance.

While the locomotive was not covered by a streamlined shell, a degree of air-smoothing was applied, with a conical smokebox front, a smoothly curved plate covering the area beneath the smokebox down to the buffer beam and out to the cylinders, and streamlined fairings around the stack and steam dome. The front of the cab was faired into the boiler top and firebox sides in a smooth, streamlined curve.

A very large fire-grate area was provided, which gave the locomotive free-steaming qualities; its grate area was actually larger than many later express passenger locomotives. Only the Baden IV h 4-6-2 and DRG Class 45 2-10-2 locomotives ever had larger fireboxes in Germany; even the record-breaking DRG Class 05 4-6-4s had fireboxes no larger than the S 2/6. This was partly because Bavarian coal was of lower quality than that available in Prussia and elsewhere. Large ashpans extended down on both sides of the locomotive, between the driving wheels and trailing truck, allowing for long runs before they needed to be emptied.

The S 2/6 was the first large Bavarian locomotive fitted with a superheater, and thus the one fitted was of cautiously small heating area. This was one of the few places in which the design could have been considered lacking.

== Speed record ==
Before entering regular service, the S 2/6 underwent a significant number of test runs, mostly between Munich and Nuremberg or Augsburg. On one Munich to Augsburg test run on July 2, 1907, the locomotive attained a speed of 154.5 km/h (96.0 mph) while hauling a train of four express passenger cars. This was a German record not matched for 29 years and only exceeded (briefly) by world record-holder 05 002. Professional estimates of the locomotive's power output were around 2,200 PS (2,170 hp; 1,618 kW) during this run.

== Operating history ==
After testing was complete, No. 3201 was assigned to the Munich No.1 locomotive shed. It did not distinguish itself in service, largely because its unique specification did not suit it to the duties of any other locomotive. However, it proved more efficient than the larger Bavarian S 3/6 4-6-2 "Pacifics", although obviously with a lesser hauling ability. Its riding and tracking qualities came in for some criticism; this may have been because the leading and trailing trucks were not equalised with the driving wheels.

In 1910, the locomotive was transferred to the Rhineland-Palatinate region, assigned to the Ludwigshafen locomotive depot. The locomotive found greater appreciation there, and was affectionately nicknamed the "Zeppelin". It was assigned the same duties as the Bavarian S 2/5 (4-4-2 "Atlantics") and the Palatine P 4, locomotives more its equal in hauling capacity and its lessers in terms of performance.

The locomotive returned to Bavaria in 1922, initially assigned to the Munich depot and, from 1923, to Augsburg.

== Retirement ==
The Deutsche Reichsbahn-Gesellschaft assigned the locomotive the classification of BR 15 in their 1925 renumbering and classification scheme. It did not bear this long; No. 3201 was removed from service later that year and returned to Maffei for restoration, during which it was restored to its original livery. Following this, it was exhibited at the Munich Transport Exhibition, following which it was placed in the Nuremberg Transport Museum, where it remains to this day. It is now displayed next to the Baden IX (IIa old) class locomotive Phoenix, while 05 001 has been relocated to the museum’s external shed across the street.

== See also ==
- Royal Bavarian State Railways
- List of Bavarian locomotives and railbuses
