= Bavarian S 2/5 (Vauclain) =

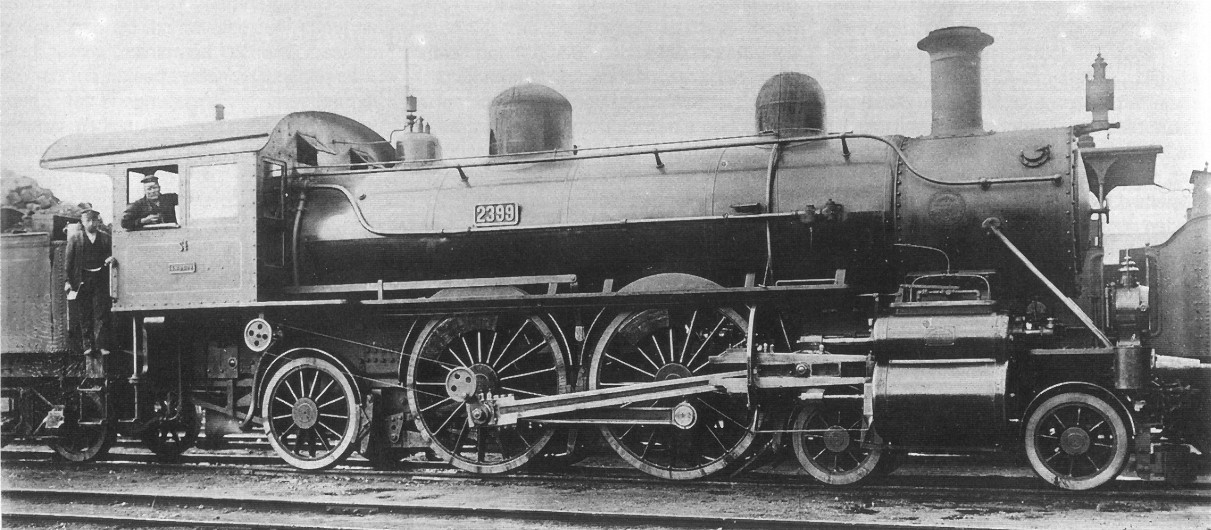
- Bavarian S 2/5 (Baldwin)
Type and origin
- Builder: Baldwin Locomotive Works
- Build date: 1900
- Total produced: 2
Specifications
- Configuration
  - Whyte: 4-4-2
- Gauge: 1,435 mm (4 ft 8 1/2 in)
- Leading dia.: 838 mm (2 ft 9 in)
- Driver dia.: 1,829 mm (6 ft 0 in)
- Trailing dia.: 1,219 mm (4 ft 0 in)
- Length
  - Over beams: 18,726 mm (61 ft 5 1/4 in)
- Axle load: 15.2 t (15.0 long tons; 16.8 short tons)
- Adhesive weight: 30.8 t (30.3 long tons; 34.0 short tons)
- Service weight: 62.8 t (61.8 long tons; 69.2 short tons)
- Boiler pressure: 14 kgf/cm^{2} (1.37 MPa; 199 psi)
- Heating surface
  - Firebox: 2.81 m^{2} (30.2 sq ft)
  - Evaporative: 185.70 m^{2} (1,998.9 sq ft)
- Cylinders: 4, Vauclain compound
- High-pressure cylinder: 559 mm (22 in)
- Low-pressure cylinder: 330 mm (13 in)
- Piston stroke: 660 mm (26 in)
Performance figures
- Maximum speed: 90 km/h (56 mph)
Career
- Numbers: K.Bay.Sts.E.: 2398 and 2399
- Retired: 1923

The Class S 2/5 locomotives operated by the Royal Bavarian State Railways (Königlich Bayerische Staats-Eisenbahnen) included two express train, steam locomotives of American origin which were fitted with Vauclain compound engines.

In order to understand the design fundamentals of American locomotives, which were not well known in Germany at the time, the Bavarian State Railway imported, in 1899 and 1900, four locomotives manufactured by the Baldwin Locomotive Works in the USA. Following the two Class E I, Consolidation, goods train locomotives delivered in 1899 with a 2-8-0 wheel arrangement, were two Atlantic 4-4-2 express train locomotives. These were typical American locomotives, with a boiler and running gear identical with those of the Class A-1 locomotives on the Milwaukee Road. Even the wheelbase on the two classes of locomotive was almost identical, albeit the driving wheels of the Bavarian locomotives, at 1,829 mm diameter, were smaller than those of the A2 (1,981 mm), so that they were about a ton lighter overall (at that time the usual axle loads in the USA were not significantly higher than in Europe).

The locomotives had a four-cylinder, Vauclain compound engine, whereby the high-pressure and low-pressure cylinders were located one directly above the other and worked on a common Pleuel connecting rod. The advantage of this design was that no internal gear was needed that would have been difficult to access and which would have needed expensive cranked axles.

Whilst this type of running gear did not catch on with the state railway or more generally within Europe, several advantages to the American sectional frame were identified, including better accessibility to an internally arranged running gear. As a result, this type of frame was also made use of on the batch of ten S 2/5 locomotives built by Maffei in 1904 as well as all later Bavarian four-cylinder compound locomotives. However, they differed from their American counterparts in that they were given inside cylinders and a cranked axle.

The two Baldwin locomotives remained in service until after World War I under running numbers 2398 and 2399. In the Deutsche Reichsbahn's provisional renumbering plan at the beginning of the 1920s, the two locomotives were still included, as numbers 14 131 and 14 132, but a little while later they were retired. Of note in this connection is that their American prototypes were still in service until the end of the 1930s, following their rebuild into a two-cylinder superheated configuration.

== See also ==
- Royal Bavarian State Railways
- List of Bavarian locomotives and railbuses

== Sources ==
- Reuter, Wilhelm (1993). Die Schönsten der Schiene - Die Geschichte der Atlantic. Transpress Verlag. ISBN 3-613-01512-9.
