= Bavarian P 3/5 N =

Bavarian P 3/5 N DRG Class 38.0
Type and origin
- Builder: Maffei
- Build date: 1905–1907
- Total produced: 36
Specifications
- Configuration
  - Whyte: 4-6-0
- Gauge: 1,435 mm (4 ft 8 1/2 in)
- Leading dia.: 850 mm (2 ft 9 1/2 in)
- Driver dia.: 1,640 mm (5 ft 4 5/8 in)
- Length
  - Over beams: 18,524 mm (60 ft 9 1/4 in)
- Axle load: 15.3 t (15.1 long tons; 16.9 short tons)
- Adhesive weight: 45.2 t (44.5 long tons; 49.8 short tons)
- Service weight: 68.8 t (67.7 long tons; 75.8 short tons)
- Water cap.: 18.2 m^{3} (4,000 imp gal; 4,800 US gal)
- Boiler pressure: 15 kgf/cm^{2} (1.47 MPa; 213 lbf/in^{2})
- Heating surface
  - Firebox: 2.60 m^{2} (28.0 sq ft)
  - Evaporative: 165.50 m^{2} (1,781.4 sq ft)
- Cylinders: 4, compound
- High-pressure cylinder: 340 mm (13 3/8 in)
- Low-pressure cylinder: 570 mm (22 7/16 in)
- Piston stroke: 640 mm (25 3/16 in)
Performance figures
- Maximum speed: 90 km/h (56 mph)
Career
- Numbers: K.Bay.Sts.E.: 3801–3836; DRG 38 001 – 38 013
- Retired: 1938

The 36 locomotives of Class P 3/5 N of the Royal Bavarian State Railways (Königlich Bayerische Staatsbahn) were built between 1905 and 1907 by Maffei. The P 3/5 N evolved from the S 3/5 express train locomotive and had likewise a four-cylinder compound configuration. Compared with the S 3/5 the P 3/5 N had a smaller boiler but the same size cylinders. The P 3/5 N could haul a 350-ton train at 80 km/h on the level.

Six locomotives were destroyed in World War I; 17 more had to be handed over as reparations. The remaining 13 locomotives were taken over by the Deutsche Reichsbahn as Class 38.0.

The S 3/6 had already displaced these locomotives from the higher value passenger services.

Following positive experience with the Class P 3/5 H, the later DRG Class 38.4, in 1921, all P 3/5 N were converted from saturated to superheated steam operation between 1924 and 1925. The vehicles were nevertheless retired between 1932 and; the last locomotive in service was the 38 003.

The engines were equipped with Bavarian 2′2′ T 18,2 tenders.

== See also ==
- Royal Bavarian State Railways
- List of Bavarian locomotives and railbuses
