= Bavarian E I =

The Bavarian Class E I steam locomotives operated by the Royal Bavarian State Railways encompassed four different variants of saturated steam, goods train locomotive with a 2-8-0 wheel arrangement.

== Standard variant, older type ==
Bavarian E I Standard variant, older type
Type and origin
- Builder: Krauss
- Build date: 1894–1896
- Total produced: 12
Specifications
- Configuration
  - Whyte: 2-8-0
- Gauge: 1,435 mm (4 ft 8 1/2 in)
- Leading dia.: 1,006 mm (3 ft 3 5/8 in)
- Driver dia.: 1,170 mm (3 ft 10 1/8 in)
- Wheelbase
  - incl. tender: 12,750 mm (41 ft 10 in)
- Length
  - Over beams: 16,800 mm (55 ft 1 1/2 in)
- Axle load: 13.5 t (13.3 long tons; 14.9 short tons) (centre)
- Adhesive weight: 54.0 t (53.1 long tons; 59.5 short tons)
- Service weight: 64.4 t (63.4 long tons; 71.0 short tons)
- Tender weight: 32.8 t (32.3 long tons; 36.2 short tons)
- Tender type: bay 3 T 12.3
- Fuel capacity: 5,500 kg (12,100 lb) coal
- Water cap.: 12.3 m^{3} (2,700 imp gal; 3,200 US gal)
- Boiler pressure: 12 kgf/cm^{2} (1,180 kPa; 171 lbf/in^{2})
- Heating surface
  - Firebox: 2.43 m^{2} (26.2 sq ft)
  - Evaporative: 159.8 m^{2} (1,720 sq ft)
- Cylinders: 2
- Cylinder size: 540 mm (21 1/4 in)
- Piston stroke: 560 mm (22 1/16 in)
- Valve gear: Walschaerts (Heusinger), outside
Performance figures
- Maximum speed: 50 km/h (31 mph)
Career
- Numbers: K.Bay.Sts.E.: 2051–2062; État 140-901 to 140-903
- Retired: 1924

The first series of E I's was built by Krauss in 12 examples. The cylinders were positioned in front of the carrying axle and drove the first coupled axle. The carrying and driving axles were linked together in a Krauss-Helmholtz bogie. In addition the outside Walschaerts (Heusinger) valve gear had very short connecting rods on the engines delivered to Bavaria.

The vehicles were coupled with Bavarian Class bay 2'2' T 18 tenders. Later they were equipped with Class 3 T 12.3 tenders from the Bavarian B XI's.

== Sondermann Variant ==
Bavarian E I Sondermann variant
Type and origin
- Builder: Krauss
- Build date: 1896–1897
- Total produced: 2
Specifications
- Configuration
  - Whyte: 2-8-0
  - UIC: 1′D n4v
- Gauge: 1,435 mm (4 ft 8 1/2 in)
- Tender weight: 32.8 t (32.3 long tons; 36.2 short tons)
- Tender type: bay 3 T 12.3
- Fuel capacity: 5,500 kg (12,100 lb) coal
- Water cap.: 12.3 m^{3} (2,700 imp gal; 3,200 US gal)
- Boiler pressure: 13.5 kgf/cm^{2} (1.32 MPa; 192 lbf/in^{2})
- Cylinders: 4 (compound)
- High-pressure cylinder: 370 mm (14 9/16 in)
- Low-pressure cylinder: 710 mm (27 15/16 in)
- Piston stroke: 560 mm (22 1/16 in)
Career
- Numbers: K.Bay.Sts.E.: 2063–2064
- Retired: 1924
- certain technical data as for the newer standard variant; slightly differing weights

The second E I series delivered to the Royal Bavarian State Railways was the Sondermann Variant built from 1896. It had two overlapping cylinders that formed a combined double slide valve (Doppelschieber). The carrying axle and the first driving axle were housed in a Krauss-Helmholtz bogie. The advantage of this locomotive variant was that the double cylinder was very short as a result of the tandem construction. Nevertheless, the engine did not perform especially well, so that the two units were converted into locomotives with a conventional cylinder arrangement.

== Standard variant, newer type ==
Bavarian E I Standard variant, newer type
Type and origin
- Builder: Krauss
- Build date: 1899–1901
- Total produced: 48
Specifications
- Configuration
  - Whyte: 2-8-0
  - UIC: 1′D n2
- Gauge: 1,435 mm (4 ft 8 1/2 in)
- Leading dia.: 1,006 mm (3 ft 3 5/8 in)
- Driver dia.: 1,170 mm (3 ft 10 1/8 in)
- Wheelbase
  - incl. tender: 15,425 mm (50 ft 7 1/4 in)^{1}
- Length
  - Over beams: 18,202 mm (59 ft 8 1/2 in)^{1}
- Axle load: 13.6 t (13.4 long tons; 15.0 short tons) (centre)
- Adhesive weight: 54.5 t (53.6 long tons; 60.1 short tons)
- Service weight: 64.5 t (63.5 long tons; 71.1 short tons)
- Tender weight: 34.9 / 36.3 / 43.0 t
- Tender type: bay 3 T 13.8 or; bay 3 T 14 or; bay 2'2' T 18
- Fuel capacity: 5.5 / 6.0 / 6.5 t coal
- Water cap.: 13.8 / 14.0 / 18.0 m^{3}
- Boiler pressure: 12 kgf/cm^{2} (1,180 kPa; 171 lbf/in^{2})
- Heating surface
  - Firebox: 2.43 m^{2} (26.2 sq ft)
  - Evaporative: 159.8 m^{2} (1,720 sq ft)
- Cylinders: 2
- Cylinder size: 540 mm (21 1/4 in)
- Piston stroke: 560 mm (22 1/16 in)
- Valve gear: Walschaerts (Heusinger), outside
Performance figures
- Maximum speed: 60 km/h (37 mph)
Career
- Numbers: K.Bay.Sts.E.: 2065–2099, 2116–2130; État: 140-904 to 140-905, 140-907; État-Belge: 7374–7375; PKP: Tr101-1
- Retired: 1923–1925
- ^{1} with bay 2'2' T 18 tender

The third series of the E I locomotive was the final version of this particular class. A total of 48 vehicles were made and 42 were taken over by the Reichsbahn with the numbers 56 312 - 56 353. It was the same as the Sondermann variant after the conversion of the latter. These locomotives could haul a train of 820 tons at a speed of 50 km/h and even attained a speed of 40 km/h with a 1,390 ton train. On a line with a 0.5% incline they could manage an 845-ton train at 25 km/h.

== Vauclain Variant ==
Bavarian E I (Vauclain)
Type and origin
- Builder: Baldwin
- Build date: 1899
- Total produced: 2
Specifications
- Configuration
  - Whyte: 2-8-0
  - UIC: 1′D n4v
- Leading dia.: 914 mm (3 ft 0 in)
- Driver dia.: 1,270 mm (4 ft 2 in)
- Length
  - Over beams: 18,501 mm (60 ft 8 1/2 in)
- Axle load: 13.6 t (13.4 long tons; 15.0 short tons) (centre)
- Adhesive weight: 54.4 t (53.5 long tons; 60.0 short tons)
- Service weight: 62.6 t (61.6 long tons; 69.0 short tons)
- Tender weight: 44.0 t (43.3 long tons; 48.5 short tons)
- Tender type: bay 2'2' T 18.1
- Fuel capacity: 6,500 kg (14,300 lb) coal
- Water cap.: 18.1 m^{3} (4,000 imp gal; 4,800 US gal)
- Boiler pressure: 14 kgf/cm^{2} (1.37 MPa; 199 lbf/in^{2})
- Heating surface
  - Firebox: 3.08 m^{2} (33.2 sq ft)
  - Evaporative: 177.50 m^{2} (1,910.6 sq ft)
- Cylinders: 4 (compound)
- High-pressure cylinder: 356 mm (14 in)
- Low-pressure cylinder: 610 mm (24 in)
- Piston stroke: 660 mm (26 in)
- Valve gear: Stephenson, inside
Performance figures
- Maximum speed: 50 km/h (31 mph)
Career
- Numbers: K.Bay.Sts.E.: 2085–2086; État: 140-906
- Retired: 1917-1919

The Class E I locomotives built for the Royal Bavarian State Railways by the Baldwin were goods train steam locomotives imported from the United States for testing purposes.

The two machines were the first in Germany to have a bar frame, which had been standard in the USA virtually from the beginning and which had been developed from the wooden beam frames of the early locomotives.

Like the two S 2/5 express train locomotives also imported from Baldwin a year later these engines were equipped with a four-cylinder Vauclain compound engine, on which the high-pressure and low-pressure cylinders were located directly one above the other and worked on the same connecting rods. Apart from the bar frame, this type of drive did not catch on in Bavaria.

The locomotives were equipped with Bavarian 2'2' T 18,1 tenders.

== See also ==
- Royal Bavarian State Railways
- List of Bavarian locomotives and railbuses

== Sources ==
- Merkbuch für die Fahrzeuge der Reichsbahn. I. Dampflokomotiven und Tender (Regelspur). Ausgabe 1924. Berlin: Eisenbahn-Zentralamt Berlin. 1924.
- Scheingraber, Günther (1975). Die Königlich Bayerischen Staatseisenbahnen. Stuttgart: Franckh. ISBN 3-440-04233-2.
- Vandenberghen, J. (1989). La guerre 1914 - 1918 et les locomotives "Armistice", 3. Description des locomotives bavaroises, saxonnes, badoises, mecklebourgeoises, oldenbourgeoises (PDF) (in French). Brussels: SNCB. p. 28.
- v. Welser, Ludwig (1996). Bayern-Report Band No. 6. Fürstenfeldbruck: Merker. ISBN 3-922404-94-4.
