= Type 18 =

Type 18 may refer to:

- Bristol Type 18 Scout E, a British single seat biplane fighter built in 1916
- Volkswagen Type 18A, a German automobile specially made for the German police
- Bugatti Type 18, also called the Garros, a Bugatti car
- Murata Rifle (Murata Typ 18), a weapon of the Imperial Japanese Army
- Type 18, a Japanese 53 cm torpedo

== See also ==
- Class 18 (disambiguation)
