= Baden IV h =

Class of 20 German 4-6-2 locomotives

IV h DR Class 18^{3}
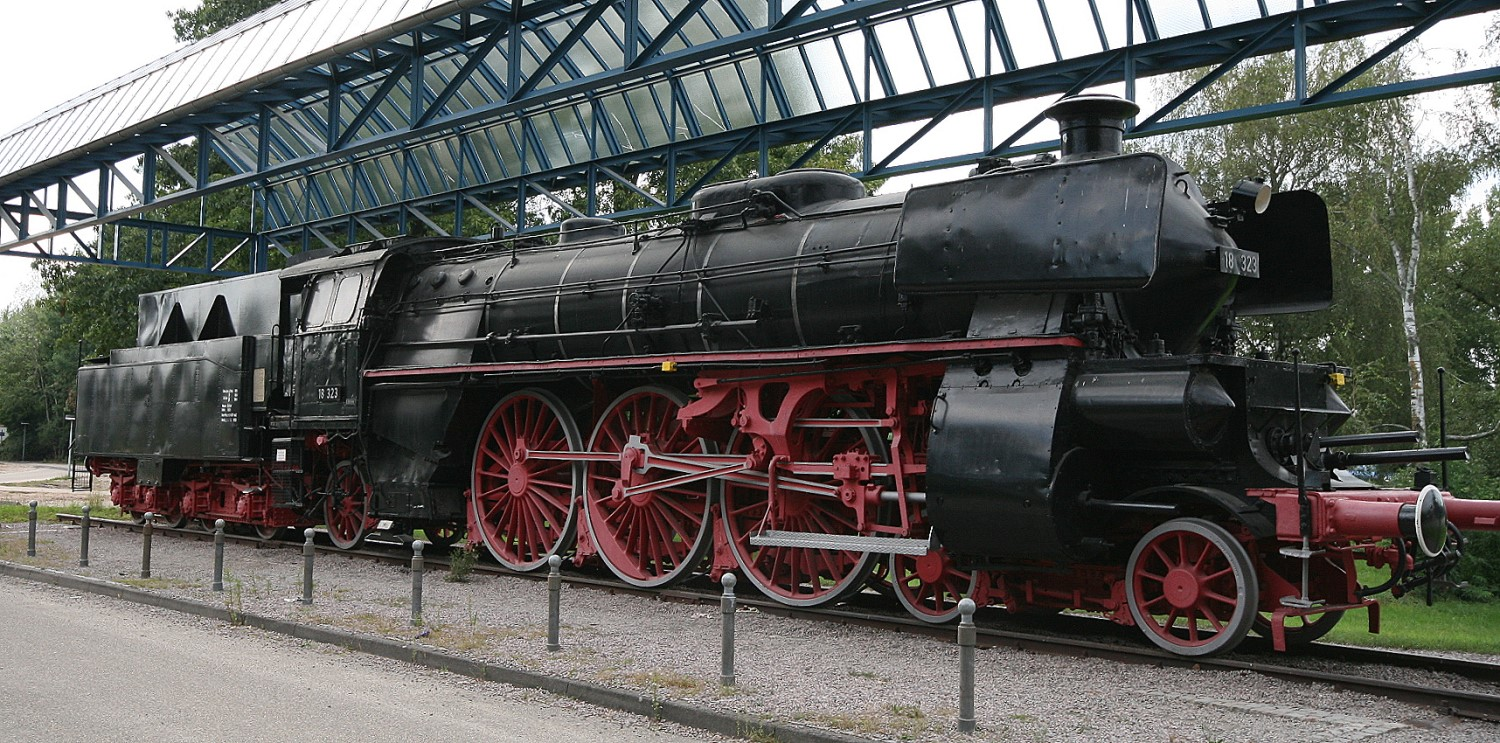
- 18 323 displayed at the University of Applied Sciences Offenburg
Type and origin
- Builder: Maffei, Munich
- Build date: 1918–1920
- Total produced: 20
Specifications
- Configuration
  - Whyte: 4-6-2
  - German: S 36.17
- Gauge: 1,435 mm (4 ft 8 1/2 in)
- Leading dia.: 990 mm (3 ft 3 in)
- Coupled dia.: 2,100 mm (6 ft 10 5/8 in)
- Trailing dia.: 1,200 mm (3 ft 11 1/4 in)
- Wheelbase
  - Bogie: 2,300 mm (7 ft 6 1/2 in)
  - Overall: 12,310 mm (40 ft 4 3/4 in)
  - incl. tender: 19,625 mm (64 ft 4 3/4 in)
- Length
  - Over beams: 23,230 mm (76 ft 2 1/2 in)
- Axle load: 17.80 t (17.52 long tons; 19.62 short tons)
- Adhesive weight: 53.40 t (52.56 long tons; 58.86 short tons)
- Empty weight: 87.50 t (86.12 long tons; 96.45 short tons)
- Service weight: 97.00 t (95.47 long tons; 106.92 short tons)
- Tender type: bad. 2′2 T29,6
- Fuel capacity: 9 t (8.9 long tons; 9.9 short tons) Coal
- Water cap.: 29.6 m^{3} (6,500 imp gal; 7,800 US gal)
- Boiler
- No. of heating tubes: 170
- No. of smoke tubes: 34
- Heating tube length: 5,200 mm (17 ft 3/4 in)
- Boiler pressure: 15 kg/cm^{2} (1.47 MPa; 213 psi)
- Heating surface
  - Firebox: 5.00 m^{2} (53.8 sq ft)
  - Radiative: 15.60 m^{2} (167.9 sq ft)
  - Tubes: 209.20 m^{2} (2,251.8 sq ft)
  - Evaporative: 224.8 m^{2} (2,420 sq ft)
- Superheater
  - Heating area: 77.60 m^{2} (835.3 sq ft)
- Cylinders: 4
- High-pressure cylinder: 440 mm (17 5/16 in)
- Low-pressure cylinder: 680 mm (26 3/4 in)
- Piston stroke: 680 mm (26 3/4 in)
- Valve gear: Walschaerts (Heusinger)
- Train heating: Steam
Performance figures
- Maximum speed: 162 km/h (101 mph)
- Indicated power: 1,950–2,200 PS (1,430–1,620 kW; 1,920–2,170 hp)
Career
- Numbers: G.Bad.St.E.: 49, 64, 95, 1000–1016; DRG: 18 301–303 18 311–319 18 321–328
- Retired: 1948–1974

The class IV h (four-h) locomotives of the Grand Duchy of Baden State Railway (German: Großherzoglich Badische Staatseisenbahnen, G.Bad.St.E.) were express locomotives with a 4-6-2 (Pacific) wheel arrangement. They later passed to the Deutsche Reichsbahn, who classified them as class 18^{3}.

== Construction features ==
The twenty class IV h locomotives built by Maffei for the Grand Duchy of Baden State Railway were intended to replace the class IV f locomotives, which were overburdened on the Rhine Valley railway line between Basel and Mannheim due to their driving wheels being too small.

Accordingly, the IV h with a drive wheel diameter of 2,100 mm (6 ft 10 5/8 in) was designed uncompromisingly as a flatland express train locomotive. Nevertheless, the IV h were initially only approved for 110 km/h (68 mph) for braking reasons.

The IV h has a four-cylinder compound engine with divided drive. In contrast to earlier Maffei designs, the inner cylinders are driven on the first coupled wheelset, while the outer cylinders act on the second coupled wheelset. The outer cylinders are not (as in the de Glehn design) directly in front of the drive wheels, but in the usual position above the bogie. In the interest of providing sufficiently long connecting rods, the inner cylinders are pushed forward by a full cylinder length and, with their piston rod protection tubes protruding forward, give the locomotives of the series an unmistakable appearance. The two-axle drive and careful construction made it possible to considerably improve the durability of the goiter shafts (Kropfwellen) made of chrome-nickel crucible steel and provided with Frémont recesses. As far as can be ascertained, the goiter shafts of all twenty locomotives have never been renewed and have thus achieved mileages of more than two million kilometres in some cases.

Also in contrast to the de Glehn type, the low-pressure cylinders were arranged on the outside, as they could no longer be accommodated within the frame due to their diameter. Because of the very strong 160 mm (6 1/4 in) thick crank webs of the cranked drive axle, the centre lines of the internal high-pressure cylinders were so close to each other that the cylinders had to be arranged slightly offset in height to achieve a sufficient diameter. This can also be seen from the outside on the piston rod protection tubes.

The valve gear of the locomotives was arranged in such a way that an external Walschaerts (Heusinger) valve gear controlled both the low-pressure and the high-pressure cylinder on the respective locomotive side. Low and high pressure valves were arranged one behind the other as tandem valves. Dispensing with a separate control linkage for the inner cylinder made the adjustment of the high-pressure slide very difficult.

The three-ring boiler was the largest locomotive boiler ever used in Germany. The steam dome and sandbox sat under a common panel on the first ring. However, the boiler reserve was low due to the insufficient water space and the scarce evaporation surface. Furthermore, as with the other southern German superheated steam locomotives, the superheater area was also small. It was only possible to reach steam temperatures of around 330 °C (626 °F). As a result, the water and coal consumption of the IV h was higher than that of the later standard locomotives (Einheitslokomotiven).

A bar frame with a thickness of 100 mm (3 15/16 in) was used as the locomotive frame. The pivot of the leading bogie was set back 110 mm (4 5/16 in) from the mid-point of the bogie wheelsets; it also received a total of 152 mm (6 in) of lateral play. The lateral play of the trailing wheel set, designed as an Adams axle, was set to 100 mm (3 15/16 in).

The tender design is also unusual. It had to be kept relatively short in order to keep the overall wheelbase sufficiently small for the existing 20-metre (65 ft 7 1/2 in) turntables. Only one bogie was installed; The two rear tender wheel sets were placed next to each other in the tender frame with a spacing of only 1,450 mm (4 ft 9 in).

Table of orders and numbers
Year	Quantity	Maffei serial nos.	G.Bad.St.E nos.	DRG nos.
1918	3	4627–4629	49, 64, 95	18 301–303
1919	9	5086–5094	1000–1008	18 311–319
1920	8	5107–5114	1009–1016	18 321–328

== Service ==
The locomotives were ordered in 1915 and were delivered in three series between 1918 and 1920; they were allocated to the locomotive depot (Bahnbetriebswerk, Bw) at Offenburg. They were used on the Rhine Valley route between Frankfurt and Basel, among other things, in powering the Rheingold. Due to the incomplete conversion of the Heidelberg terminus station to a through station, the planned service could not be implemented without changing locomotives. The locomotives could easily move a 650-tonne (640-long-ton; 720-short-ton) train on the level at 100 km/h (62 mph) and, with the same trailing load, still reached 70 km/h (43 mph) on an incline of 5.38 ‰ (0.538% or 1 in 186) – for comparison: the load table for the class 03 gave for one Express train on 5 ‰ (0.5% or 1 in 200) slope only 570 tonnes (560 long tons; 630 short tons) at 70 km/h (43 mph). According to Richard Paul Wagner, indicated outputs of up to 2,200 PS (1,620 kW; 2,170 hp) could be achieved with the locomotives.

When the last IV h were delivered in 1920, the Badische Staatsbahn had already merged into the Deutsche Reichsbahn. They took over all twenty locomotives as class 18.3 and gave the three series the fleet numbers 18 301–303, 311–319 and 321–328.

During their service with the Reichsbahn, the locomotives were very unpopular with all parties involved because of their unusual four-cylinder compound drive. The engine drivers couldn't cope with the complicated structure; the operations management saw problems with the combination of high and low pressure cylinders.

Towards the end of the 1920s, the locomotives in Baden were replaced by standard class 01 locomotives and used further north. In 1933 the first locomotives came to Koblenz, where they served as a reserve for the Rheingold and ran as scheduled on the Saarbrücken – Frankfurt route. From 1935, the IV h were to be found in Bremen; from there they were used on the north German lowland routes, for which they were well suited. Here staff got along better with the locomotives; and after some detail improvements, it became clear that the IV h was even superior to the class 03 locomotives that were 15 years younger. From 1942, all locomotives in the series were stationed in Bremen.

During testing in the 1930s, the 18 328 reached speeds of up to 155 km/h (96 mph), and its good running characteristics were noticeable. After installing stronger brakes and softer springs, the maximum permissible speed of the class was therefore increased to 140 km/h (87 mph).

The 18 326 was a victim of the World War II in 1944. The remaining 19 locomotives came to the Deutsche Bundesbahn after the war and were initially withdrawn in 1948 as a small class of non-standard locomotives.

=== Deutsche Bundesbahn ===
The Deutsche Bundesbahn also needed fast locomotives for test purposes. Since the newer standard locomotives were needed in operational service, it was decided to reactivate three of the already retired IV h. The choice fell on three locomotives: 18 316, 18 319 and 18 323

Like the 18 314 at the Deutsche Reichsbahn (see below), they received a counter-pressure brake for use as a brake locomotive (based on the Düring design), smoke deflectors based on the Witte pattern, a larger smokebox door, a modified sandbox and a Caledonian-style chimney cap. The tender was also modified.

The 18 319 was equipped with an extended smokebox, as the arrangement of the inlet pipes to the high pressure cylinders was changed.

The locomotives were assigned to the Federal Railway Research Office in Minden. In 1951, during a test run with a complete FD train, one of them set a distance record that is still unachieved for German steam locomotives: the 977 kilometres (607 miles) long route from Hamburg-Altona to Freilassing was covered by one locomotive without any maintenance. The highest speed on this trip was 125 km/h (78 mph). The locomotive only took in water and coal at the intermediate stops.

The 18 316 and 18 323 were not retired until 1969; they were the last four-cylinder compound locomotives of the Deutsche Bundesbahn. The two locomotives were preserved as monuments: the 18 316 came to an amusement park near Minden; the 18 323 was set up in front of the University of Applied Sciences Offenburg.

==== 18 316 ====
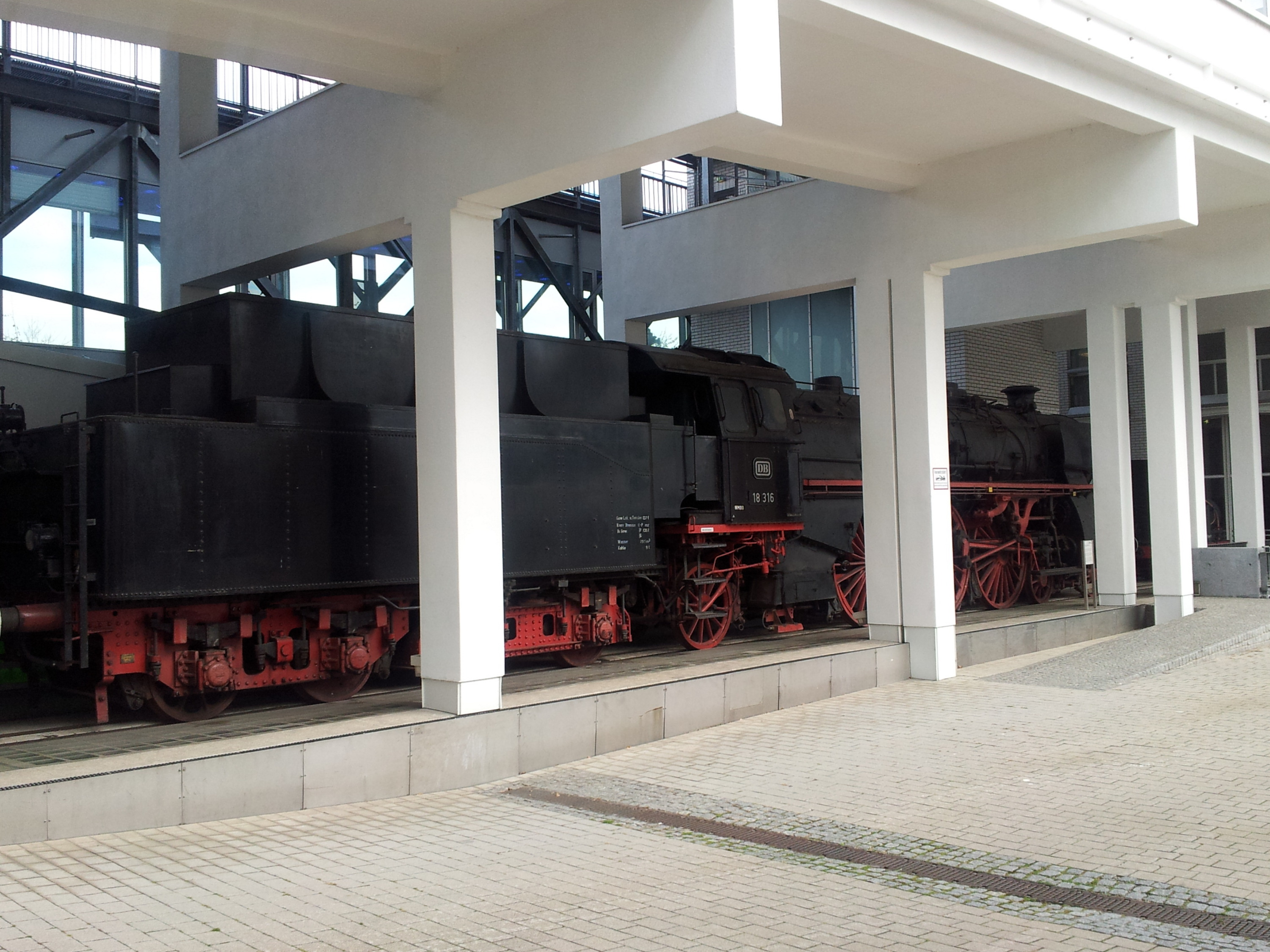
18 316 in the State Museum of Technology and Work in Mannheim

In 1956 the 18 316 reached a speed of 162 km/h (101 mph) when testing pantographs for electric traction vehicles on the Kufstein–Wörgl line. The Badische IV h turned out to be the fastest regional railway locomotive and even surpassed the Bavarian S 2/6.

The 18 316 was taken over by the State Museum for Technology and Work (LTA) in Mannheim in the early 1990s; and although it had been in the open for more than twenty years, it was possible to make it operational again. From 1995 until it was retired in April 2002, the 18 316 was one of only two operational express train locomotives from the Länderbahn era on numerous special trips; the other was the Bavarian S 3/6 No. 3673 (the erstwhile 18 478 of the Deutsche Reichsbahn). Unlike the 18 478, the 18 316 was not restored to its original condition.

After a damaged wheel, future outings of 18 316 are currently uncertain. After the locomotive was initially in the care of Historische Eisenbahn Mannheim e. V. in Friedrichsfeld, it was transferred to the State Museum on 24 April 2007.

=== Deutsche Reichsbahn ===
==== 18 314 ====
DR 18 314 from 1961
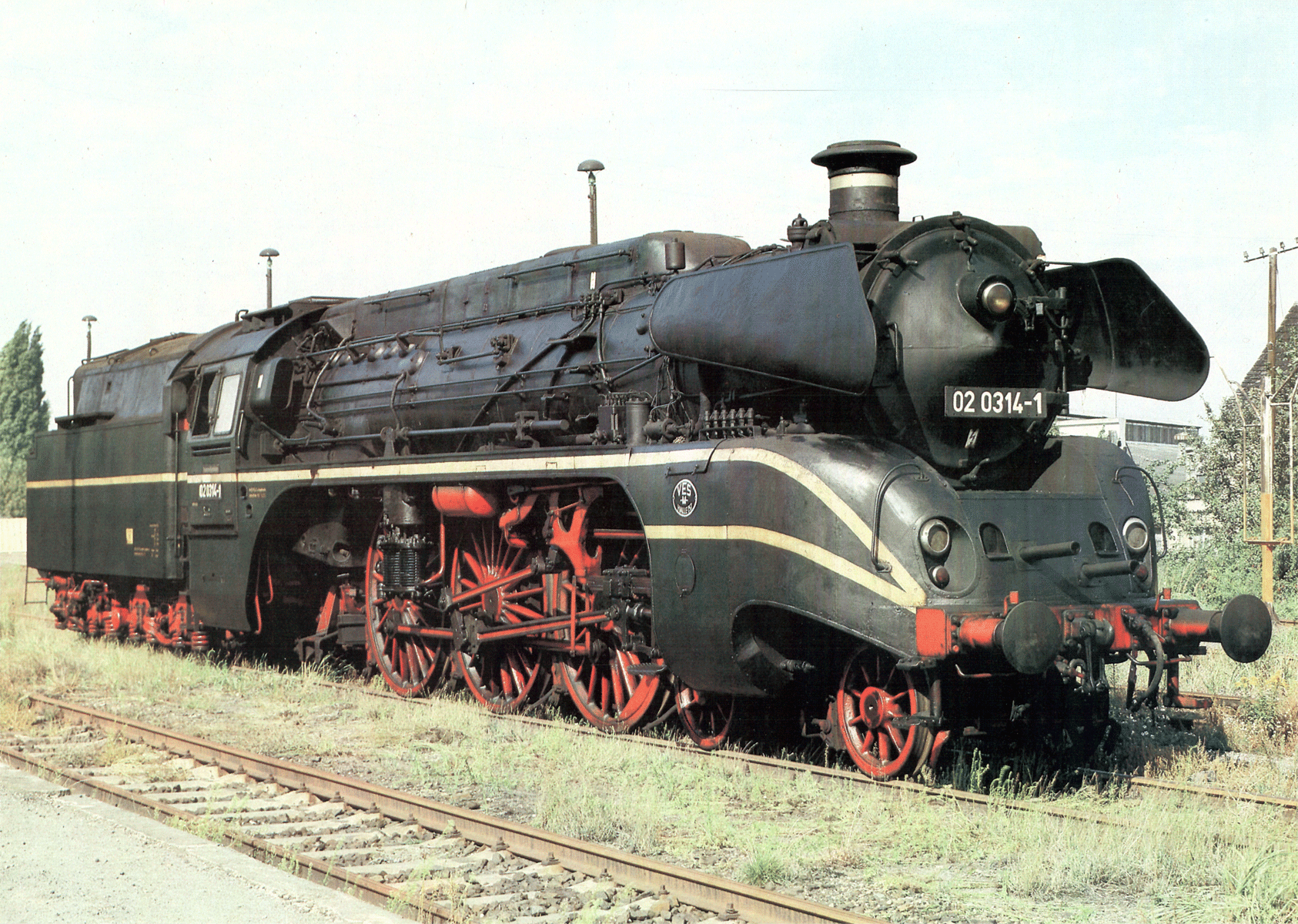
- Locomotive 02 0314-1 (ex 18 314) of Deutsche Reichsbahn
Specifications
- Configuration
  - UIC: S 36.19
- Length
  - Over beams: 23,630 mm (77 ft 6 1/4 in)
- Axle load: 19.0 t (18.7 long tons; 20.9 short tons)
- Adhesive weight: 56.9 t (56.0 long tons; 62.7 short tons)
- Empty weight: 95.0 t (93.5 long tons; 104.7 short tons)
- Service weight: 105.0 t (103.3 long tons; 115.7 short tons)
- Tender type: 2′2′ T34
- Fuel capacity: 13.5 m^{3} (3,000 imp gal; 3,600 US gal) Fuel oil
- Water cap.: 34 m^{3} (7,500 imp gal; 9,000 US gal)
- Boiler
- No. of heating tubes: 112
- No. of smoke tubes: 36
- Heating tube length: 5,480 mm (17 ft 11 3/4 in)
- Boiler pressure: 16 kg/cm^{2} (1.57 MPa; 228 psi)
- Heating surface
  - Firebox: 4.23 m^{2} (45.5 sq ft)
  - Radiative: 21.3 m^{2} (229 sq ft)
  - Tubes: 178.2 m^{2} (1,918 sq ft)
  - Evaporative: 199.50 m^{2} (2,147.4 sq ft)
- Superheater
  - Heating area: 80.00 m^{2} (861.1 sq ft)
- High-pressure cylinder: 440 mm (17 5/16 in)
- Low-pressure cylinder: 550 mm (21 5/8 in)
- Train heating: Steam
Performance figures
- Maximum speed: 150 km/h (93 mph)
- Indicated power: 1,950 PS (1,430 kW; 1,920 hp)
Career
- Numbers: 18 314; 02 0314-1

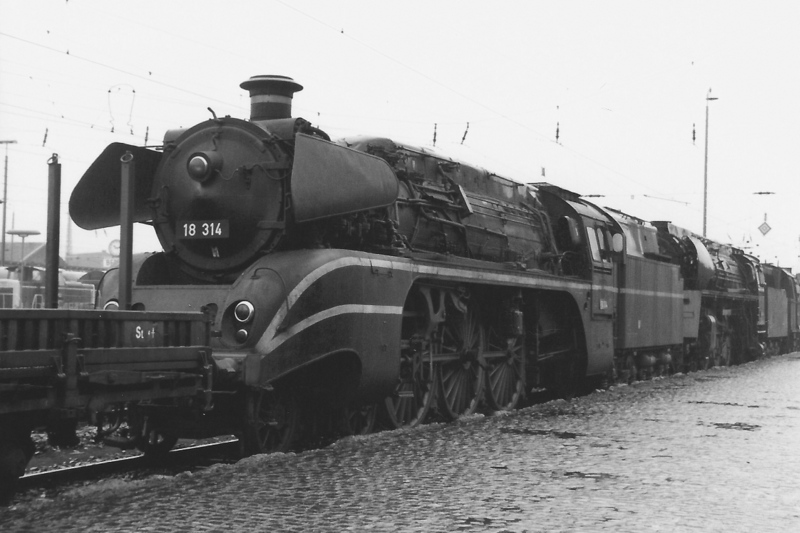
18 314 in Bf Bebra (1984)

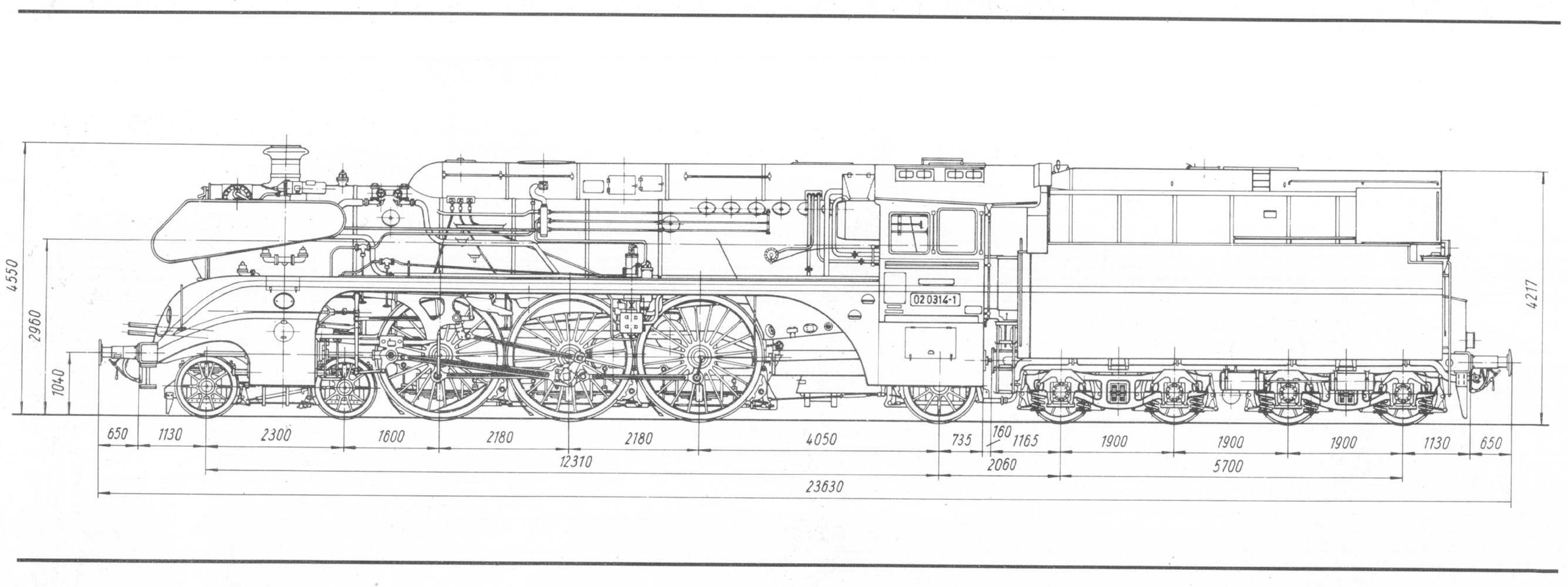
General arrangement drawing of locomotive 02 0314-1 (ex 18 314) of Deutsche Reichsbahn.

At the instigation of Max Baumberg in 1948, the 18 314 intended for retirement went to the Deutsche Reichsbahn in exchange for the 18 434 remaining in the east (a Bavarian S 3/6) and received a general inspection at the RAW Stendal. Until 1950 she was used for courier train services from the Bw Stendal. At this point in time, in 1951, she came to the newly established Halle Locomotive Research Institute (later VES-M Halle), of which Max Baumberg became the director. There she received the tender of 07 1001 (the former 2–231.E.18 of the SNCF, ex Nord 3.1188), as it was converted to coal dust firing. Fast-moving locomotives were needed to test express train passenger cars, so that in addition to the conversion of 61 002 into 18 201, the 18 314 was also used, as this – unlike the S 3/6 – was already approved for 140 km/h (87 mph) running.

Since high-speed locomotives were still necessary for test purposes, the locomotive was rebuilt in 1960 by the RAW "7 October" Zwickau rebuilt according to plans of the VES-M Halle, whereby it received a combustion chamber boiler of the type 39E, as it was also used for the conversion of the class 22, but with a slightly shortened boiler. This was necessary because the arrangement of the exhaust pipes meant that there was little space in the smokebox and the steam collecting box also had to be accommodated there. It also received a counter-pressure brake for use as a brake locomotive. As a result, the nontypical "Reko-" feedwater heater was retained. Cylinders and boiler superstructures were given partial cladding and small specially developed smoke deflectors were attached. The chimney was shaped as a flanged chimney according to the original Maffei design. For a tender, it received a standard 2′2′ T34 tender. The maximum permissible speed has been increased to 150 km/h (93 mph). The locomotive was painted green with white stripes. The renovation was completed on 18 December 1960.

In 1967 the locomotive was converted to oil firing. In addition to the test runs, it was also used in the express train service on the Halle – Berlin and Halle – Saalfeld routes. The locomotive was place in store on 31 December 1971 and withdrawn from service on 1 August 1972. The locomotive was then handed over to the Dresden Transport Museum, but was only rarely exhibited.

Since only one of the high-speed locomotives was to be maintained by the Reichsbahn and the 18 201 was chosen, the 18 314 was sold to the Frankfurt Historical Railway Association in 1984. Today it is in the Auto and Technology Museum in Sinsheim.
