= Bavarian P 3/5 H =

Bavarian P 3/5 H DRG Class 38.4
Type and origin
- Builder: Maffei
- Build date: 1921
- Total produced: 80
Specifications
- Configuration
  - Whyte: 4-6-0
  - German: P35.15
- Gauge: 1,435 mm (4 ft 8 1/2 in)
- Leading dia.: 850 mm (2 ft 9 1/2 in)
- Driver dia.: 1,640 mm (5 ft 4 5/8 in)
- Length
  - Over beams: 19,439 mm (63 ft 9 1/4 in)
- Axle load: 15.7 t (15.5 long tons; 17.3 short tons)
- Adhesive weight: 47.1 t (46.4 long tons; 51.9 short tons)
- Empty weight: 65.7 t (64.7 long tons; 72.4 short tons)
- Service weight: 72.1 t (71.0 long tons; 79.5 short tons)
- Tender type: Bavarian 2′2′ T 21.8
- Fuel capacity: 8,000 kg (18,000 lb)
- Water cap.: 21.8 m^{3} (4,800 imp gal; 5,800 US gal)
- Boiler pressure: 15 kgf/cm^{2} (1.47 MPa; 213 lbf/in^{2})
- Heating surface
  - Firebox: 2.77 m^{2} (29.8 sq ft)
  - Evaporative: 142.70 m^{2} (1,536.0 sq ft)
- Superheater
  - Heating area: 34.92 m^{2} (375.9 sq ft)
- Cylinders: 4, compound
- High-pressure cylinder: 360 mm (14 3/16 in)
- Low-pressure cylinder: 590 mm (23 1/4 in)
- Piston stroke: 640 mm (25 3/16 in)
Performance figures
- Maximum speed: 90 or 50 km/h (56 or 31 mph)
- Indicated power: 1,200 PS (883 kW; 1,180 hp)
Career
- Numbers: Bay.Sts.E.: 3837–3916; DRG 38 401 – 38 480
- Retired: 1955

After the foundation of the Deutsche Reichsbahn the Bavarian Group Administration tasked the firm of Maffei with the construction of 80 locomotives of the Bavarian Class P 3/5 H. These machines were based on the Class P 3/5 N, but had a superheated steam boiler. Positive experience with these vehicles built in 1921 – they were even used on express train duties – led in 1924 to the rebuild of all available Class P 3/5 N engines into superheated steam locomotives.

In 1925 the P 3/5 H were allocated the numbers 38 401 to 38 480 as part of the DRG Class 38.4.

All 80 locomotives survived the Second World War and entered service with the Deutsche Bundesbahn. The last engine of this class, number 38 432, ran in Bavaria and Upper Swabia and was taken out of service in 1955.

The vehicles were coupled with a Bavarian 2′2′ T 21,8 tender.

== See also ==
- Royal Bavarian State Railways
- List of Bavarian locomotives and railbuses
