= Bavarian S 2/5 =

Bavarian S 2/5 DRG Class 14.1
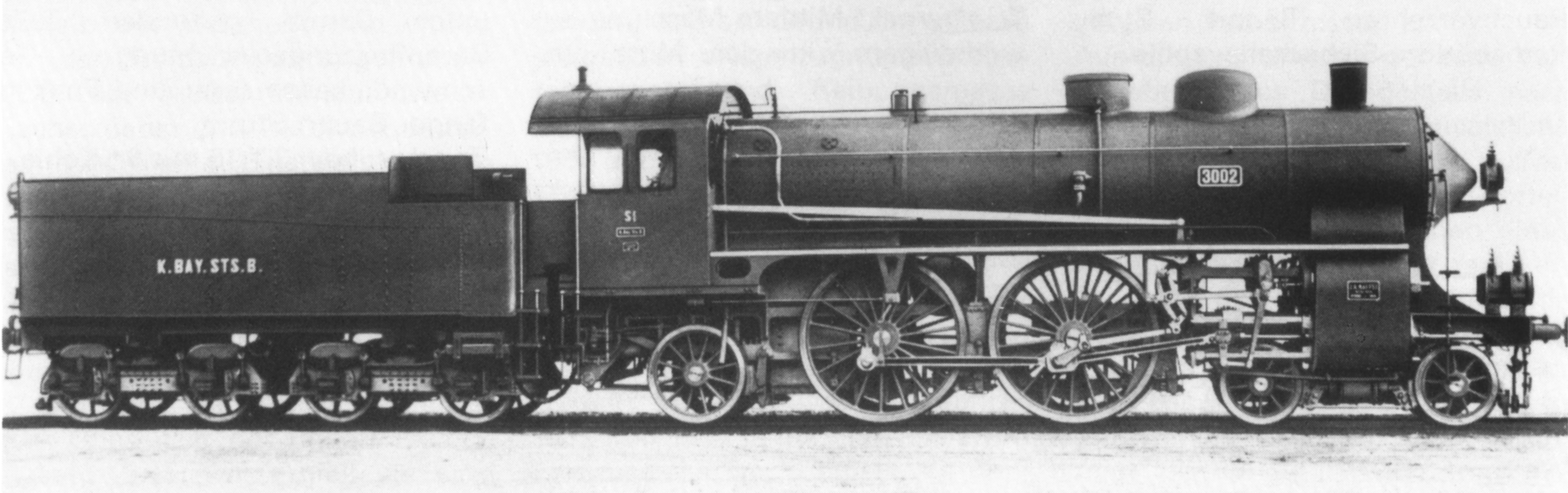
- Bavarian S 2/5
Type and origin
- Builder: Maffei
- Build date: 1904
- Total produced: 10
Specifications
- Configuration
  - Whyte: 4-4-2
  - German: S 25.16
- Gauge: 1,435 mm (4 ft 8 1/2 in)
- Leading dia.: 950 mm (3 ft 1 3/8 in)
- Driver dia.: 2,000 mm (6 ft 6 3/4 in)
- Trailing dia.: 1,206 mm (3 ft 11 1/2 in)
- Length
  - Over beams: 19,275 mm (63 ft 2 3/4 in)
- Axle load: 16.0 t (15.7 long tons; 17.6 short tons)
- Adhesive weight: 32.0 t (31.5 long tons; 35.3 short tons)
- Empty weight: 62.2 t (61.2 long tons; 68.6 short tons)
- Service weight: 68.6 t (67.5 long tons; 75.6 short tons)
- Tender type: Bavarian 2′2′ T 21
- Fuel capacity: 7 t (15,400 lb) of coal
- Water cap.: 21.0 m^{3} (4,600 imp gal; 5,500 US gal)
- Boiler
- No. of heating tubes: 278
- Boiler pressure: 16 kgf/cm^{2} (1.57 MPa; 228 lbf/in^{2})
- Heating surface
  - Firebox: 3.27 m^{2} (35.2 sq ft)
  - Radiative: 14.5 m^{2} (156 sq ft)
  - Tubes: 191 m^{2} (2,060 sq ft)
  - Evaporative: 205.50 m^{2} (2,212.0 sq ft)
- Cylinders: 4, compound
- High-pressure cylinder: 340 mm (13 3/8 in)
- Low-pressure cylinder: 570 mm (22 7/16 in)
- Piston stroke: 640 mm (25 3/16 in)
- Valve gear: Walschaerts (Heusinger)
Performance figures
- Maximum speed: 110 km/h (68 mph)
Career
- Numbers: K.Bay.Sts.E.: 3001–3010; DRG: 14 141 – 14 145
- Retired: by 1927

The Class S 2/5 express locomotives of the Royal Bavarian State Railways (Königlich Bayerische Staats-Eisenbahnen) were the first steam engines in Germany to be built with full-length bar frames (durchgehendem Barrenrahmen). The prototypes for this type of frame were the two locomotives imported in 1900 from Baldwin Locomotive Works in the US, that had been similarly classified as the S 2/5.

== History ==
In 1904, Maffei built ten engines that shared many of the same components as the S 3/5, which was developed in parallel. For example, they did not use a wider firebox, which would have been possible given the wheel arrangement, in order to be able to use one that could be used on the S 3/5. So the firebox was only around 90 mm wider than the bar frame of the locomotive. For manufacturing reasons the sole bar was still not made of one piece, but forged from several bars.

For the first time in Bavaria a driving wheel diameter of 2,000 mm was chosen instead of the 1,870 mm diameter hitherto the norm for express train locomotives. Like the locomotives imported from the United States, they had a four-cylinder compound engine. However the usual European (von Borries) configuration with two inside and two outside cylinders was used instead of the Vauclain compound system.

On test runs, one of the locomotives reached 135 km/h; in normal use, 110 km/h was the top speed. The locomotives were initially stabled at Munich I shed and hauled such famous trains as the Orient Express and the North-South Express, amongst others. But, as on all German Atlantics the traction of the two driven axles was soon insufficient. The S 2/5 was not blessed with a long time in service, although the locomotive had very good riding qualities and was seen as a genuinely fast runner.

In 1910 the locomotives went across to the Palatine network to Ludwigshafen shed and also to the Nuremberg repair shop. In 1922 only eight S 2/5 engines remained. The Deutsche Reichsbahn took over just five locomotives as the Class 14.1, numbered 14 141–145. They were retired in 1927.

The locomotives had Bavarian 2'2' T 21 tenders.

== See also ==
- Royal Bavarian State Railways
- List of Bavarian locomotives and railbuses
