= Baden IV f =

IV f DR Class 18^{2}
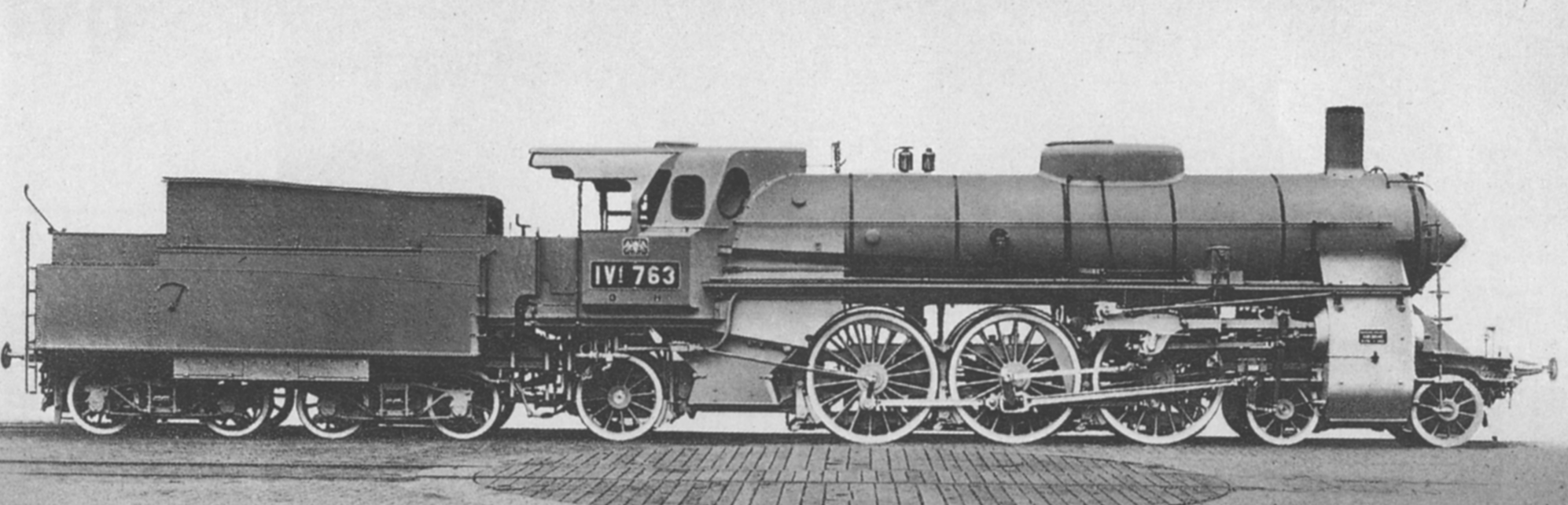
- No. 763 works photograph
Type and origin
- Builder: Maffei; MBG Karlsruhe
- Build date: 1907–1913
- Total produced: 35
Specifications
- Configuration
  - Whyte: 4-6-2
  - German: S 36.16
- Gauge: 1,435 mm (4 ft 8 1/2 in)
- Leading dia.: 990 mm (3 ft 3 in)
- Coupled dia.: 1,800 mm (5 ft 10 7/8 in)
- Trailing dia.: 1,200 mm (3 ft 11 1/4 in)
- Wheelbase
  - Bogie: 2,200 mm (7 ft 2 1/2 in)
  - Overall: 11,210 mm (36 ft 9 1/4 in)
  - incl. tender: 18,350 mm (60 ft 2 1/2 in)
- Length
  - Over beams: 21,121 mm (69 ft 3 1/2 in)
- Height: 4,150 mm (13 ft 7 3/8 in)
- Axle load: 16.50 t (16.24 long tons; 18.19 short tons); 16.40 t (16.14 long tons; 18.08 short tons)^{1) 2)}
- Adhesive weight: 49.50 t (48.72 long tons; 54.56 short tons); 49.30 t (48.52 long tons; 54.34 short tons) ^{1)}; 49.20 t (48.42 long tons; 54.23 short tons) ^{2)}
- Empty weight: 81.20 t (79.92 long tons; 89.51 short tons); 79.20 t (77.95 long tons; 87.30 short tons) ^{1)}; 79.60 t (78.34 long tons; 87.74 short tons) ^{2)}
- Service weight: 88.30 t (86.91 long tons; 97.33 short tons); 89.70 t (88.28 long tons; 98.88 short tons) ^{1)}; 88.60 t (87.20 long tons; 97.66 short tons) ^{2)}
- Boiler
- No. of heating tubes: 175, 182 ^{1) 2)}
- No. of smoke tubes: 25
- Heating tube length: 5,100 mm (16 ft 8 3/4 in)
- Boiler pressure: 16 kg/cm^{2} (1.57 MPa; 228 psi)
- Heating surface
  - Firebox: 4.50 m^{2} (48.4 sq ft)
  - Radiative: 14.65 m^{2} (157.7 sq ft)
  - Tubes: 194.07 m^{2} (2,089.0 sq ft)
  - Evaporative: 208.72 m^{2} (2,246.6 sq ft)
- Superheater
  - Heating area: 50.00 m^{2} (538.2 sq ft)
- Cylinders: 4
- High-pressure cylinder: 425 mm (16 3/4 in)
- Low-pressure cylinder: 650 mm (25 9/16 in)
- Piston stroke: HP: 610 mm (24 in); LP: 670 mm (26 3/8 in)
- Valve gear: Walschaerts (Heusinger)
Performance figures
- Maximum speed: 100 km/h (62 mph)
- Indicated power: 1,770 PS (1,300 kW; 1,750 hp)
Career
- Numbers: G.Bad.St.E.: 751–765, 833–852; DRG: 18 201, 211–217, 231–238, 251–256
- ^{1)}1912 series^{2)}1913 series

The class IV f locomotives of the Grand Duchy of Baden State Railway (German: Großherzoglich Badische Staatseisenbahnen, G.Bad.St.E.) were express locomotives with a 4-6-2 (Pacific) wheel arrangement. They later passed to the Deutsche Reichsbahn, who classified them as class 18.2. These were the first Pacific locomotives in Germany and the second in Europe after the Paris-Orléans Railway 4500-series that had appeared a few months earlier.

== History ==
The locomotives were produced in four batches between 1907 and 1913. The first batch of three locomotives was built in 1907 by Maffei. The remaining 32 locomotives were then manufactured under license in three batches by the Maschinenbau-Gesellschaft Karlsruhe.

Table of numbers and orders
Year	Quantity	Manufacturer	Serial nos.	G.Bad.St.E. no.	DRG no.
1907	3	Maffei	2512–2514	751–753	–, –, 18 201
1909-10	12	MBG	1785–1796	754–765	18 211–14, —, 215, —,—,—
1911–12	12	MBG	1839–1850	833–844	18 231, 232, —, 233–235, —,—, 236, 237, —, 238
1913	8	MBG	1864–1871	845–852	18 251–254, —, 255, —, 256

Maffei had already won the competition for the new locomotive in 1905. However, the preparation of the plans was delayed until 1907. When designing the locomotive, Maffei succeeded in synthesizing the German and American locomotive building traditions. The 4-6-2 wheel arrangement and the bar frame were adopted from America, while four-cylinder compound engines of the Borries type and the sleek design are of German origin

Because the locomotives were to be used both on the flat Rhine Valley route and in the mountains on the Odenwald and Black Forest railways, they had a driving wheel diameter of only 1,800 mm (5 ft 10 7/8 in). They proved to be unsuitable for the intended operation in the flatlands. The small driving wheel diameter for express steam locomotives led to comparatively high revolutions per minute. This led to greater stress on the engine, which often resulted in damage. With the successor series IV h, a drive wheel diameter of 2,100 mm (6 ft 10 5/8 in) was consequently chosen. The IV f locomotives were able to pull a 460-tonne (450-long-ton; 510-short-ton) train at 110 km/h (68 mph) on the level, and a 194-tonne (191-long-ton; 214-short-ton) train up a gradient of 16.3 ‰ (1.63 % or 1 in 61.3) at 55 km/h (34 mph).

In 1925, the Deutsche Reichsbahn took over only 22 of the 35 built locomotives as class 18.2. They were given the road numbers 18 201, 18 211 to 18 217, 18 231 to 18 238 and 18 251 to 18 256. The high-maintenance locomotives were withdrawn by 1930 – significantly earlier than the other German Pacific classes.

In 1961 Deutsche Reichsbahn gave the newly rebuilt locomotive 18 201 its number as a nod to the first German Pacific locomotive.

== Construction ==
The long boiler was riveted and consisted of three courses. The steam dome and sand dome sat on the front boiler course. The superheater was of the Schmidt type. The boiler and the cylinder blocks were clad in sheet metal. The boiler was pitched relatively highly with a height of 2,820 mm (9 ft 3 in) on the centre line

In order to accommodate a large grate area, it was moved behind the coupled axles. However, this made it necessary to install a trailing axle. The front and rear of the firebox were tilted forward for a better centre of gravity.

The bar frame was 100 mm (3 7/8 in) thick and was forged from three parts.

Load balancing was installed Between the last coupling axle and the trailing axle was a load adjustment device, which made it possible to increase the adhesive weight from 49.6 to 52.4 tonnes (48.8 to 51.6 long tons; 54.7 to 57.8 short tons). From the 1912 delivery series onwards, this device was not installed.

The low-pressure cylinders were on the outside, the high-pressure cylinders on the inside. All four cylinders worked on the second coupled axle. To facilitate starting, a Maffei type bypass valves were installed to permit high pressure steam to be admitted to the low pressure cylinders.
