= Bavarian S 3/6 =

Class of 159 German 4-6-2 locomotives

Bavarian S 3/6 DRG Class 18.4
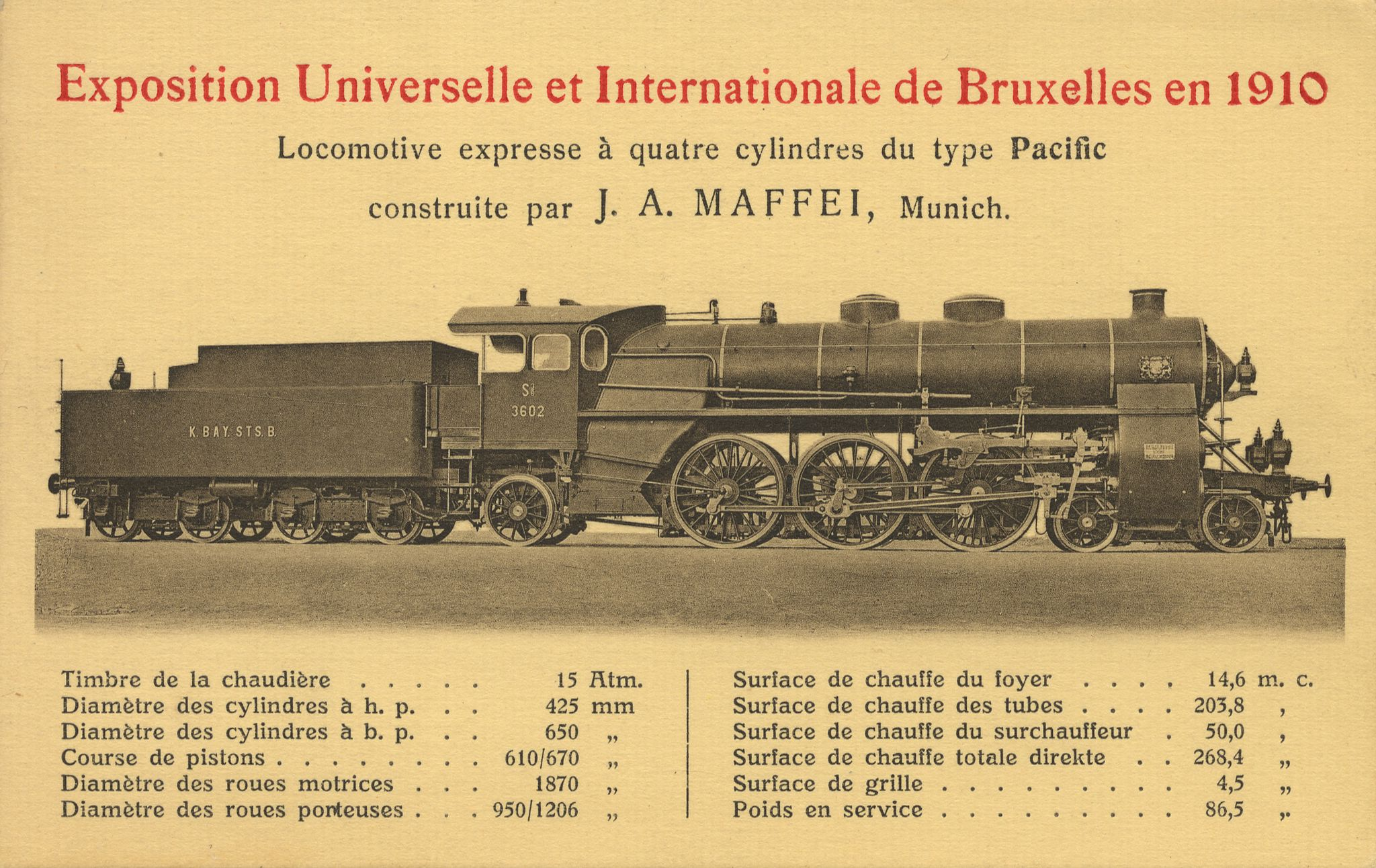
- Bavarian S 3/6, Series a to c
Type and origin
- Build date: 1908–1931
- Total produced: 159
Specifications
- Configuration
  - Whyte: 4-6-2
- Gauge: 1,435 mm (4 ft 8 1/2 in) standard gauge
- Leading dia.: 950 mm (37 3/8 in)
- Driver dia.: 1,870 mm (73 5/8 in)
- Trailing dia.: 1,206 mm (47 1/2 in)
- Length
  - Over beams: 21,396 mm (70 ft 2 1/4 in)
- Axle load: 16.8 t (16.5 long tons; 18.5 short tons)
- Adhesive weight: 49.6 t (48.8 long tons; 54.7 short tons)
- Service weight: 88.3 t (86.9 long tons; 97.3 short tons)
- Water cap.: 26.2 m^{3} (5,800 imp gal; 6,900 US gal)
- Boiler pressure: 15 kgf/cm^{2} (1.47 MPa; 213 lbf/in^{2})
- Heating surface
  - Firebox: 4.53 m^{2} (48.8 sq ft)
  - Evaporative: 197.41 m^{2} (2,124.9 sq ft)
- Superheater
  - Heating area: 74.16 m^{2} (798.3 sq ft)
- Cylinders: 4, compound
- High-pressure cylinder: 425 mm (16 3/4 in)
- Low-pressure cylinder: 670 mm (26 3/8 in)
- Piston stroke: HP: 610 mm (24 in); LP: 670 mm (26 3/8 in)
Performance figures
- Maximum speed: 120 km/h (75 mph)
- Indicated power: 1,770 PS (1,300 kW; 1,750 hp)
Career
- Numbers: K.Bay.Sts.E.: 3601–3623, 3642–3709; DRG 18 401 – 18 434, 18 461 – 18 548
- Retired: by 1969

The Class S 3/6 steam locomotives of the Royal Bavarian State Railways (later Class 18.4-5 of the Deutsche Reichsbahn) were express train locomotives with a 4-6-2 Pacific (Whyte notation) or 2'C1' (UIC classification) wheel arrangement.

Of all the state railway locomotives, these engines are remarkable because they were made over a period of almost 25 years, even during the Deutsche Reichsbahn era. A total of 159 units were manufactured, more than all the other state railway Pacifics taken together. A total of 89 of these locomotives (Series a to i) were built for the Royal Bavarian State Railways and 70 (Series k to o) for the Deutsche Reichsbahn.

== Common features ==
The S 3/6, designed by the Maffei company under the leadership of engineers Anton Hammel and Heinrich Leppla, was a development of the first German Pacific, the somewhat smaller Baden IV f. Like its forerunner, the S 3/6 had a four-cylinder compound running gear with single-axle drive on the second coupled axle. With the exception of series d and e, that had a coupled wheel diameter of 2,000 mm, the S 3/6 had a coupled wheel diameter of 1,870 mm, that allowed it to be deployed both in hilly terrain as well as on the plains.

The permitted top speed of the locomotives was 120 km/h, regardless of the driving wheel diameter. Its performance increased during its production lifetime from 1,770 to 1,830 PS (1,300 to 1,350 kW; 1,750 to 1,800 hp)

== Royal Bavarian State Railways ==
=== Series 0 ===
Maffei delivered the first engine on 16 June 1908, four days later the second, another five prototypes followed until November of the same year, numbers 3601 to 3607.

=== Series a ===
The first official series of ten locomotives were built until September 1909, numbers 3608 to 3617.

=== Series b ===
This series only consisted of the number 3618, construction number 3142, build 1910 especially for the Brussels International Exposition, adorned with brass trim and dark blue bright sheet metal trim.

=== Series c ===
In May and June 1911 another five engines were produced as Series c.

All of them above had a driving wheel diameter 1,870 mm and were coupled to 2'2' T 26,2 tenders.

=== Series d and e ===
Bavarian S 3/6 Series d & e
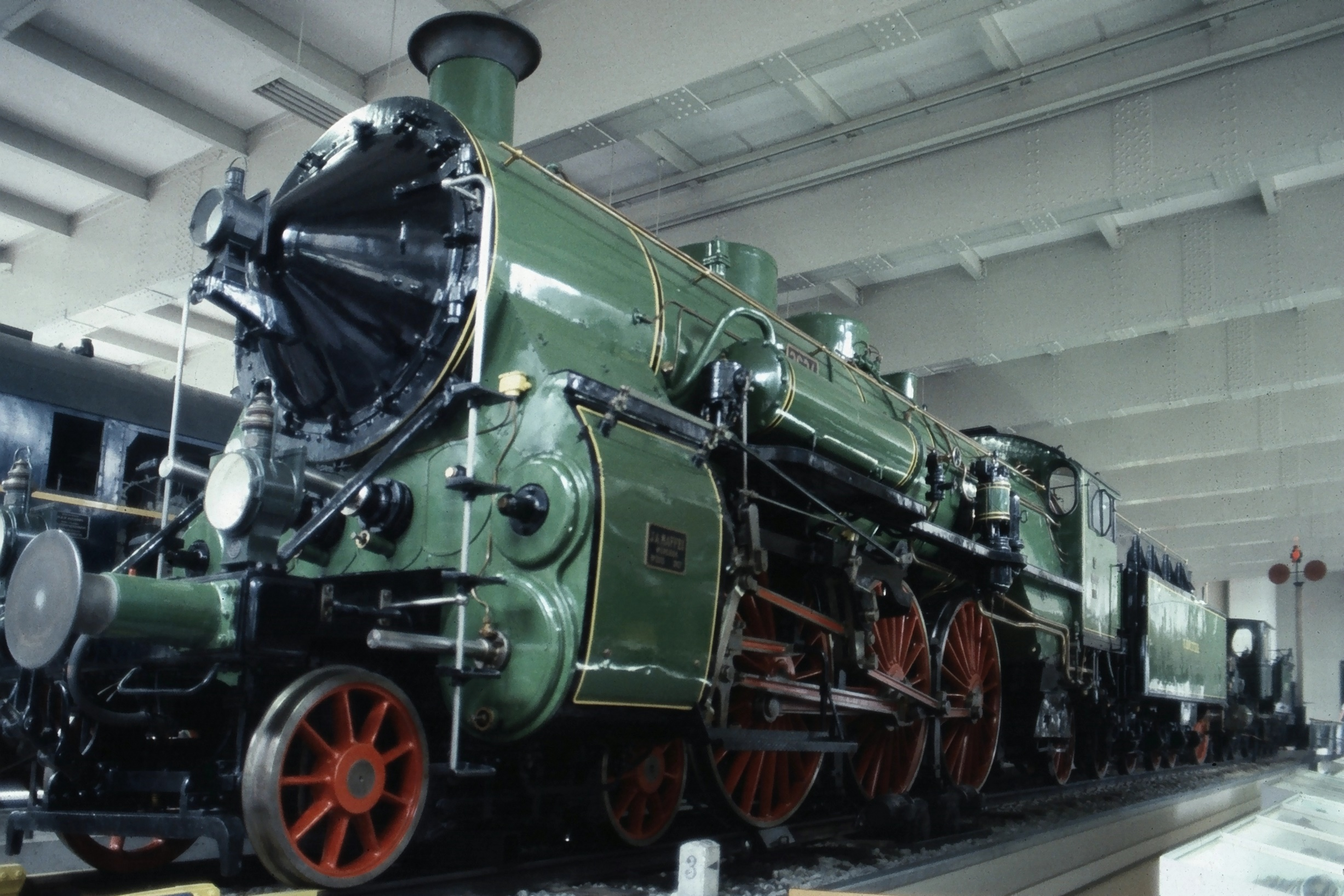
- S 3/6 3634 in the Deutsches Museum
Type and origin
- Build date: 1912
- Total produced: 18
Specifications
- Driver dia.: 2,000 mm (78 3/4 in)
- Length
  - Over beams: 22,095 mm (72 ft 6 in)
- Axle load: 16.7 t (16.4 long tons; 18.4 short tons)
- Adhesive weight: 48.0 t (47.2 long tons; 52.9 short tons)
- Service weight: 89.5 t (88.1 long tons; 98.7 short tons)
- Water cap.: 32.5 m^{3} (7,100 imp gal; 8,600 US gal)
- Piston stroke: HP & LP: 670 mm (26 3/8 in)
Career
- Numbers: K.Bay.Sts.E.: 3624–3641; DRG: 18 441 – 18 458
- Retired: 1949–1954
- technical data given where different

In 1912, 18 series d and e machines were produced, with a 2,000 mm driving wheel diameter. They were intended specifically for express train service on the relatively flat routes between Munich and Nuremberg as well as between Munich and Würzburg. Unlike the other locomotives, both high- and low-pressure cylinders had the same piston stroke. Although they were clearly intended for express services, these locomotives were not given a streamlined driver's cab.

One of the locomotives, number 3634 (18 451) is preserved and is housed in the Deutsches Museum in Munich.

A larger tender, the 2'2 T 32, was developed for series d and e.

=== Series f ===
There were only three locomotives in series f built in 1913. They were not significantly different from those of series a to c.

=== Series g ===
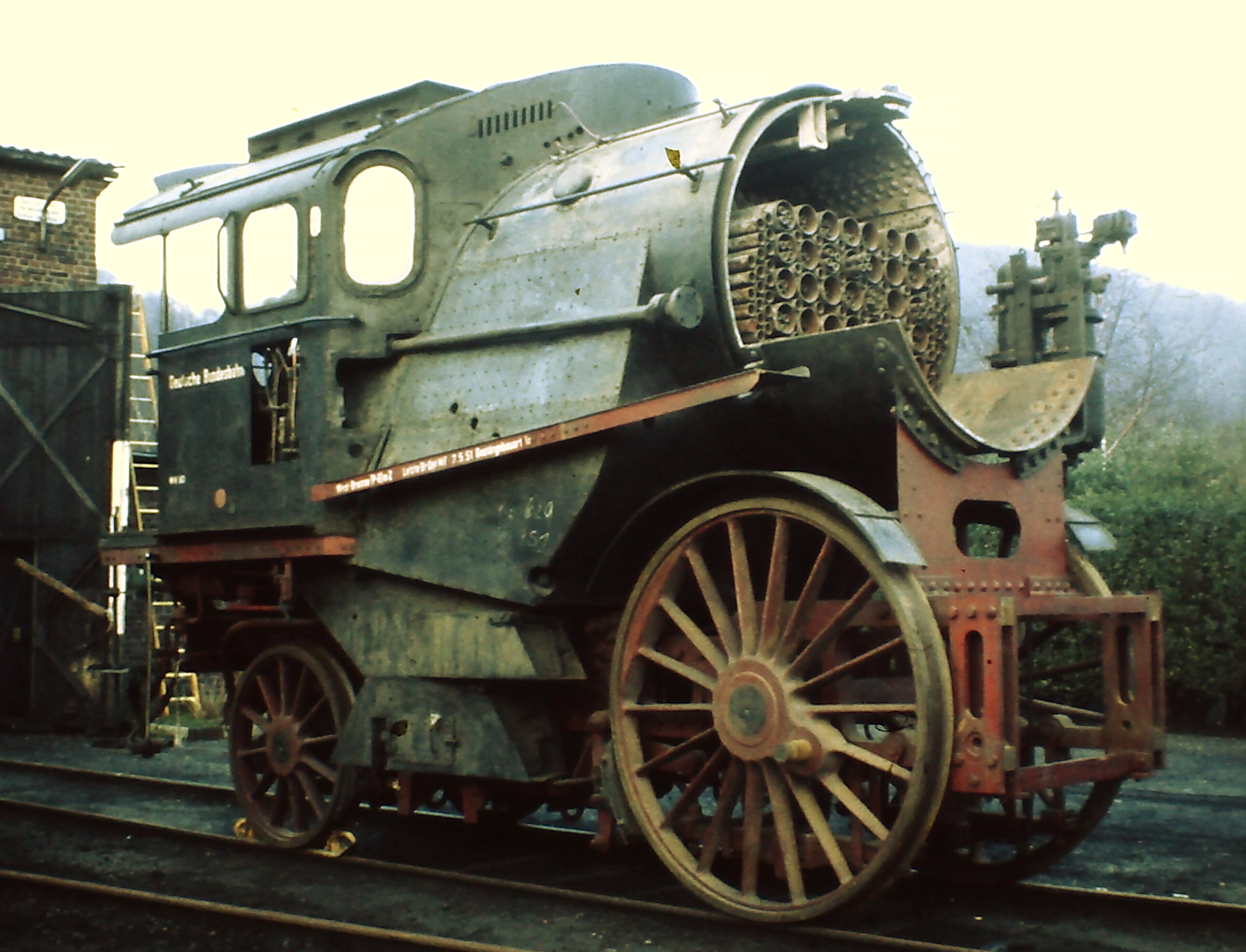
The torso of no. 18 427 at the Bochum-Dahlhausen Railway Museum (to 2010)

In 1914, 10 locomotives were built for the Palatinate (Pfalz) network. They differed from previous engines in several of their dimensions. For example, they were about 150 mm shorter, in order to fit on the 19 m turntables there.

These locomotives were given the numbers 18 425 to 18 434 by the Deutsche Reichsbahn. One remained in the Soviet Zone of Occupation after the Second World War and did not return to the west until 1948, when it was exchanged for a Baden IV h, number 18 314.

=== Series h and i ===
During World War I, from 1914 to 1918, 35 more locomotives were produced. They were the last S 3/6 engines built for the Royal Bavarian State Railways.

== Deutsche Reichsbahn ==
A total of 19 vehicles - including some brand new engines - had to be handed over to France and Belgium under the terms of the Armistice; the remainder went to the Deutsche Reichsbahn who gave them operating numbers 18 401 - 18 434, 18 441 - 18 458 and 18 461 - 18 478 in 1926. The S 3/6 became especially well known through its use as motive power for the Rheingold Express.

=== Series k ===
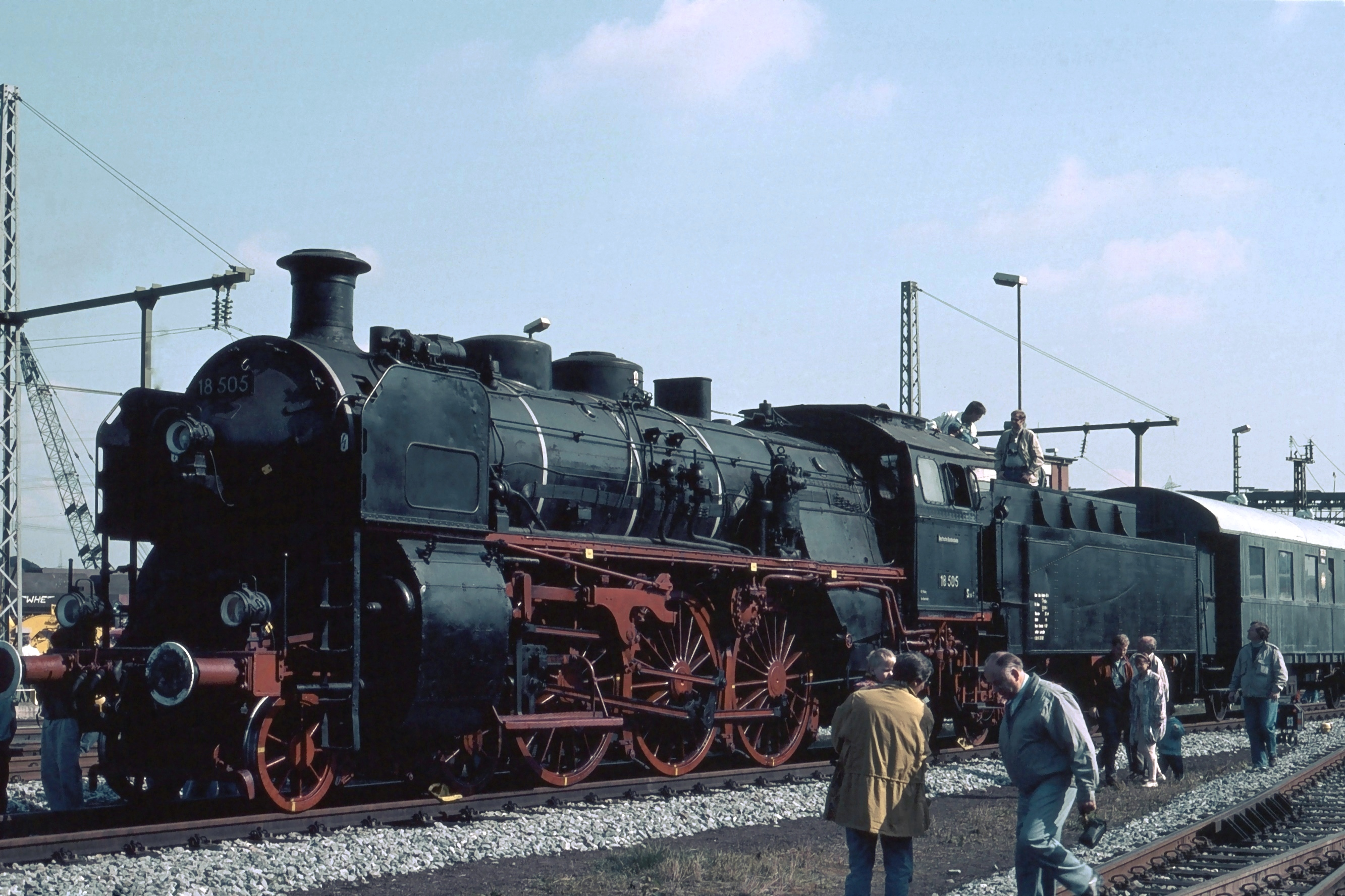
The preserved series k Bavarian S 3/6 built by the Deutsche Reichsbahn - number 018 505-8

Because standard locomotives had still not been built, the Reichsbahn continued to produce the proven S 3/6. In 1923 and 1924 Maffei supplied the series k with a total of 30 engines. They were given operating numbers 18 479 to 18 508. They differed from the earlier series: technically, because of a somewhat larger superheater, and optically, with a driver's cab without a Windschneide, but whose side walls were angled in the area of the windows as on the later standard locomotives. Several were supplied to the Wiesbaden engine shed in order to haul the 'FD' long-distance express train, the Rheingold.

Locomotive 18 505 is in the railway museum of the German Railway History Society (Deutsche Gesellschaft für Eisenbahngeschichte e. V. or DGEG) in Neustadt an der Weinstraße on the 'wine route' where it can be viewed. The last of these engines, no. 18 508, is in private ownership and stabled in Switzerland. (Locorama Romanshorn).

=== Series l, m, n and o ===
Because the production of standard locomotives was not envisaged in the first numbering plan and because the upgrade of main lines to 20 tons was proceeding very slowly, the Deutsche Reichsbahn ordered more Class S 3/6 locomotives from Maffei.

In 1927, 12 units of series l were delivered (18 509–520); in 1927–28 they were followed by eight engines of series m (18 521–528). Compared with series k, the superheater was somewhat larger again; in addition, the diameter of the high-pressure cylinder was increased from 425 mm to 440 mm. Several series m locomotives were supplied to Wiesbaden shed in order to haul important trains.

Of the 20 planned locomotives of series n, Maffei could only deliver 2 engines (18 529 and 530) before it went bankrupt. Henschel took over the order and supplied the rest of the 18 engines in 1930–31 as series o (18 531–548). The last 11 locos of this series were given a newly developed tender with the designation 2'2' T 31.7.

No. 18 528 is preserved and stood as a memorial in front of the HQ building of the former Krauss-Maffei company in Munich. The locomotive is now in a shelter in the grounds of the Allach factory, following the takeover of the former Krauss Maffei Transport Technology by Siemens, and is not accessible to the public.

== Deutsche Bundesbahn ==
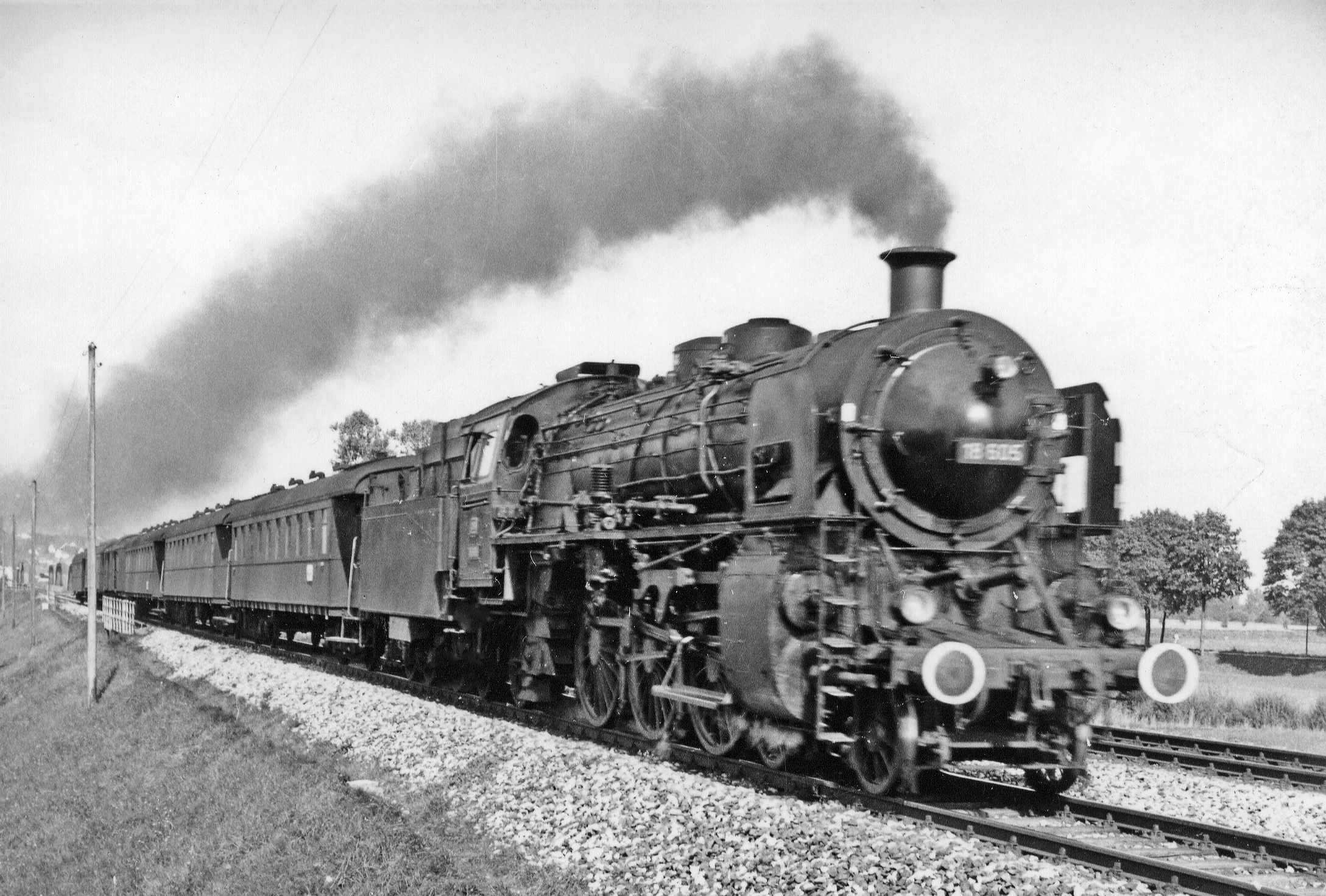
Locomotive No.18 605 at Erbach in 1958.

In the 1950s a large part of the Deutsche Bundesbahn's vehicle fleet underwent modernisation. As a result, 30 Class 18.5 engines were rebuilt by the firms of Krauss-Maffei and Henschel. These were the series l to o locomotives built for the Reichsbahn between 1927 and 1930.

These units were given a newly developed replacement boiler with combustion chamber at the Ingolstadt and Munich-Freimann repair sheds by the Minden engine shed and Krauss-Maffei. In addition the locomotives were given a new driver's cab and multiple-valve superheated steam regulator. Further planned modifications, such as new cylinder blocks, were not carried out.

The rebuilt locomotives placed in service between 1953 and 1957 were given the new operating numbers 18 601–630 and were used in express train services, where they almost matched the Class 01 in their performance. They were stationed in the engine sheds of Darmstadt, Hof, Regensburg, Nuremberg Main, Lindau and Ulm.

Although the modernised locomotives were very powerful and the most economical steam engines in the Deutsche Bundesbahn fleet, they were all withdrawn from service between 1961 and 1965. The reason was that, during the rebuild the pump mounting had been directly welded to the boiler which had led to the formation of cracks. The boiler pressure had therefore to be reduced from 16 to 14 bar, which meant the locomotives lost a considerable amount of power.

The last locomotives (18 622 and 18 630) were taken out of service in 1965 in Lindau and scrapped in 1966. By contrast number 18 612 is preserved in the German Steam Locomotive Museum (Deutsches Dampflokomotiv-Museum) where it can be viewed.

The unmodified S 3/6 engines were all withdrawn by 1962, apart from 18 505. This was still in service until 1967 with the LVA Minden and was not paid off until 1969 as number 018 505. It is preserved in the Neustadt/Weinstraße Railway Museum (Eisenbahnmuseum Neustadt/Weinstraße).

Several locomotives were rebuilt into heating locomotives (Heizlokomotive). Number 18 602, stationed in Saarbrücken was mustered out in 1983. Only the wheelsets remain and may be seen in the main railway station. Before its refurbishment, 18 612 was last used as a heating engine.

== 18 478 ==
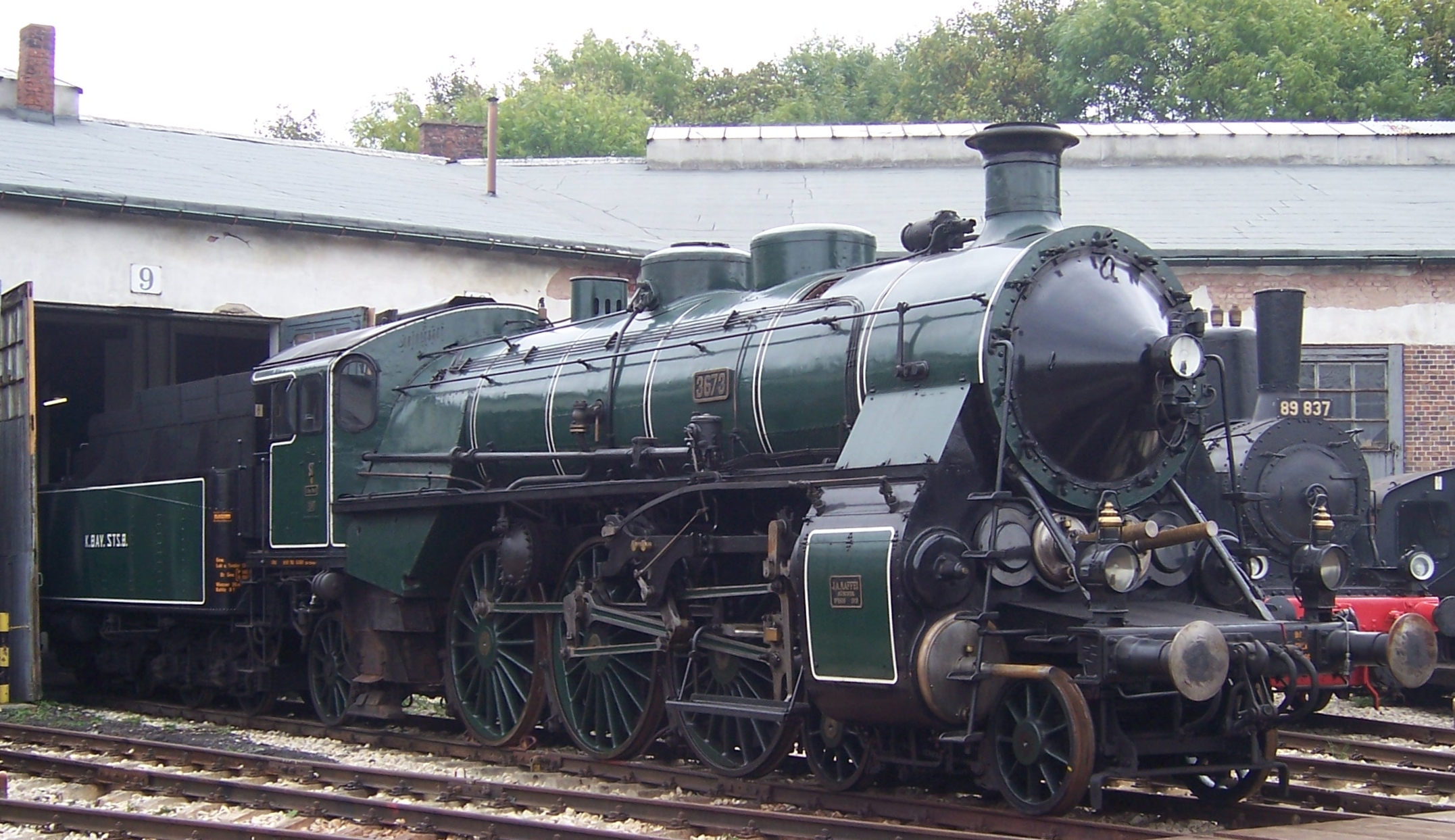
Locomotive No. 18 478

Number 18 478 (see infobox), stabled in Ulm was the last S 3/6 to be built in the state railway era (1918) and thus the last one also with a streamlined driver's cab (Windschneidenführerhaus). It found its way to Linz, where it was substantially restored by the Swiss, Serge Lory. Today this engine is in the ownership of the Bavarian Railway Museum (Bayerisches Eisenbahnmuseum) in Nördlingen. The locomotive was made operational again by the Meiningen Steam Locomotive Works (Dampflokwerk Meiningen) and was given a green state railway livery again and the original operating number 3673. From 1996, it could be seen on numerous specials.

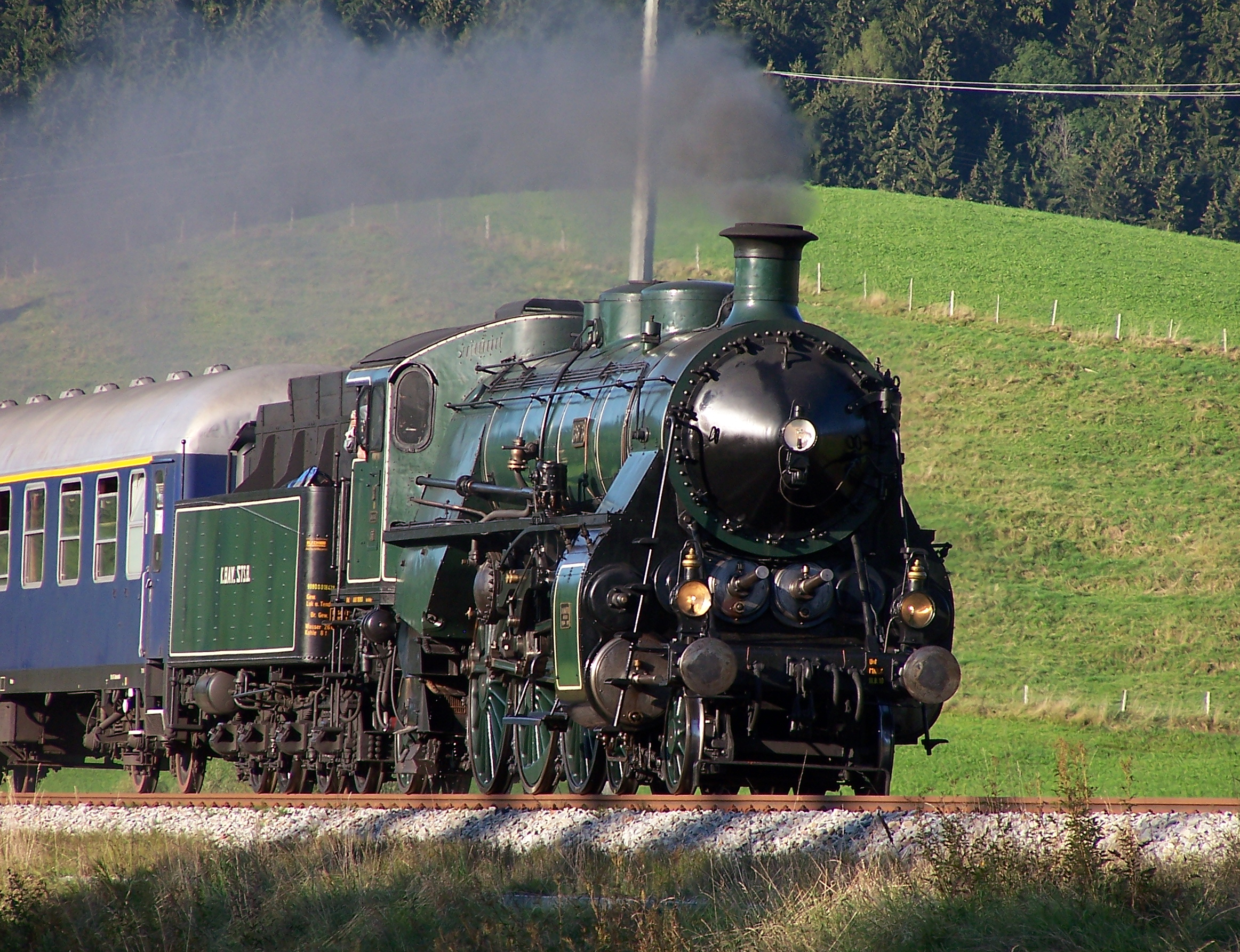
S 3/6 18 478 on the Buchloe–Lindau railway

The engine, temporarily painted in blue for advertising purposes under a contract from the firm of Märklin, has been stabled in Nördlingen since April 2004. In order to be used on future services, considerable work was necessary on the 87-year-old locomotive, which still has its original boiler. The engine had a second roll out in June 2010 and is again certified for passenger trains.

== See also ==
- Royal Bavarian State Railways
- List of Bavarian locomotives and railbuses
