= Maffei (company) =

German locomotive manufacturer (1836–1930)

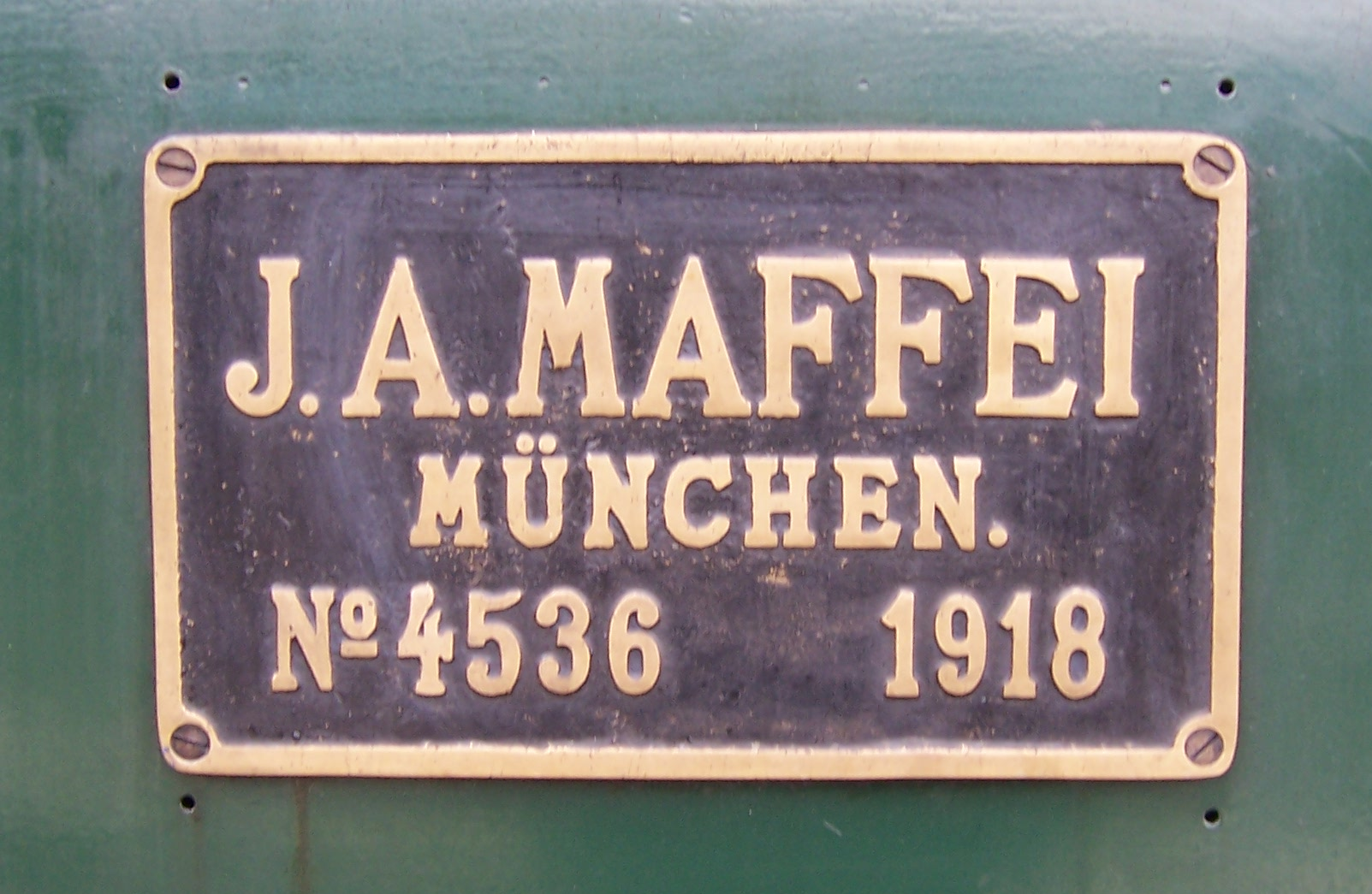
Works plate of J. A. Maffei 4536 of 1918 on Bavarian S 3/6 No. 3673 (later 18 478)

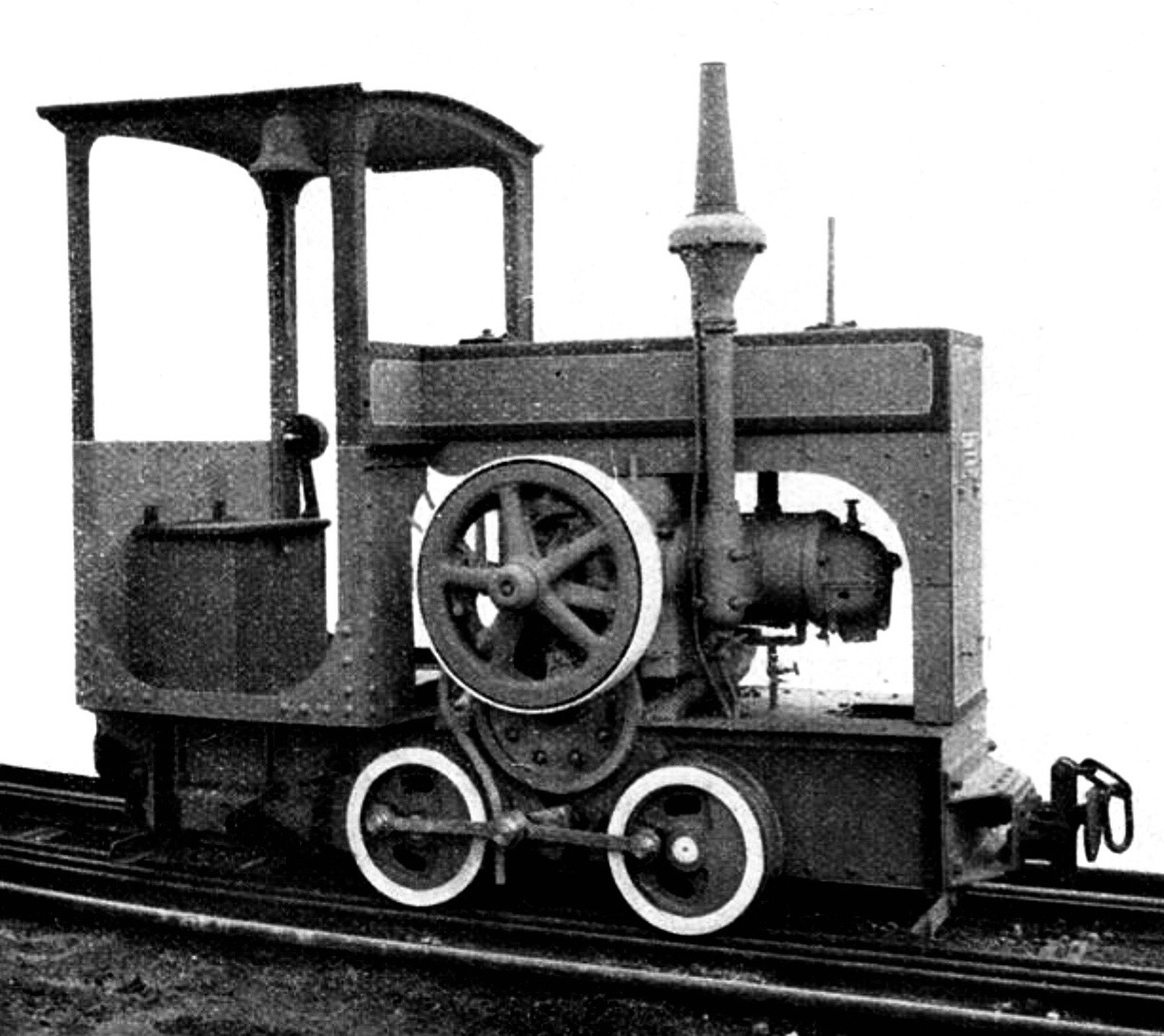
J. A. Maffei Lanz (1927)

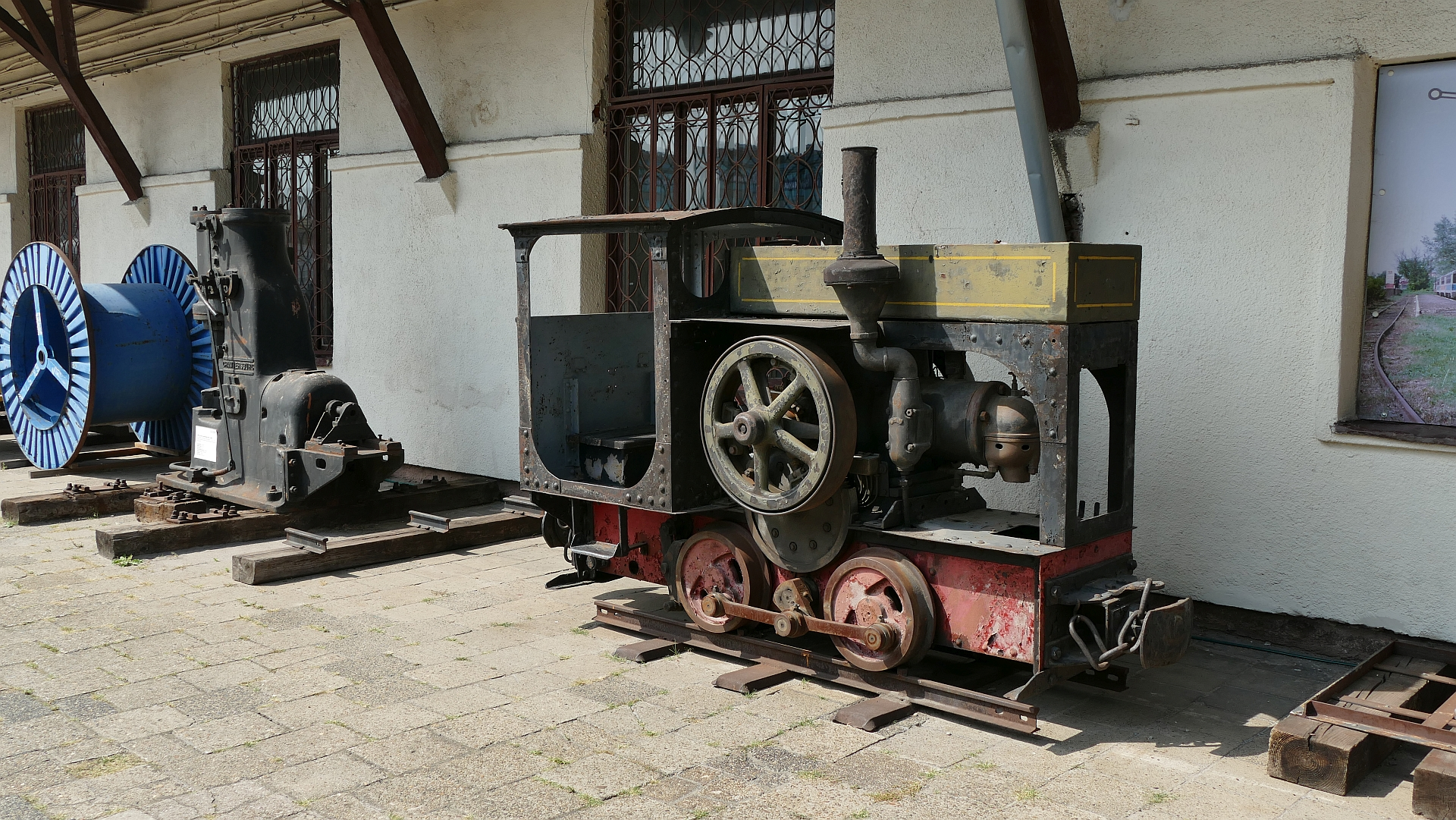
J. A. Maffei Lanz in museum Warsaw

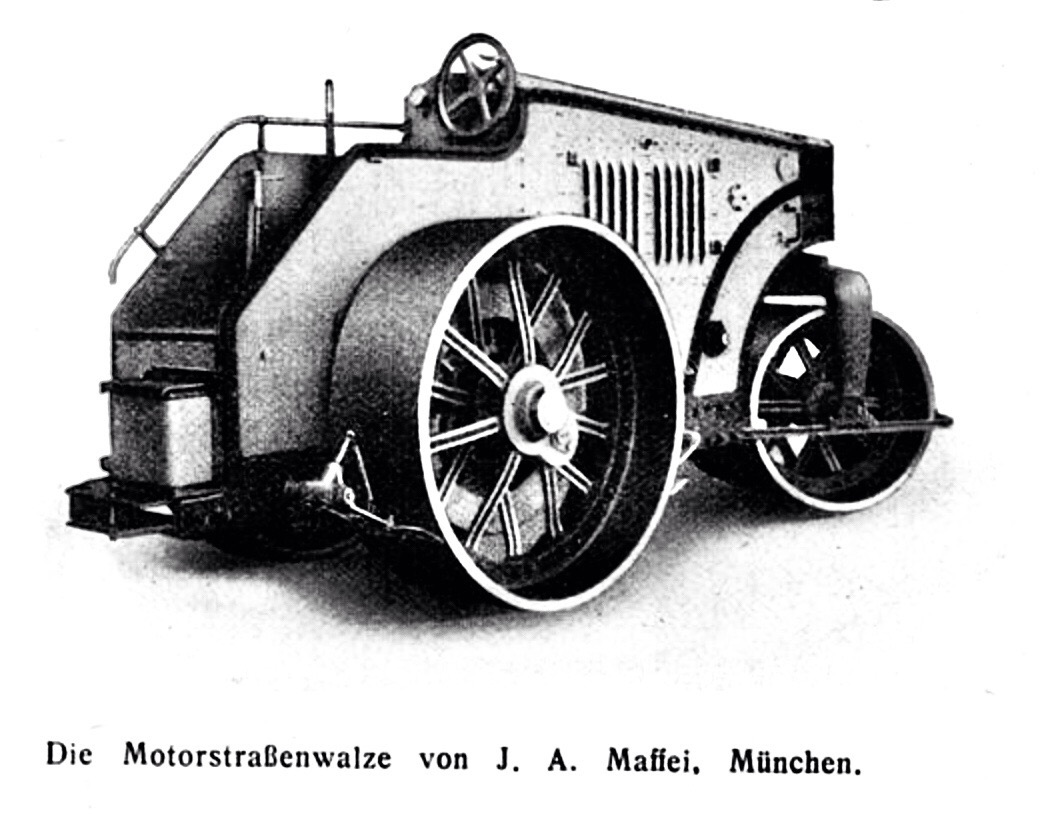
Roller J.A. Maffei (1927) Three-cylinder 27 hp

Maffei was a manufacturer of railway locomotives based in Munich, Germany. Established in 1836, it prospered for nearly a century before going bankrupt in 1930 and becoming amalgamated with the firm of Krauss to form Krauss-Maffei. Following another 70 years of prosperity Krauss-Maffei merged with Demag and Mannesmann in 1999, the resulting conglomerate in turn being sold to Siemens AG.

Perhaps J. A. Maffei's most famous product was the S3/6 4-6-2 locomotive of 1908.

== History ==
In 1836, Joseph Anton, Ritter von Maffei established the "J. A. Maffei" locomotive works in the English Garden district of Munich. The aim was to make Bavaria competitive in the machine industry. From these small beginnings a locomotive works eventually developed.

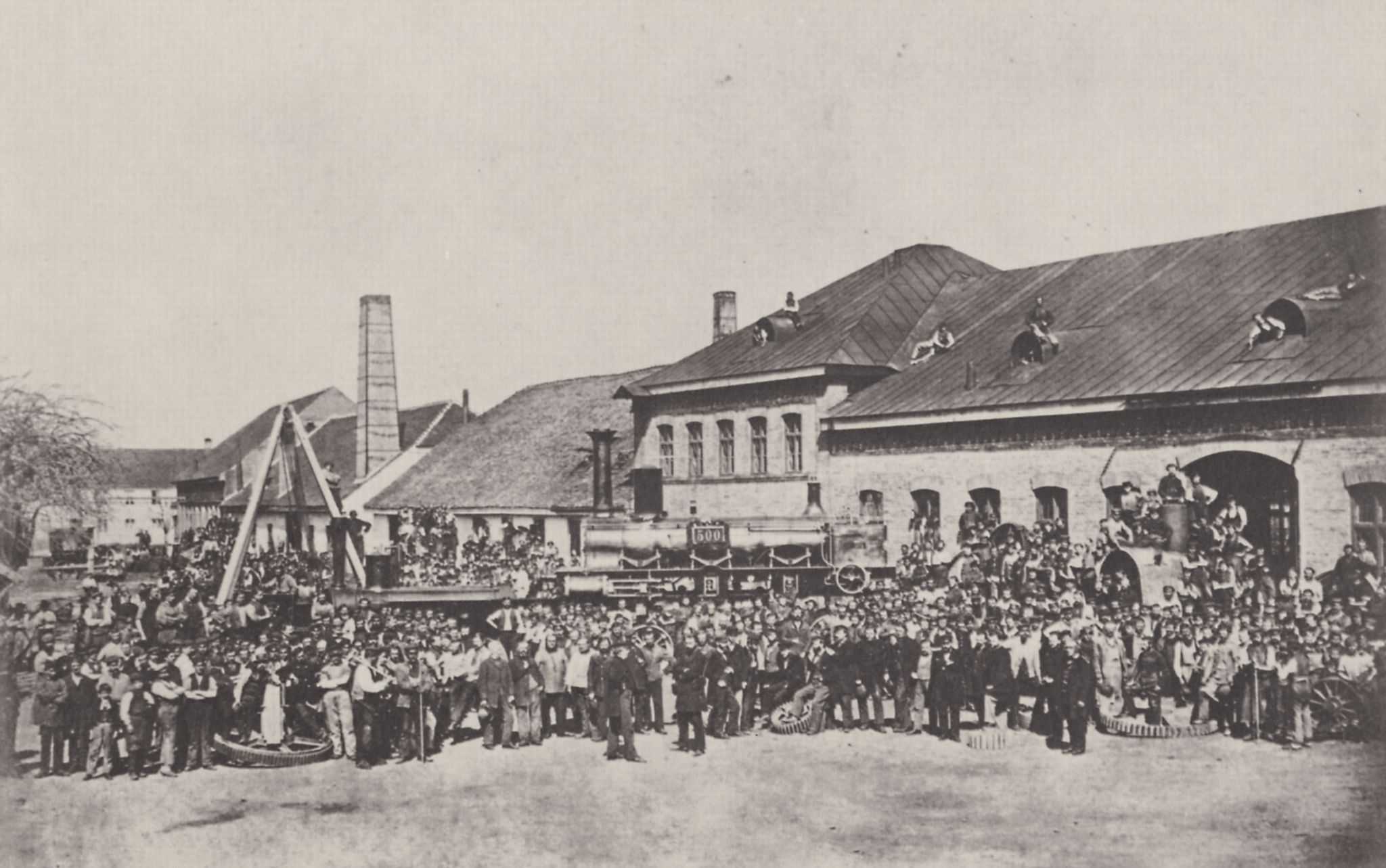
Maffei workers celebrate their 500th locomotive in 1864

In 1864, they delivered their 500th locomotive. Maffei, as a Munich town councillor, was praised for the building of the Hotel Bayerischer Hof. Well-known products of the locomotive works are the Bavarian S 2/6 express locomotive which held the 1907 German speed record of 154.5 km/h) and the Bavarian S 3/6. Examples of the S 3/6 are preserved in the Deutsches Museum in Munich and in the Nuremberg Transport Museum.

Maffei, amongst other things, involved itself with the building of the Augsburg Munich line and supported Johann Ulrich Himbsel in the building of the Munich - Starnberg line. Maffei, at Lake Starnberg, built their first steamer "Maximilian". By 1926, they had built 44 steam ships.

In 1930, the form of J.A.Maffei went into bankruptcy and in 1931, merged with the Krauss Company to form Krauss-Maffei. The Maffei mansion in Feldafing, by Lake Starnberg, today houses a museum and exhibitions.
