= DB Class 111 =

Electric locomotive used in Germany

Deutsche Bundesbahn Baureihe 111
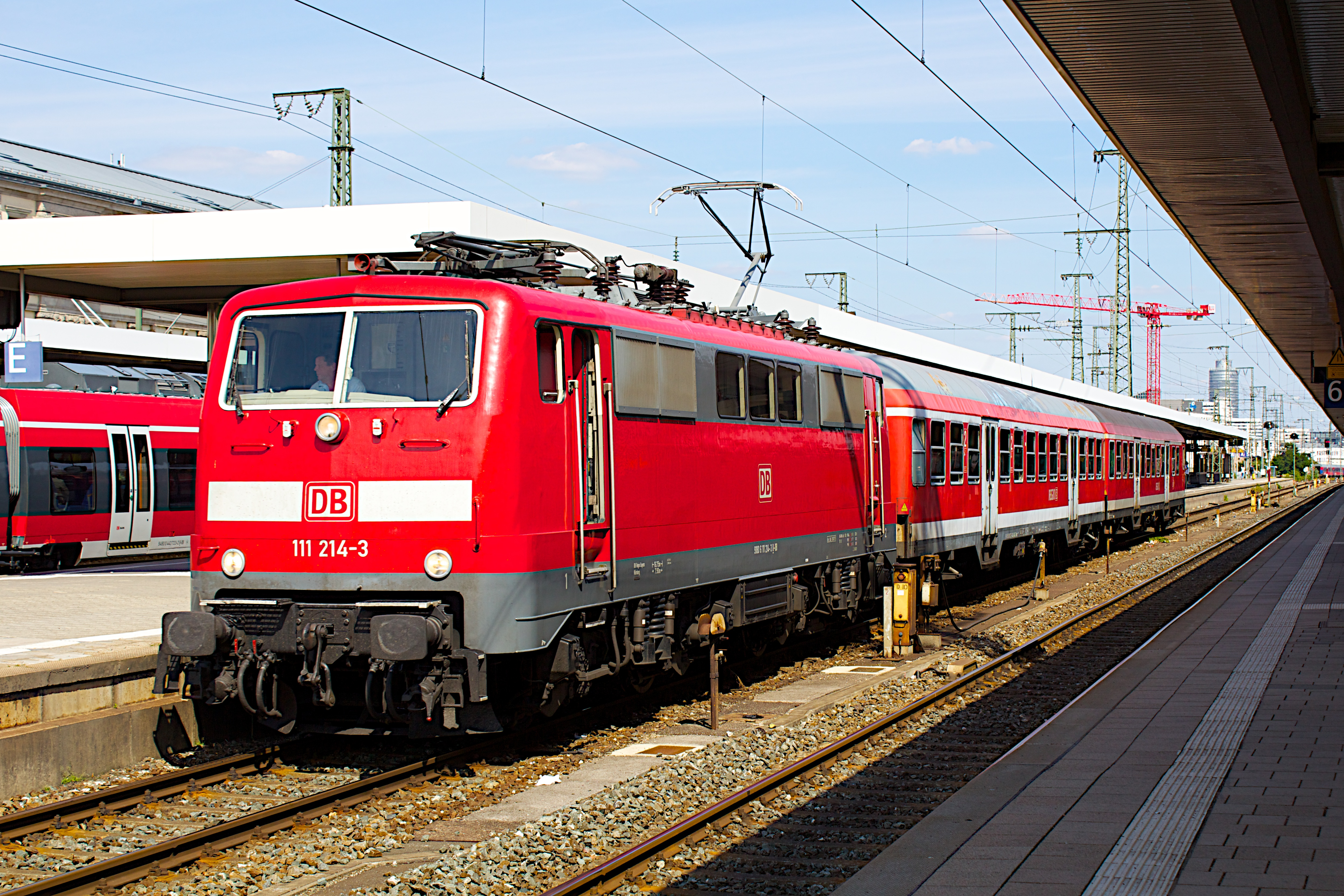
- DB 111 214-3 at Nürnberg Hbf, 2013.
Type and origin
- Power type: Electric
- Builder: Krauss-Maffei, Henschel, Krupp, Siemens, AEG and BBC
- Build date: 1974–1984
- Total produced: 227
Specifications
- Configuration
  - UIC: Bo′Bo′
- Gauge: 1,435 mm (4 ft 8 1/2 in) standard gauge
- Length: 16.75 m (54 ft 11 1/2 in)
- Loco weight: 83 tonnes (82 long tons; 91 short tons)
- Electric system/s: 15 kV 16.7 Hz AC Catenary
- Current pickup: Pantograph
- Traction motors: Four
- Loco brake: Knorr airbrake, electric brake
- Train brakes: Air
- Safety systems: Sifa, PZB90
Performance figures
- Maximum speed: 160 km/h (99 mph)
- Power output: 3,720 kW (4,990 hp)
- Tractive effort: 274 kN (62,000 lbf)
Career
- Operators: Deutsche Bundesbahn; Deutsche Bahn AG
- Class: 111
- Disposition: One each scrapped in 1981 and 2008, remainder in service

The Baureihe 111 is a class of electric locomotives built for the Deutsche Bundesbahn, and now owned by Deutsche Bahn.

== History ==
Class 111 is the successor of the Class 110 express Einheitslokomotive. Since demand for fast electric locomotives was high even after production of the 110 ended, the Deutsche Bundesbahn (DB) decided to commission a new batch in the 1970s.

The bogies were replaced with a different type, significantly improving the locomotive's behaviour at higher speeds. The driver's cab also was significantly improved by the DB-Einheitsführerstand (jointly developed by the Bundesbahn-Zentralamt München and Krauss-Maffei and designed under ergonomic aspects) that was first used for Class 111 locos and whose basic layout nowadays still forms part of the cab design found in many of DB's locomotives and control cars. For the first time, a digital cab car interface in addition to the then-standard conventional interface was used in new DB locomotives.

The first locomotive, 111 001, left the Krauss-Maffei workshop in December 1974. Up to 1984, 226 more engines were produced, not only at Krauss-Maffei but also including parts from Henschel, Krupp, Siemens, AEG and BBC.

111 227 originally was supposed to be the last newly built conventional AC locomotive of the DB, as the Baureihe 120, using three-phase AC motors, was already being produced. However, after the German reunification it was decided to commission another batch of the Class 112, which had been developed by the East German railways. This decision was made mainly for political purposes.

In 1979 it was decided to use the Class 111 for the S-Bahn trains of the Rhein-Ruhr S-Bahn. Hence, the engines 111 111 to 111 188 were delivered in S-Bahn colours and equipped with S-Bahn gear (destination displays, e.g.). In the same year, the Intercity was reformed under the InterCity '79 scheme and the network was enlarged. As it was foreseeable that the Class 103 engines would be stressed with that workload, the 111's licence was extended to a speed of 160 kilometres per hour (99 mph), and from May 1980 onwards, the units could be found doing InterCity services.

== Accidents ==
- 111 109 was involved in an accident in the station of Wels, Austria, crashing with the ÖBB 1042 560. The driver suffered only slight bruises, however 111 109 was dismantled on-site on 29 August 1981 and not rebuilt later.
- On 24 November 2006, 111 004 crashed into a truck which unlawfully turned back on a railway crossing. The locomotive was scrapped in May 2008 after reconstruction was rejected for economic reasons. Nine people were injured in this incident.
- On 3 June 2022, 111 035-2 was involved in the Garmisch-Partenkirchen train derailment. Five people were killed and 44 injured in this incident.

== Trivia ==
- The locomotive 111 111 carries the checksum 1. This is widely believed to be for cosmetic purposes only (leading to a smooth looking 111 111-1 inscription); however the checksum is correct.
- 111 030 was the first of the series featuring an advertising livery, advertising the musical Tanz der Vampire (Dance of the Vampires) in 2002.
- 111 009-7 in a cream and blue livery was used for a 1:87 scale model by Roco.
- A drawing of a Class 111 locomotive appeared on the cover of the Thomas Cook Continental Timetable for 12 years, starting in 1976 and continuing through 1987.

== Gallery ==
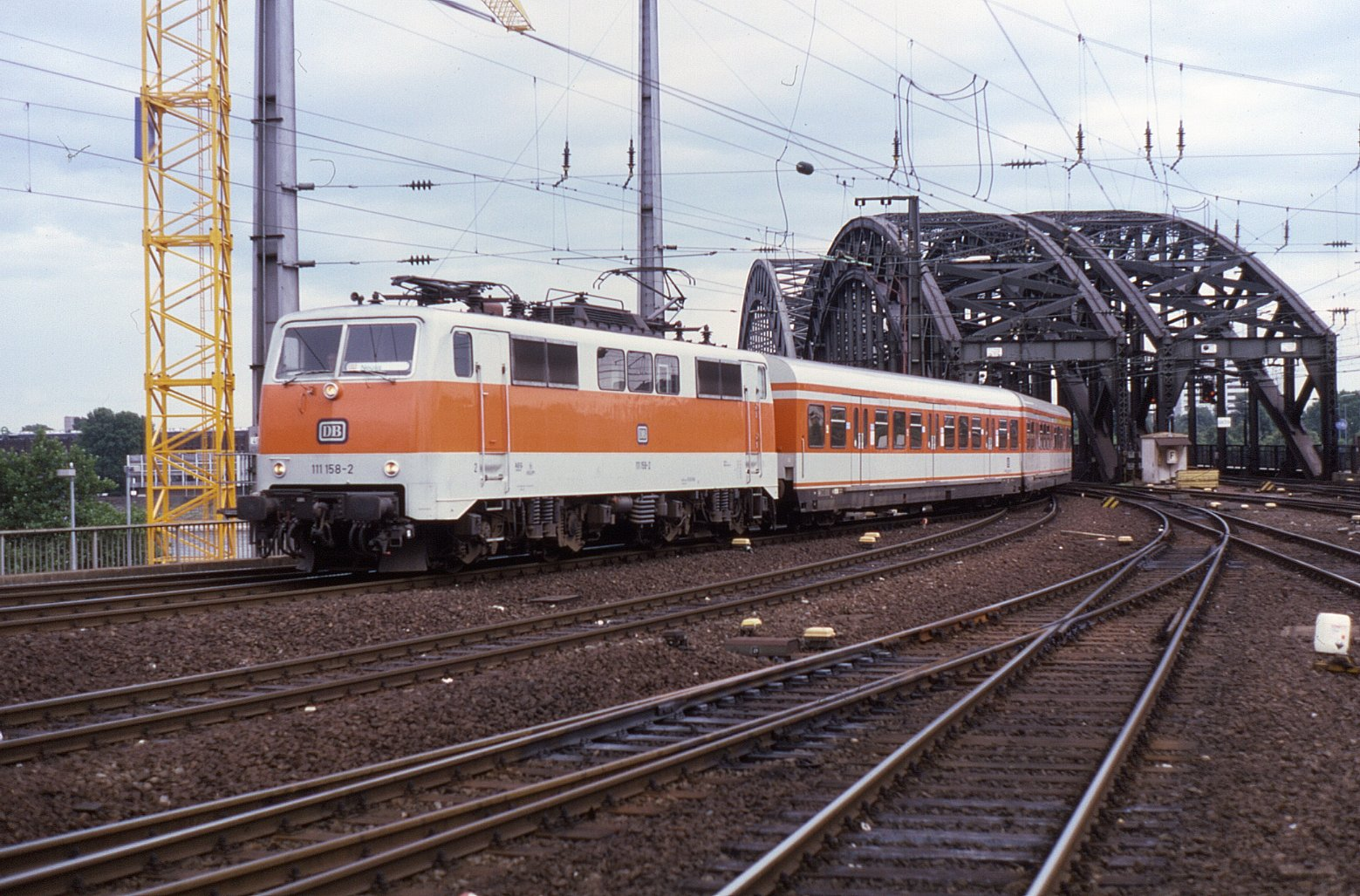
Deutsche Bundesbahn 111 158 with orange and white Rhine-Ruhr S-Bahn livery at Köln Hbf in 1985

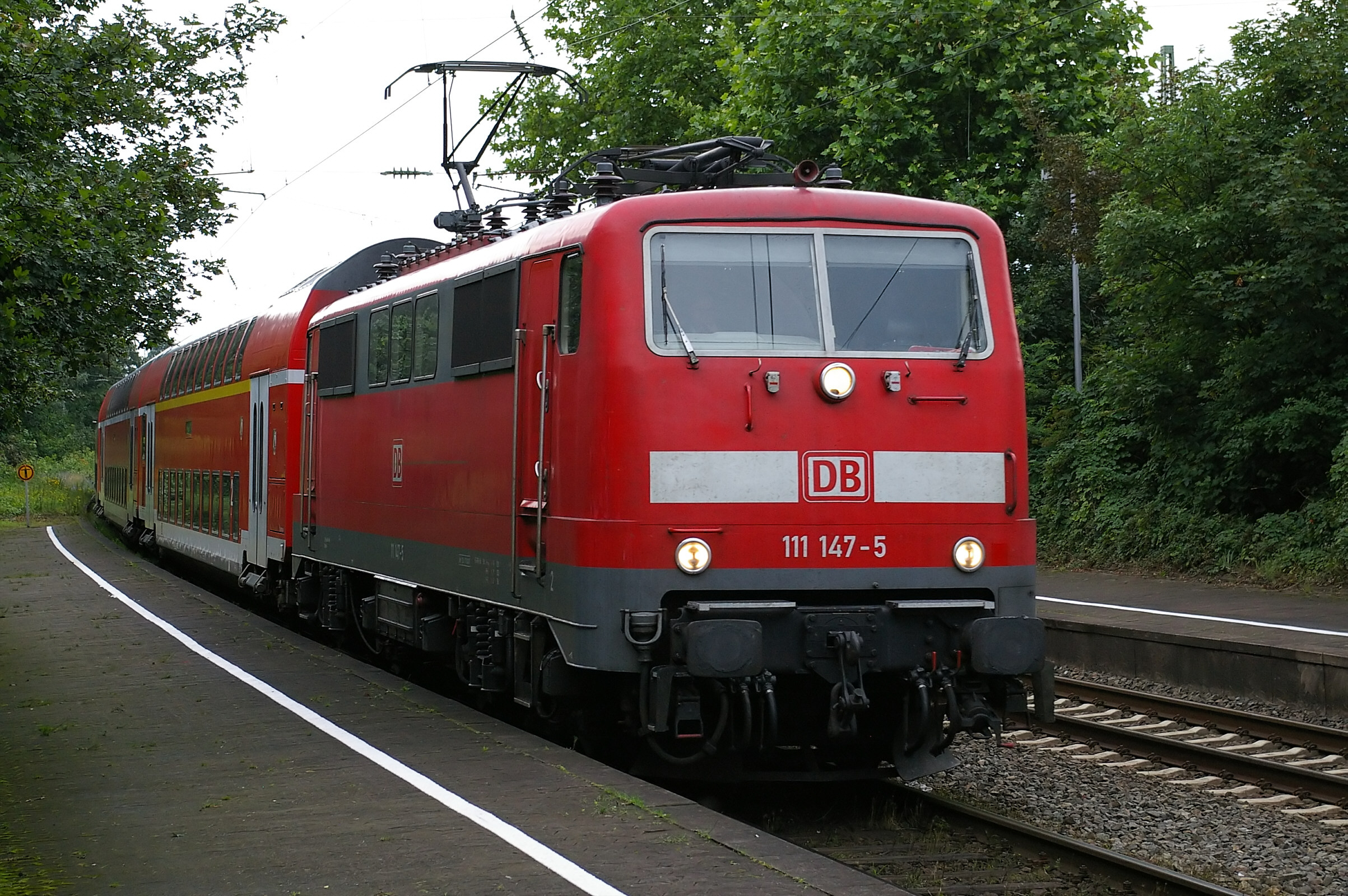
DB 111 147 at Castrop-Rauxel in July 2007

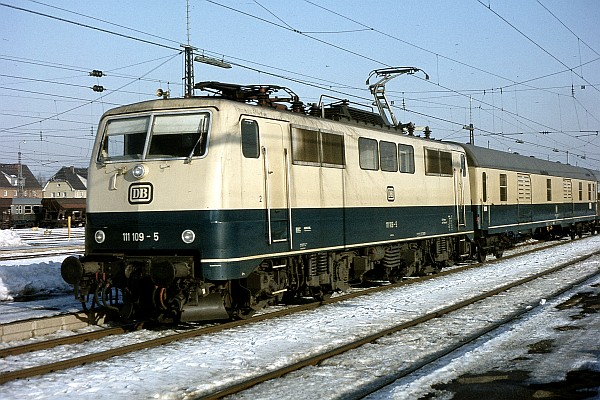
Deutsche Bundesbahn 111 109 at Freilassing in 1981

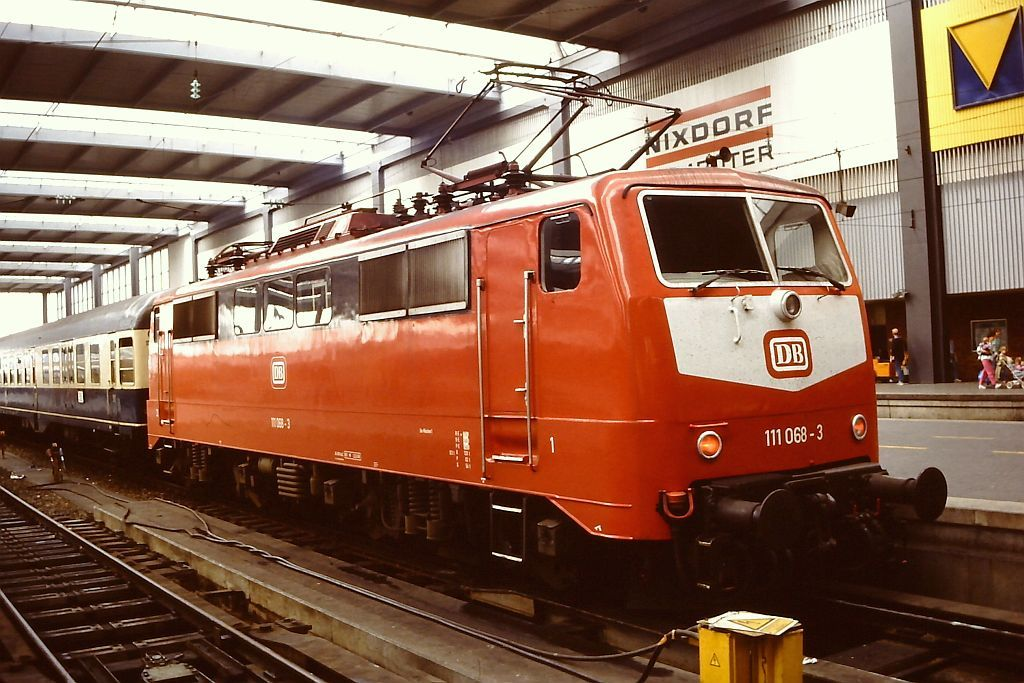
Deutsche Bundesbahn 111 068 at Munich Hauptbahnhof in 1989

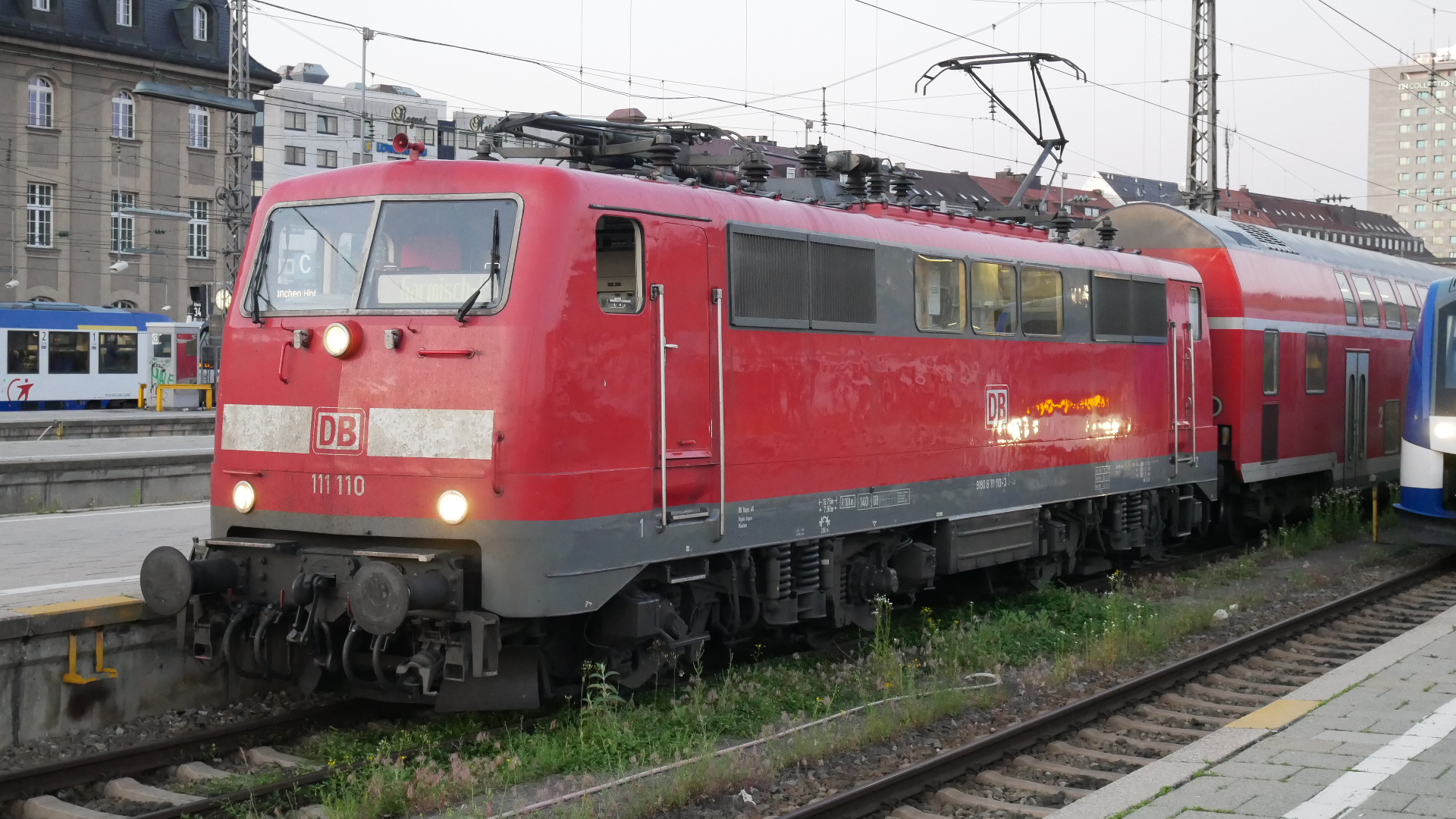
DB 111 110 at Munich Hauptbahnhof in June 2023.

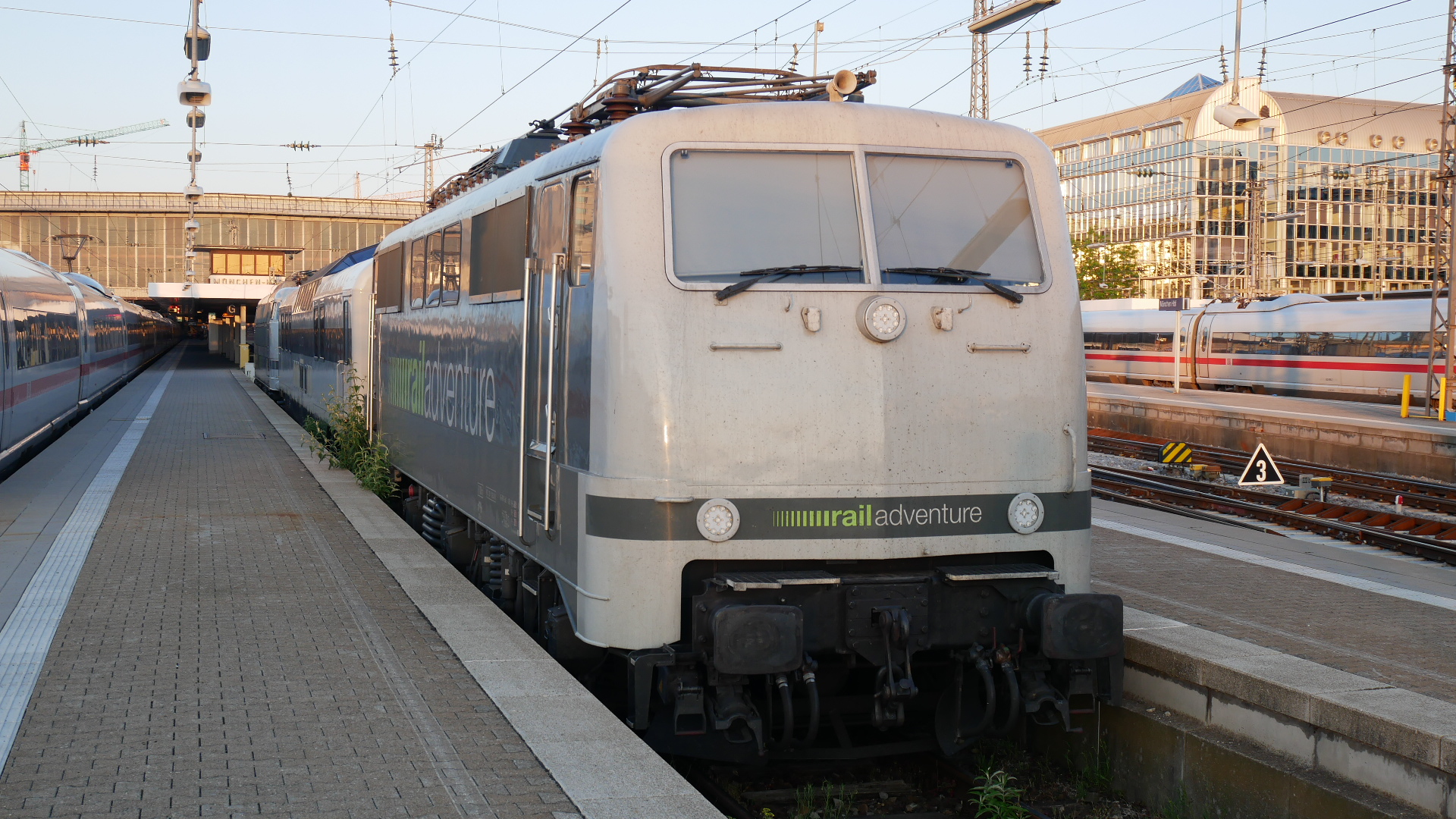
A RailAdventure DB Class 111.

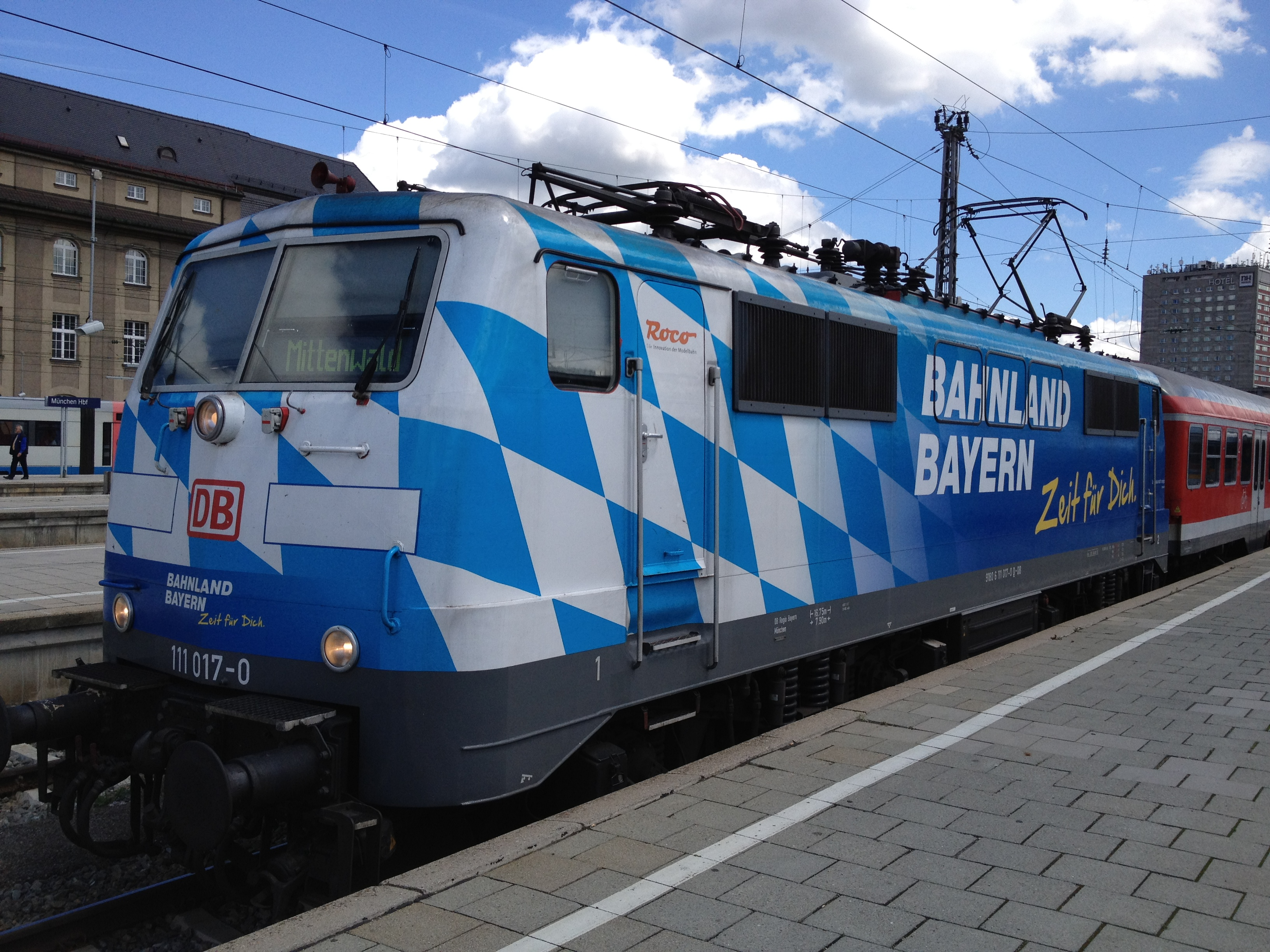
DB 111 017 with special paintwork "Bahnland Bayern" at Munich Hauptbahnhof in June 2012

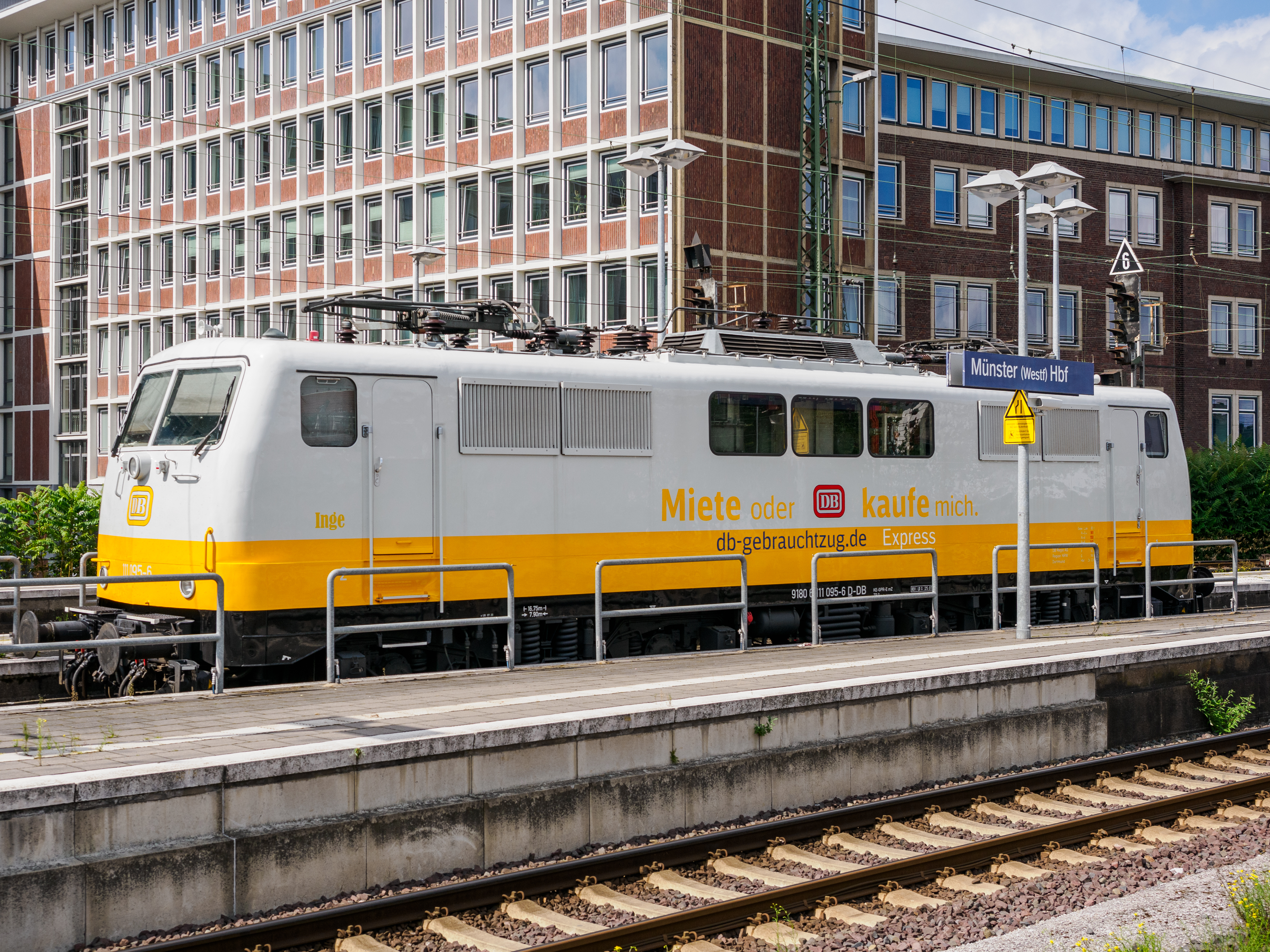
DB 111 095 "Inge": to buy or to rent (2024)
