= DB Class E 40 =

Class of German electric locomotives

Deutsche Bundesbahn E 40
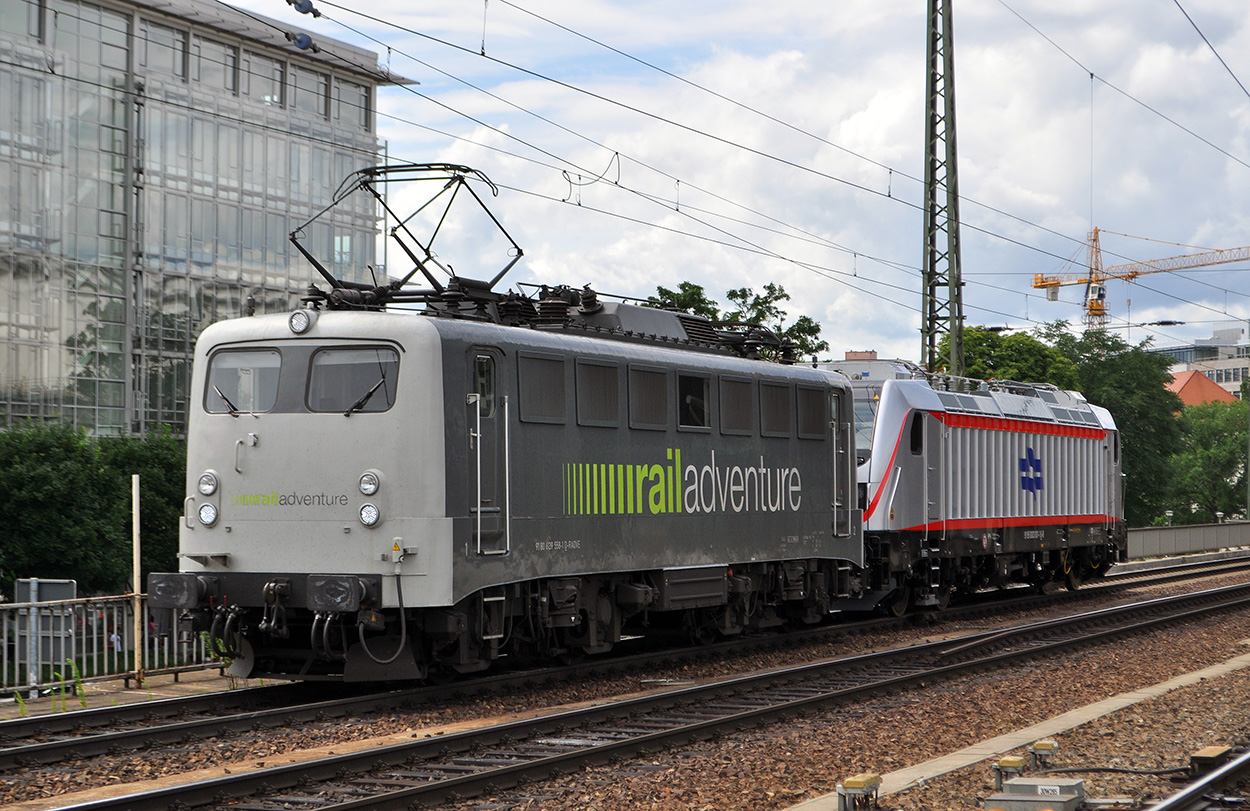
- 139 558-1 of RailAdventure at Dresden Hbf with Israel Railways' Bombardier Traxx locomotive, 1 June 2017
Type and origin
- Power type: electric
- Builder: Krupp, Henschel, Krauss-Maffei, Siemens, AEG, BBC
- Build date: 21 March 1957–17 August 1973 (E40.11/139: 1959,1965)
- Total produced: 879
Specifications
- Configuration
  - UIC: Bo′Bo′
- Gauge: 1,435 mm (4 ft 8 1/2 in) standard gauge
- Length: 16.49 m (54 ft 1 1/4 in)
- Loco weight: 83 tonnes (81.7 long tons; 91.5 short tons)
- Electric system/s: 15 kV 16.7 Hz Catenary
- Traction motors: Four
- Loco brake: K-GP mZ, electric brakes (Class 139 only)
- Train brakes: Air
- Safety systems: Sifa, PZB
Performance figures
- Maximum speed: 100 km/h (62 mph) later (110 km/h (68 mph))
- Power output: 3,700 kW (5,000 hp)
- Tractive effort: 275 kN (62,000 lbf)
Career
- Operators: Deutsche Bundesbahn; Deutsche Bahn
- Class: E40 / E40.11 (from 1968: 140 / 139)

The Baureihe E 40 is a German Standard electric locomotive (German: Einheits-Elektrolokomotive) commissioned by the Deutsche Bundesbahn in 1955, designed for freight trains. Since the 1968 renumbering, it is listed as Class 140 and Class 139.

== Development ==
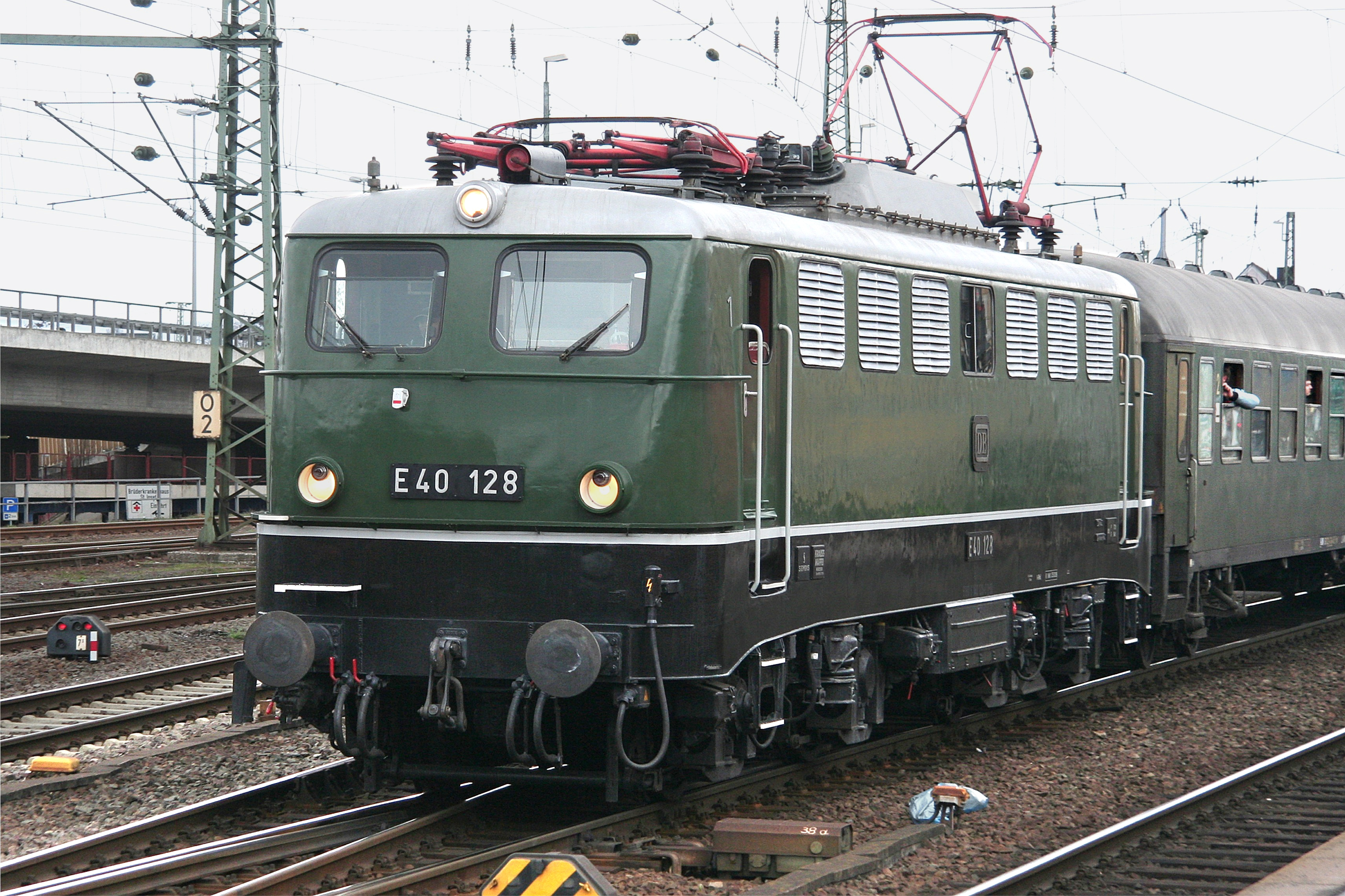
Locomotive E 40 128

In 1950, the Deutsche Bundesbahn introduced two general types of electric locomotives with standardised components: A twelve-wheel (UIC: Co′Co′) freight train locomotive as successor for the class E 94 and an eight-wheel (UIC: Bo′Bo′) general purpose electric locomotive as successor for the class E 44. A new feature was that the driver was seated, whereas formerly they had to stand.

During the construction period the speed requirement for a general purpose locomotive (working title E 46, then changed to class E 10) was increased to that point that the layout was one for an express train locomotive. Two types were not found sufficient to cover all needs, so the Einheits-Elektrolokomotiven program was changed to four general types: Light passenger train locomotive (class E 41), express train locomotive (class E 10), freight train locomotive class E 40 and heavy freight train locomotive (class E 50). All four classes were designed to share as many components as possible.

== Production and design of Class E 40 ==
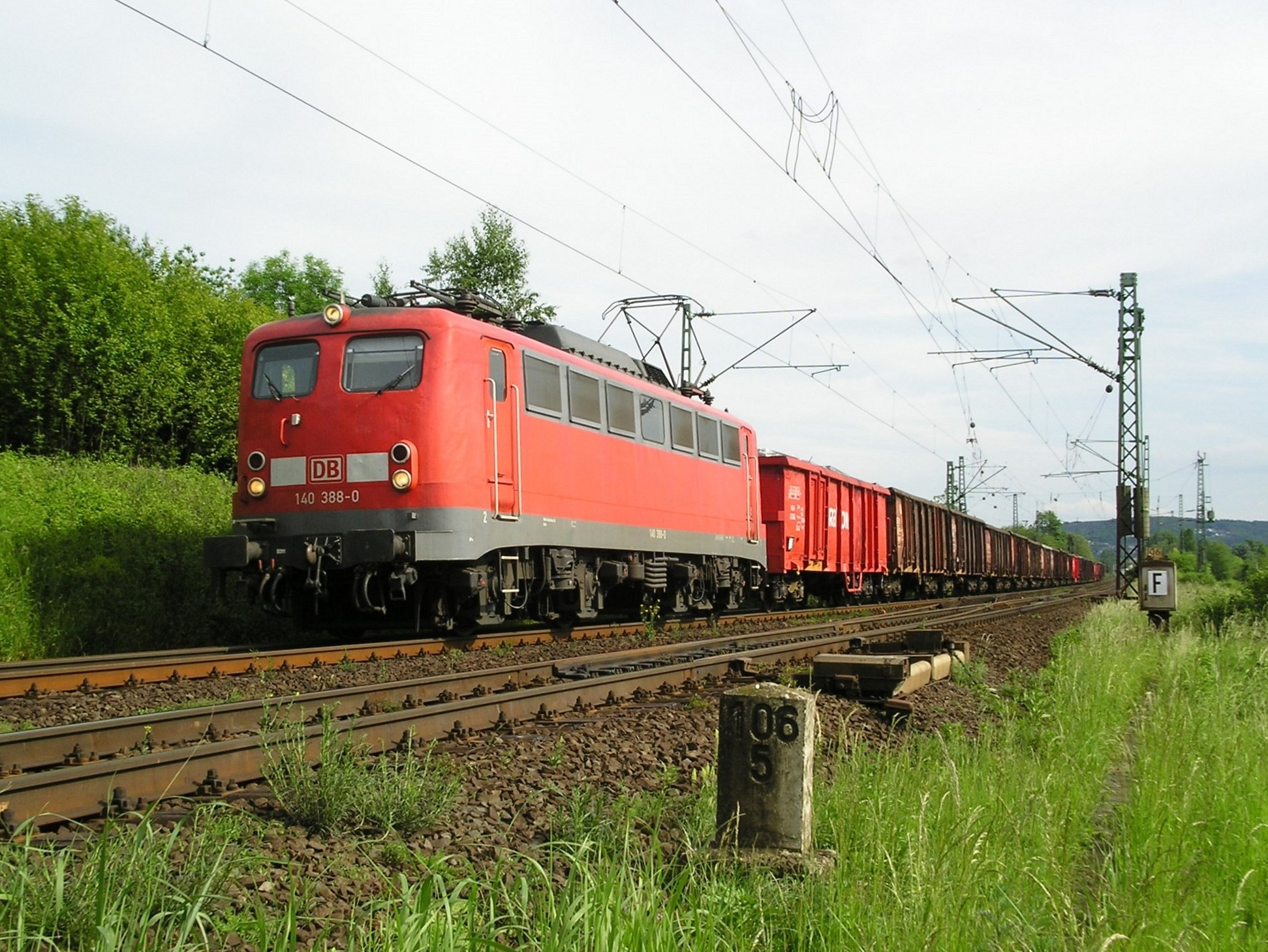
A BR 140 with a freight train north of Unkel in 2005.

The class E 40 basically is a class E 10 without electric brake, altered gear ratio for lower speed and correspondingly higher tractive effort along with additional minor changes.

As all other types of the Einheitslokomotiven program the class E 40 had welded bogies with central pins. Instead the formerly used axle hung motors it used a quill drive with a circular rubber spring as a connecting element ("Gummiringfeder" in German) reducing unsprung mass. The control unit had 28 power settings.

879 units were built, making it the Einheitslokomotive (standard locomotive) of its era.

The original speed was 100 km/h, this was enhanced to 110 km/h in 1969 in order to allow better usability also for commuter trains. A sub-series, known as 140.8, were equipped for push-pull train operation.

In 1968 class E 40 was renumbered to class 140.

== Subclass E 40.11 ==
Starting in 1959, 31 locomotives were equipped with electrical brakes (as all class E 10 units were) for the ramp near Erkrath-Hochdahl between Düsseldorf and Wuppertal and the Höllentalbahn in southern Germany. Nowadays these engines are in service around Munich, with recent services to Austria, where the electric brake is very useful. In the beginning of the 1990s some additional class 139 (as they were renumbered in 1968) were built by equipping class 110 units with class 140 bogies and gearboxes from class 110 units pulled out of service.

Both class 140 and class 139 are being replaced by newer constructions such as class 145, class 185 and class 189. It is widely expected that the last units will be scrapped before 2010, though the higher than expected increase in railway freight traffic has created some traction shortages, thus some class 140 units are being overhauled.
