= E2E =

E2E or e2e may refer to:

- BTB E2E, a class of Swiss electric locomotives
- End-to-end (disambiguation)
- Estradiol enantate, an estrogen medication
- Speedtwin E2E Comet 1, a British light aircraft
