= Einheitslokomotive =

Einheitslokomotive ("standard locomotive") may refer to:

- Einheitsdampflokomotive, steam locomotives built under the direction of the Deutsche Reichsbahn-Gesellschaft from 1925
- Einheits-Elektrolokomotive, built for the Deutsche Bundesbahn after World War 2

== See also ==
- History of rail transport in Germany
