= DB Class E 10 =

German electric locomotive class

Deutsche Bundesbahn Baureihe E 10
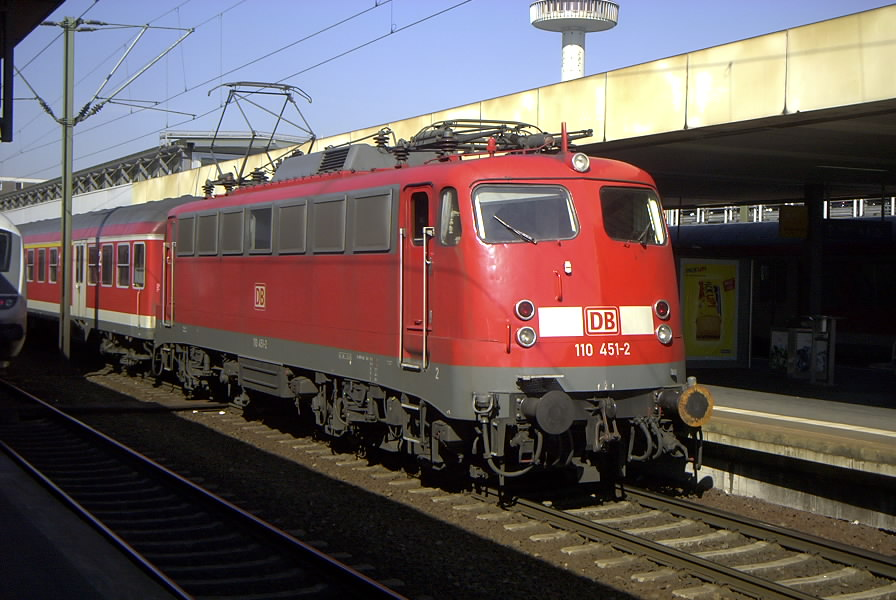
- 110 451-2 with a Regionalexpress at Hannover Hauptbahnhof, 2003-03-18
Type and origin
- Power type: Electric
- Builder: Krupp, Henschel, Krauss-Maffei (mechanical parts) Siemens, AEG, BBC (electrical parts)
- Build date: 1956–1969
- Total produced: 416 (5 E10.0 (pre-series); 379 E10; 31 E10.12; 1 conversion from series 139)
Specifications
- Configuration
  - UIC: Bo′Bo′
- Gauge: 1,435 mm (4 ft 8 1/2 in) standard gauge
- Length: 16.49 m (54 ft 1 in)
- Loco weight: 85 tonnes (84 long tons; 94 short tons)
- Electric system/s: 15 kV 16.7 Hz AC Catenary
- Current pickup: Pantograph
- Traction motors: Four
- Loco brake: K-GP mZ, electric brakes
- Train brakes: Air
- Safety systems: Sifa, PZB
Performance figures
- Maximum speed: series 110: 150 km/h (93 mph) (later 140 km/h (87 mph)) series 113: 160 km/h (99 mph) (sometimes 120 km/h (75 mph)) series 114: 160 km/h (99 mph) (later 120 km/h (75 mph))
- Power output: 3,700 kW (5,000 hp)
- Tractive effort: 275 kN (62,000 lbf)
Career
- Operators: Deutsche Bundesbahn; Deutsche Bahn AG
- Class: Baureihe E10 (110 from 1968); Baureihe E10.12 (112 from 1968)
- Retired: Commenced in 2000 (mainly series 110.1, and 110.3 that were unable to be used in push/pull service)

The class E 10 is an electric locomotive of the Deutsche Bundesbahn, introduced in 1952. It belongs to the Einheits-Elektrolokomotiven (standardised electric locomotives) program and was built for express passenger service. In 1968 the series was redesignated as class 110 (E10) and class 112 (E10.12). In 1988 the last series of class 112 locomotives were designated as class 114, and in 1991 the remaining locomotives of class 112 were designated as class 113. In 2006 38 locomotives were designated as class 115.

Until 2020, individual locomotives of the 115 series were used for "special passenger trains". All locomotives of this series have now been retired from regular service by DB, but some are still in active use by private railway companies.

== Development history ==
In 1950, the Deutsche Bundesbahn decided to develop two base types of electric locomotives with largely standardised components: A twelve-wheel (UIC: Co'Co') freight train locomotive as successor for the Class E 94, and an eight-wheel (UIC: Bo'Bo') general purpose electric locomotive as successor for the Class E 44. As a new feature the engineers should be able to be seated, whereas formerly they had to stand in order to boost their attentiveness.

This multi-purpose locomotive received the working title E 46, but was then renamed to Class E 10, once the required maximum speed was increased from 125 to 130 km/h (78 to 81 mph), which formally made this model an express train locomotive. The trial program, which consisted of 5 prototypes of class E 10.0, resulted in the realization that a single uniform type of electric locomotive was not sufficient to cover all needs. The modified program then included a local passenger train locomotive (class E 41); an express train locomotive (class E 10), which could be changed into a freight train locomotive (Class E 40) with a gear ratio change, and a heavy six-axle freight train locomotive (class E 50). In addition plans for a high speed electric locomotive Class E 01 were made, but quickly cancelled, as, due to low maximum speeds on the main lines at that time, the class E 10 was seen as sufficient for express trains.

== Production of class E 10 ==
The five prototypes of class E 10.0 were taken out of service between 1975 and 1978. Of these E 10 003 and E 10 005 were preserved as museum locomotives.

The first serial units went into service in 1956 and started with number E 10 101 (class E 10.1). As opposed to class E 40 these units were equipped with a rheostatic/regenerative brake, which also accounted for the difference in the roof design between the two classes. Starting in December 1956 a total of 379 locomotives in several series were delivered by the manufacturers (Krupp, Henschel, Krauss-Maffei (mechanical parts); Siemens, AEG, BBC (electrical parts). Starting with E 10 288 the new body created for E 10.12 (see below), the so-called "crease" (Bügelfalte) type, was also applied to new-production E 10 machines. Thereafter these locomotives were sometimes designated as class E 10.3. One locomotive (designated 751 001, former 110 385) served as a service locomotive for the Central Office of the German Federal Railways in Minden (BZA Minden, or Bahnzentralamt) from 1989 to 1996. The earlier units up to E10 287 became E10.1, then 110.1 in 1968; they were nicknamed "Kasten", for box.

The service spectrum of the (since 1968 as class 110 designated) locomotives was shifted more and more to local/regional service by the 1990s. As part of this shift, during the third stage of the Bahn reform program the locomotives were assigned to the local service branch DB Regio, which practically meant the end of their service in the express area. In order to use the machines more efficiently in regional service, from 1997 many of the units were equipped with push-pull train controls, partly using components of class 140 and class 141 units that were retired.

Originally the class E 10 units were delivered in cobalt blue express train livery, the blue indicating that they were cleared for a maximum speed of 140 km/h (87 mph) or more. Starting in 1974, as part of other maintenance, the new ocean blue/beige colour scheme was applied to the locomotives. From 1987 the (then-current) orient-red was used, which was then substituted, starting in 1997, with the traffic red (verkehrsrot) concept, which is the current colour of all active locomotives of this class, barring a few exceptions.

== Construction ==
As all other types of the Einheitslokomotiven program, the class E 10 / class 110 had 2-axle pivoted bogies/trucks as welded box construction with pivot pins, and welded superstructure with fan grills. The class 110.3 used the body of the E 10.12 with the pulled-forward frontal area, also called the “crease” (Bügelfalte). The frame is propped up over the bogies by coil springs and rubber elements. Originally a bumpy ride at higher speeds was noticeable, which required repeated rework of the bogies. In two locomotives (110 475 and 476) a flexicoil suspension was tested.

All locomotives feature an indirect air brake manufactured by Knorr, with automatically stronger braking action at high speeds; for shunting/switching service an additional direct brake is present. All units also feature a separately excited rheostatic/regenerative brake, which is coupled to the air brake. The heat generated by the electric brakes is dissipated via roof exhausts. For the first time in German locomotives high voltage regulation of the transformer was used in serial production.

The traction motors are 14-pole motors of type WB 372, which were later again used in class 111 and 151. As was the case in all locomotives in the Einheitslokomotiven program, the rubber ring transmission system made by the Siemens-Schuckert-Werke/SSW was utilized, which had proven themselves above all expectations in the prototype E 10.0 units.

On the roof are found scissor (double-arm) pantographs of the type DBS 54a, standardized for all Einheits classes, mounted on the obligatory roof insulators, as well as the compressed air main switch and the current-to-voltage converter for the monitoring of the overhead wire voltage. The 3-core transformers are oil-cooled, to which the control unit with its 28 running steps is connected. The acceleration is designed to function in delayed mode, where the engineer chooses the running step, and the control unit will initiate the chosen setting independently. For emergency operation manual control by hand crank is possible. Many locomotives feature thyristor load diverters.

The safety equipment in the driver's cab features either a mechanical or electronic deadman's device, punctiform automatic train controls (now compliant with the new regulations with software version PZB 90), and train radio equipment with GSM-R communication. Relatively recently computers were added for the electronic timetable EBuLa, as well as the automatic door locking at 0 km/h (TB0), which has become a compulsory requirement for all locomotives in passenger service. A few units have also been equipped with computers for the control system CIR-ELKE.

== Variants ==
=== Class E 10.12 / class 112 (1962-1991) ===
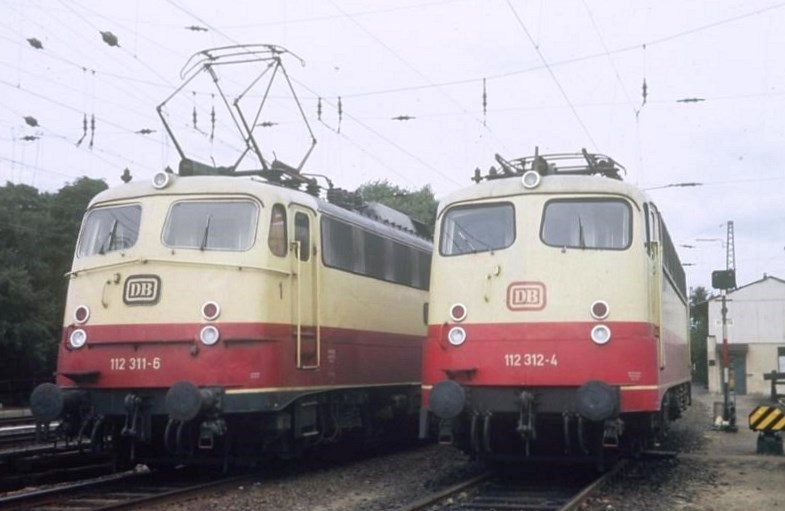
DB Class 112 engines in Hamburg 1984

During production some E 10 units were equipped with newly developed Henschel-made bogies and transmissions fit for speeds up to 160 km/h, and starting in 1962-63 they pulled long-distance express trains such as the Rheingold, and were classified as class E 10.12 (and from 1968 designated as class 112). In addition these locomotives introduced the more aerodynamic superstructure (the "crease", or Bügelfalte), which was used for all new units of the class E 10, starting with E 10 288. In order to differentiate these units from the "normal" E 10s, a "1" (indicating a sub-class) was placed in front of the running number. In this way the E 10 1265-1270 were established, which became the eponym for the class description of E 10.12. In 1963-64 came E 10 1308-1312, again with Henschel-made high-speed bogies, primarily for the Rheinpfeil.

Neither group of E10.12 locomotives was ready in time for the launch of the trains for which they were ordered. Pending their delivery, 2 separate groups of E10.1 locomotives (E10 239-244 in 1962-63, and E10 250-254 in 1963-64) were temporarily modified for 160 km/h service, with only E10 244 and E10 250-254 receiving the Henschel bogies. However, all would gain the prefix 1 to their running numbers, the modified 160 km/h gear ratios, and the appropriate paint scheme. All were later restored to normal E10.1 standards.

Finally, in 1968, came 112 485, already designated as class 112, which did not have the expensive Henschel bogies, but featured modified serial-production bogies.

=== Class 113 (1991-today) ===
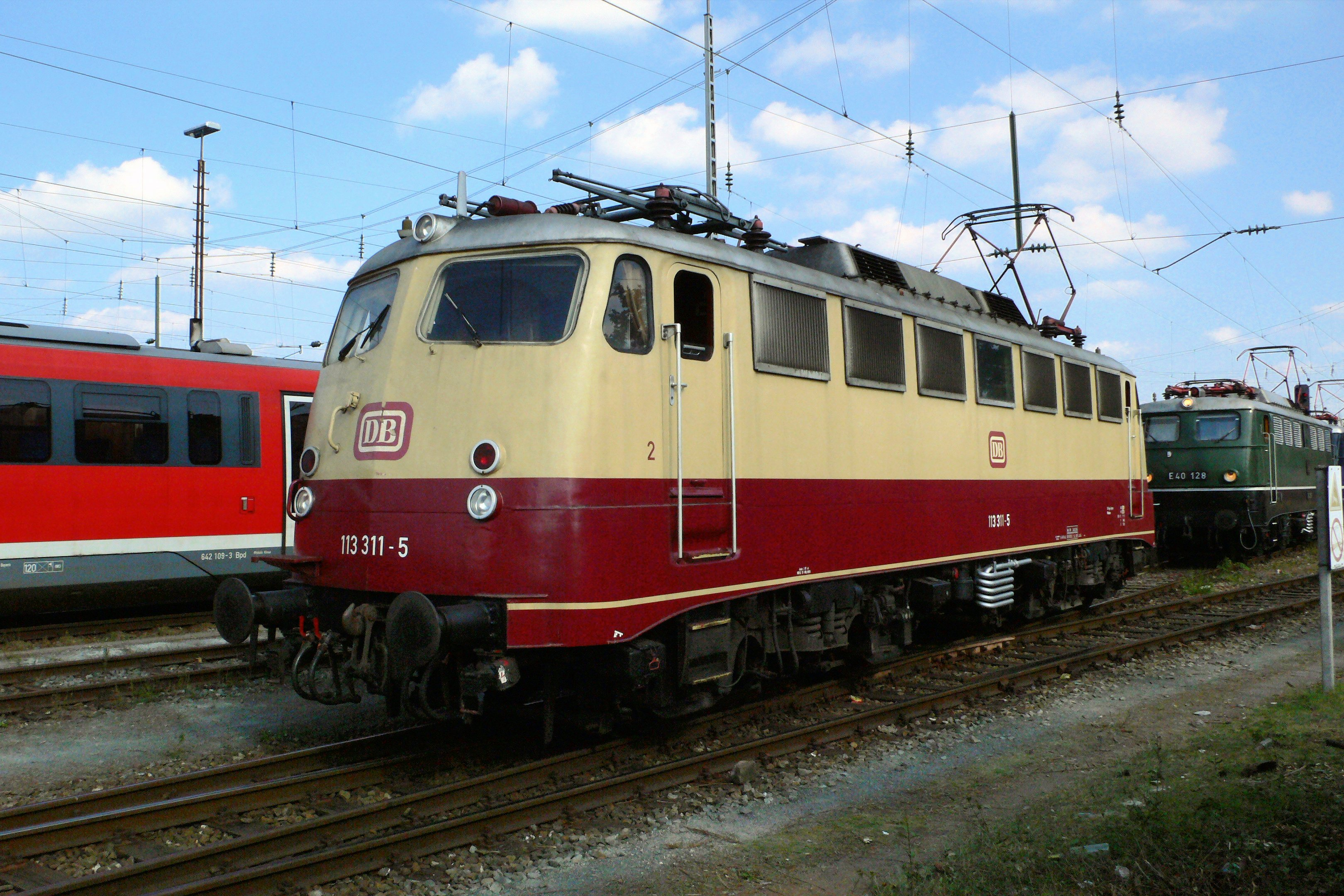
DB Class 113 locomotive

By 1991 it had become clear that the deployment of the 11 locomotives of the first two series of class 112 in heavy and fast service had taken its toll. Several gear wheel malfunctions during service caused heavy damage to motor and transmission of the affected units. The maximum speed was reduced to 120 km/h (75 mph) as an emergency measure, and the locomotives were only utilized as express trains in the Munich area. At the time they were already re-designated as class 113, in order to free up the designation of class 112 in the new German number scheme (for the more numerous and modern class 212 locomotives of the former Deutsche Reichsbahn (East Germany)). In the meantime these locomotives, after some units had been fitted with refurbished Henschel high-speed bogies in the mid-1990s, were able to again work at the speed of 160 km/h, but were considered not to be much better than the normal class 110 units, and were soon listed for impending retirement.

=== Class 114 (1988-1995) ===
Class 114 is made up of 20 re-designated units from the third series of class 112, which were capable of speeds up to 160 km/h, and ran on modified bogies made for class 110 in serial production. Because of significant wear, starting in 1985 the top speed of locomotives with numbers 112 485-504 was reduced to 140 km/h (87 mph). To differentiate these units from the other class 112 machines, which were still allowed to travel at 160 km/h (99 mph), they were designated as class 114 from 1988 on. Further conspicuous issues on and around the bogies continued to be noticed even after the speed reduction, and the locomotives were first further slowed down to 120 km/h (75 mph), and retired altogether soon thereafter.

Starting in 1993, using bogies from class 110 units with numbers 110 287 and lower, all 20 of the class 114 locomotives were rebuilt as normal class 110.3 units and were inserted into inventory as 110 485-504. 18 of the class 110, which lost their bogies to these "new" 110s, were rebuilt with bogies from retired class 140 locomotives, and were re-designated as members of class 139, with which class they were nearly identical in the first place, due to their electric brake system. (The 2 remaining former class 114s received bogies from 2 other retired class 110.3 units). The concept of the Einheitslokomotive completely paid for itself in this swap exercise.

=== Class 115 - since 2005 ===
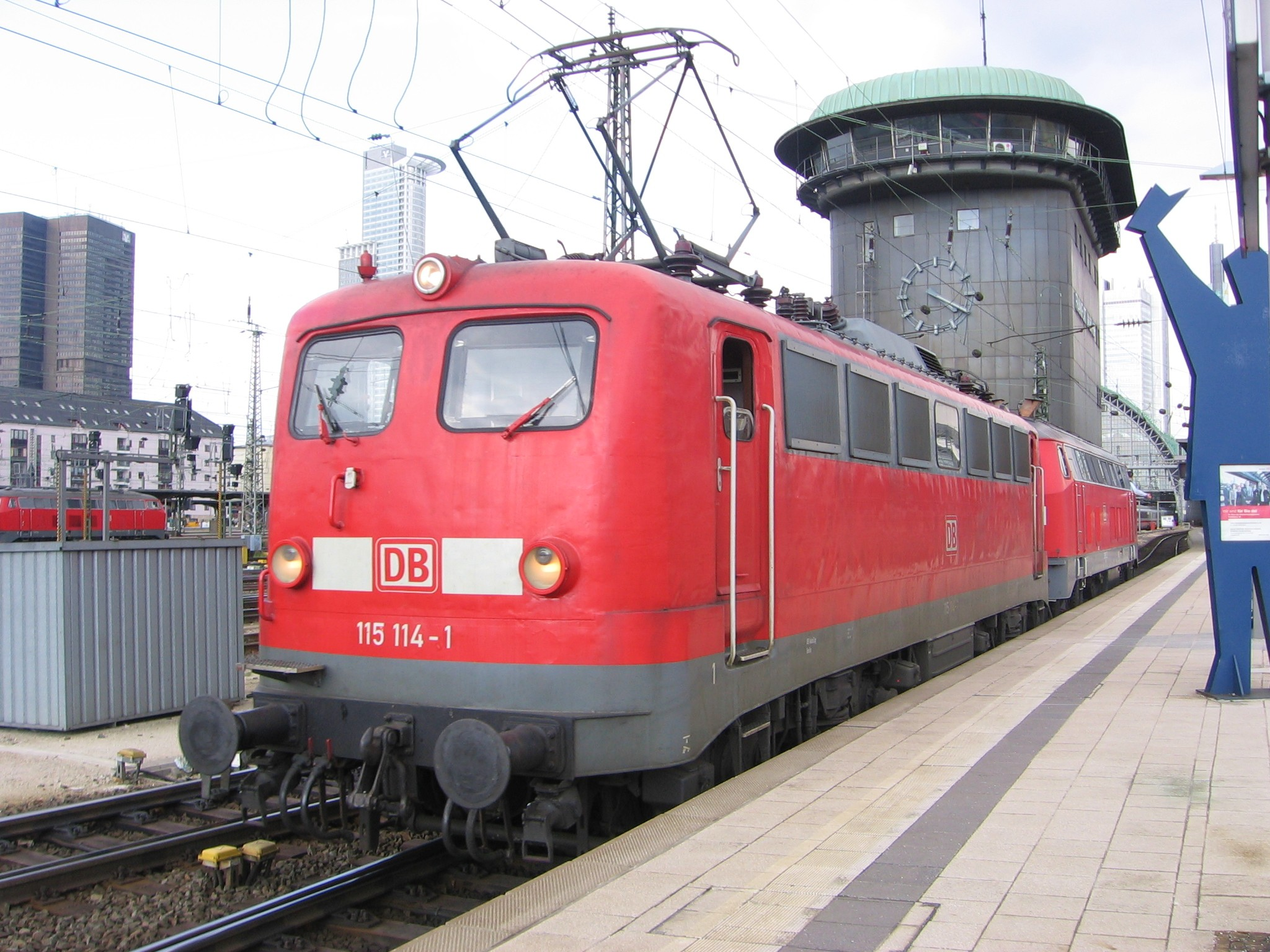
DB Class 115 in Frankfurt

Starting in 2005 a few former class 110 and class 113 units were transferred from DB Regio to DB Autozug, the DB subsidiary for express passenger service with car transportation. In order to differentiate these units, they are slowly being renumbered to class 115, and are being relocated to Berlin-Rummelsburg. These locomotives are thereby the first units of this class to be domiciled in the former East Germany.

The Class 115 hosts one of the oldest locomotives still in regular passenger service in Germany. 115 114-1 (pictured in 2006 on the left) was introduced on 21 November 1957, and is used on various InterCity services across Germany.

== Literature ==
- Roland Hertwig: Die Baureihe E 10. Entstehung, Technik und Einsatzgeschichte. Ek-Verlag, Freiburg 2006, ISBN 3-88255-171-2
- F. Moritz: Baureihe 110. Im Führerstand. In: LOK MAGAZIN. Nr. 252/Jahrgang 41/2002. GeraNova Zeitschriftenverlag GmbH München, ISSN 0458-1822, S. 49-51.
