= BTB E2E =

Swiss electric locomotive

E2E
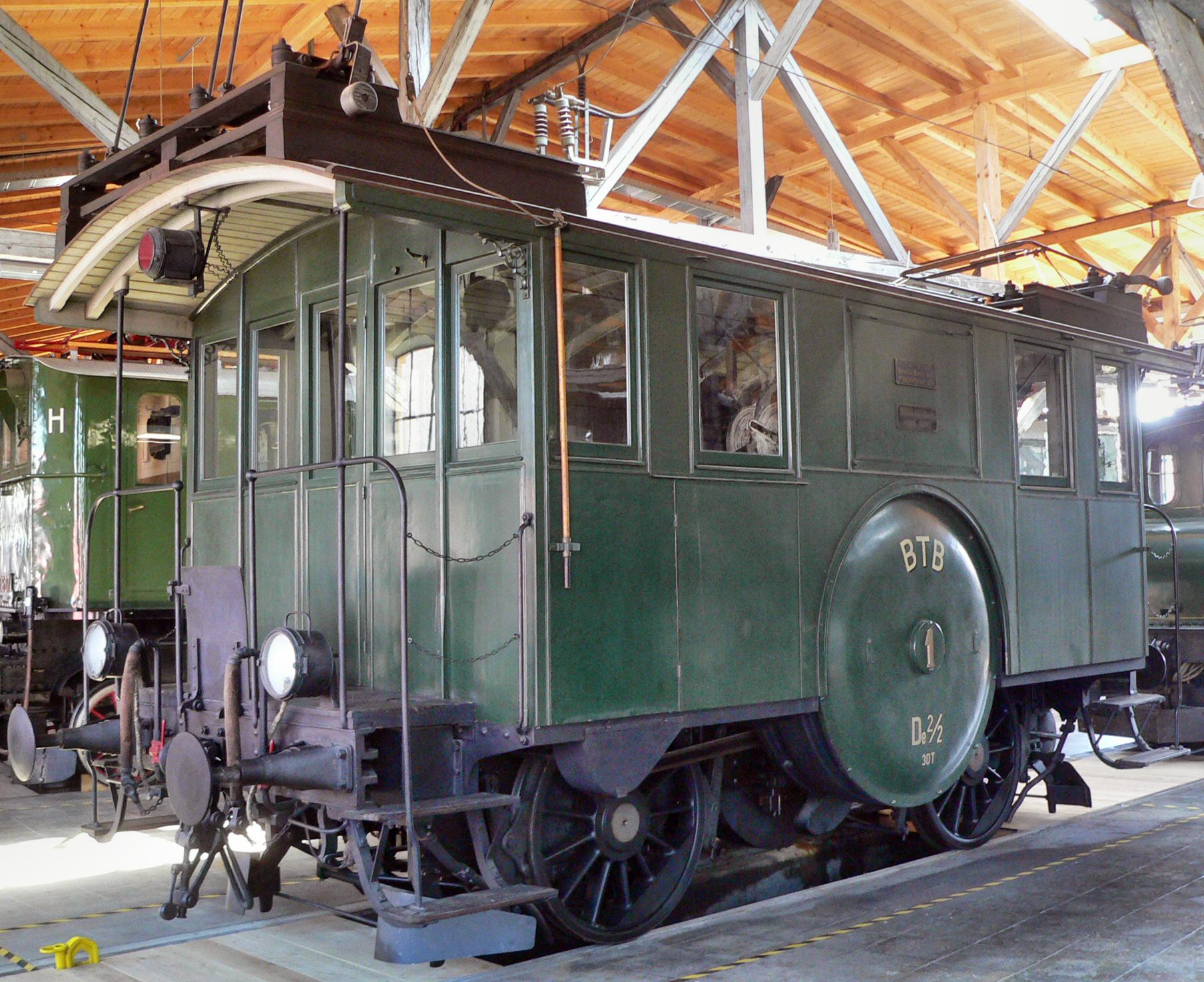
- E2E No 1 at Freilassing Locomotive World, Germany
Type and origin
- Power type: Electric
- Builder: BBC/SLM
- Build date: 1899
- Total produced: 2
Specifications
- Configuration
  - UIC: B
- Gauge: 1,435 mm (4 ft 8 1/2 in)
- Wheel diameter: 1,230 mm (4 ft 0 in)
- Wheelbase: 3,140 mm (10 ft 4 in)
- Length: 7,800 mm (25 ft 7 in) over buffers
- Loco weight: 29.6 tonnes (29.1 long tons; 32.6 short tons)
- Electric system/s: 750V AC Catenary
- Current pickup(s): Pantograph
- Traction motors: Two
- Train brakes: Air
Performance figures
- Maximum speed: 50 km/h (31 mph)
- Power output: One hour: 220 kW (300 hp)
Career
- Operators: BTB
- Delivered: 1899
- Retired: 1930
- Preserved: 2

The BTB E2E, also known as F 2/2 and De 2/2, were a pair of Swiss electric locomotives operated by Burgdorf Thun Bahn (BTB) in the early twentieth century. They are the oldest three phase locomotives designed for full service operation that have been preserved. The locomotives were built by Brown, Boveri & Cie (BBC) and Schweizerische Lokomotiv- und Maschinenfabrik (SLM) and entered service in 1899. They were powered by two 110 kW (150 hp) 750V AC electric motors which drove two axles. A two speed gearbox enabled the locomotives to travel at 18 km/h (11 mph) and 36 km/h (22 mph), the latter for passenger transport. The gearbox was later upgraded, raising the speed to 50 km/h (31 mph). Relegated to secondary duties when more powerful designs were introduced, the locomotives provided valuable service until 1930.

== Description ==
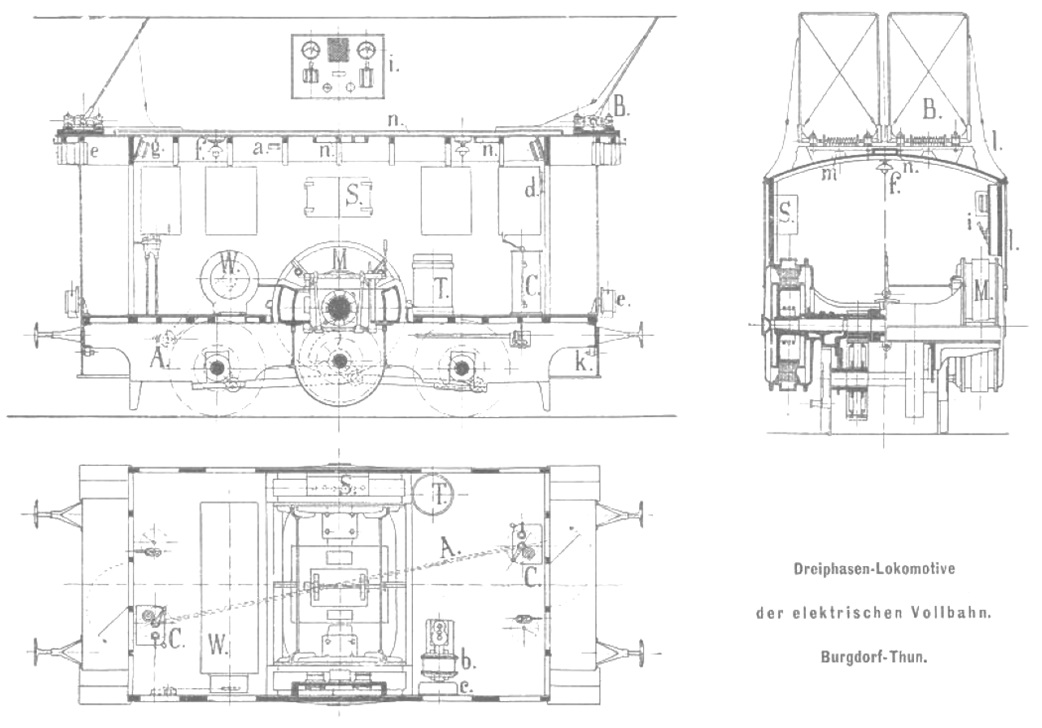
Cutaway and layout of an E2E

Constructed in Switzerland by a collaboration between Brown, Boveri & Cie (BBC), who provided the mechanics, and Schweizerische Lokomotiv- und Maschinenfabrik (SLM), who contributed the electrics, the two E2E locomotives were introduced to pull goods on the BTB. They were equipped with two 19-pole electric motors with a one hour rating of 110 kW (150 hp) which powered a common shaft mounted on an auxiliary frame. Power was transmitted via a countershaft and coupling rods to two axles to power four driving wheels. The railway operated at 750V three phase AC, which was transmitted to the locomotive via a roof-mounted pantograph and overhead wires. The locomotives were equipped with a 100 V circuit for lighting, heating and other auxiliaries.

The E2E had a wheelbase of 3,140 millimetres (10 ft 4 in) and a total length of 7,800 mm (25 ft 7 in). Weight in service was 29.6 tonnes (29.1 long tons; 32.6 short tons). A driving cab with simple controls, including air brakes, was fitted to one end of the superstructure. A two speed gearbox, switchable when the locomotive was stationary, was fitted. The lower gear allowed a maximum speed of 18 km/h (11 mph) on a slope of 25 ‰ drawing a load of 100 tonnes (98 long tons; 110 short tons). The higher gear was designed for the locomotive to travel at up to 36 km/h (22 mph).

The gearbox proved to be problematic and was revised by SLM in 1900. Later, the gearing was changed to allow for a higher speed of 50 km/h (31 mph).

== Service ==
The locomotives started operating on the railway between 1899, initially designated E2E. At first, they were used mainly for freight services, but the higher gear speed also allowed the locomotives to be used for passenger operations. With the introduction of more powerful locomotives, they were relegated to secondary duties. In 1902, they were redesignated F 2/2; subsequently they were reclassified as De 2/2 in 1922. Despite their obsolescence and the limitation of the two fixed speeds, the simple engine design proved reliable and the locomotives provided good service. After just over thirty years in service, they were retired in 1930.

== Preservation ==
Both locomotives have been preserved as the first three-phase locomotives in full-service operation. No. 1 is part of the collection of the Deutsches Museum at Freilassing Locomotive World. No. 2 is housed at the Swiss Museum of Transport in Lucerne.
