= Freilassing Locomotive World =

Railway museum in Freilassing, Bavaria, Germany

Coordinates: 47°50′16″N 12°57′59″E

The Freilassing Locomotive World (Lokwelt Freilassing) is a railway museum in the Berchtesgadener Land, which is operated with the cooperation of the town of Freilassing and the Deutsches Museum. The museum is located on the site of the former Freilassing locomotive shed which belongs to the Deutsche Bahn AG and houses part of the Deutsches Museum's railway collection. The second part of the collection is in the transport centre of the Deutsches Museum on the Theresienhöhe in Munich.

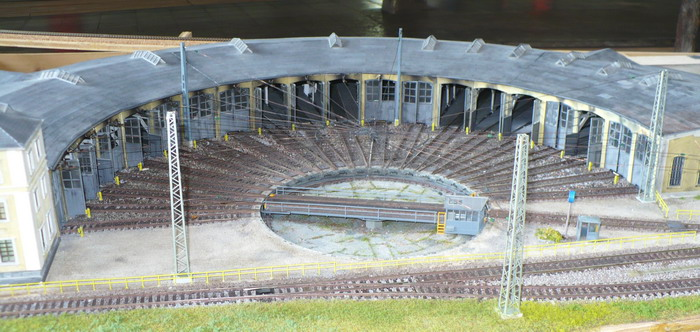
Modell des Ringlokschuppens Freilassing

== The Site ==
The locomotive shed was built between 1902 and 1905 on the railway line from Munich to Salzburg. Its facilities include a roundhouse and turntable, its own power station, workshops and equipment for the stabling and maintenance of railway vehicles and locomotives. The Deutsche Bahn AG used the site until 1994. With the closure and sale of the training workshops in 1998, the Freilassing locomotive shed era was finally over. The buildings were placed under historic building status the same year. In 2003 the town of Freilassing acquired the site with the cooperation of the Deutsches Museum's Transport Centre. The restoration and construction work for the 'Freilassing Locomotive World' museum began in autumn 2004. Almost simultaneously the society 'Friends of the Historic 1905 Freilassing Locomotive Shed' (Freunde des Historischen Lokschuppens 1905 Freilassing e.V.) was founded, and they supported the museum energetically. On 2 September 2006 the Freilassing Locomotive World was officially opened to visitors.

The roof of the building was so badly damaged by hurricane Kyrill on 18/19 January 2007 that the Locomotive World had to be temporarily closed. Meanwhile, the roof trusses were supported to ensure its stability. Even the rest of the damage was repaired sufficiently that the Locomotive World could once again be freely visited.

== Museum Project ==
On seventeen of the twenty roads of the roundhouse, numerous exhibits on the theme of 150 years of railway history are displayed. Amongst them is a large railway fleet from the Deutsches Museum, that could not be accommodated in the museum's Transport Centre site opened in 2006 due to lack of space. The move of the exhibits was reported by Bahn TV under the title A Museum Moves House. Even a few exhibits from the Nuremberg Transport Museum may be seen. The remaining three roads serve as workshops for the restoration, maintenance and care of historic locomotives and rolling stock.

A model railway layout replicates Freilassing locomotive shed at the time it was used by the Deutsche Bahn AG. For children aged 6 to 12 the Lokomotive World offers a fun park (the so-called Kinderwelt) exploring the subjects of railways and technology. On certain days there are additional presentations or campaign days. The vehicle collection is being continually added to.

== Vehicle Exhibits ==
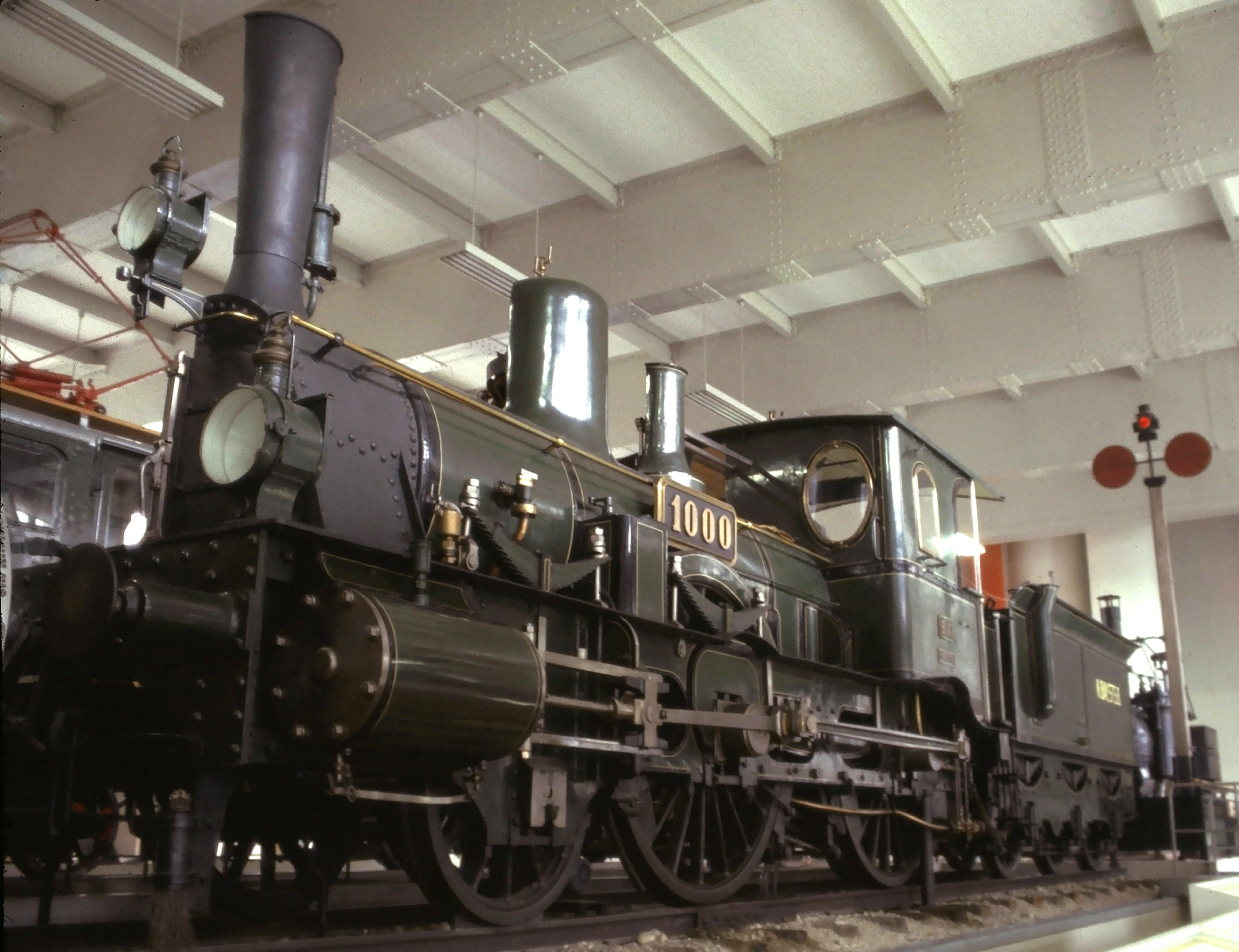
Bavarian B IX "1000" at its old location in the Deutsches Museum

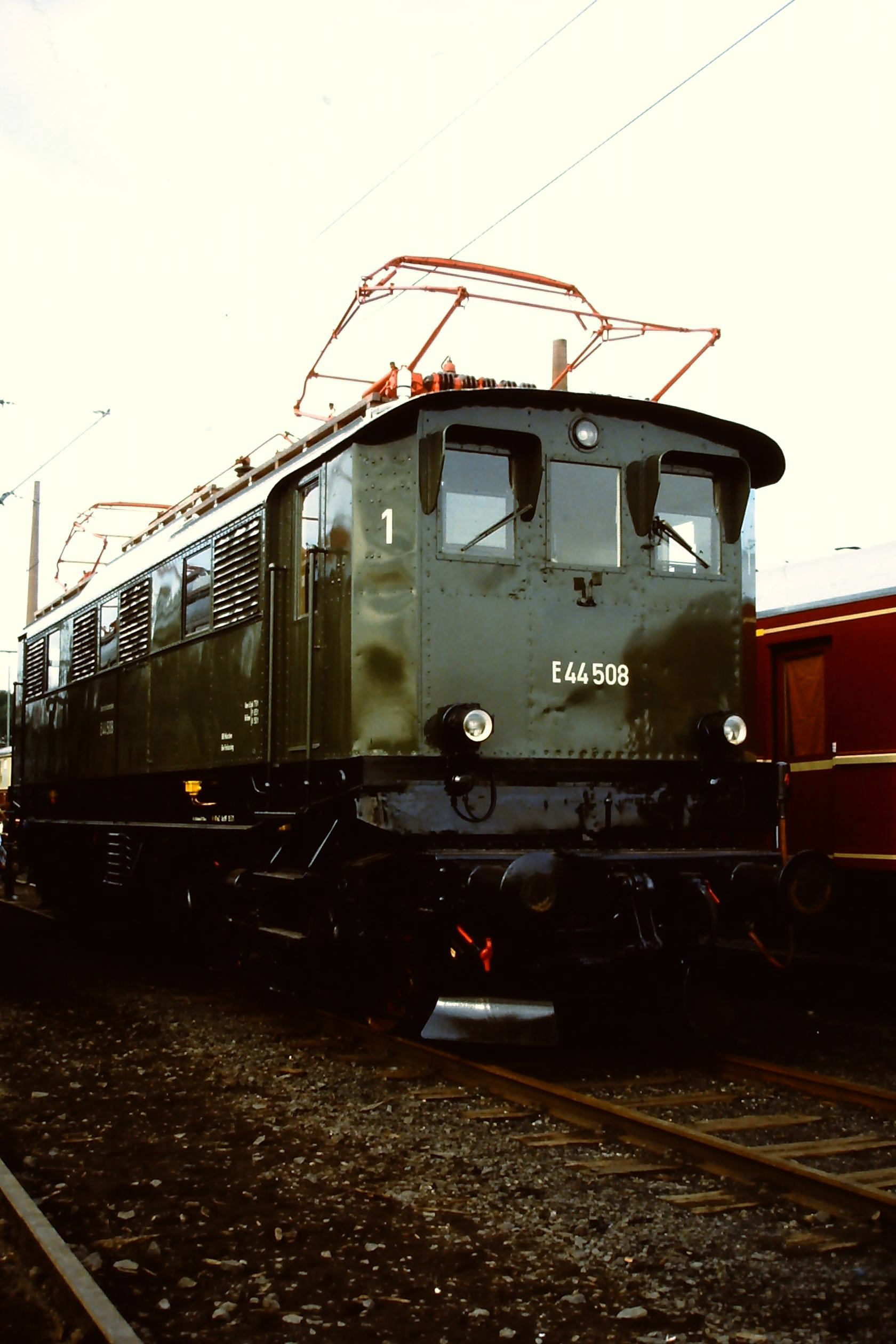
E 44 508

- Express train locomotive of Bavarian Class B IX, "1000", "Maffei" with tender
- Rack railway locomotive III No. 719 of the Bosnia & Herzegovina State Railway
- Railbus from the Wendelsteinbahn
- Rack railway locomotive Z 3 from the Schafbergbahn
- Electric goods train locomotive De 2/2
- Branch line electric locomotive LAG1
- Electric express locomotive E 1607
- Electric express locomotive E 44 (244051-9)
- Electric express locomotive 103 167
- Diesel locomotive V 140 001
- Military diesel locomotive with tipper
- Magnetic levitation vehicle with linear motor drive (Transrapid)
- 4th class railway compartment from 1870
- 2nd and 3rd class railway compartments from 1920
- DB 1st and 2nd class railway compartments from 1970
- Drive from a Class 218 diesel locomotive
- Driving axle from a Bavarian S 3/6 express locomotive
- ICE wheelsets
- Robel track-laying machines
- Various DB track-laying machines (Deutsches Museum)
- Signal box from Polling station
- Mechanical signal box
- Signal gantry from Spaichingen station
- Model of the Freilassing shed

== Special ==
In October 2006 the nostalgic Istanbul Orient Express visited the Freilassing Locomotive World as the first 'special' after it had been opened in the September. From the middle to the end of November 2006 the train was stationed in the Augsburg Railway Park, before it began a special trip from Augsburg to Salzburg. The train could be visited there for two days.

== See also ==
- History of rail transport in Germany
- Royal Bavarian State Railways
- Deutsche Reichsbahn
- Deutsche Bundesbahn
- Deutsches Museum
