= End-to-end =

End-to-end or End to End may refer to:

- End-to-end auditable voting systems, a category of voting systems with stringent integrity properties
- End-to-end delay, the time for a packet to be transmitted across a network from source to destination
- End-to-end encryption, a cryptographic paradigm involving uninterrupted protection of data traveling between two communicating parties
- End-to-end data integrity
- End-to-end principle, a principal design element of the Internet
- End-to-end reinforcement learning
- End-to-end vector, points from one end of a polymer to the other end
- Land's End to John o' Groats, the journey from "End to End" across Great Britain
- End-to-end testing (see also: Verification and validation)

== See also ==
- E2E (disambiguation)
- Point-to-point (telecommunications)
