= Bavarian B IX =

Bavarian B IX DRG Class 34.74
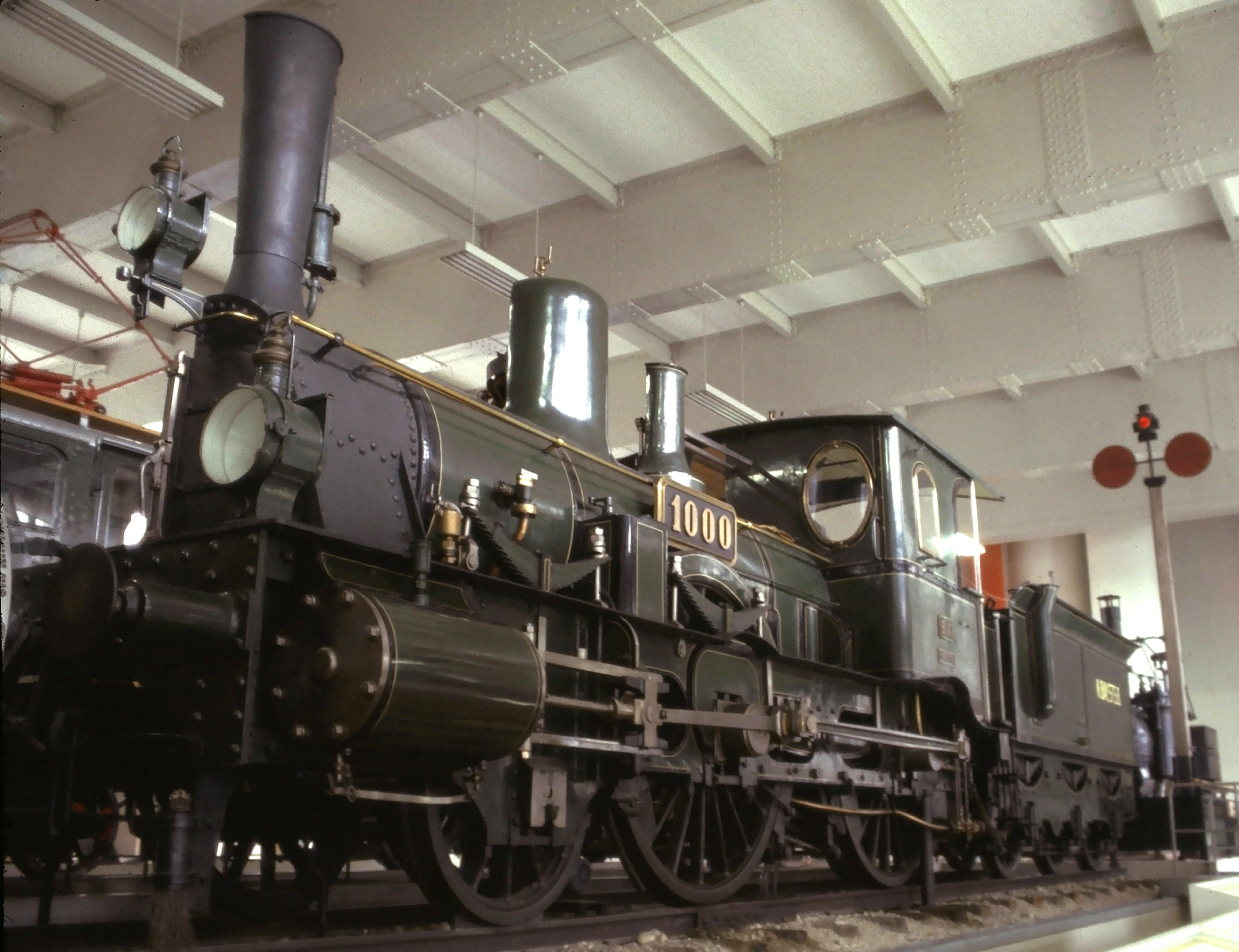
- Bavarian B IX "1000" in the Deutsches Museum
Type and origin
- Builder: Maffei
- Build date: 1874–1887
- Total produced: 104
Specifications
- Configuration
  - Whyte: 2-4-0
- Gauge: 1,435 mm (4 ft 8 1/2 in)
- Leading dia.: 1,170 mm (3 ft 10 1/8 in)
- Driver dia.: 1,870 mm (6 ft 1 5/8 in)
- Length
  - Over beams: 13,960 to 14,050 mm (45 ft 9 1/2 in to 46 ft 1 1/4 in)
- Axle load: 11.0 t (10.8 long tons; 12.1 short tons)
- Adhesive weight: 22.0 t (21.7 long tons; 24.3 short tons)
- Service weight: 33.6 t (33.1 long tons; 37.0 short tons)
- Water cap.: 10.5 m^{3} (2,300 imp gal; 2,800 US gal)
- Boiler pressure: 10 kgf/cm^{2} (981 kPa; 142 lbf/in^{2})
- Heating surface
  - Firebox: 1.50 or 1.70 m^{2} (16.1 or 18.3 sq ft)
  - Evaporative: 88.50 or 91.00 m^{2} (952.6 or 979.5 sq ft)
- Cylinders: 2
- Cylinder size: 406 mm (16 in)
- Piston stroke: 610 mm (24 in)
Performance figures
- Maximum speed: 90 km/h (56 mph)
Career
- Numbers: 602 STEINBERG to 139 SALZBURG; DRG 34 7421–7440 (planned)
- Retired: by 1924

The B IXs of the Royal Bavarian State Railways (Königlich Bayerische Staatsbahn), built from 1874, were the first express train locomotives in Bavaria. (N.B. The engines described here are not to be confused with the B IX steam engines built in 1870 and described under Bavarian B IX (1870).)

As a result of the boiler being positioned low and the rear driving axle being under the outer firebox there was no longer any overhanging weight and the speed of the engine could be increased to 90 km/h. The locomotive could also haul a 150-ton train on the level at a speed of 70 km/h. The engines, retaining the design of their forerunners, had an outside locomotive frame and Stephenson valve gear. The units taken over by the Reichsbahn were run under the operating numbers 34 7421–7440. The locomotives built from 1874 were retired by 1924.

At the Deutsches Museum in Munich a sectioned example has been preserved. Parts of the collection, including the B IX, are stored in the Freilassing Locomotive World (Lokwelt Freilassing) museum in Freilassing due to a shortage of space.

The vehicles were coupled to Bavarian 3 T 10,5 tenders.

== See also ==
- Royal Bavarian State Railways
- List of Bavarian locomotives and railbuses
