= DB Class 103 =

Class of 4+145 electric locomotives in Germany

Deutsche Bundesbahn Baureihe 103
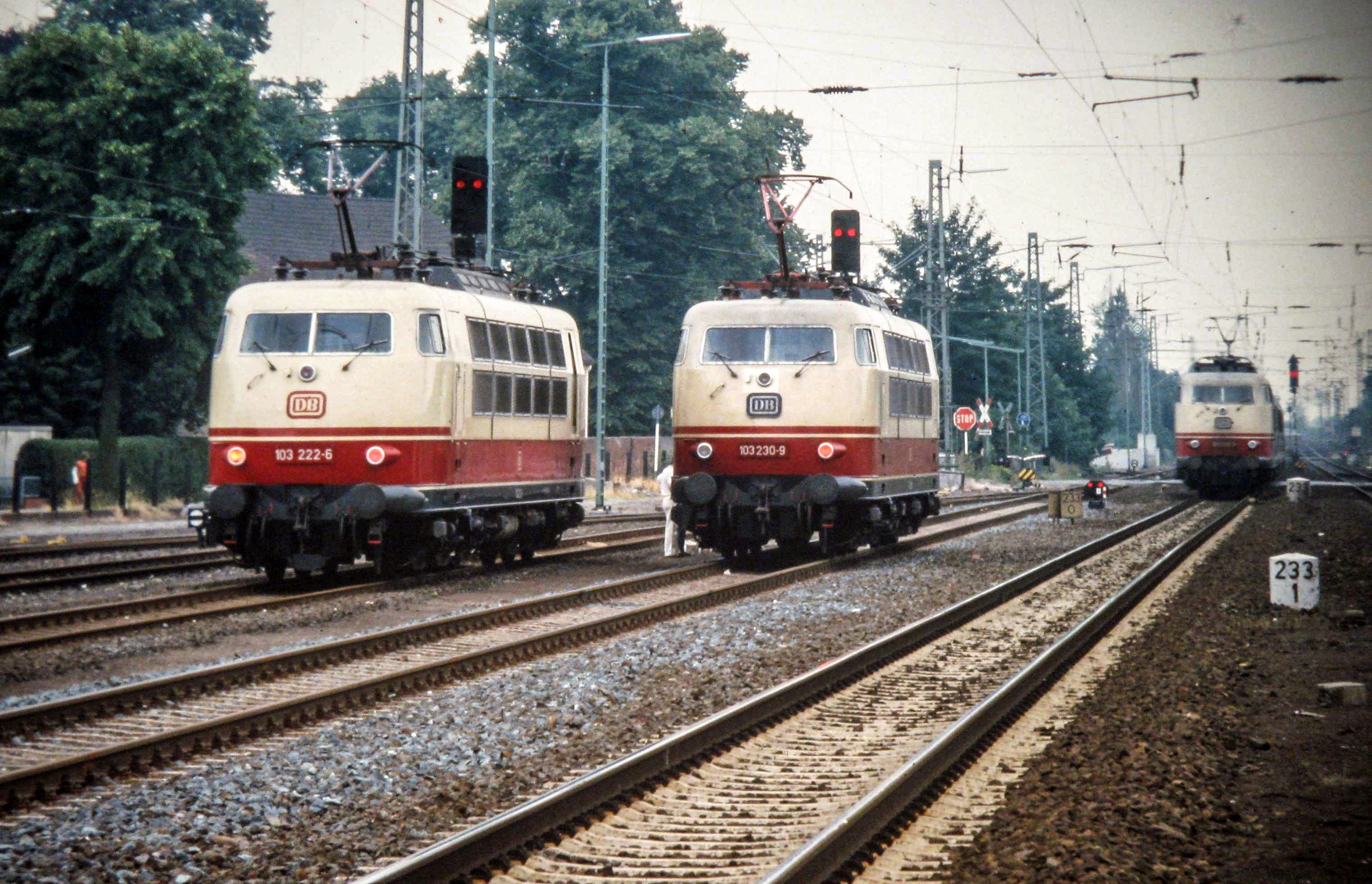
- DB class 103 in Bremen-Hemelingen on 11 July 1984
Type and origin
- Power type: Electric
- Builder: AEG, Brown Boveri & Cie, Henschel, Krauss-Maffei, Krupp, Siemens
- Build date: Prototype: 1965; Production: 1970–1973
- Total produced: Prototype: 4; Production: 145
Specifications
- Configuration
  - UIC: Co′Co′
- Gauge: 1,435 mm (4 ft 8 1/2 in) standard gauge
- Length: 19.50 m (63 ft 11 3/4 in); 20.20 m (66 ft 3 1/4 in) last 30
- Loco weight: Prototype: 112 t (110 long tons; 123 short tons); Production: 114 t (112 long tons; 126 short tons)
- Electric system/s: 15 kV 16 2/3 Hz Catenary
- Current pickup: Pantograph
- Traction motors: Six
- Loco brake: KE-GPR, electric brakes
- Train brakes: Air
- Safety systems: Sifa, LZB, PZB
Performance figures
- Maximum speed: 200 km/h (124 mph); 265 km/h (165 mph) 103 118; 280 km/h (174 mph) 103 003+222
- Power output: Prototype: 5,950 kW (7,980 hp); Production: 7,440 kW (9,980 hp)
- Tractive effort: Prototype: 314 kN (71,000 lbf); Production: 312 kN (70,000 lbf)
Career
- Operators: Deutsche Bundesbahn; Deutsche Bahn AG
- Class: Baureihe 103
- Withdrawn: 2017

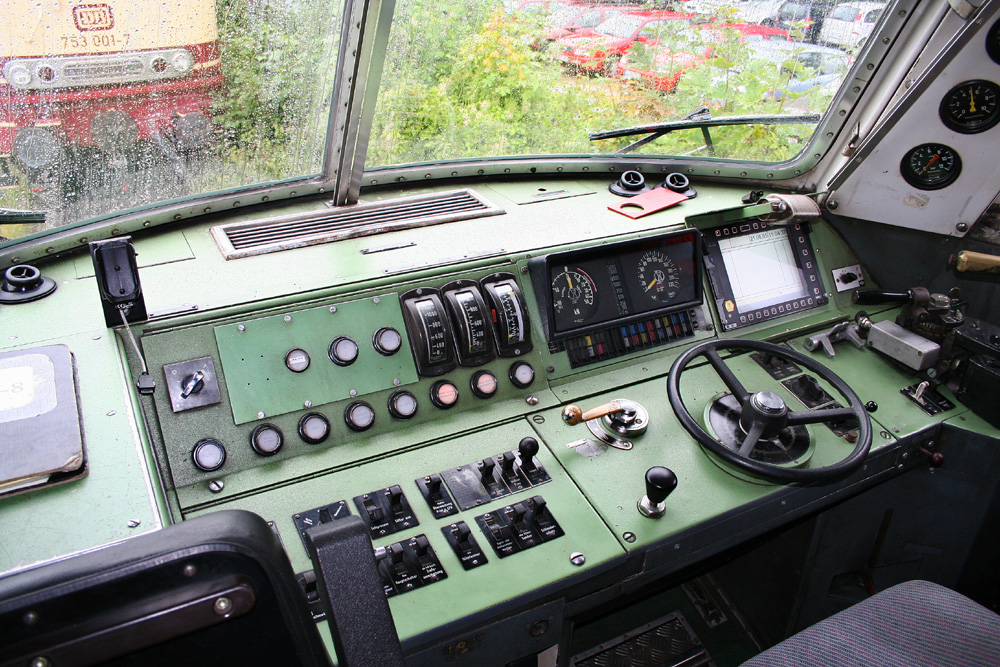
Cockpit

The Baureihe 103 is a class of electric locomotives in Germany, originally operated by Deutsche Bundesbahn. For a long period, they were perceived as flagships of the DB rolling stock.

== Development ==
In the decades following World War II, the Deutsche Bundesbahn focused on purchasing a large number of standardised electric locomotives. The goal was to promote the electrification program and to replace older types of electric locomotives. A maximum speed of 160 kilometres per hour (99 mph) was deemed sufficient. With growing economic prosperity, competition with other means of transportation, especially automobiles, was increasing.

During the 1950s, plans were made to enhance pre-war Class E 19 locomotives to have a top speed of 180 kilometres per hour (110 mph), but the technical layout was out-dated and the braking system was deemed inefficient. The plans were revised to demand a top speed of 200 kilometres per hour (120 mph), combined with a Co′Co′ wheel arrangement to limit the axle load to 18 tons. Elements of the new class, such as high speed bogies, were tested with existing Class E 10 units.

== Prototypes ==
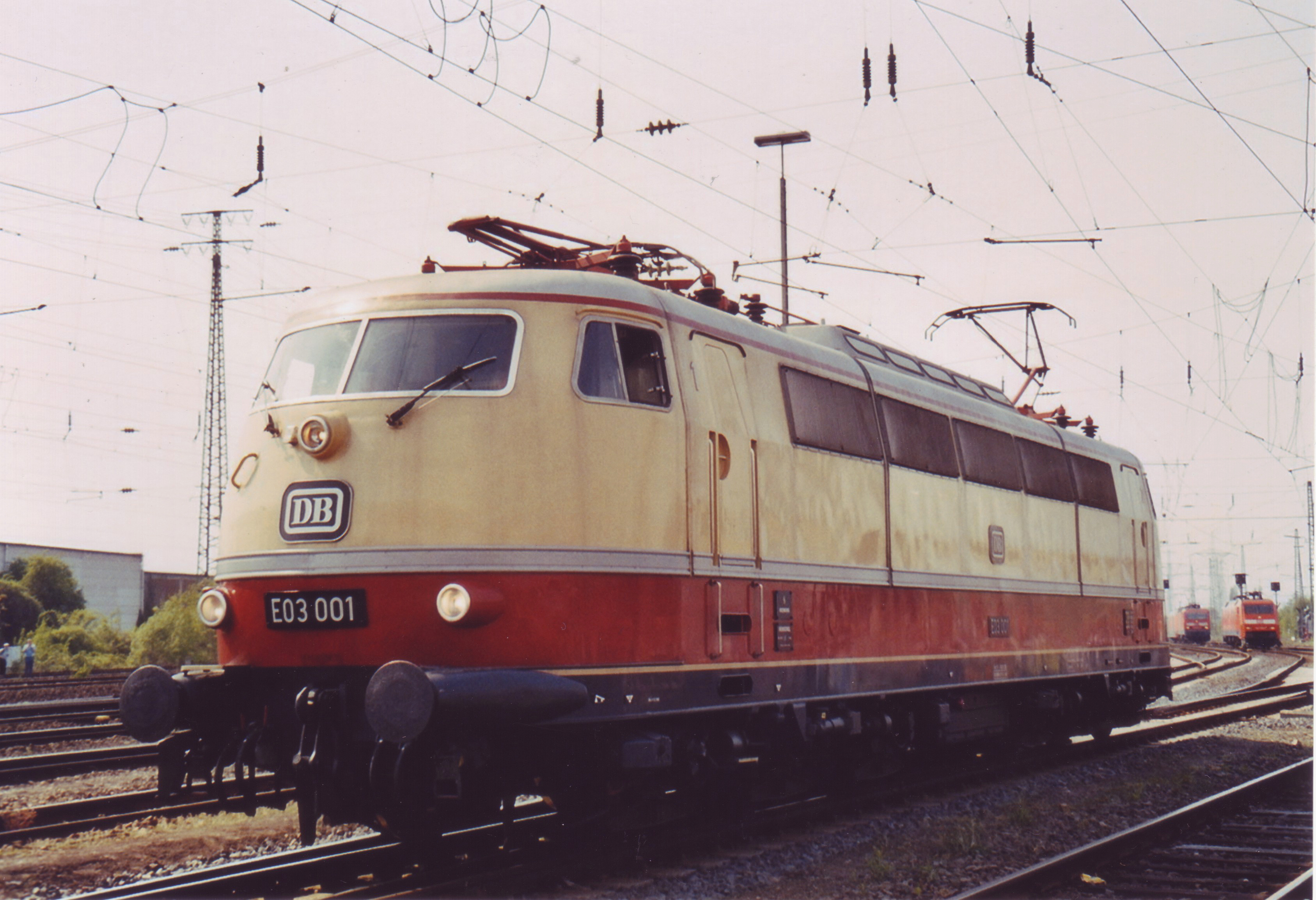
E03 001 during a locomotive parade at the DB Museum, Koblenz, May 2006

Four prototypes were finished in 1965. They were introduced to the public at the Internationale Verkehrsausstellung (international transport fair) in Munich in June 1965 as Class E 03 (Class 103.0 after the introduction of the new numbering system). During exhibition runs to Augsburg they reached 200 km/h on a regular basis. The experience gained on these occasions indicated that the installed power of 5,950 kW or 7,980 hp (continuous — 6,420 kW or 8,610 hp one hour) was insufficient. In addition to stronger motors the transformer was also reinforced for serial production.

== Serial type ==
The first serial type Class 103.1 was put into service on 27 May 1970. DB planned to introduce a new Intercity system with fast first class connections between major cities in autumn of 1971, so the specification sheet demanded Class 103.1 to be capable of pulling a 400-tonne (390-long-ton; 440-short-ton) train at 200 km/h (120 mph). With a total number of 145 units, Class 103.1 became the backbone of German Trans Europ Express and InterCity lines. Starting with 103 216, the locomotive body was extended by 700 mm (27 1/2 in) in order to provide more space in the driver's cab.

In addition to the usual Sifa and PZB, Class 103 was also equipped with the LZB as an additional train safety system for speed in excess of 160 km/h (99 mph). The so-called Automatische Fahr- und Bremssteuerung (AFB) (automatic speed and brake control) automatically kept the train's speed constant at any chosen speed.

== Service ==
With inauguration of the new InterCity system only a few lines (Hanover-Celle, Düsseldorf-Cologne and Munich-Augsburg) were enhanced for a top speed of 200 km/h (120 mph), and the necessary government approvals for speeds higher than 160 km/h (99 mph) was also missing. Therefore, Class 103 in the first years did not reach its top speed in regular service. An accident furthermore delayed the introduction of regular top speed services, as on 21 July 1971 the AFB on 103 106 was suspected to be responsible for accelerating the train out of control, resulting in a derailment with 23 dead and 121 injured near Rheinweiler.

In 1979, when second class was introduced in addition to the formerly exclusively first class InterCity system, this resulted in a sharp rise in popularity and demand, making the IC system the backbone for long distance rail travel in West Germany. By that time the technical problems had been overcome, and the top speed of 200 km/h (120 mph) was permitted on a few lines with the necessary features (LZB and adaption of overhead lines in particular). However, after having only been scheduled for pulling trains with a few first-class carriages or the odd D-train, the major challenge for Class 103 now was to pull heavy 600 tonnes (590 long tons; 660 short tons) two-class InterCity trains on the long north-south stretches through West Germany. Governed by a very intense schedule, with one train per hour on every InterCity line in each direction, locomotives would perform well over 1,000 km (620 mi) on a single day. Given the few lines in the network where 200 km/h (120 mph) were actually reached, their effect on the wear and tear of the locos can therefore be considered a lesser factor.

Until 1987, when the Class 120 three-phase alternating current locomotives were introduced, Class 103 had a near monopoly for fast trains in Germany, and a monopoly for those with operational speeds beyond 160 kilometres per hour (99 mph). By the early 1990s, the intensive utilisation however, had resulted in an increasing number of defects. This tendency was intensified by the fact that DB, striving to be privatized, had significantly cut back on maintenance.

Furthermore, with the first InterCityExpress entering regular service in 1991, Class 103 had been deprived of its role as DB flagship. Considering wear and tear, DB decided to replace these locomotives with the new Class 101, which entered service in 1996.
In the following years, Class 103 was relegated to lesser duties, but the locomotive had not been designed for frequent stops, so wear increased at an even quicker pace. After a brief comeback in 1998, when all InterCityExpress units were temporarily taken out of service after the Eschede train disaster, the remaining Class 103 units were retired from regular service by 2003. However, on 19 March 2013, these preserved Class 103 locomotives returned to daily services from Munich, wearing their original Inter City livery. Nuremberg-based No. 103245 hauled train IC2201 from Nuremberg HBf with OBB Class 1116 134. Frankfurt based Class 103s were scheduled to work IC118 Stuttgart to Munster, IC2099 Frankfurt HBf to Stuttgart, IC 2316 Stuttgart to Wiesbaden and LR78688 Wiesbaden to Frankfurt HBf.

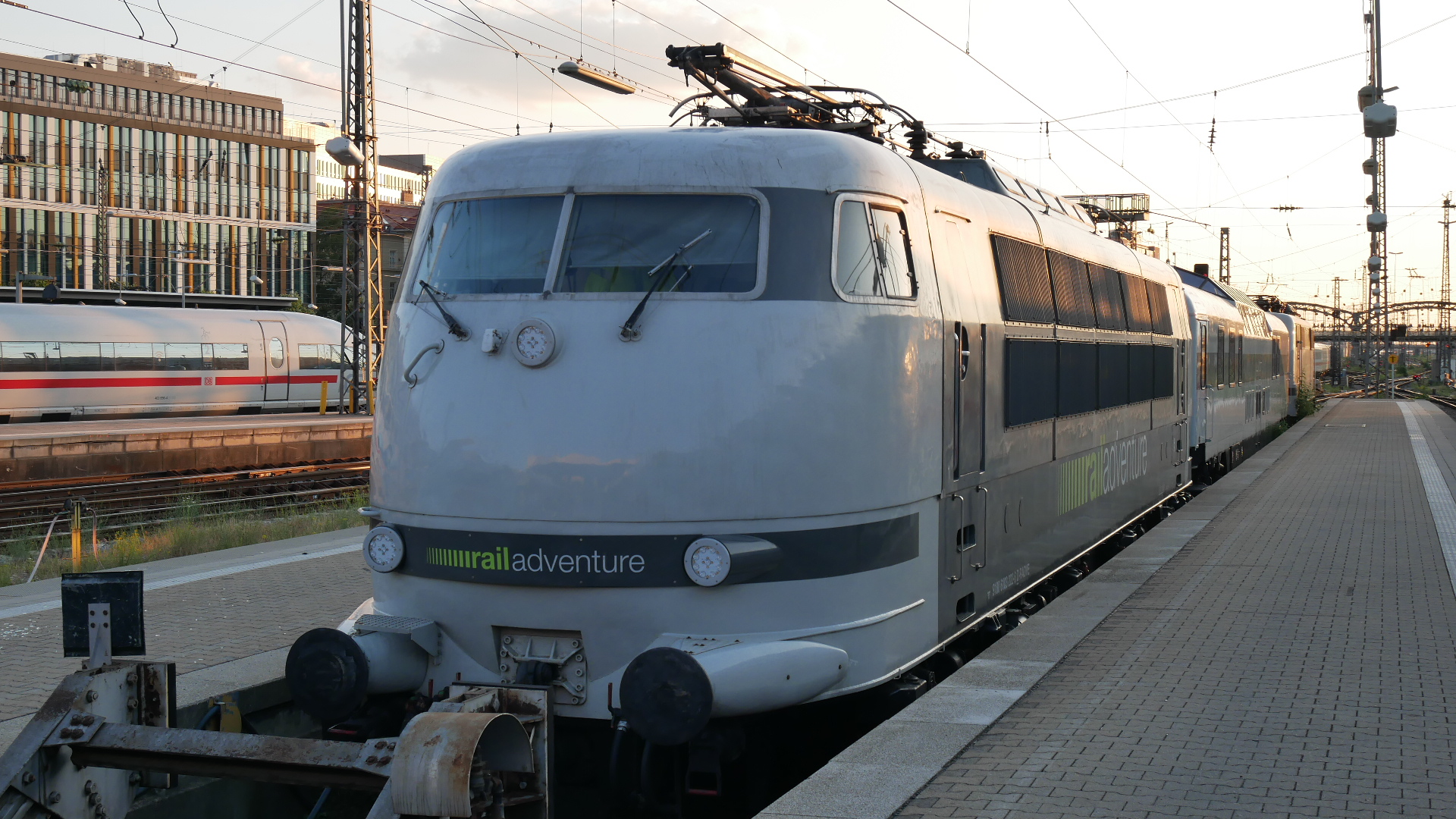
DB Class 103 (Baureihe 103) of RailAdventure at Munich Hauptbahnhof. It remains in use hauling special passenger trains.

== Statistics ==
- A total of 17 Class 103 have been preserved, with at least five units still operational. Two units are still part of DB rolling stock and are frequently used for test runs.
- With a one-hour rating of 10,400 kW (13,900 hp) or 12,000 kW (16,000 hp) Class 103 are among the most powerful conventional electric locomotives ever built and they are the most powerful single-section locomotives ever built. Later, its maximum power output has been limited to 9,000 kW (12,000 hp).
- On 14 June 1985, No. 103 118 reached a speed of 283 km/h (176 mph).
- The highest operational performance for one unit was reached in June 1972 with 50,250 km (31,220 mi).

== Sources ==
- Dostal, Michael (2013). Baureihe 103: Die erste Schnellfahr-Locomotive der Bundesbahn [Class 103: the first high speed locomotive of the Bundesbahn] (in German). München: GeraMond. ISBN 9783956130038.
