= DB Class E 41 =

Deutsche Bundesbahn class E 41
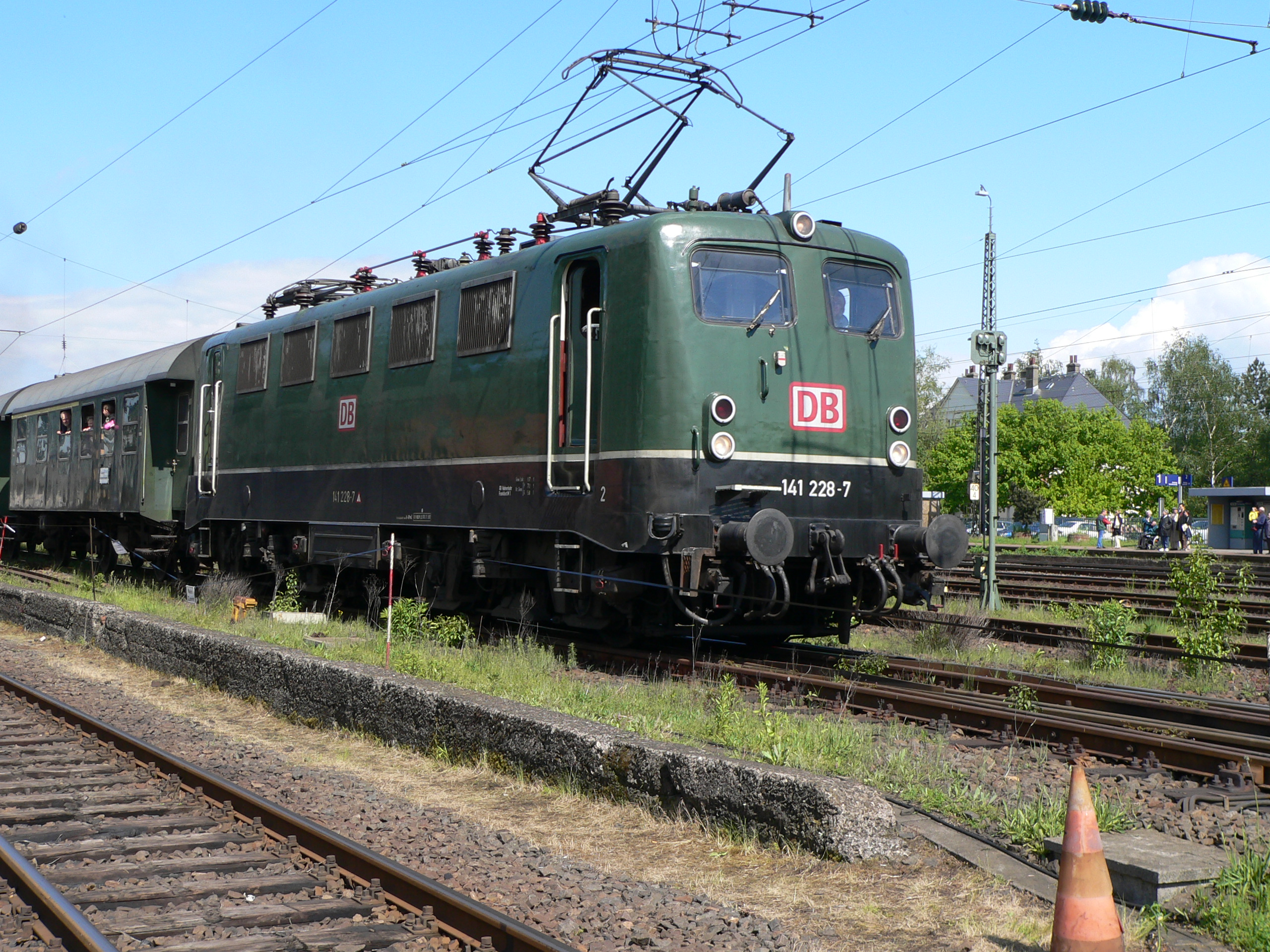
- DB 141 228-7 in Kranichstein, Germany
Type and origin
- Power type: Electric
- Builder: AEG, BBC, Henschel, Krauss-Maffei, Siemens
- Build date: 1956-1971
- Total produced: 451
Specifications
- Configuration
  - UIC: Bo′Bo′
- Gauge: 1,435 mm (4 ft 8 1/2 in) standard gauge
- Length: 15.62 m (51 ft 3 in)
- Loco weight: 67 t (66 long tons; 74 short tons)
- Electric system/s: 15 kV 16.7 Hz Catenary
- Current pickup: Pantograph
- Traction motors: Four
- Loco brake: K-GP mZ, electric brakes (141 447-451 only)
- Train brakes: Air
- Safety systems: Sifa, PZB
Performance figures
- Maximum speed: 120 km/h (75 mph)
- Power output: 2,400 kW (3,200 hp)
- Tractive effort: 206 kN (46,000 lbf)
Career
- Operators: Deutsche Bundesbahn; Deutsche Bahn AG
- Class: E41 (from 1968: 141)
- Nicknames: Knallfrosch (firecracker)
- Retired: 1987–2006

The class E 41, also known as the DB Class 141 is the first class of German Einheits-Elektrolokomotive (see related article for more details on development) commissioned by the Deutsche Bundesbahn in 1956.

== Development and first years of service ==
Class E 41 was designed for local traffic and branch lines. Since the 1968 renumbering, it is listed as class 141. Its nickname is Knallfrosch (firecracker), as the tap changer makes loud cracking noises when changing notches. A total of 451 units were built.

Originally designed as an effective means of traction for light passenger trains, and with a top speed of 120 kilometres per hour (75 mph) and an axle load below 17 tonnes (16.7 long tons; 18.7 short tons), class E 41 was also designated for passenger services on smaller lines. In the 1950s, due to general lack of locomotives, class E 41 was also used for express train service. However, after speed of express trains was raised to 140 kilometres per hour (87 mph) in the early 1960s, the class mostly lost its express services.

== Past usage ==
In its original role for hauling local trains, class E 41 proved both reliable and efficient, especially with push-pull trains. Less successful was the usage with S-Bahn trains, as class E 41 was not equipped with regenerative braking, which would have helped to reduce abrasion. Class E 41 service stayed largely unchanged until the early 1990s. Since then many units have been replaced by former Deutsche Reichsbahn units of class 143 especially in S-Bahn service. Furthermore, since mid-1990s EMUs and newer locomotives as class 146 replaced even more class 141 units. Since then, many have been scrapped. Unit 141 188 was the first to retire on 31 October 1987; the total number of engines has hence fallen since. The last four remaining units, which finally were held ready hot standby around Frankfurt and used in case of need for defective younger machines were de-commissioned in December 2006.

== Liveries ==
- stahlblau RAL 5011 (141 001 - 141 071)
- chromoxydgrün RAL 6020 (141 072 - 141 451)
- ozeanblau/beige RAL 5020 / RAL 1011 (repaint 1976-1987)
- S-Bahn Rhein Ruhr (variant of the 5020/1011 scheme, 141 248 1977-2001)
- orientrot RAL 3031 (1987 onwards, many units repainted)
- kieselgrau/orange RAL 7035 / RAL 2012 (Nuremberg S-Bahn, 141 436-442)
- verkehrsrot RAL 3020 (1998 onwards)
