= DB Class E 50 =

Deutsche Bundesbahn Baureihe E 50
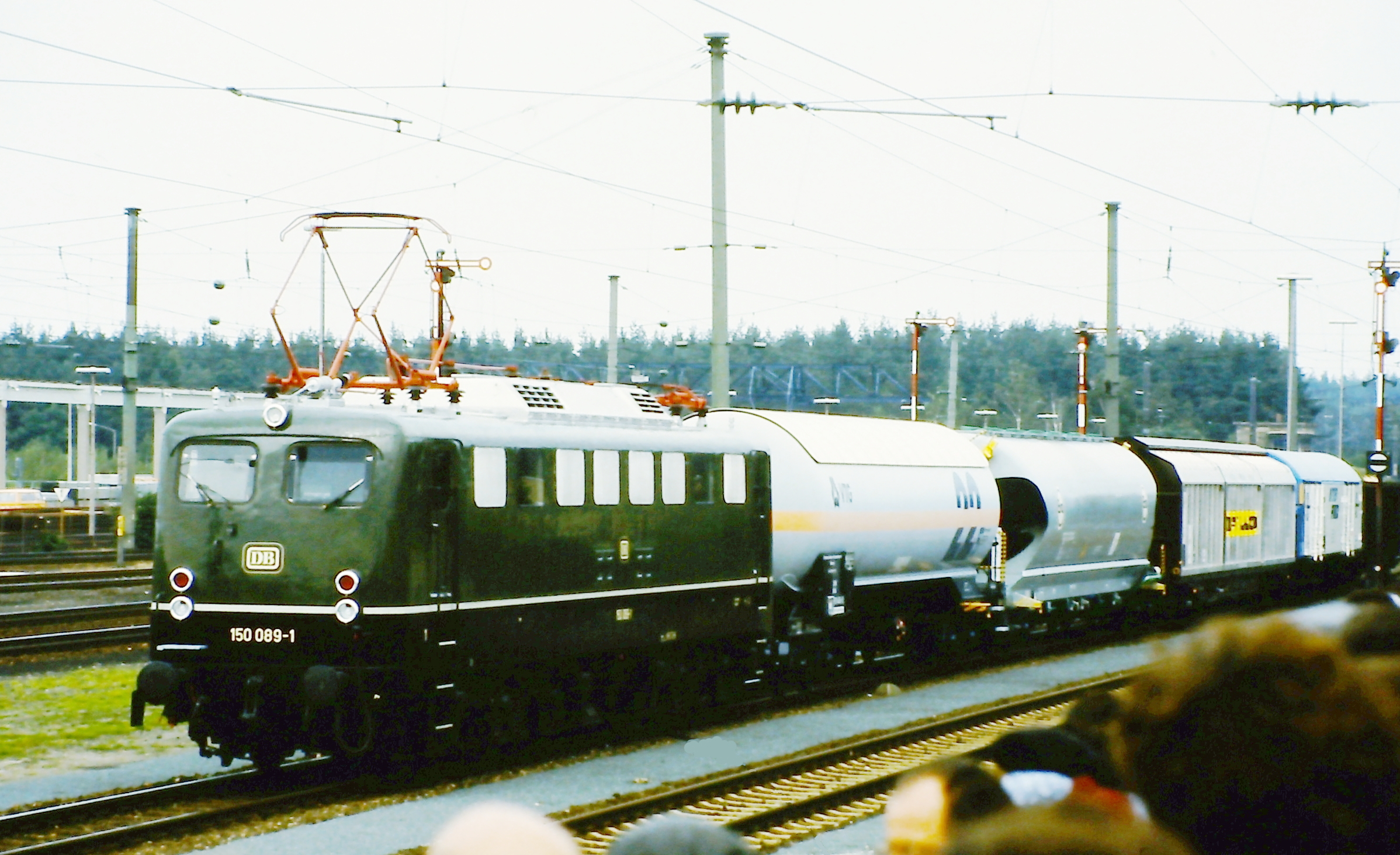
- E50 089
Type and origin
- Power type: Electric
- Builder: Krupp, AEG, BBC, Henschel, Krauss-Maffei, SSW
- Build date: 1957–73
- Total produced: 194
Specifications
- Configuration
  - UIC: Co′Co′
- Gauge: 1,435 mm (4 ft 8 1/2 in) standard gauge
- Length: 19,490 mm (63 ft 11 3/8 in)
- Axle load: 21.4 t (21.1 long tons; 23.6 short tons)
- Loco weight: 128 t (126 long tons; 141 short tons)
- Electric system/s: 15 kV 16.7 Hz Catenary
- Current pickup(s): Pantograph
- Safety systems: InduSi, SiFa, PZB
Performance figures
- Maximum speed: 100 km/h (62 mph)
- Power output: 4,500 kW (6,000 hp)
- Tractive effort: Continuous: 210 kN (47,000 lb_{f}), Starting: 450 kN (100,000 lb_{f})
Career
- Delivered: 1957
- Withdrawn: 2003
- Preserved: 2

The Class E 50 is an electric heavy freight locomotive built for German Federal Railways between 1957 and 1973. It belongs to the Einheits-Elektrolokomotiven (standardised electric locomotives) program and was built as a heavy freight mover to be used on the increasingly electrified main lines of the DB, where they were set to replace the steam traction. In 1968 the series was redesignated as class 150 (E50). Originally the Class 150 was also suitable for passenger service; however, it did not have any steam or electric heating capability for the passenger coaches.

== Production ==
In 1957 the first locomotive, 150 001, was delivered by AEG and Krupp. Altogether, 194 locomotives were ordered and delivered.

== Performance ==
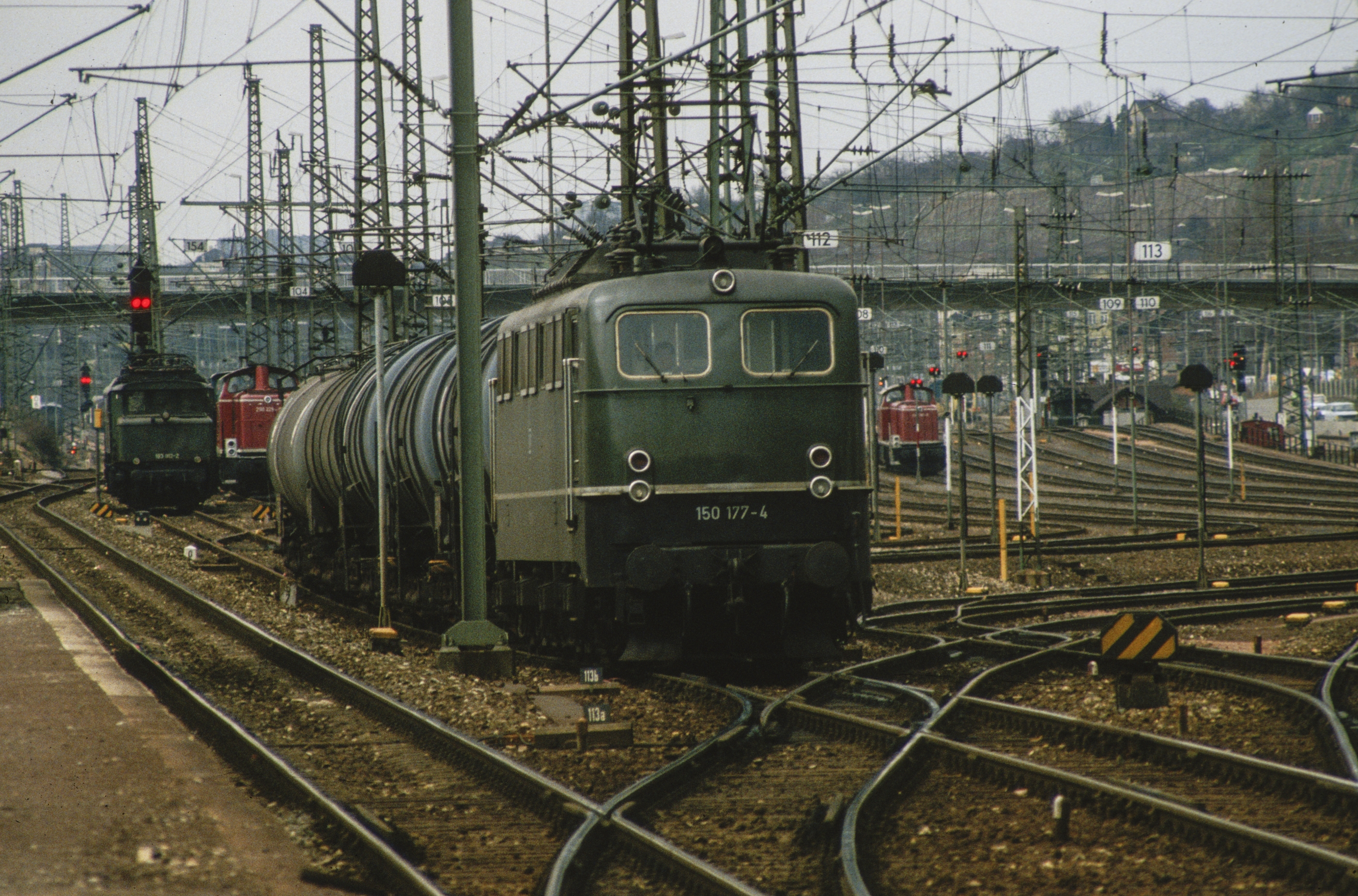
E 50 177 in 1985

To date, the Class 150's starting tractive effort of 450 kN (100,000 lb_{f}) remains unparalleled on German rails. In fact, it was very close to the breaking force of the buffers and chain couplers used at the time of its production. Some engines were therefore fitted with automatic coupling (type unicupler AK69e) to haul heavy ore-trains.

== Survivors ==
By 2004 all class 150 locomotives except 150 091 and 150 186 were scrapped.
