= Standard electric locomotive =

Electric locomotives of the Deutsche Bundesbahn from the 1950s and 1960s

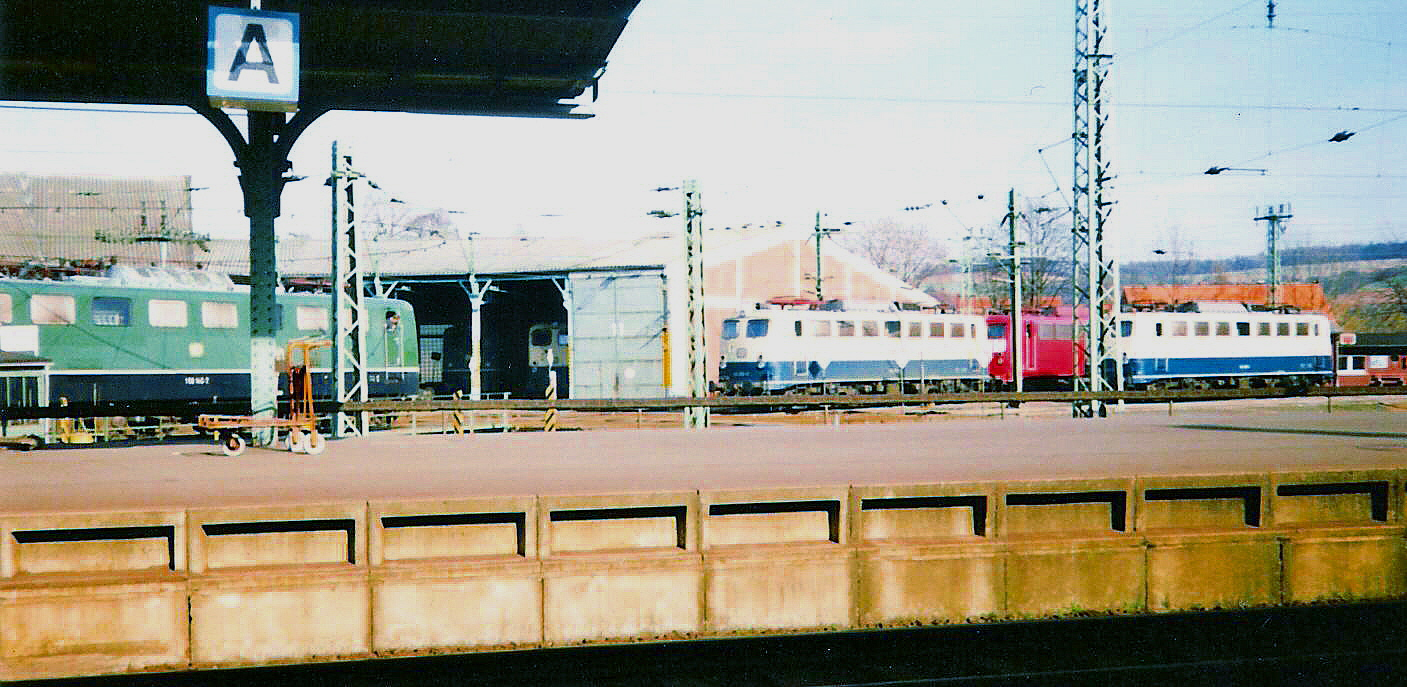
Several units at the Bebra workshop

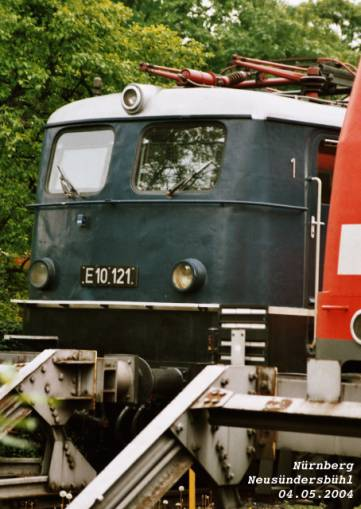
Heritage unit E10 121

Einheits-Elektrolokomotive (translates as standard electric locomotive) is a German railroad term for the Class E10, Class E40, Class E41 and Class E50 locomotives that were commissioned after World War II by the Deutsche Bundesbahn of West Germany. The goal of the Einheits-Elektrolokomotive was to present a common platform on which the engines were based to simplify maintenance and provide interchangeability of parts. This had been done before by the Einheitsdampflokomotiven or 'standard steam locomotives' of the Deutsche Reichsbahn during the 1920s. The DB classes greatly exceeded their estimated lifetime of 30 years, some engines still are in service today with private rail companies, after gradually being phased out in favour of newer engines by Deutsche Bahn AG until the 2010s, the successor of the Deutsche Bundesbahn.

For further description of the program see also the article on DB Class E 40.

== See also ==
- History of rail transport in Germany
