= List of preserved steam locomotives in Germany =

This list of preserved steam locomotives in Germany makes no claim to being complete. While there are many surviving examples of several locomotive classes, some are in a very poor condition. Thus the list includes partly dismantled or badly corroded locomotives, the technical condition of which cannot really be accurately conveyed in their descriptions.

In many cases the names of organisations, societies and museums have been translated in line with Wikipedia practice. However where they have a standard abbreviation in German, this has been retained. For example, the German Railway History Company (Deutsche Gesellschaft für Eisenbahngeschichte) is abbreviated to DGEG, its normal (German) abbreviation. In either case the link leads to the English Wikipedia article where both English and German names are given. In addition the following common German abbreviations are used:

- AW = Ausbesserungswerk = repair shop
- BW = Bahnbetriebswerk = locomotive depot
- EM = Eisenbahnmuseum = railway museum
- RAW = Reichsbahnausbesserungswerk = Reichsbahn repair shop

== Special locomotives ==
Replicas of historic engines, that cannot be grouped into a specific class.

Name	Type	Built	Manufacturer	Owner	Location	Image	Remarks	Working
Adler	2-2-2	1935	AW Kaiserslautern	Deutsche Bahn	Nuremberg Transport Museum, Nuremberg		Working replica of the first steam locomotive to run in Germany;	Yes
Adler	2-2-2	1952	AW Offenburg	Deutsche Bahn	Nuremberg Transport Museum, Nuremberg		Rolling replica of the first steam locomotive to run in Germany	Museum locomotive
Die Pfaltz	4-2-0	1925	RAW Weiden	Deutsche Bahn	Neustadt/Weinstrasse Railway Museum		Replica of a Crampton locomotive built by J. A. Maffei as the Palatinate Railway No. 26	Museum locomotive
Beuth	2-2-2	1912		Deutsches Technikmuseum Berlin (DTMB)	DTMB, Berlin		Replica of the first steam locomotive independently developed in Germany by August Borsig, works number 24, around 1841	Museum locomotive
Saxonia	0-4-2	1988	AW Halle	Deutsche Bahn	Dresden Transport Museum, Dresden		Working replica of the first effectively-functioning steam locomotive built in Germany, DB 088 895-8	Yes

== Locomotives that can be grouped into the classification scheme ==
=== Class 01 ===
==== Class 01.0–2 ====
The Class 01 locomotives were the first production series standard express train locomotives in the Deutsche Reichsbahn. They were of the 4-6-2 or Pacific type.

Running no.	EDP- No.	Built	Manufacturer Works no.	Owner	Operator Route	Location	Image	Remarks	Working
01 005	01 2005-5	1925	Borsig; 11997	Dresden Transport Museum		TBW Staßfurt		Lowest numbered preserved 01, delivered 17 February 1926	Museum locomotive
01 008	001 008-2	1925	Borsig; 12000	DGEG		Bochum-Dahlhausen Railway Museum		Oldest preserved German, Einheitslokomotive, delivered 26 January 1926	Museum locomotive
01 024		1927	Henschel; 20827	BEM		BEM, Nördlingen		Used for spare parts, formerly steam generator 10 at Staßfurt	Museum locomotive
01 066	012 066-7	1928	BMAG; 9020	BEM		BEM, Nördlingen		Ex-heating engine at Nauen	Yes
01 111	001 111-2	1934	BMAG; 10309	DDM		DDM, Neuenmarkt			Museum locomotive
01 118	01 2118-6	1934	Krupp; 1415	HEF	Frankfurt Harbour Railway, HLB (Königsteiner Bahn)	Frankfurt Eastern Harbour		Deutsche Reichsbahn until 1981	Yes
01 137	01 2137-6	1935	Henschel; 22579	Deutsche Bahn	Dresden Transport Museum	BW Dresden-Altstadt		DBAG 088 016-1	Museum locomotive
01 150	001 150-0	1935	Henschel; 22698	Deutsche Bahn	Railroad Foundation Joachim Schmidt	SEH, Heilbronn		Damaged in a major fire on 17 October 2005 at Nuremberg locomotive depot. Rebuilt by DLW Meiningen, including a new boiler. Returned to service 23 May 2013. DBAG 088 011-2	Yes
01 164	001 164-1	1936	Henschel; 22712	Norbert Heidrich (private)		Lichtenfels			Museum locomotive
01 173	001 173-2	1936	Henschel; 22721	Deutsches Technikmuseum Berlin (DTMB)		SEH, Heilbronn		Undergoing restoration	Not yet
01 180	001 180-9	1937	Henschel; 22923	BEM		BEM, Nördlingen		Repatriated from Switzerland in 2011	Museum locomotive
01 204	01 2204-4	1937	Henschel; 23256	Bernd Falz (private)		EM Hermeskeil		Ex-DR heritage locomotive	Museum locomotive
01 220	001 220-1	1937	Henschel; 23468	Deutsche Bahn	Town of Treuchtlingen	Thermalbad Treuchtlingen			Monument

==== Class 01.5 ====
The Class 01.5 were reconstructed DRG Class 01 express locomotives (Rekoloks) reclassified by the Deutsche Reichsbahn in East Germany.

Running no.	EDP- No.	Built	Manufacturer Factory no.	Owner	Operator Route	Location	Image	Remarks	Working
01 509	01 0509-8	1963	RAW Meiningen; 111	Preßnitztalbahn	Preßnitztalbahn	Espenhain		Ex 01 143, oil-fired, Operational since April 2010	Yes
01 514	01 1514-7	1963	RAW Meiningen; 116	Technikmuseum Speyer		TM Speyer		Ex 01 208	Museum locomotive
01 519	01 1519-6	1964	RAW Meiningen; 121	Eisenbahnfreunde Zollernbahn	Badische Schwarzwaldbahn	BW Rottweil		Ex 01 186	Yes
01 531	01 1531-1	1964	RAW Meiningen; 134	Deutsche Bahn	Society for the Promotion of BW Arnstadt	EM BW Arnstadt		Ex 01 158, coal-fired, cone-shaped smokebox door. DBAG 088 015-3	No

==== Class 01.10 ====
The Class 01.10 were standard express train locomotives with the Deutsche Reichsbahn. The Class 01.10 was an evolutionary development of Class 01 with 3 cylinders and streamlining. On the introduction of computerised (EDP) numbers, the coal-fired locomotives were renumbered to the 011 series and the oil-fired versions to 012.

Running no.	EDP- No.	Built	Manufacturer Factory no.	Owner	Operator Route	Location	Image	Remarks	Working
01 1056	011 056-9	1939	BMAG; 11312	DME		Darmstadt-Kranichstein Railway Museum		Coal-fired, formerly a monument at Rheine	Museum locomotive
01 1061	012 061-8	1939	BMAG; 11317	DDM		DDM, Neuenmarkt		Oil-fired	Museum locomotive
01 1063	012 063-4	1939	BMAG; 11319	City of Brunswick		HBF, Brunswick		Oil-fired	Monument
01 1066	012 066-7	1939	BMAG; 11322	UEF	Historical Steam Express Train Group	SEH, Heilbronn		Oil-fired	Yes
01 1075	012 075-6	1940	BMAG 11331	SSN		Rotterdam, Netherlands		Coal-fired, formerly oil-fired	Yes
01 1081	012 081-6	1940	BMAG; 11337	UEF	Historical Steam Express Train Group	Augsburg Railway Park		Oil-fired, formerly a monument at Bad Münster am Stein	Museum locomotive
01 1082	012 082-4	1940	BMAG; 11338	Deutsches Technikmuseum Berlin (DTMB)		DTMB, Berlin		Oil-fired	Museum locomotive
01 1100	012 100-4	1940	BMAG; 11356	Deutsche Bahn	REF	BW Oberhausen		Oil-fired. DBAG 088 010-4	No
01 1102	012 102-0	1940	BMAG; 11358	TransEurop Eisenbahn AG	Orient-Express Train de Luxe Betriebs GmbH	SEH, Heilbronn		Oil-fired; with streamlining, blue livery	Museum locomotive
01 1104	012 104-6	1940	BMAG; 11360	Privately owned		Bw Crailsheim		Oil-fired	No

=== Class 03 ===
The Class 03 engines were built between 1930 and 1937 as express locomotives for routes that were only suitable for axle loads up to 18 tonnes.

==== Class 03.0-2 ====
The low weight of this locomotive, which was based on the DRG Class 01, was achieved by using a light bar frame, smaller boiler and smaller cylinders. From running number 03 123 the pumps were located in the middle of the vehicle and from number 03 163 the locomotives had larger leading wheels. All locomotives had 2 cylinders.

Running no.	EDP- No.	Built	Manufacturer Factory no.	Owner	Operator Route	Location	Image	Remarks	Working
03 001	03 2001-0	1930	Borsig; 12251	Deutsche Bahn	Dresden Transport Museum	BW Dresden-Altstadt		Tender 2'2 T 30. DBAG 088 036-9	Museum locomotive
03 002	03 2002-8	1930	Borsig; 12252	Rügen Railway & Technology Museum (Rügen RTM)		Rügen RTM, Prora		With streamlining added later based on that of the 03 193	Museum locomotive
03 098	03 2098-6	1933	Borsig; 14449	Technikmuseum Speyer		Technikmuseum Speyer		DR Rekolok	Museum locomotive
03 131	003 131-4	1933	Henschel; 22211	German Steam Locomotive Museum (DDM)		DDM, Neuenmarkt			Museum locomotive
03 155	03 2155-4	1934	Borsig; 14475	Wedler & Franz GbR (WFL)	Wedler & Franz GbR (WFL)	Bw Nossen		DR Rekolok	Yes
03 188	003 188-0	1935	BMAG; 10329	Landkreis Esslingen	Nuremberg Transport Museum	Technical High School, Kirchheim Teck			Monument
03 204	03 2204-0	1936	Borsig; 14577	LDC		Bw Cottbus		Former monument at BW Cottbus, old-type boiler with mixer-preheater	No
03 243	03 2243-8	1936	Borsig; 14622	DLW Meiningen		DLW Meiningen		DR Rekolok; Disassembled	No
03 295	03 2295-8	1937	Borsig; 14692	Privately owned		Augsburg Railway Park		DR Rekolok	No

==== Class 03.10 ====
The Class 03.10 was an evolutionary development of the Class 03, comparable to the locomotives of Class 01.10, which were derived from Class 01. Class 03.10 were three-cylinder locomotives equipped with full streamlining on delivering.

Running no.	EDP- No.	Built	Manufacturer Factory no.	Owner	Operator Route	Location	Image	Remarks	Working
03 1010	03 0010-3; 03 1010-2	1940	Borsig; 14921	Deutsche Bahn		Nuremberg Transport Museum, Halle branch/ Bw Berlin-Schöneweide		DR Rekolok, rebuilt to oil-firing (03 0010-3), Converted back to coal (03 1010-2). DBAG 088 035-1	Yes
03 1090	03 0090-5	1940	Maffei; 15842	Deutsche Bahn	Mecklenburgische Eisenbahnfreunde Schwerin e.V.	BW Schwerin		DR Rekolok, oil-fired	No

=== Class 05 ===
Class 05 locomotives were standard express train locomotives of the Deutsche Reichsbahn with full streamlining. Three engines were built, number 05 002 achieved a world speed record for rail vehicles at over 200 km/h.

Running no.	EDP- No.	Built	Manufacturer Factory no.	Owner	Operator Route	Location	Image	Remarks	Working
05 001	—	1935	Borsig; 14552	Deutsche Bahn		Nuremberg Transport Museum		Streamlining on one side	Museum locomotive

=== Class 10 ===
The Class 10 were express locomotives and the last class of steam locomotives built by the Deutsche Bundesbahn. They were intended to replace the Class 01 and 01.10s. Only 2 units were built.

Running no.	EDP- No.	Built	Manufacturer Factory no.	Owner	Operator Route	Location	Image	Remarks	Working
10 001	010 001-6	1956	Krupp; 3351	DDM		DDM, Neuenmarkt		Oil-fired. Streamlining similar to 18 201, black/silver. Rolls, but not fully working	Museum locomotive

=== Class 15 ===
Before 1925, the Class 15 engine was classified as S 2/6 with the Royal Bavarian State Railways. This 4-4-4 locomotive was specially designed in 1906 as a one-off for express train testing.

Running no.	EDP- No.	Built	Manufacturer Factory no.	Owner	Operator Route	Location	Image	Remarks	Working
(15 001)	—	1906	Maffei; 2519	Deutsche Bahn		Nuremberg Transport Museum, Nuremberg		Bavarian S 2/6 No. 3201; DRG running number was never carried	Museum locomotive

=== Class 17 ===
Class 17 was assigned to 4-6-0 Express passenger locomotives of the various Länderbahnen (state railways)

==== Class 17.0 ====
The Deutsche Reichsbahn grouped 2 very similar state railway express locomotive classes into DRG Class 17.0-1: nos. 17 001 – 17 135 (the Prussian S 10) and nos. 17 141 – 17 143 (the LBE S 10)

Running no.	EDP- No.	Built	Manufacturer Factory no.	Owner	Operator Route	Location	Image	Remarks	Working
17 008	—	1911	BMAG; 4760	Deutsches Technikmuseum Berlin (DTMB)		DTMB Berlin		Prussian S 10, Breslau 1008, sectioned	Museum locomotive

==== Class 17.10 ====
Class 17.10 was assigned to the Prussian S 10^{1}.

Running no.	EDP- No.	Built	Manufacturer Factory no.	Owner	Operator Route	Location	Image	Remarks	Working
17 1055	—	1913	Henschel; 11512	Dresden Transport Museum		Dresden outside depot (not accessible)		Prussian S 10.1, Posen 1107, badged as Osten 1135	Museum locomotive

=== Class 18 ===
The Deutsche Reichsbahn grouped those express train, tender locomotives with an axle arrangement of 2'C1' (Pacific), taken over from the state railways, into Class 18. In addition, locomotive number 18 201 is also included in this class. The remaining locomotives in the Deutsche Reichsbahn (East Germany) incorporated into Class 02 on the change-over to computerised numbers.

==== Class 18.3 ====
The class IV h locomotives of the Grand Duchy of Baden State Railway (Deutsche Reichsbahn Class 18.3) are express locomotives with an axle arrangement of 2'C1' (Pacific).

Running no.	EDP- No.	Built	Manufacturer Factory no.	Owner	Operator Route	Location	Image	Remarks	Working
18 314	02 0314-1	1919 / 1960	J. A. Maffei; 5089 / RAW Zwickau	ATM		ATM, Sinsheim		Ex Baden IV h, DR rebuild, oil-fired	Museum locomotive
18 316	018 316-0	1919	J. A. Maffei; 5091	Technoseum		Technoseum, Mannheim		Ex Baden IV h	Museum locomotive
18 323	018 323-6	1920	J. A. Maffei; 5109	Nuremberg Transport Museum		Offenburg High School, Badstrasse		Ex Baden IV h, ex Baden State Railway No. 1011	Monument

==== Class 18.4–5 ====
The steam locomotives of Bavarian class S 3/6, DRG Class 18.4–5, were express locomotives with the axle arrangement 4-6-2 (Pacific).

Running no.	EDP- No.	Built	Manufacturer Factory no.	Owner	Operator Route	Location	Image	Remarks	Working
18 427		1914	J. A. Maffei; 3441	DGEG		Bochum-Dahlhausen Railway Museum		Bavarian S 3/6g; ex Palatinate Railway No. 343, restored remnant (boiler section)	Museum locomotive
18 451		1912	J. A. Maffei; 3315	DM		DM Munich		Bavarian S 3/6e No. 3634; the only preserved S 3/6 with 2-metre driving wheels	Museum locomotive
18 478		1918	J. A. Maffei; 4536	BEM		BEM Nördlingen		Bavarian S 3/6i No. 3673, original boiler, general inspection April 2004	Museum locomotive
18 505	018 505-8	1924	J. A. Maffei; 5555	DGEG		Neustadt/Weinstraße Railway Museum, Neustadt/Weinstraße		Bavarian S 3/6k, No. 3706;	Museum locomotive
18 528		1928	J. A. Maffei; 5696	Krauss-Maffei		Werksmuseum; Allach		Bavarian S 3/6m, not accessible to the public	Monument

==== Class 18.6 (DB) ====
In the 1950s the Deutsche Bundesbahn carried out a modernisation of much of its locomotive fleet. This included the conversion of 30 examples of Class 18.5 by the firms of Krauss-Maffei and Henschel. This involved the Reichsbahn locomotives procured roughly between 1927 and 1930 of Bavarian S 3/6 series l to o, that were reclassified into DB Class 18.6.

Running no.	EDP- No.	Built	Manufacturer Factory no.	Owner	Operator Route	Location	Image	Remarks	Working
18 612		1927	J. A. Maffei; 5672	DDM		DDM, Neuenmarkt		Ex Bavarian S 3/6m, ex 18 520 with new boiler	Museum locomotive

==== 18 201 ====
Locomotive number 18 201 of the Deutsche Reichsbahn (East Germany) emerged in 1961 at the Reichsbahnausbesserungswerk Meiningen as a conversion of the Henschel-Wegmann train locomotive, number 61 002, the tender of 44 468 and parts of H 45 024.

Running no.	EDP- No.	Built	Manufacturer Factory no.	Owner	Operator Route	Location	Image	Remarks	Working
18 201	02 0201-0	1939 / 1961	Henschel; 22501 / RAW Meiningen	Christian Goldschagg (private)	Dampf Plus GmbH	BW Lutherstadt Wittenberg		Rebuilt DR, ex 61 002, oil-fired, additional tender for long runs (2'2' T 34); DBAG 088 025-2	Yes

=== Class 19 ===
The DRG Class 19 were eight-coupled express train tender locomotives with a 1′D1′ axle arrangement taken over from the Royal Saxon State Railways.

Running no.	EDP- No.	Built	Manufacturer Factory no.	Owner	Operator Route	Location	Image	Remarks	Working
19 017	04 1017-5	1922	Hartmann; 4523	Dresden Transport Museum		Dresden Transport Museum, Dresden		Ex Saxon XX HV, Saxon State Railways No. 207, DR heritage locomotive, 4 cylinders	Museum locomotive

=== Class 22 ===
The Class 22 were passenger train locomotives with the Deutsche Reichsbahn in East Germany, that were converted from former 39.0-2 engines between 1958 and 1962, as part of the reconstruction programme and were renumbered in 1970 under the new computer-generated numbering scheme back to Class 39.10. Several Class 22 boilers were also reused for Class 03.10 locomotives.

Running no.	EDP- No.	Built	Manufacturer Factory no.	Owner	Operator Route	Location	Image	Remarks	Working
22 029	39 1029-6	1924	Linke; 2925	BEM		BEM, Nördlingen		Rekolok, ex 39 197, ex steam generator at Stendal, used for spares	No
22 047		1924	Linke; 2910	Bernd Falz (private)		BW Falkenberg/Elster		Rekolok, ex DRG 39 172	No
22 064		1924	Henschel; 20616 / 80	BEM		BEM, Nördlingen		Rekolok, ex 39 165, Rekolok 1960 RAW Meiningen, ex steam generator at Meiningen	Museum locomotive
22 066		1923	Borsig; 11636 / 82	Bernd Falz (private)		EM Hermeskeil		Rekolok, ex 39 033, Rekolok 1960 RAW Meiningen, ex steam generator at Magdeburg and Staßfurt	Museum locomotive
22 073		1924	Henschel; 20183	Bernd Falz (private)		BW Falkenberg/Elster		Rekolok, ex DRG 39 132, steam generator	No

=== Class 23 ===
The DRG had two examples of the DRG Class 23 Einheitslokomotive built, but it was not until after the Second World War that it went into series production with an improved design as the DB Class 23 and DR Class 23.10.

==== Class 23 DB ====
Running no.	EDP- No.	Built	Manufacturer Factory no.	Owner	Operator Route	Location	Image	Remarks	Working
23 019	023 019-3	1952	Jung; 11474	DDM		DDM, Neuenmarkt			Museum locomotive
23 029	023 029-2	1952	Jung; 11474	Ostalbkreis		Aalen trade school centre			Monument
23 042	023 042-5	1954	Henschel; 28542	Darmstadt-Kranichstein Railway Museum (DKRM)	Deutsche Museumseisenbahn GmbH	DKRM, Darmstadt			Yes
23 058	023 058-1	1955	Krupp; 3446	Eurovapor, German section		SEH, Heilbronn			Yes
23 105	023 105-0	1959	Jung; 13113	Deutsche Bahn	South German Railway Museum (SEH)	SEH, Heilbronn		Last steam engine delivered to the DB; damaged in the major fire on 17 October 2005, on loan for 10 years to SEH for (optical) restoration	No

==== Class 23.10 ====
In the course of the changeover to computerised numbers the Class 23.10 became Class 35.10.

Running no.	EDP- No.	Built	Manufacturer Factory no.	Owner	Operator Route	Location	Image	Remarks	Working
23 1019	35 1019-5	1958	LKM B 123019	LDC		BW Cottbus		Former monument at Hoyerswerda	Yes
23 1021	35 1021-1	1958	LKM B 123021	Oldtimer Museum Rügen		Oldtimer Museum, Prora, Rügen			Museum locomotive
23 1028	35 1028-6	1958	LKM B 123028	GeBaCo GmbH		BW Gera		Ex-steam generator, body of boiler and axles	No
23 1074	35 1074-0	1959	LKM B 123074	GeBaCo GmbH		BW Gera		Ex-steam generator	No
23 1097	35 1097-1	1959	LKM B 123097	IG 58 3047		BW Glauchau		General inspection 2 June 2007	Yes
23 1113	35 1113-6	1959	LKM B 123113	Deutsche Bahn		BW Nossen		Last steam engine of this class delivered to the DR	Museum locomotive

=== Class 24 ===
The locomotives of the Class 24 were standard passenger train locomotives with the Deutsche Reichsbahn.

Running no.	EDP- No.	Built	Manufacturer Factory no.	Owner	Operator Route	Location	Image	Remarks	Working
24 004	37 1004-3	1928	Schichau; 3119	Dresden Transport Museum		Dresden outside depot (inaccessible)		Ex-DR heritage locomotive	No
24 009	37 1009-2	1928	Schichau; 3124	Eisenbahn-Kurier Historic Steam Trips	BW Gelsenkirchen-Bismarck				No
24 083		1938	Schichau; 3323	Dampfzug Betriebs Gemeinschaft e.V.	Hildesheim - Loburg	BW Loburg		Ex-PKP Oi2-22	Yes

=== Class 34 ===
In Class 34 of the Deutsche Reichsbahn are grouped state railway, passenger train tender locomotives with an axle arrangement of 1'B.

==== Class 34.742-744 ====
Class B IX of the Royal Bavarian State Railways were the first express locomotives in Bavaria.

Running no.	EDP- No.	Built	Manufacturer Factory no.	Owner	Operator Route	Location	Image	Remarks	Working
		1874	Maffei / 1000	DM		Freilassing Locomotive World, Freilassing		ex K.Bay.Sts.B. 634, sectioned for display	Museum locomotive

=== Class 35 ===
On the introduction of computerised numbering in 1970, the Deutsche Reichsbahn (East Germany) grouped all its Class 23.10 steam engines into Class 35, renumbering them accordingly..

=== Class 38 ===
The Deutsche Reichsbahn grouped all the passenger train tender locomotives with two leading carrying axles and three coupled axles taken over from the state railways, into its Class 38.

==== Class 38.2–3 ====
The class 38.2–3 contained the Saxon XII H2.

Running no.	EDP- No.	Built	Manufacturer Factory no.	Owner	Operator Route	Location	DBAG BR 088	Image	Remarks	Working
38 205	38 5205-0	1910	Hartmann; 3387	Deutsche Bahn	Saxon Railway Museum(SEM)	SEM, Chemnitz-Hilbersdorf	088 386-8		Saxon 656, later, 3656	Museum locomotive

==== Class 38.10–40 ====
The class 38.10–40 contained the Prussian P 8.

Running no.	EDP- No.	Built	Manufacturer Factory no.	Owner	Operator Route	Location	DBAG BR 088	Image	Remarks	Working
38 1182	38 1182-5	1910	BMAG; 4485	Deutsche Bahn	BSW East Thuringian railway hub	Railworld Gera	088 385-0		Oldest preserved Prussian P 8 in Germany, Former DR heritage locomotive, lifting link gear, ex Frankfurt 2421	Museum locomotive
38 1444		1910	Linke; 2922	Alstom LHB Museum		Alstom, Salzgitter			Ex-Hannover 2412	Museum locomotive
38 1772	038 772-0	1915	Schichau; 2275	W. Greiffenberger (private)	EFB	AW Siegen			Ex-Königsberg 2458, last P 8 in the DB, licence expired 1993	Museum locomotive
38 2267	38 2267-3	1918	Henschel; 15695	DGEG		Bochum-Dahlhausen Railway Museum			Ex-2553 Erfurt	Yes
38 2383	038 382-8	1919	Henschel; 16539	DDM		DDM, Neuenmarkt			Ex-Elberfeld 2535	Museum locomotive
38 2425		1919	Schichau; 2739	Deutsches Technikmuseum Berlin (DTMB)		Berlin Anhalter Bf			Ex-Stettin 2536, ex Danzig 2441, ex PKP Ok 1-296	Museum locomotive
38 2460		1919	Linke; 1804	Manuel Jußen (private)	Länderbahnreisen Manuel Jußen	Dieringhausen Railway Museum, Dieringhausen			Posen 2455, ex CFR 230.094, DRG	Yes
38 2884	038 884-3	1920	Vulcan; 3641	Deutsche Bahn		Nuremberg Transport Museum, Nuremberg			KED Stettin 2517	Not known
38 3180		1921	Linke, Breslau; 2257	Bavarian Railway Museum (BEM)		BEM Nördlingen			Ex-KED Halle 2586, ex CFR 230.105	Museum locomotive
38 3199		1921	Linke, Breslau; 2276	South German Railway Museum (SEH)		SEH, Heilbronn			Ex-KED 2580 Elberfeld, Breslau, CFR 230.106, general inspection 05/02	Yes
38 3650	038 650-8	1922	Borsig; 11419	Real Center (private)		Böblingen car park			Ex-KED Elberfeld 3097	Monument
38 3711	038 711-8	1922	Hohenzollern; 4255	Möbel Hesse (private)		Garbsen-Berenbostel, car park			Ex-KED Hannover 2591	Monument
38 3999		1923	Schichau; 2998	Darmstadt-Kranichstein Railway Museum (EMD-K)	Deutsche Museumseisenbahn	EMD-K, Darmstadt-Kranichstein			Ex-CFR 230.110, ex KPEV Hannover 2676	Not known

=== Class 39 ===
The Deutsche Reichsbahn arranged the tender-equipped passenger train locomotives of the Prussian state railways Class P 10 into DRG Class 39 .

Running no.	EDP- No.	Built	Manufacturer Factory no.	Owner	Operator Route	Location	DBAG BR 088	Image	Remarks	Working
39 184		1924	Linke, Breslau; 2922	Alstom LHB Museum		Alstom, Salzgitter				Museum locomotive
39 230		1923	MBG K 2308	Nuremberg Transport Museum		DDM, Neuenmarkt			Prussian P 10, lifting link gear	Museum locomotive

=== Class 41 ===
The Class 41 were standard goods train locomotives with the Deutsche Reichsbahn. The computer numbers 042 were for DB locomotives of the Class 41 with oil-firing, but not grouped with Class 42.

Running no.	EDP- No.	Built	Manufacturer Factory no.	Owner	Operator Route	Location	DBAG BR 088	Image	Remarks	Working
41 018	042 018-2	1939	Henschel; 24320	Munich Steam Locomotive Company (MSLC)	IGE-Bahntouristik/ MSLC	Augsburg Railway Park, Augsburg			Oil-fired	Yes
41 024	042 024-0	1939	Henschel; 24326	Darmstadt-Kranichstein Railway Museum (EMD-K)	Deutsche Museumseisenbahn	EMD-K, Darmstadt-Kranichstein			Oil-fired	Museum locomotive
41 025	41 1025-0	1939	Henschel; 24327	Bernd Falz (private)		EM Hermeskeil			Rekolok	Museum locomotive
41 052	042 052-1	1939	Henschel; 24354			Osnabrück-Piesberg			Currently being restored	No
41 073	042 073-7	1939	Borsig; 14794	Club 41073		BW Haltingen			Currently being restored, high performance boiler (1961), oil-fired	No
41 096	042 096-8	1939	Krupp; 1918	DG 41 096	Warnetalbahn	Klein Mahner			Oil-fired, rebuilt 1960,	Yes
41 113	042 113-1	1938	Krupp; 1935	Sinsheim Auto & Technik Museum (ATM)		ATM, Sinsheim			Oil-fired, new-type boiler	Museum locomotive
41 125	41 1125-8	1938	BMAG; 11064	Bernd Falz (private)		BW Falkenberg/Elster			Rekolok	No
41 137	41 1137-3	1939	Schichau; 3343	Bernd Falz (private)		EM Hermeskeil			Rekolok	Museum locomotive
41 144	41 1144-9	1939	Schichau; 3350	IGEW		Bw Eisenach			Rekolok with tender 2'2'T32 or 2'2'T34	Yes
41 150	41 1150-6	1939	Schichau; 3356	Bavarian Railway Museum (BEM)	Romantic Rails (Romantische Schiene)	BEM, Nördlingen			Rekolok	Yes
41 185	41 1185-2	1939	O&K; 13177	Nuremberg Transport Museum (NTM)		NTM, Halle branch	088 415		Rekolok	Museum locomotive
41 186	042 186-7	1938	ME; 4357	Dieringhausen Railway Museum (DRM)		DRM, Dieringhausen			Oil-fired, new-type boiler	Museum locomotive
41 225	41 1225-6	1940	Henschel; 24792	Saxon Railway Museum (SEM)		SEM, Chemnitz-Hilbersdorf			Rekolok	Museum locomotive
41 226	042 226-1	1938	Henschel; 24793			DDMM Tuttlingen			Oil-fired, new-type boiler (1961)	
41 231	41 1231-4	1939	Borsig; 14812	Traditionsbetriebswerk Staßfurt	Salzland-Express	TBW Staßfurt			Rekolok	No
41 271	042 271-7	1940	Borsig; 14850	Rendsburger Eisenbahnfreunde		BW Neumünster			Oil-fired, displayed as 042 271-7	Museum locomotive
41 289	41 1289-2	1939	Schichau; 3377	Bernd Falz (private)		BW Falkenberg/Elster			Rekolok	No
41 303	41 1303-1	1939	Jung; 8692	Hei Na Ganzlin		Röbel/Müritz			Rekolok, rebuilt as steam generator; no cylinders or valve gear	No
41 360	042 360-8	1940	Jung; 9318	Dampflok-Tradition Oberhausen		BW Osterfeld (Oberhausen)			Oil-fired	Yes
41 364	042 364-0	1941	Jung; 9322	Munich Steam Locomotive Company		Augsburg Railway Park, Augsburg			Oil-fired, new-type boiler (1961)	Museum locomotive

=== Class 42 ===
The goods train locomotives of the Class 42 built from 1943 onwards were the second, heavy class of so-called war locomotives (Kriegslokomotiven) (KDL 2), intended for duties on routes that were cleared for a higher axle load. Further locomotives were built and sold by LOFAG after the war.

Running no.	EDP- No.	Built	Manufacturer Factory no.	Owner	Operator Route	Location	DBAG BR 088	Image	Remarks	Working
42 1504		1944	Esslingen; 4874	Technikmuseum Speyer (TMS)		TMS, Speyer			Ex-PKP Ty 43-137, ex HE, ex DRG	Museum locomotive
42 2754		1949	LOFAG; 17640	Bernd Falz (private)		EM Hermeskeil			Ex-BDŽ 16.15, ex ÖGEG, formerly a monument at Bender Leverkusen-Opladen	Museum locomotive
42 2768		1949	LOFAG; 17654	Bavarian Railway Museum (BEM)		BEM, Nördlingen			Ex-BDŽ 16.16	Museum locomotive

=== Class 43 ===
The Class 43 was the second Reichsbahn locomotive class to be built on standard locomotive (Einheitslok) principles. These two-cylinder locomotives were delivered by Henschel and Schwartzkopff. Several DB Class 44 locomotives were also given computer numbers beginning with 043, but were not part of DRG Class 43.

Running no.	EDP- No.	Built	Manufacturer Factory no.	Owner	Operator Route	Location	DBAG BR 088	Image	Remarks	Working
43 001		1927	Henschel; 20726	Dresden Transport Museum		Saxon Railway Museum (SEM), Chemnitz-Hilbersdorf			Ex heritage locomotive at Bw Cottbus	Museum locomotive

=== Class 44 ===
The Class 44 were standard goods train, steam locomotives with three cylinder engines. Both the DB and the East German DR converted some of the engines to oil-firing, the DB ones being recognisable from their 043 computerised numbers. 20 DR locomotives were fitted with the Wendler coal-dust firing system. Several DR locomotives were used as heating engines after being reconverted from oil to coal, but were not given 'coal numbers'; here the last known EDP running number is listed.

Running no.	EDP- No.	Built	Manufacturer Factory no.	Owner	Operator Route	Location	DBAG BR 088	Image	Remarks	Working
44 100	043 100-7	1939	Henschel; 24269	Sinsheim Auto & Technik Museum (ATM)		ATM, Sinsheim			Oil-fired	Museum locomotive
44 105	44 2105-3	1938	Krupp; 1879	Bernd Falz (private)		BW Falkenberg			Oil-fired locomotive 44 0105-5, ex Dsp Bw Weißenfels, inside cylinder and gear dismantled	No
44 167	44 2167-3	1938	BMAG; 10882	Bernd Falz (private)		EM Hermeskeil			Oil-fired locomotive 44 0167-5, reconverted to grate firing	Museum locomotive (?)
44 177	44 2177-2	1940	Krupp; 1997	Bernd Falz (private)		EM Hermeskeil			Ex-PmH Bw Eisenach, oil-fired locomotive 44 0177-4 (1982 rebuilt PmH, grate-fired)	Museum locomotive (?)
44 196	44 2196-2	1940	Krupp; 2018	Bernd Falz (private)		EM Hermeskeil			Ex-Dsp Est. Guben, Wagner smoke deflectors, oil-fired locomotive 44 0196-4, reconverted to grate-firing	Museum locomotive (?)
44 225	44 2225-9	1939	Schwartzkopff; 11279	LDC		BW Cottbus			Rebuilt to oil, coal, 44 0225-1, cylinder damage	No
44 264	44 2264-8	1940	Schichau; 3390	Bernd Falz (private)		EM Hermeskeil			Partly dismantled (no boiler), rebuilt to oil-firing, coal, 44 0264-0	Museum locomotive (?)
44 276	044 276-4	1940	Krauss-Maffei; 15745	DDM		DDM Neuenmarkt			Coal-fired	Museum locomotive
44 351	44 2351-3	1941	Borsig; 15032			Imprägnierwerk Wülknitz			Rebuilt to oil-firing, coal, 44 0351-5	Monument
44 381	043 381-3	1941	ME; 4446	Sommer Metall und Gußwerke Co. (private)		Bavarian Railway Museum (BEM), Nördlingen			Oil-fired	Museum locomotive
44 389	044 389-5	1941	Henschel; 25998			Altenbeken			Coal-fired	Monument
44 394	44 2394-3	1941	Henschel; 26003	Bernd Falz (private)		BW Falkenberg			Former steam generator	No
44 397	44 2397-6	1941	Henschel; 26006	Rügen Railway & Technology Museum (Rügen RTM)		Rügen RTM, Prora			Rebuilt to oil-firing, coal, 44 0397-8	Museum locomotive
44 404	044 404-2	1941	Henschel; 26013	Darmstadt-Kranichstein Railway Museum (DKRM)	Deutsche Museumseisenbahn	DKRM, Darmstadt-Kranichstein			Coal-fired, Riggenbach counter-pressure brake	Museum locomotive
44 434	044 434-9	1941	Henschel; 26043	Bernd Falz (private)		EM Hermeskeil			with Schürze	Museum locomotive (?)
44 481	044 481-0	1941	Henschel; 26090	Rheinmetall Landsysteme		Henschelplatz 1 34127 Kassel			Coal-fired	Monument
44 500	44 0500-7	1941	Krauss-Maffei; 16105	Bernd Falz (private)		EM Hermeskeil			Ex-PmH, Rebuilt to oil, coal	Museum locomotive (?)
44 508	044 508-0	1941	Krauss-Maffei; 16113	Nuremberg Transport Museum	Westerwälder Eisenbahnfreunde 44 508 e.V.	Westerburg			Coal-fired	No
44 546	44 2546-8	1941	Krauss-Maffei; 16151	Bavarian Railway Museum (BEM)		BEM, Nördlingen			Rebuilt to oil-firing, coal, 44 0546-0	Museum locomotive
44 594	044 594-0	1941	Krupp; 2242	Dampflokfreunde Salzwedel (private)		Salzwedel			Coal-fired	Museum locomotive
44 606	043 606-3	1941	Krupp; 2254	Munich Steam Locomotive Company		Augsburg Railway Park, Augsburg			Badged as 44 606	Museum locomotive
44 635	44 0635-1	1941	Schichau; 3460	Bernd Falz (private)		EM Hermeskeil			Ex-PmH Bw Eisenach, oil-fired locomotive 44 0635-1 (rebuilt PmH, grate-fired)	Museum locomotive (?)
44 663	44 2663-1	1941	Borsig; 15119	Traditionsbetriebswerk Staßfurt		TBW Staßfurt			Rebuilt to oil-firing, coal, 44 0663-3	No
44 687	44 2687-0	1941	LOFAG; 9274	WAB		BW Altenbeken			Rebuilt to oil-firing, coal, 44 0687-2	No
44 903	043 903-4	1943	Batignolles-Châtillon; 695	Arbeitskreis monument e.V.		Emden station forecourt			Oil-fired	Monument
44 1040	44 0040-4	1942	LOFAG; 9396	Bernd Falz (private)		EM Hermeskeil			Ex-PmH 8, rebuilt to oil-firing, coal	Museum locomotive (?)
44 1056	44 1056-9	1942	LOFAG; 9412	Bernd Falz (private)		EM Hermeskeil			Ex-PmH, oil-fired locomotive 44 0056-0, (rebuilt PmH, grate-fired)	Museum locomotive (?)
44 1093	44 0093-3	1942	LOFAG; 9449	Deutsche Bahn	Förderverein BW Arnstadt	EM BW Arnstadt	088 445		Rebuilt to oil-firing, coal (44 1093-2), Öl	Museum locomotive
44 1106	44 1106-2	1942	Borsig; 15155	Bernd Falz (private)		EM Hermeskeil			Wagner smoke deflectors, ex heating engine BW Cottbus, rebuilt to oil-firing, coal, 44 0106-3	Museum locomotive (?)
44 1182	44 1182-3	1942	Krupp; 2684	Traditionsbetriebswerk Staßfurt		TBW Staßfurt			Rebuilt to oil-firing, coal, 44 0182-4	No
44 1203	043 196-5	1942	Krupp; 2705	Stadt Salzbergen		Bahnhof Salzbergen			Oil-fired	Monument
44 1251	44 1251-6	1942	Borsig; 15237	Bernd Falz (private)		EM Hermeskeil			Wagner smoke deflectors, 2 cylinders, ex heating engine at Guben, rebuilt to oil, coal, 44 0251-7	Museum locomotive
44 1315	043 315-1	1943	Krupp; 2737	Stadt Kornwestheim	South German Railway Museum (SEH)	SEH, Heilbronn			Oil-fired, on loan until 2015	No
44 1338	44 0338-2	1942	Krupp; 2760	Saxon Railway Museum (SEM)		SEM Chemnitz-Hilbersdorf			Rebuilt to oil-firing, coal, ex PmH 10 Bw Eisenach, locomotive given in 1999 tender 2´2´T31 (ex P 10, ex oil wagon Bw Eisenach)	Museum locomotive
44 1377	044 377-0	1942	Krupp; 2799	DGEG		Bochum-Dahlhausen Railway Museum			Coal-fired	Museum locomotive
44 1378	44 1378-7	1942	Krupp; 2800	South German Railway Museum (SEH)		SEH, Heilbronn			Rebuilt to oil-firing, coal, 44 0378-8	Museum locomotive
44 1412	44 1412-4	1942	Schichau; 3604	Bernd Falz (private)		EM Hermeskeil			Inside cylinder removed, rebuilt to oil-firing, coal, 44 0412-5	Museum locomotive (?)
44 1486	44 1486-8	1943	Creusot; 4728	Traditionsbetriebswerk Staßfurt	Salzland-Express	TBW Staßfurt			Rebuilt to oil-firing, coal, 44 0486-9	No
44 1489	44 0489-3	1943	Creusot; 4731	South German Railway Museum (SEH)		SEH, Heilbronn			Rebuilt to oil-firing, coal, ex PmH	No
44 1537	44 1537-8	1942	Borsig; 15376	Bernd Falz (private)		EM Hermeskeil			Ex-heating engine at Guben, rebuilt to oil-firing, coal, 44 0537-9	Museum locomotive (?)
44 1558	044 556-9	1942	Borsig; 15397	Joachim Schmidt Stiftung	Historische Eisenbahn Gelsenkirchen	BW Gelsenkirchen-Bismarck			Coal-fired, formerly a monument at Hamm	Museum locomotive
44 1616	44 1616-0	1943	Krenau; 1104	Manfred Welzel (private)	UEF	Stored at SEH, Heilbronn, since May 8			Coal-fired, ÜK locomotive, rebuilt to oil-firing, coal, general inspection planned, 44 0616-1	No
44 1681	043 681-6	1941	Schichau; 3633	Dieringhausen Railway Museum (DRM)		DRM, Dieringhausen			Oil-fired, stored in the open	No

=== Class 45 ===
The Class 45 locomotives, built by the firm of Henschel between 1936 and 1937, were the most powerful, standard goods train locomotives in the Deutsche Reichsbahn.

Running no.	EDP- No.	Built	Manufacturer Factory no.	Owner	Operator Route	Location	DBAG BR 088	Image	Remarks	Working
45 010	045 010-6	1941	Henschel; 24803	Deutsche Bahn		Nuremberg Transport Museum, Nuremberg			Damaged in the major fire on 17 October 2005; stored at Meiningen Steam Locomotive Works	Museum locomotive

=== Class 50 ===
The Deutsche Reichsbahn built more Class 50 standard, goods train locomotives than any other class of engine. A total of 3,164 were built between 1939 and 1948.

Running no.	EDP- No.	Built	Manufacturer Factory no.	Owner	Operator Route	Location	DBAG BR 088	Image	Remarks	Working
50 001	050 001-7	1939	Henschel; 24355	Deutsches Technikmuseum Berlin (DTMB)		DTMB, Berlin			Wagner smoke deflectors	Museum locomotive
50 413	050 413-4	1940	BMAG; 11411	Auto- and Technikmuseum Sinsheim (ATM)		ATM, Sinsheim			Cabin tender	Museum locomotive
50 607	050 607-1	1940	Henschel; 25826	Bernd Falz (private)		EM Hermeskeil			ÜK boiler and driver’s cab	Museum locomotive
50 622	050 622-0	1940	Henschel; 25841	Deutsche Bahn		Nuremberg Transport Museum, Nuremberg			Frame of 50 133; damaged in the major fire on 17 October 2005, future unclear	Museum locomotive
50 685		1940	LOFAG; 3405	Technikmuseum Speyer (TMS)		TMS Speyer			Ex ÖBB 50.685	No
50 778	050 778-0	1941	Henschel; 25862	Bavarian Railway Museum (BEM)		BEM, Nördlingen			Cabin tender	Museum locomotive
50 794	050 794-7	1941	Henschel; 25878	Mörchenpark Tolk-Schau		Tolk				Museum locomotive
50 849	50 1849-4	1939	Krauss-Maffei; 16058	Nuremberg Transport Museum Nürnberg	IG 58 3047	BW Glauchau			Wagner smoke deflectors	Museum locomotive
50 904	050 904-2	1940	Krupp; 2365	Private	BSW Gruppe Lichtenfels	BW Lichtenfels			Cabin tender, being restored	No
50 955	50 1955-9	1941	Krupp; 2320	Bavarian Railway Museum (BEM)		BEM, Nördlingen			Partly dismantled, used for spare parts	No
50 975	050 975-2	1941	Krupp; 2340	German Steam Locomotive Museum (DDM)		DDM, Neuenmarkt				Museum locomotive
50 1446	051 446-3	1941	Henschel; 26256	Bernd Falz (private)		EM Hermeskeil				No
50 1650	051 650-0	1942	Krauss-Maffei; 16193			Bahnhof Aulendorf			With Krenau boiler from 50 2868 and 52 5263	No
50 1724	051 724-3	1941	Krupp; 2564	Jörg Seyffert (private)	EFB	AW Siegen			Original design	Museum locomotive
50 1832	051 832-4	1941	BMAG; 11730	Bernd Falz (private)		EM Hermeskeil			ÜK boiler, tub tender	No
50 2404	052 404-1	1942	Krauss-Maffei; 16279	Freunde des Bahnbetriebswerkes Gelsenkirchen-Bismarck e.V.	-	BW Gelsenkirchen-Bismarck			1958 general inspection at AW Schwerte: Henschel steam boiler no. 26 637, Henschel undercarriage No. 24 635, Henschel tender No. 26 393 1962 AW Lingen: Cabin tender	No
50 2652		1943	Ostrow; 415	Kaiserslautern		BW Kaiserslautern				Monument
50 2740	50 2740-4	1942	Henschel; 26808	Private		UEF Albtal			Periodically in service as "DB 052 740-8"	Yes
50 2838	052 838-0	1943	Krauss-Maffei; 16355			DDMM Tuttlingen			Rebuilt boiler from 52 143	
50 2988	052 988-3	1942	LOFAG; 9575	Wutachtalbahn e.V.	Wutach Valley Railway	BW Fützen				Yes
50 3014	50 3014-3	1942	ME; 4505	Bernd Falz (private)		EM Hermeskeil			Wagner smoke deflectors, Übergangskriegslokomotive	No
50 3031	053 031-1	1942	ME; 4522	South German Railway Museum (SEH)		SEH, Heilbronn			Formerly a monument at Linde, cabin tender	No
50 3075	053 075-8	1943	O&K; 14201	DGEG		Bochum-Dahlhausen Railway Museum			Formerly a monument at Ratingen, with BMAG boiler from 52 6211 and 50 2719, modified driver’s cab, tub tender	Museum locomotive

==== Class 50.35 ====
Between 1958 and 1962 the Deutsche Reichsbahn (East Germany) had 208 locomotives of Class 50 fitted with newly designed boilers with a mixer-preheater, larger evaporative heating areas and improved suction draught. They were given the designation Class 50.35 and running numbers 50 3501 - 50 3708. Some time later, several locomotives of the series were also converted to oil-firing (BR 50.50) and renumbered to DR "50 00xx-x".

Running no.	EDP- No.	Built	Manufacturer Factory no.	Owner	Operator Route	Location	DBAG BR 088	Image	Remarks	Working
50 3501	50 3501-9	1940	Borsig; 14970	Meiningen Steam Locomotive Works		Meiningen Steam Locomotive Works, Meiningen			Ex 50 380, with Knorr preheater, Wagner smoke deflectors	Yes
50 3517	50 3517-5	1941	MBA; 13548			BW Falkenberg			Ex 50 1286	No
50 3518	50 3518-3	1940	Schichau; 3433	Bernd Falz (private)		BW Falkenberg			Ex 50 1008	No
50 3522	50 3522-2	1941	Borsig; 15083	Hei Na Ganzlin		Röbel/Müritz			Ex 50 1368	
50 3539	50 3539-9	1942	Henschel; 26604	UEF		Albtal			Ex 50 2273	No
50 3545	50 3545-6	1942	ME; 4460	DBK HB		BW Crailsheim			Ex 50 1385, retired from the DB as 050 545-3	Yes
50 3552	50 3552-2	1942	BMAG; 11630	ME Hanau		BW Hanau			Ex 50 1336, reconstruction RAW Stendal 1959	Yes
50 3553	50 3553-0	1939	Krauss-Maffei; 15754	Bernd Falz (private)		EM Hermeskeil			Ex 50 235	
50 3555	50 3555-5	1942	LOFAG; 9582	Bernd Falz (private)		EM Hermeskeil			Ex 50 2995	
50 3556	50 3556-3	1941	Henschel; 26299	Traditionsbetriebswerk Staßfurt	Salzland-Express	TBW Staßfurt			Ex 50 1489	No
50 3557	50 3557-1	1942	Krauss-Maffei; 16251	Bernd Falz (private)		BW Falkenberg			Ex DRG 50 2376	No
50 3559	50 3559-7	1942	Henschel; 26276			Karl-Schurz Strasse, Liblar			Ex-50 1486, reconstructed 05/59, last standard gauge steam loco in the DR	Monument
50 3562	50 3562-1	1941	Schichau; 3483	Förderverein Dampflok Weyhe		BW Kirchweyhe			Ex 50 1782	Monument
50 3568	50 3568-8	1941	Krupp; 2568	Bernd Falz (private)		BW Falkenberg			Ex DRG 50 1728	No
50 3576	50 3576-1	1941	Škoda Works; 1185	Nassauische Touristikbahn	Aartalbahn	Wiesbaden-Dotzheim			Ex 50 1106	Yes
50 3580	50 3580-3	1939	Krauss-Maffei; 15764		Eisenbahnfreunde Zollernbahn	BW Rottweil			Ex 50 245, wrongly badged, runs as 50 245, Wagner smoke deflectors	No
50 3600	50 3600-9	1941	Henschel; 25859	Bavarian Railway Museum (BEM)		BEM, Nördlingen			Ex 50 775, general inspection planned	No
50 3606	50 3606-6	1942	BMAG; 11887	Private		TBW Staßfurt			Ex 50 2637	No
50 3610	50 3610-8	1941	Schichau; 3469	EFO		Dieringhausen Railway Museum, Dieringhausen			Ex 50 1768, general inspection due 12/07	Yes
50 3616	50 3616-5	1940	Schichau; 3415	VSE		BW Schwarzenberg			Ex 50 453	No
50 3624	50 3624-9	1942	DWM Posen; 402	Dampflokfreunde Salzwedel (private)		BW Salzwedel			Ex 50 2228	No
50 3626	50 3626-4	1938	Krauss-Maffei; 16260	Thüringer Eisenbahnverein Weimar		BW Weimar			Ex-50 2385	Museum locomotive
50 3628	50 3628-0	1942	ME; 4490	(Private)		Saxon Railway Museum (SEM) Chemnitz-Hilbersdorf			Ex 50 2678, Übergangskriegslok	Museum locomotive
50 3631	50 3631-4	1940	Borsig; 14891	Bernd Falz (private)		BW Falkenberg			Ex DRG 50 160	No
50 3635	50 3635-5	1941	Henschel; 26303	Bernd Falz (private)		BW Falkenberg			Ex DRG 50 1493	No
50 3636	50 3636-3	1941	O&K; 13535	GES		Stuttgart			Ex 50 996, general inspection 05/06	Yes
50 3638	50 3638-9	1941	Henschel; 26247	Hei Na Ganzlin		Röbel/Müritz			Ex 50 1437, being restored	No
50 3642	50 3642-1	1941	BMAG; 11600	Bernd Falz (private)		BW Falkenberg			Ex DRG 50 1306	No
50 3648	50 3648-8	1941	Krupp; 2332	Saxon Railway Museum (SEM)		Saxon Railway Museum (SEM) Chemnitz-Hilbersdorf			Ex 50 967	Yes
50 3649	50 3649-6	1942	BMAG; 11932	Bernd Falz (private)		EM Hermeskeil			Ex 50 2876	
50 3655	50 3655-3	1942	Borsig; 15214	Eisenbahn-Tradition	Teuto-Express	BW Lengerich (Westfalen)			Ex 50 2220	Yes
50 3658	50 3658-7	1940	Krupp; 2362			Golf course at Wattenheim			Ex 50 901	Monument
50 3662	50 3662-9	1940	LOFAG; 9183	Bernd Falz (private)		EM Hermeskeil			Ex 50 249	
50 3670	50 3670-2	1940	Škoda Works	Klings family (private)	Nostalgie-Express Berlin e.V.	Vienna				Museum locomotive
50 3673	50 3673-6	1941	Borsig; 15062	Museo Ferroviario del Verbano (IT)	Museo Ferroviario del Verbano (IT)				Ex 50 1347	Yes
50 3680	50 3680-1	1940	Henschel; 24716			Linde			Ex 50 1768	Monument
50 3682	50 3682-7	1939	Krauss-Maffei; 15774	Dampflokfreunde Salzwedel (private)		BW Salzwedel			Ex 50 255	Yes
50 3685	50 3685-0	1940	Krauss-Maffei; 16037	Dampflokfreunde Salzwedel (private)		BW Salzwedel			Ex 50 828	No
50 3688	50 3688-4	1941	Škoda Works; 1175	Deutsche Bahn	Förderverein BW Arnstadt	EM BW Arnstadt			Ex-50 1096	Museum locomotive
50 3690	50 3690-0	1941	Henschel; 26275	German Steam Locomotive Museum (DDM)		DDM, Neuenmarkt			Ex 50 1465	No
50 3691	50 3691-0	1941	LOFAG; 9139	WAB		BW Altenbeken			Ex 50 3691	
50 3693	50 3693-4	1942	Jung; 9984	Bernd Falz (private)		BW Falkenberg			Ex DRG 50 1614	No
50 3695	50 3695-9	1941	BMAG; 11555	Traditionsbetriebswerk Staßfurt	Salzland-Express	TBW Staßfurt			Ex 50 1066, general inspection 06/07	No
50 3700	50 3700-7	1939	Krupp; 2083	Traditionsbetriebswerk Staßfurt	Salzland-Express	TBW Staßfurt			Ex 50 217	No
50 3703	50 3703-1	1941	Krauss-Maffei; 16087	Rügen Railway & Technology Museum (EM Rügen)		EM Rügen, Prora			Ex 50 877	Museum locomotive
50 3707	50 3707-2	1940	Henschel; 25843	Grün Berlin Park and Garten GmbH		Berlin Naturpark Süd			Ex 50 624	Monument
50 3708	50 3708-0	1941	BMAG; 11603	Traditionsgemeinschaft 50 3708 e.V.		Blankenburg			Ex 50 1309, frame of 50 265, last converted 50.35, general inspection 09/06	Yes

==== Class 50.40 ====
The 88 goods train locomotives of Class 50.40 of the Deutsche Reichsbahn (East Germany) were a new design in parallel with the DR Class 23.10 passenger train locomotives.

Running no.	EDP- No.	Built	Manufacturer Factory no.	Owner	Operator Route	Location	DBAG BR 088	Image	Remarks	Working
50 4073	50 4073-8	1960	Lokomotivbau Babelsberg; 124073	BEM	BayernBahn	AW, Meiningen			Currently being externally restored	No

==== Class 50.50 ====
Between 1966 and 1971, 72 Class 50.35 engines were given oil-firing by the Deutsche Reichsbahn in East Germany. To distinguish them they were grouped into a new class, Class 50.50. On the introduction of the EDP numbers in 1970 they were given running numbers 50 0001 - 50 0072.

Running no.	EDP- No.	Built	Manufacturer Factory no.	Owner	Operator Route	Location	DBAG BR 088	Image	Remarks	Working
50 0040	50 0040-1	1941	BMAG; 11553			BW Altenbeken			Oil burner ->50 5040, ex DRG/DR 50 1064, ex DR 50 3651, wrongly badged	
50 0072	50 0072-4	1940	Krauss-Maffei; 15832	Bavarian Railway Museum (BEM)		BEM Nördlingen			Oil burner, ex DRG/DR 50 481, ex DR 50 3502	No

=== Class 52 ===
The DRG Class 52 was the most numerous of the so-called Kriegslokomotiven, with more than 6,700 locos being produced.

Running no.	EDP- No.	Built	Manufacturer Factory no.	Owner	Operator Route	Location	DBAG BR 088	Image	Remarks	Working
52 360	52 1360-8	1943	Borsig; 15475	Railway Museum Society		Vienenburg station			Mixer-preheater	Yes
52 662	52 1662-7	1944	Schichau; 4215	Bernd Falz (private)		EM Hermeskeil			Plate frame	Museum locomotive
52 1423	52 1423-4	1943	ME; 4609	Bernd Falz (private)		EM Hermeskeil			Plate frame	
52 2093	52 2093-4	1943	Henschel; 26849	Bernd Falz (private)		EM Hermeskeil			Bar frame	
52 2195	52 2195-7	1943	Henschel; 27046	Bavarian Railway Museum (BEM)		BEM, Nördlingen				Museum locomotive
52 2751	52 2751-7	1944	Henschel; 27991			Marl theatre			Sculpture La Tortuga by Wolf Vostell	Sculpture
52 3548	52 3548-6	1943	Krauss-Maffei; 16685	Bavarian Railway Museum (BEM)		BEM, Nördlingen			Mixer-preheater	Museum locomotive
52 4544		1944	DWM; 861	HC		Kassel Technology Park, Wilhelmshöhe			HC 4, ex PKP Pmp Ty 4544	Yes
52 4867		1943	MBA; 13931	HEF	Frankfurt Harbour Rly, HLB (Königsteiner Bahn)	Frankfurt East Harbour			Bar frame, ex ÖBB 152.4687, ex GKB 152.4687, general inspection2003	Yes
52 4924	52 4924-8	1943	MBA; 13994	Saxon Railway Museum (SEM)		SEM Chemnitz-Hilbersdorf			Original design, rolling (non-working)	Museum locomotive
52 4966	52 4966-9	1944	MBA; 14036	Deutsches Technikmuseum Berlin (DTMB)		Berlin Anhalter Bf				Museum locomotive
52 5448	52 5448-7	1943	Schichau; 3726	EMBB		Leipzig HBF, Gleis 24				
52 5679	52 5679-7	1943	Schichau; 3957			BW Falkenberg				Monument
52 5804		1944	Schichau; 4101	German Steam Locomotive Museum (DDM)		DDM, Neuenmarkt			Factory-delivered livery, ex ÖBB 52.5804	Museum locomotive
52 6106		1943	BMAG; 12547	Vulkan-Eifel-Bahn		Bw Gerolstein			Loco included in Reko programme, but no longer has a mixer-preheater (since rebuilt into a heating engine in the 1980s) and therefore turned visually back to original design again. Meanwhile, engine has lost its Reko number, 52 8095.	Yes
52 6666	52 6666-3	1943	Škoda Works; 1492	Deutsche Bahn			BW Berlin-Schöneweide		Rigid-framed tender	No
52 6721	52 6721-6	1943	BMAG or LOFAG unclear	Bernd Falz (private)		EM Hermeskeil			Bar frame	
52 7409		1943	LOFAG; 16862		DGEG	Würzburg			Ex-ÖBB 52.7409	Yes
52 7596		1944	LOFAG; 16944	EFZ					Ex-ÖBB, rolling, currently in Meiningen for restoration, general inspection 01/04	No
52 7612		1944	LOFAG; 16960						post 1945, ex ÖBB 52.7612	Yes

==== Class 52.80 ====
The DR Class 52.80 was a series (52 8001 - 52 8200) of Rekoloks constructed from the Deutsche Reichsbahn’s fleet of Class 52s in East Germany. They were converted from the old stock in a similar manner to the Class 50.35 around 1960 and fitted with more powerful boilers.

Running no.	EDP- No.	Built	Manufacturer Factory no.	Owner	Operator Route	Location	DBAG BR 088	Image	Remarks	Working
52 8001	52 8001-1	1944	Schichau; 4124			BW Oebisfelde			Ex 52 671	No
52 8006	52 8006-0	1944	Henschel; 27822	Bernd Falz (private)		EM Hermeskeil			Ex 52 2644	Museum locomotive
52 8008	52 8008-6	1944	LOFAG; 16953	Bernd Falz (private)		BW Falkenberg			Ex 52 7605	No
52 8009	52 8009-4	1943	Grafenstaden; 7872	Bernd Falz (private)		BW Falkenberg			Ex 52 1605	No
52 8012	52 8012-8	1944	O&K; 14014	Wutachtalbahn e.V.		Blumberg			Ex 52 4944	Museum locomotive
52 8013	52 8013-6	1943	ME; 4827	Bernd Falz (private)		BW Falkenberg			Ex 52 3734	No
52 8015	52 8015-1	1943	Krauss-Maffei; 16590			Lehrte			Ex 52 3464	No
52 8017	52 8017-7	1944	MBA; 14170	Dampflokfreunde Berlin		Brandenburg-Kirchmöser			Ex 52 3916	Monument
52 8019	52 8019-3	1944	Grafenstaden; 7978	Private		DDMM Tuttlingen			Ex 52 1711	No
52 8020	52 8020-1	1943	Schichau; 4028	Private		DDMM Tuttlingen			Ex 52 627	No
52 8021	52 8021-9	1943	Škoda Works; 1510	Bernd Falz (private)		BW Falkenberg			Ex 52 6684	No
52 8023	52 8023-5	1944	Henschel; 27884	Bernd Falz (private)		BW Falkenberg			Ex 52 2706	No
52 8028	52 8028	1944	BMAG; 13130	Eisenbahnfreunde Hoher Fläming e.V.		Belzig			Ex 52 563	No
52 8029	52 8029-2	1944	MBA; 14103	Hei Na Ganzlin	Röbel-Ganzlin	Nossen			Ex 52 5018	Yes
52 8030	52 8030-0	1944	MBA; 14091	Bernd Falz (private)		BW Falkenberg			Ex 52 5012	No
52 8035	52 8035-9	1943	Schichau; 4052	Bernd Falz (private)		BW Falkenberg			Ex 52 5761	No
52 8036	52 8036-9	1943	Grafenstaden; 7884	Bernd Falz (private)		BW Falkenberg			Ex 52 1617	No
52 8037	52 8037-5	1944	Henschel; 27905	WAB		BW Falkenberg			Ex 52 712	No
52 8038	52 8038-3	1943	Krenau; 1289	DEW	Rinteln-Stadthagen railway	Rinteln roundhouse			Ex 52 5274	Yes
52 8039	52 8039-1	1943	Henschel; 27952	Private	Ostertalbahn	Schwarzerden			Ex 52 2720	No
52 8041	52 8041-7	1943	Krenau; 1252	Förderverein Berlin - Anhaltische Eisenbahn		BW Lu.- Wittenberg			Ex 52 5243	Museum locomotive
52 8042	52 8042-5	1943	LOFAG; 16575	Bernd Falz (private)		BW Falkenberg			Ex 52 7122	No
52 8043	52 8043-3	1942	Borsig; 15455	Private		DDMM Tuttlingen			Ex 52 358	No
52 8044	52 8044-1	1943	Krauss-Maffei; 16581	Bernd Falz (private)		BW Falkenberg			Ex 52 3455	No
52 8047	52 8047-4	1944	BMAG; 12812	IG steam engine Nossen e.V.		BW Nossen			Ex-52 6359	Yes
52 8051	52 8051-6	1943	LOFAG; 16232	Private		DDMM Tuttlingen			Ex 52 6779	No
52 8056	52 8056-5	1943	LOFAG; 16231			Bautzen station			Ex-52 6778	Monument
52 8057	52 8057-3	1943	LOFAG; 16701	Private		DDMM Tuttlingen			Ex 52 7248	No
52 8058	52 8058-1	1944	LOFAG; 17065			BW Falkenberg			Ex 52 7717	Museum locomotive
52 8062	52 8062-3	1943	Henschel; 27635			Treuenbrietzen			Ex 52 2467	Monument
52 8064	52 8064-9	1943	BMAG; 12452	Private		BW Krefeld			Ex 52 6011	No
52 8068	52 8068-0	1944	Jung; 11322	Saxon Railway Museum (SEM)		Saxon Railway Museum (SEM) Chemnitz-Hilbersdorf			Ex 52 3311	No
52 8069	52 8069-8	1943	Henschel; 27050	Private		BW Schwarzenberg			Ex 52 2199, ohne Tender and Stangen	No
52 8070	52 8070-6	1943	Jung; 11234	Private		Peitz			Ex 52 3223	No
52 8072	52 8072-2	1943	Henschel; 27556	Bernd Falz (private)		BW Falkenberg			Ex 52 2387	No
52 8075	52 8075-5	1944	DWM; 733	IGEW		BW Eisenach			Ex 52 1292	Yes
52 8077	52 8077-1	1943	ME; 4640	DBK HB		BW Crailsheim			Ex 52 1454	No
52 8079	52 8079-7	1943	Schichau; 3937	Christian Goldschagg (private)		BW Nossen			Ex 52 5659	Yes
52 8080	52 8080-5	1944	O&K; 14094	OSE		Lokschuppen Löbau			Ex 52 5015	Yes
52 8083	52 8083-9	1944	O&K; 14076	WAB		BW Altenbeken			Ex 52 3699	No
52 8085	52 8085-4	1944	DWM; 829	Bernd Falz (private)		BW Falkenberg			Ex 52 4512	No
52 8086	52 8086-2	1943	Henschel; 27463	Förderverein Wupperschiene e.V.		Dahlhausen			Ex 52 2295	Museum locomotive
52 8087	52 8087-0	1943	Henschel; 27623	Schwabendampf e.V.		Neuoffingen			Ex 52 2455	No
52 8089	52 8089-6	1944	Henschel; 27827	Bernd Falz (private)		BW Falkenberg			Ex 52 2649	No
52 8090	52 8090-4	1944	MBA; 14362	Bernd Falz (private)		EM Hermeskeil			Ex 52 7778	No
52 8092	52 8092-0	1943	Grafenstaden; 7871	Bernd Falz (private)		BW Falkenberg			Ex 52 1604	No
52 8095	52 8095-3	1943	BMAG; 12547	Vulkan-Eifel-Bahn		Bw Gerolstein			Ex 52 6106, designated as 52 6106	Yes
52 8097	52 8097-9	1943	Henschel; 27879			Frankfurt (Oder) Gbf			Ex 52 2701	No
52 8098	52 8098-7	1943	Krauss-Maffei; 16546	South German Railway Museum (SEH)		SEH Heilbronn			Ex 52 3420	No
52 8100	52 8100-1	1943	DWM Posen; 559	Bernd Falz (private)		BW Falkenberg			Ex 52 1145	No
52 8102	52 8102-7	1943	LOFAG; 16898	Bernd Falz (private)		BW Falkenberg			Ex 52 7550	No
52 8104	52 8104-3	1943	Schichau; 3862	Bernd Falz (private)		BW Falkenberg			Ex 52 5584	No
52 8106	52 8106-8	1943	BMAG; 12600	Eisenbahnfreunde Treysa e.V. (ex EF Schwalm-Knüll e.V.)	Eisenbahnfreunde Treysa e.V.	BW Treysa			Ex 52 6159	Yes
52 8109	52 8109-2	1944	Henschel; 28240	Thüringer Eisenbahnverein Weimar		BW Weimar			Ex 52 2883	Museum locomotive
52 8111	52 8111-8	1943	BMAG; 12433	Private		DDMM Tuttlingen			Ex 52 5992	No
52 8113	52 8113-4	1944	DWM; 573	Bernd Falz (private)		EM Hermeskeil			Ex 52 1159	No
52 8115	52 8115-9	1943	Krauss-Maffei; 16705	Knappenrode Mining Museum		Knappenrode			Ex 52 3568	Monument
52 8116	52 8116-7	1943	Krauss-Maffei; 16480	EFO		EM, Dieringhausen			Ex 52 3354	No
52 8117	52 8117-5	1943	LOFAG; 16674	Bernd Falz (private)		BW Falkenberg			Ex 52 7221	Museum locomotive
52 8118	52 8118-3	1943	Henschel; 27031	Private		Brandenburg Hafen			Ex 52 2180	No
52 8120	52 8120-9	1944	Henschel; 27830	Bernd Falz (private)		EM Hermeskeil			Ex 52 2652	No
52 8122	52 8122-5	1944	BMAG; 12943	Bernd Falz (private)		BW Falkenberg			Ex 52 6390	No
52 8123	52 8123-3	1943	Grafenstaden; 7900	Bernd Falz (private)		EM Hermeskeil			Ex 52 1633, '90 heating engine	No
52 8125	52 8125-8	1943	BMAG; 12743	Private		DDMM Tuttlingen			Ex 52 6300	No
52 8126	52 8126-6	1943	Borsig; 15459	Bernd Falz (private)		BW Falkenberg			Ex 52 362	No
52 8129	52 8129-0	1944	DWM; 777	Private		Brandenburg an der Havel harbour			Ex 52 1325	No
52 8130	52 8130-8	1943	DWM; 557	Private		DDMM Tuttlingen			Ex 52 1143	No
52 8131	52 8131-6	1943	Jung; 11229	Wedler & Franz GbR (WFL)		BW Nossen			Ex 52 3218, being restored	No
52 8132	52 8132-4	1944	MBA; 14373	Bernd Falz (private)		BW Falkenberg			Ex 52 7789	No
52 8133	52 8133-2	1943	ME; 4729	Bernd Falz (private)		BW Falkenberg			Ex 52 1505	No
52 8134	52 8134-0	1943	LOFAG; 16591	Eisenbahnfreunde Betzdorf		AW Siegen			Ex 52 7138	Yes
52 8135	52 8135-7	1943	Borsig; 15571			Wildau Technical College			Ex 52 474	Monument
52 8137	52 8137-3	1944	Schichau; 4100	Traditionsbetriebswerk Staßfurt		TBW Staßfurt Est			Ex 52 5803, ex steam generator	No
52 8138	52 8138-1	1943	LOFAG; 16766	Private		DDMM Tuttlingen			Ex 52 7313	No
52 8141	52 8141-5	1944	Krenau; 11 562	OSE		Löbau roundhouse			Ex 52 5315	No
52 8145	52 8145-6	1943	DWM; 583			Frankfurt (Oder) Gbf			Ex 52 1169	No
52 8147	52 8147-2	1944	Henschel; 27826	Ostertalbahn e.V.	Ottweiler–Schwarzerden	Schwarzerden			Ex 52 2648, dismantled	No
52 8148	52 8148-0	1943	BMAG; 13114	Dampfbahn-Rur-Wurm-Inde e.V.		BW Mönchengladbach			Ex 52 547	Yes
52 8149	52 8149-8	1944	Krenau; 1395	Saxon Railway Museum (SEM)		SEM, Chemnitz-Hilbersdorf			Ex 52 3839, with Giesl ejector	No
52 8152	52 8152-2	1943	BMAG; 12523	Private		Brandenburg Hafen			Ex 52 6082	No
52 8154	52 8154-8	1943	O&K; 13966	Private	EMBB	Leipzig-Plagwitz			Ex 52 4896	Yes
52 8156	52 8156-3	1943	Schichau; 3956	Fred Prinsen GmbH, Kloster Lehnin-Reckhahn		Belzig			Ex 52 5678	No
52 8157	52 8157-1	1943	LOFAG; 16282	Bernd Falz (private)		BW Falkenberg			Ex 52 6829	No
52 8161	52 8161-3	1943	Schichau; 3797	Traditionsbetriebswerk Staßfurt		TBW Staßfurt Est			Ex 52 5519	No
52 8168	52 8168-8	1943	Krauss-Maffei; 16711	Bavarian Railway Museum (BEM)		BEM, Nördlingen			Ex 52 3574	Museum locomotive
52 8169	52 8169-6	1944	DWM; 676	Private		DDMM Tuttlingen			Ex 52 1248	No
52 8170	52 8170-4	1944	Jung; 11265	Bernd Falz (private)		BW Falkenberg			Ex 52 3254	Museum locomotive
52 8171	52 8171-2	1944	ME; 4738	IG Hirzbergbahn	Lohmühlenmuseum	Georgenthal			Ex 52 1514	Monument
52 8173	52 8173-8	1944	Jung; 11222	Dampflokfreunde Berlin	Dampflokfreunde Berlin	BW Berlin-Schöneweide			Ex 52 3211	No
52 8174	52 8174-6	1943	Henschel; 27621	Private		BW Falkenberg			Ex 52 2453	No
52 8175	52 8175-3	1943	Jung; 11222	Bernd Falz (private)		BW Falkenberg			Ex 52 3211	No
52 8176	52 8176-1	1944	ME; 4838	Private		DDMM Tuttlingen			Ex 52 3871	No
52 8177	52 8177-9	1944	O&K; 14066	Dampflokfreunde Berlin	Dampflokfreunde Berlin	BW Berlin-Schöneweide			Ex 52 4996	Yes
52 8183	52 8183-7	1943	Henschel; 27834	VSE		BW Schwarzenberg			Ex 52 2656	No
52 8184	52 8184-5	1944	LOFAG; 17266	Traditionsbetriebswerk Staßfurt	Salzland-Express	TBW Staßfurt			Ex 52 3722	Yes
52 8187	52 8187-8	1944	Henschel; 27804	Bernd Falz (private)		BW Falkenberg			Ex 52 2626	No
52 8189	52 8189-4	1943	Krenau; 1327	Traditionsbetriebswerk Staßfurt	Salzland-Express	TBW, Staßfurt			Ex 52 5306	No
52 8190	52 8190-2	1944	Henschel; 28244	Rügen Railway & Technology Museum (Rügen) RTM		Rügen RTM, Prora			Ex 52 2887	Museum locomotive
52 8191	52 8191-0	1944	Henschel; 27853	Private		DDMM Tuttlingen			Ex 52 2675	No
52 8194	52 8194-4	1943	BMAG; 13123	Bernd Falz (private)		BW Falkenberg			Ex 52 556	No
52 8195	52 8195-1	1944	O&K; 13971	Franconian Museum Railway		Nuremberg Northeast			Ex 52 4901	Yes
52 8197	52 8197-7	1944	LOFAG; 16929	Bernd Falz (private)		EM Hermeskeil			Ex 52 7581	Museum locomotive
52 8198	52 8198-5	1943	DWM; 640	Private		DDMM Tuttlingen			Ex 52 1217	No
52 8199	52 8199-3	1944	Jung; 11263	Oelsnitz Mining Museum		Oelsnitz Mining Museum			Ex 52 3252	Monument

==== Class 52.90 ====
In the early 1950s, 25 DRB Class 52 locomotives were converted to Wendler brown coal firing at RAW Stendal. On the introduction of the computerised numbers they were grouped into sub-class 52.90.

Running no.	EDP- No.	Built	Manufacturer Factory no.	Owner	Operator Route	Location	DBAG BR 088	Image	Remarks	Working
52 4900	52 9900-0	1943	MBA; 13969	Deutsche Bahn		Nuremberg Transport Museum, Halle branch			Currently Being Restored	Museum locomotive

=== Class 55 ===
The Deutsche Reichsbahn grouped all ex-state railway, eight-coupled, goods train, tender locomotives with no carrying wheels into their Class 55.

==== Class 55.0-6 ====
The Prussian Class G 7.1 engines were built from 1893 by the firm of Stettiner Maschinenbau AG Vulcan. They were equipped with the same boiler as that of the Prussian G 5.

Running no.	EDP- No.	Built	Manufacturer Factory no.	Owner	Operator Route	Location	DBAG BR 088	Image	Remarks	Working
55 669		1905	Henschel; 7419	Dresden Transport Museum		Dresden outside depot (not accessible)			Ex Prussian G 7.1, Saarbrücken 2037, SAAR 4426	Museum locomotive

==== Class 55.16-22 ====
Class 55.16-22 comprised the Prussian G 8 locomotives built between 1902 and 1913 by various manufacturers. They were the first superheated, goods train locomotives in Prussia.

Running no.	EDP- No.	Built	Manufacturer Factory no.	Owner	Operator Route	Location	DBAG BR 088	Image	Remarks	Working
55 2204		1913	Hanomag; 6721	Darmstadt-Kranichstein Railway Museum (EMD-K)	Deutsche Museumseisenbahn	EMD-K Darmstadt-Kranichstein			Badged as 4981 Mainz, ex KED Münster 4981, ex-TCDD 44.079 until 1987	Yes

==== Class 55.25-58 ====
The Class 55.25-58 were the former Prussian G 8.1 locomotives built between 1913 and 1921, a stronger and heavier evolutionary development of the Prussian G 8, that was initially classed as a "strengthened standard class".

Running no.	EDP- No.	Built	Manufacturer Factory no.	Owner	Operator Route	Location	DBAG BR 088	Image	Remarks	Working
55 3345	055 345-3	1915	Henschel; 13354	DGEG		Bochum-Dahlhausen Railway Museum			KED Cassel 5159	Museum locomotive

=== Class 56 ===
The Deutsche Reichsbahn incorporated the state railway, goods train, tender locomotives with one leading axle and four coupled axles into Class 56.

==== Class 56.30 ====
The Prussian G 8.2 is a variant of the Prussian G 8.3 with two cylinders. The Reichsbahn gave running numbers 56 3001 - 56 3008 to those of the Lübeck-Büchen Railway, which were also used on passenger train duties.

Running no.	EDP- No.	Built	Manufacturer Factory no.	Owner	Operator Route	Location	DBAG BR 088	Image	Remarks	Working
56 3007		1929	Linke; 3128	Darmstadt-Kranichstein Railway Museum (EMD-K)	German Museum Railway	EMD-K, Darmstadt-Kranichstein			Ex-LBE No. 97; ex Eschweiler Mining Union "No. 4"	No

=== Class 57 ===
The DRG Class 57 encompassed various ex-state railway, goods train, tender locomotives with E axle arrangements.

==== Class 57.10-35 ====
The Reichsbahn allocated running numbers 57 1001 - 57 3524 to the Prussian T 16 and also the G 10 which had evolved from the Prussian P 8.

Running no.	EDP- No.	Built	Manufacturer Factory no.	Owner	Operator Route	Location	DBAG BR 088	Remarks	Working
57 3088	057 088-7	1922	Rheinmetall; 550	Nuremberg Transport Museum, Nuremberg	EFB	AW Siegen		KED Halle 6011, G10	Museum locomotive
57 3297	57 3297-8	1923	Hohenzollern; 4401	Dresden Transport Museum, Dresden		Saxon Railway Museum (SEM), Chemnitz-Hilbersdorf		Ex-DRG 33 2327, ex DR heritage loco, long-term loan	Museum locomotive
57 3525		1926	Rheinmetall; 913	Bavarian Railway Museum (BEM)		BEM, Nördlingen		Ex-CFR 50.227, 57 3525 was chosen as it was the highest known DRG-numbered engine	Museum locomotive
57 3597		1930	Henschel; 21660	South German Railway Museum(SEH)		SEH Heilbronn		Ex-CFR 50.397, no DR number	No

=== Class 58 ===
The DRG's Class 58 includes various ex-state railway, goods train, tender locomotives with an axle arrangement of 1'E (Decapod). Because they were used by almost all the Länderbahn railway administrations (except Bavaria), they are often described as the first German Einheitslokomotiven, despite oft-repeated comments to the contrary.

==== Class 58.2-3 ====
The Baden G 12 of the Royal Württemberg State Railways was based on the Prussian G 12.1 and a goods train locomotive class with a 1'E axle arrangement built by Henschel for the Royal Ottoman General Division of Military Railways (Kaiserlich Ottomanische Generaldirektion of the Militäreisenbahnen or C.F.O.A.).

Running no.	EDP- No.	Built	Manufacturer Factory no.	Owner	Operator Route	Location	DBAG BR 088	Image	Remarks	Working
58 261	58 1261-5	1921	BBC; 5001	Dresden Transport Museum		Saxon Railway Museum (SEM), Chemnitz-Hilbersdorf			Ex-Baden State Railways "1047", the only preserved example of 12 BBC-produced locos	Rolling
58 311	58 1111-2	1921	MBG K 2153	UEF	Albtalbahn	Albtal			Baden State Railways "1125"	Yes

==== Class 58.10-21 ====
The Prussian G 12 was built for the Prussian state railways and was based on the Prussian G 12.1 and a goods train, locomotive with a 1'E axle arrangement built by Henschel for the Royal Ottoman General Division of Military Railways (Kaiserlich Ottomanische Generaldirektion of the Militäreisenbahnen or C.F.O.A.).

Running no.	EDP- No.	Built	Manufacturer Factory no.	Owner	Operator Route	Location	DBAG BR 088	Image	Remarks	Working
58 1616		1918	Borsig	Bernd Falz (private)		EM Hermeskeil			Former Dsp 107, KED Breslau 5582	

==== Class 58.30 ====
Between 1956 and 1963, the Deutsche Reichsbahn (East Germany) had 56 Class 58 locomotives fitted with a new-design boiler. These Rekoloks were reclassified as DR Class 58.30.

Running no.	EDP- No.	Built	Manufacturer Factory no.	Owner	Operator Route	Location	DBAG BR 088	Image	Remarks	Working
58 3047	58 3047-6	1920	Linke; 2027	Nuremberg Transport Museum, Nuremberg	IG 58 3047	BW Glauchau			KED Erfurt 5672, Rebuilt from 58 1955, DR heritage locomotive	No
58 3049	58 3049-2	1920	Hanomag; 9272	VSE		BW Schwarzenberg			Rebuilt from 58 1725, KED Köln 5617	No

=== Class 62 ===
The 15 two-cylinder, superheated locomotives of DRG Class 62 were developed by the firm of Henschel as standard, passenger train, tank locomotives for the Deutsche Reichsbahn in the 1920s.

Running no.	EDP- No.	Built	Manufacturer Factory no.	Owner	Operator Route	Location	DBAG BR 088	Image	Remarks	Working
62 015	62 1015-7	1932	Henschel; 20858	Deutsche Bahn		BW Dresden-Altstadt			Last example of its class	Museum locomotive

=== Class 64 ===
The DRG Class 64 was a standard, passenger train tank locomotive with a load axle load and a 1'C1' axle arrangement, affectionately known as the Bubikopf (German for the 1920s style 'bob' haircut).

Running no.	EDP- No.	Built	Manufacturer Factory no.	Owner	Operator Route	Location	DBAG BR 088	Image	Remarks	Working
64 007	64 1007-0	1928	Borsig; 11963	Deutsche Bahn	Mecklenburgische Eisenbahnfreunde Schwerin e.V.	BW Schwerin	088 645-7		Rivetted water tanks	No
64 094	064 094-6	1928	Humboldt; 1821	GES		Kornwestheim Railway Museum			Formerly a monument at Tamm	No
64 289		1934	Krupp; 1298	EfZ	South German Railway Museum (SEH)	SEH, Heilbronn			Ex-Eisenbahn-Kurier, on loan	No
64 295		1934	ME; 4249	German Steam Locomotive Museum (DDM)		DDM, Neuenmarkt				No
64 317	64 1317-3	1934	Krupp; 1320	?		Frankfurt (Oder) station				Monument
64 419	064 419-5	1935	ME; 4312	DBK Historic Railway (DBK HB)		BW Crailsheim				Yes
64 446	064 446-8	1938	Krauss-Maffei; 15625	Deutsche Bahn		BW Neumünster				No
64 491	064 491-4	1940	O&K; 13298	Dampfbahn Fränkische Schweiz (DFS)		Bf Ebermannstadt			New-design boiler	Yes
64 520	064 520-0	1940	Jung; 9270	Bavarian Railway Museum (BEM)		BEM, Nördlingen			Formerly a monument at Engen	No

=== Class 65 ===
The Class 65s were passenger train, tank locomotives with the Deutsche Bundesbahn and Deutsche Reichsbahn (East Germany).

==== Class 65.10 ====
Like the DB Class 65, the DR Class 65.10 were intended for commuter traffic on suburban railway lines. The Deutsche Reichsbahn bought a total of 88 engines of this class.

Running no.	EDP- No.	Built	Manufacturer Factory no.	Owner	Operator Route	Location	DBAG BR 088	Image	Remarks	Working
65 1008	65 1008-5	1956	LKM; 121008	Pomerania e.V.		Pasewalk				No
65 1049	65 1049-9	1956	LKM; 121049	Deutsche Bahn	LEG	Saxon Railway Museum (SEM)			Ex-DR heritage locomotive	Yes
65 1057	65 1057-2	1957	LKM; 121057	Berliner Eisenbahnfreunde		EM Basdorf				No

=== Class 66 ===
The DB Class 66 was planned by the Deutsche Bundesbahn for fast freight and passenger train services on main and branch lines. These Neubaulokomotiven were intended to replace Länderbahn passenger train tank locomotives like the Class 38.10, 78 and 93 and were the penultimate locomotive series built as part of the DB's Neubau programme of newly designed engines.

Running no.	EDP- No.	Built	Manufacturer Factory no.	Owner	Operator Route	Location	DBAG BR 088	Remarks	Working
66 002	066 002-7	1955	Henschel; 28924	DGEG		Bochum-Dahlhausen Railway Museum		Refurbishment to operational status planned, last example of its class	No

=== Class 70 ===
The DRG's Class 70 incorporated all passenger train, tank locomotives with a 1B axle arrangement:

==== Class 70.0 ====
These two-cylinder, superheated Bavarian Pt 2/3 engines were manufactured by Krauss for the Royal Bavarian State Railways between 1909 and 1915 and allocated to DRG Class 70.0.

Running no.	EDP- No.	Built	Manufacturer Factory no.	Owner	Operator Route	Location	DBAG BR 088	Image	Remarks	Working
70 083		1913	Krauss; 6733	Deutsche Bahn	Bavarian Localbahn Society (BLV)	Bahnbetriebswerk Landshut			K.Bay.Sts.B. No. 6083, Former monument at Mühldorf station	Yes

=== Class 74 ===
The DRG's Class 74 incorporated the Prussian T 11, Prussian T 12 and T 10 passenger train tank locomotives of the LBE with a 1'C axle arrangement.

==== Class 74.0-3 ====
The Class T 11 was a passenger train, tank locomotive built for the Prussian state railways

Running no.	EDP- No.	Built	Manufacturer Factory no.	Owner	Operator Route	Location	DBAG BR 088	Remarks	Working
74 231		1908	Union	Museums-Eisenbahn Minden (MEM)	Mindener Kreisbahnen	MEM, Minden		Ex-KED Hannover 7512	Yes

==== Class 74.4-13 ====
The Class T 12 was a passenger train tank locomotive produced for the Prussian state railways in large numbers. In 1925 the Reichsbahn took over 899 examples of this superheated derivative of the T 11 as Class 74.4-13 numbering them as 74 401 - 74 1300 with the exception of 74 544.

Running no.	EDP- No.	Built	Manufacturer Factory no.	Owner	Operator Route	Location	DBAG BR 088	Remarks	Working
74 1192		1915	Hohenzollern; 3376	DGEG		Bochum-Dahlhausen Railway Museum		Ex-KED Berlin 8470	No
74 1230		1916	Borsig; 9525	Deutsche Bahn		BW Berlin-Schöneweide	088 745-5	Ex-KED Berlin 8703	Museum locomotive

=== Class 75 ===
The DRG Class 75 swept up ex-state railway, passenger train, tank locomotives with an axle arrangement of 1'C1'. They were divided into sub-classes: 75.0 for the Württemberg T 5, 75.1-3 for the Baden VI b, 75.4,10-11 for the Baden VI c, 75.5 for the Saxon XIV HT and 75.6 for BLE Nos. 45 - 49, ELE Nos. 11 - 14 and other private railway locomotives taken over by the Reichsbahn.

==== Class 75.5 ====
In 1925 the Deutsche Reichsbahn arranged the six-coupled Saxon XIV HT tank locomotives from the Royal Saxon State Railways into Class 75.5.

Running no.	EDP- No.	Built	Manufacturer Factory no.	Owner	Operator Route	Location	DBAG BR 088	Image	Remarks	Working
75 501		1915	Sächsische Maschinenfabrik; 3836	German Steam Locomotive Museum (DDM)		BW Schwarzenberg			Ex-Saxon XIV HT	No
75 515		1911	Sächsische Maschinenfabrik; 3477	Dresden Transport Museum, Dresden		Saxon Railway Museum (SEM) Chemnitz-Hilbersdorf			Ex-Saxon XIV HT, DR heritage locomotive	Museum locomotive

==== Class 75.6 ====
In Class 75.6 were BLE Nos. 45 - 49, ELE Nos. 11 - 14 and other private railway locomotives taken over by the Reichsbahn.

Running no.	EDP- No.	Built	Manufacturer Factory no.	Owner	Operator Route	Location	DBAG BR 088	Image	Remarks	Working
75 634		1928	Henschel; 21341	VVM		Aumühle			Ex ELE 14; ex TWE 223; ex FVE 223	Museum locomotive

==== Class 75.10-11 ====
The Baden VI c was an evolutionary development of the Baden VI b and was delivered by the Maschinenbau-Gesellschaft Karlsruhe from 1914 onwards to the Grand Duchy of Baden State Railway. The Class 75.10-11 includes the heavier, frame-strengthened engines from the last two series.

Running no.	EDP- No.	Built	Manufacturer Factory no.	Owner	Operator Route	Location	DBAG BR 088	Image	Remarks	Working
75 1118		1921	MBG K 2150	UEF	Lokalbahn Amstetten–Gerstetten	Amstetten			Ex-Baden VI c, Baden State Railway 1122	Yes

=== Class 78 ===
Class 78 are DB and DR tank locomotives with an axle arrangement of 2'C2'.

==== Class 78.0-5 ====
Class 78.0-5 incorporates the former Prussian and Württemberg T 18 locomotives.

Running no.	EDP- No.	Built	Manufacturer Factory no.	Owner	Operator Route	Location	DBAG BR 088	Image	Remarks	Working
78 009	78 1009-6	1912	Vulcan; 2761	Dresden Transport Museum		Dresden outside depot (inaccessible)			KED Stettin 8409, ex DR heritage locomotive	Museum locomotive
78 192	078 192-2	1920	Vulcan; 3613			DDMM Tuttlingen			KED Frankfurt 8428	No
78 246	078 246-6	1922	Vulcan; 3772	DDM		DDM Neuenmarkt			KED Essen 8473, push-pull equipment	No
78 468	078 468-6	1923	Henschel; 20166	Stadt Oberhausen	EPEG	Lengerich			Push-pull equipment	Yes
78 510	078 510-5	1924	Vulcan; 3973	Deutsche Bahn		Nuremberg Transport Museum, Nuremberg			Push-pull equipment, monument at AW Witten	No

=== Class 80 ===
The 39 tank engines of DRG Class 80 emerged between 1927 and 1928 as standard, shunting locomotives for the Deutsche Reichsbahn. They were built in the locomotive works of Jung in Jungenthal, Union in Königsberg, Wolf and Hohenzollern.

Running no.	EDP- No.	Built	Manufacturer Factory no.	Owner	Operator Route	Location	DBAG BR 088	Image	Remarks	Working
80 009		1927	Union; 2799	Private		Berlin-Bohnsdorf			Ex-RAW Halle, locomotive no. 2	Museum locomotive
80 013		1927	Hagans; 1227	German Steam Locomotive Museum (DDM)		DDM, Neuenmarkt				No
80 014		1927	Hagans; 1227	South German Railway Museum (SEH)		SEH Heilbronn			Ex-DRG 80 014, ex Klöckner 5, ex Ruhrkohle RAG D 271, ex RAG 5, ex Steamtown (London), ex Nene-Valley Railway (UK), ex BEM	Museum locomotive
80 023		1928	Jung; 3862	Dresden Transport Museum		BW Dresden-Altstadt				Museum locomotive
80 030		1929	Hohenzollern; 4629	DGEG		Bochum-Dahlhausen Railway Museum			Photo livery, ex locomotive nos. 4 and 9 Klöckner, ex DAG D 724	Museum locomotive
80 039		1929	Hohenzollern; 4650	MEH		BW Hamm-Süd				Yes

=== Class 81 ===
These Hanomag-built locomotives of Class 81 were standard goods train tank engines with the Deutsche Reichsbahn with a Dh2t axle formula.

Running no.	EDP- No.	Built	Manufacturer Factory no.	Owner	Operator Route	Location	DBAG BR 088	Remarks	Working
81 004		1928	Hanomag; 10558	HC	Kassel-Naumburg railway	Kassel Technology Park, Marbachhöhe		Only preserved example, formerly a monument at Marienhafe	No

=== Class 82 ===
The DB Class 82 was a so-called Neubaudampflokomotive built by the Deutsche Bundesbahn for shunting and freight services. It was a tank engine with the axle formula E, built in 1950 and 1951 by the firms of Krupp and Henschel, and in 1955 by the Maschinenfabrik Esslingen.

Running no.	EDP- No.	Built	Manufacturer Factory no.	Owner	Operator Route	Location	DBAG BR 088	Remarks	Working
82 008		1950	Krupp; 2884	Deutsche Bahn	REF	BW Neumünster		Only preserved example, formerly a monument at Lingen	No

=== Class 85 ===
The DRG Class 85 was a goods train tank engine and Einheitslokomotive built for the Deutsche Reichsbahn.

Running no.	EDP- No.	Built	Manufacturer Factory no.	Owner	Operator Route	Location	DBAG BR 088	Image	Remarks	Working
85 007		1932	Henschel; 22116			BW Freiburg im Breisgau				stored

=== Class 86 ===
The DRG Class 86 was a standard, goods train, tank locomotive with the Deutsche Reichsbahn with a 1'D1' axle arrangement. It was built by almost every firm that supplied the Reichsbahn.

Running no.	EDP- No.	Built	Manufacturer Factory no.	Owner	Operator Route	Location	DBAG BR 088	Image	Remarks	Working
86 001	86 1001-4	1928	MBG K 2356	Nuremberg Transport Museum, Nuremberg		Saxon Railway Museum (SEM), Chemnitz-Hilbersdorf	088 865		DR heritage locomotive	Museum locomotive
86 049	86 1049-5	1932	Borsig; 14421	VSE		BW Schwarzenberg				Museum locomotive
86 283		1937	O&K; 12941	German Steam Locomotive Museum (DDM)		DDM, Neuenmarkt				Museum locomotive
86 333	86 1333-3	1939	LOFAG; 3211	Wutach Valley Railway		Fützen			Ex-DR, visually converted into a DB locomotive	Yes
86 346		1928	MBG K	UEF		Busenbach, Albtal				No
86 348		1939	LOFAG; 3251	GES		BW Kornwestheim			Being restored, former monument	No
86 457	086 457-9	1942	DWM; 442	Deutsche Bahn		South German Railway Museum (SEH), Heilbronn			Damaged in the major fire on 17 October 2005, loaned for 10 years to SEH for restoration	No
86 607	86 1607-0	1942	Borsig; 15280	Dresden Transport Museum	Vogtländischen Eisenbahnverein Adorf	BW Adorf			Uses as an industrial locomotive for a time	Museum locomotive
86 744		1942	O&K; 13795	MEM	Kleinenbremen - Minden - Hille Holzh.-Heddinghausen - Pr. Oldendorf - Bohmte	MEM Preußisch Oldendorf			Currently being restored, former Erfurt Industrial Railways locomotive, ex DR, visually DB	No

=== Class 89 ===
The DRG Class 89 was for tank locomotives with a C axle arrangement.

==== Class 89.0 ====
The Class 89.0 was the smallest Einheitslokomotive in the Deutsche Reichsbahn.

Running no.	EDP- No.	Built	Manufacturer Factory no.	Owner	Operator Route	Location	DBAG BR 088	Image	Remarks	Working
89 008		1937	Henschel; 23583	Mecklenburgische Eisenbahnfreunde Schwerin e.V.	Mecklenburgische Eisenbahnfreunde Schwerin e.V.	BW Schwerin			Superheated variant	No

==== Class 89.3-4 ====
The Württemberg T 3 of the Royal Württemberg State Railways were goods train tank engines with three coupled axles and no carrying axles.

Running no.	EDP- No.	Built	Manufacturer Factory no.	Owner	Operator Route	Location	DBAG BR 088	Image	Remarks	Working
89 312		1896	ME; 2792	State Museum for Work & Technology (SMWT)		SMWT, Mannheim			Württemberg T 3, no. 979, converted to fireless locomotive	No
89 339		1901	ME; 3154	EMD-K	Deutsche Museumseisenbahn	EMD-K, Darmstadt-Kranichstein			Württemberg T 3, no. 947	No
89 407		1912	MGH; 595	South German Railway Museum (SEH)		SEH Heilbronn			Ex-KWStE 888, ex Eurovapor, formerly a monument at Stuttgart	Museum locomotive, dismantled

==== Class 89.8 ====
The R 3/3 of the Royal Bavarian State Railways were goods train tank engines with three coupled axles and no carrying axles.

Running no.	EDP- No.	Built	Manufacturer Factory no.	Owner	Operator Route	Location	DBAG BR 088	Image	Remarks	Working
89 801		1921	Krauss-Maffei; 7851	Deutsche Bahn		Deutsches Museum, Koblenz			Bavarian R 3/3, ex-K.Bay.Sts.B. "4701", damaged in the major fire on 17 October 2005	No
89 837		1921	Krauss-Maffei; 7917	Bavarian Railway Museum (BEM)		BEM, Nördlingen			Bavarian R 3/3, ex-K.Bay.Sts.B. "4737"	No

==== Class 89.9 ====
The Deutsche Reichsbahn arranged former private railway vehicles into Class 89.9.

Running no.	EDP- No.	Built	Manufacturer Factory no.	Owner	Operator Route	Location	DBAG BR 088	Remarks	Working
89 906		1929	Linke; 3129	ME H	Odenwald	BW Hanau		Ex-Hydrierwerke Rodleben	Yes

==== Class 89.10 ====
DRG Class 89.10 were former Prussian T 8. steam locomotives.

Running no.	EDP- No.	Built	Manufacturer Factory no.	Owner	Operator Route	Location	DBAG BR 088	Image	Remarks	Working
89 1004		1906	Linke; 359	Nuremberg Transport Museum		DB Museum Halle	088 896-6			No

==== Class 89.59-66 ====
DRG Class 89.59-66 grouped together the former private railways engines.

Running no.	EDP- No.	Built	Manufacturer Factory no.	Owner	Operator Route	Location	DBAG BR 088	Remarks	Working
89 6009	89 6009-6	1902	Humboldt; 135	Deutsche Bahn	Dresden Transport Museum	BW Dresden-Altstadt		Prussian T3, ex 89 7403, KED Berlin 1808 and 6164	Yes
89 6024		1914	Henschel; 13025	DDM		DDM Neuenmarkt		Bismarck version, similar to Prussian T 3	Yes
89 6237		1924	Linke-Hofmann; 2936	Minden Museum Railway (MEM)	Wittlager Kreisbahn	MEM Preußisch-Oldendorf			Yes
89 6311	89 6311-8	1936	Henschel; 23061	Deutsche Bahn	Förderverein BW Arnstadt	EM BW Arnstadt			Museum locomotive

==== Class 89.70-75 ====
The Prussian T 3 locomotives of the Prussian state railways were six-coupled, tank locomotives with no carrying wheels. The Deutsche Reichsbahn took over 511 of them in 1925 as DRG Class 89.70-75.

Running no.	EDP- No.	Built	Manufacturer Factory no.	Owner	Operator Route	Location	DBAG BR 088	Remarks	Working
89 7159		1910	Henschel; 10037	DGEG	Cuckoo Railway (Kuckucksbähnel)	Neustadt/Weinstraße Railway Museum, Neustadt/Weinstraße		Schwerter Profileisenwalzwerk AG, from 1968 Gerhard Moll, Hilchenbach, works number of the boiler	Yes
89 7462		1903	Hagans; 1227	Nuremberg Transport Museum		DB Museum, Koblenz		From 1960 to 2000 play park locomotive at Cologne Zoo, ex KED Hannover 1854 and 6193, drawing (‘‘Musterblatt’’) M III 4 p	Museum locomotive
89 7531		1898	ME; 2985	South German Railway Museum (SEH)		SEH, Heilbronn		Ex-BLE 13 Rhueden, according to the DB renumbering scheme planned to be 89 6003 and 089 003-8	Museum locomotive

=== Class 90 ===
The Deutsche Reichsbahn grouped several variants of the T 9 steam locomotives from the Prussian state railways as Class 90.

==== Class 90.1 ====
The Prussian state railways' T 9.1 engines were goods train tank locomotives with an axle arrangement of C1'.

Running no.	EDP- No.	Built	Manufacturer Factory no.	Owner	Operator Route	Location	DBAG BR 088	Image	Remarks	Working
Cöln 1833		1893	Borsig; 4431	DGEG		Bochum-Dahlhausen Railway Museum			Ex-Cöln 7270, planned as 90 009 in the DRG renumbering plan. In 1925 to Pfeifer & Langen, Cologne, currently dismantled	No
Cöln 7294		1895	Hohenzollern; 850	South German Railway Museum (SEH)		SEH, Heilbronn			Ex 1857 Cöln, ex Carl-Alexander-Zeche Baesweiler 2, planned as 90 042 in the DRG renumbering scheme	No

=== Class 91 ===
Several steam locomotives of the Prussian state railways' T 9 class were incorporated into DRG Class 91.

Running no.	EDP- No.	Built	Manufacturer Factory no.	Owner	Operator Route	Location	DBAG BR 088	Image	Remarks	Working
91 134		1898	Grafenstaden; 4843	Mecklenburgische Eisenbahnfreunde Schwerin e.V.	Mecklenburgische Eisenbahnfreunde Schwerin e.V.	BW Schwerin			T 9.2, ex KED Trier 7128, ex BLE 41, ex DRG 91 048	Yes
91 319		1902	Henschel; 6128	Pängelanton Carnival Society		Münster Gremmendorf station			T 9.3, ex KED Erfurt 1815, ex Erfurt 7260, Georgsmarienhütte "5"	No
91 896^{II}		1912	Jung; 1937	Dresdner Verkehrsbetriebe?		Bw Dresden-Friedrichstadt			Ex-KED Frankfurt 7394	Monument
91 936		1903	Hohenzollern; 1592	Deutsches Technikmuseum Berlin (DTMB)		DTMB, Berlin			Ex-KED Frankfurt 7265	No
91 1708		1913	Union; 2061	Minden Museum Railway (MEM)		MEM, currently MaLoWa			Ex-KED Danzig 7224	No
91 6580		1938	Henschel; 23 887	Deutsche Bahn	Förderverein BW Arnstadt	Arnstadt	088 916-2		Private railway locomotive ex South German Railway Company (SEG) 400, ex EIB No.4	Museum locomotive

=== Class 92 ===
DRG Class 92 includes various passenger train tank locomotives with the axle formula D.

==== Class 92.5-10 ====
The Prussian T 13 was built by several manufacturers for the Prussian state railways, Imperial Railways in Alsace-Lorraine and Grand Duchy of Oldenburg State Railways. They were mainly employed on shunting duties.

Running no.	EDP- No.	Built	Manufacturer Factory no.	Owner	Operator Route	Location	DBAG BR 088	Image	Remarks	Working
92 503		1909	Union; 1803	Dresden Transport Museum		Dresden external depot (not accessible)			Ex-KED Essen 7901, ex DR heritage locomotive	Museum locomotive
92 638		1912	Union; 1974	MEM		Minden			Ex-KED Stettin 7906	Yes
92 739		1914	Union; 2126	DGEG		Neustadt/Weinstraße Railway Museum, Neustadt/Weinstraße			Ex-KED Essen 7964	No

=== Class 93 ===
DRG Class 93 incorporated tank locomotives with an axle arrangement of 1'D1'.

==== Class 93.0-4 ====
The Prussian state railways' T 14 were goods train tank engines.

Running no.	EDP- No.	Built	Manufacturer Factory no.	Owner	Operator Route	Location	DBAG BR 088	Image	Remarks	Working
93 230		1917	Union; 2315	Dresden Transport Museum		Dresden Transport Museum, Dresden			KED Erfurt 8526, DR heritage locomotive	No

==== Class 93.5-12 ====
The Prussian T 14.1s were goods train tank engines with a 1'D1' axle arrangement, which had a higher axle load on the rear carrying axle compared with the T14.

Running no.	EDP- No.	Built	Manufacturer Factory no.	Owner	Operator Route	Location	DBAG BR 088	Image	Remarks	Working
93 526		1919	Hohenzollern; 3949	German Steam Locomotive Museum (DDM)		Neuenmarkt			Ex Prussian T14.1	No

=== Class 94 ===
Tank locomotives with an E axle arrangement were grouped by the Deutsche Reichsbahn into Class 94.

==== Class 94.2-4 ====
DRG Class 94.2-4 comprised the T16 of the Prussian state railways, a goods train tank engine with an axle arrangement of E.

Running no.	EDP- No.	Built	Manufacturer Factory no.	Owner	Operator Route	Location	DBAG BR 088	Image	Remarks	Working
94 249		1908	Schwartzkopff; 4106	Heiligenstädter Eisenbahnverein		Heiligenstadt			Boiler 94 248, monument list in Thuringia	No

==== Class 94.5-17 ====
The T16.1 engines of the Prussian state railways were goods train tank engines. They were incorporated by the Deutsche Reichsbahn into DRG Class 94.5-17 .

Running no.	EDP- No.	Built	Manufacturer Factory no.	Owner	Operator Route	Location	DBAG BR 088	Image	Remarks	Working
94 1292	94 1292-5	1922	Henschel; 18885	Deutsche Bahn	DB AG	Erfurt			Stored with a damaged frame	Museum locomotive
94 1538		1922	Schwartzkopff; 8085	EPEG	Rennsteigbahn	Ilmenau			Ex-Gönnern monument, ex 8763 Essen	Yes
94 1692	094 692-1	1923	Schwartzkopff; 8396	Deutsche Bahn	REF	BW Neumünster				No
94 1697	094 697-0	1923	Schwartzkopff; 8401	Bavarian Railway Museum (BEM)		BEM, Nördlingen				No
94 1730		1924	Linke; 2899	German Steam Locomotive Museum (DDM)		DDM, Neuenmarkt				

==== Class 94.19-21 ====
The Saxon XI HT of the Royal Saxon State Railways were goods train tank engines. They were allocated by the Deutsche Reichsbahn to DRG Class 94.19-21.

Running no.	EDP- No.	Built	Manufacturer Factory no.	Owner	Operator Route	Location	DBAG BR 088	Image	Remarks	Working
94 2105	94 2105-8	1923	Hartmann; 4561	Private (Dresden)		BW Schwarzenberg				Museum locomotive

=== Class 95 ===
Class 95 incorporates tank locomotives of the Deutsche Reichsbahn and its successor administrations that have an axle arrangement of 1'E 1'.

==== Class 95.0 ====
The Class 95.0 was a ten-coupled tank locomotive with an axle arrangement of 1'E1'. It was procured by the Deutsche Reichsbahn in 1922 for heavy goods train duties on steep main line routes. Because the development of this class was begun by the Prussian state railways, it was designated as the "T 20".

Running no.	EDP- No.	Built	Manufacturer Factory no.	Owner	Operator Route	Location	DBAG BR 088	Image	Remarks	Working
95 009	95 0009-1	1922	Borsig; 11113	EFO		Dieringhausen Railway Museum, Dieringhausen			Ölhauptfeuerung	Museum locomotive
95 016	95 1016-6	1923	Borsig; 11653	German Steam Locomotive Museum (DDM)		DDM, Neuenmarkt				No
95 020		1923	Hanomag; 10178	Technikmuseum Speyer (TMS)		TMS, Speyer			Displayed as "95 007"	No
95 027	95 1027-1	1923	Hanomag; 10185	Rübeland Railway		Rübeland Railway, Blankenburg	088 955-0		Boiler 11113/1922, from 95 009	Yes
95 028	95 0028-1	1923	Hanomag; 10186	DGEG		Bochum-Dahlhausen Railway Museum			Primary oil-firing	No

==== Class 95.66 ====
The Class 95.66 was a ten-coupled tank locomotive with an axle arrangement of 1'E1', which the Halberstadt-Blankenburger Eisenbahn procured in 1920 for duties on steep routes as a replacement for rack railway locomotives. The series, comprising 4 locomotives, was the technical precursor of the Prussian T 20, later DRG Class 95.0.

Running no.	EDP- No.	Built	Manufacturer Factory no.	Owner	Operator Route	Location	DBAG BR 088	Image	Remarks	Working
95 6676		1920	Borsig; 10353	Dresden Transport Museum		Rübeland			HBE Tierklasse Mammut	Museum locomotive

=== Class 97 ===
Rack railway steam locomotives were incorporated by the Deutsche Reichsbahn into Class 97.

==== Class 97.5 ====
The Württemberg Hz were rack railway locomotives, that were developed by the Royal Württemberg State Railways, but not delivered until it had been merged into the Deutsche Reichsbahn, who reclassified them as Class 97.5 in their numbering plan.

Running no.	EDP- No.	Built	Manufacturer Factory no.	Owner	Operator Route	Location	DBAG BR 088	Image	Remarks	Working
97 501		1922	ME; 4056	Friends of the Honau-Lichtenstein rack railway		Reutlingen			Württemberg tank locomotive, being restored	Museum locomotive
97 502		1922	ME; 4057	DGEG		Bochum-Dahlhausen Railway Museum			Württemberg tank locomotive	Museum locomotive
97 504		1925	ME; 4142	Deutsches Technikmuseum Berlin		Deutsches Technikmuseum Berlin			Württemberg tank locomotive	Museum locomotive

=== Class 98 ===
Class 98 groups all branch line and other remaining locomotives of the Deutsche Reichsbahn.

==== Class 98.3 ====
The locomotives of the Bavarian Class PtL 2/2 with the Royal Bavarian State Railways were light and very compact superheated locomotives for operations on Lokalbahnen. There were three series, of which two were classified as Class 98.3 in the Deutsche Reichsbahn and even survived into the Deutsche Bundesbahn era.

Running no.	EDP- No.	Built	Manufacturer Factory no.	Owner	Operator Route	Location	DBAG BR 088	Image	Remarks	Working
98 307		1909	Krauss-Maffei; 5911	Nuremberg Transport Museum, Nuremberg		German Steam Locomotive Museum (DDM), Neuenmarkt			K.Bay.Sts.B. "4529"	Museum locomotive

==== Class 98.7 ====
The Bavarian BB II were saturated, steam locomotives with the Royal Bavarian State Railways. They were Mallet locomotives.

Running no.	EDP- No.	Built	Manufacturer Factory no.	Owner	Operator Route	Location	DBAG BR 088	Image	Remarks	Working
98 727		1903	Maffei; 2291	Darmstadt-Kranichstein Railway Museum (EMD-K)	Deutsche Museumseisenbahn	EMD-K Darmstadt-Kranichstein			K.Bay.Sts.B. "2527", served until 1972 at Regensburg sugar factory (as Locomotive No. 4)	No

==== Class 98.8 ====
The locomotives of the Class Bavarian Class GtL 4/4 were superheated tank locomotives with the Royal Bavarian State Railways intended for the duties on Lokalbahnen.

Running no.	EDP- No.	Built	Manufacturer Factory no.	Owner	Operator Route	Location	DBAG BR 088	Image	Remarks	Working
98 812		1914	Krauss-Maffei; 6911	UEF		Amstetten			K.Bay.Sts.B. "2562"	No
98 886	098 886-5	1924	Krauss-Maffei; 8275	Eisenbahnfreunde Untermain	Mellrichstadt–Fladungen	Fladungen			K.Bay.Sts.B. "2636", formerly a monument at Schweinfurt	Yes

==== Class 98.70 ====
The Saxon Class VII T engines of the Royal Saxon State Railways were all four-coupled tank locomotives with no carrying wheels. To distinguish the manufacturer a preceding letter was added to the locomotive class, so H VII T meant locomotives built by Hartmann

Running no.	EDP- No.	Built	Manufacturer Factory no.	Owner	Operator Route	Location	DBAG BR 088	Image	Remarks	Working
98 7056		1886	Hartmann; 1435	Dresden Transport Museum		Dresden outside depot (not accessible)			Ex Royal Saxon State Railways 46, badged as Hegel 1431	No

=== Class 99 ===
The DRG Class 99 were steam locomotives for narrow gauge routes and were grouped according to their rail gauge.

==== 1000 mm ====
1,000 mm (3 ft 3 3/8 in) is the most widely used gauge on narrow gauge railways and tramways in Germany.

Running no.	EDP- No.	Built	Manufacturer	Works- no.	Owner	Operator Route	Location	Image	Remarks	Working
99 162		1902	Hartmann	2648	Dresden Transport Museum		Reichenbach/Vogtl.		Ex Saxon I M	No
99 211		1929	Henschel	21443	Wangerooge Island		Wangerooge			Monument
99 222	99 7222-4	1931	BMAG	9921	Harzer Schmalspurbahnen		BW Wernigerode			Yes
99 231	99 7231-5	1954	LKM Babelsberg	134 008	Harzer Schmalspurbahnen		BW Wernigerode, based at Ilfeld			No
99 232	99 7232-3	1954	LKM Babelsberg	134 009	Harzer Schmalspurbahnen		BW Wernigerode			Yes
99 233	99 7233-1	1954	LKM Babelsberg	134 010	Harzer Schmalspurbahnen		BW Wernigerode, based at Ilfeld			No
99 234	99 7234-9	1954	LKM Babelsberg	134 011	Harzer Schmalspurbahnen		BW Wernigerode, based at Nordhausen			Yes
99 235	99 7235-6	1954	LKM Babelsberg	134 012	Harzer Schmalspurbahnen		BW Wernigerode			Yes
99 236	99 7236-4	1954	LKM Babelsberg	134 013	Harzer Schmalspurbahnen		DLW Meiningen			General inspection
99 237	99 7237-2	1954	LKM Babelsberg	134 014	Harzer Schmalspurbahnen		BW Wernigerode			Yes
99 238	99 7238-0	1956	LKM Babelsberg	134 015	Harzer Schmalspurbahnen		BW Wernigerode			General inspection
99 239	99 7239-8	1956	LKM Babelsberg	134 016	Harzer Schmalspurbahnen		BW Wernigerode			Yes
99 240	99 7240-6	1956	LKM Babelsberg	134 017	Harzer Schmalspurbahnen		BW Wernigerode			Yes
99 241	99 7241-4	1956	LKM Babelsberg	134 018	Harzer Schmalspurbahnen		BW Wernigerode			Yes
99 242	99 7242-2	1956	LKM Babelsberg	134 019	Harzer Schmalspurbahnen		BW Wernigerode			Yes
99 243	99 7243-0	1956	LKM Babelsberg	134 020	Harzer Schmalspurbahnen		BW Wernigerode			Yes
99 244	99 7244-8	1956	LKM Babelsberg	134 021	Harzer Schmalspurbahnen		BW Wernigerode, based at Hasselfelde			No
99 245	99 7245-5	1956	LKM Babelsberg	134 022	Harzer Schmalspurbahnen		BW Wernigerode			Yes
99 246	99 7246-3	1956	LKM Babelsberg	134 023	Harzer Schmalspurbahnen		BW Wernigerode, based at Benneckenstein			No
99 247	99 7247-1	1956	LKM Babelsberg	134 024	Harzer Schmalspurbahnen	On loan to IG Selketalbahn	BW Wernigerode, based at Gernrode			No
99 253		1908	Krauss				Regensburg			No
Franzburg		1894	Stettiner Maschinenbau-AG Vulcan	1363	Deutscher Eisenbahn-Verein		Bruchhausen-Vilsen		Ex-FKB 4i, ex "99 5605"	Yes
99 5606		1894	Stettiner Maschinenbau-AG Vulcan	1379	Ernst Paul Lehmann Patentwerk		Nürnberg		Ex-FKB 5i	No
Spreewald		1917	Jung	2519	Deutscher Eisenbahn-Verein		Bruchhausen-Vilsen		Ex Pillkall branch line no. "23", ex Spreewaldbahn "99 5633"	Yes
99 5703		1897	Hohenzollern	940	Spreewaldmuseum Lübbenau		Lübbenau		Ex-Spreewaldbahn LÜBBEN, not accessible	Monument
99 5901	99 5901-6	1897	Jung	258	Harzer Schmalspurbahnen		BW Wernigerode		Ex-NWE 11	Yes
99 5902	99 5902-4	1897	Jung	261	Harzer Schmalspurbahnen		BW Wernigerode		Ex-NWE 12	Yes
99 5903	99 5903-2	1898	Jung	345	Harzer Schmalspurbahnen		BW Wernigerode		Ex-NWE 13	No
99 5906	99 5906-5	1918	Maschinenfabrik Karlsruhe	2052	Harzer Schmalspurbahnen		BW Wernigerode, based at Gernrode		Ex-NWE 41	Yes
99 6001	99 6001-4	1939	Krupp	1875	Harzer Schmalspurbahnen		BW Wernigerode, based at Gernrode			Yes
99 6101	99 6101-2	1914	Henschel	12879	Harzer Schmalspurbahnen	loan to IG Harzer Schmalspurbahnen	BW Wernigerode, based at Nordhausen			Yes
99 6102	99 6102-0	1914	Henschel	12880	Harzer Schmalspurbahnen	On loan to IG Selketalbahn	BW Wernigerode, based at Gernrode			Yes
99 7201		1904	Borsig	5324	IG Hirzbergbahn					Monument
99 7202		1904	Borsig	5325			Mudau			Monument
99 7203		1904	Borsig	5326	Albtal-Verkehrs-Gesellschaft	UEF Albbähnle	Amstetten		Ex Baden C	Yes
99 7204		1904	Borsig	5327	Märkische Museums–Eisenbahn		Plettenberg			No

==== 900 mm ====
900mm gauge track is only in use in Germany on the narrow gauge railways of Bäderbahn Molli and the Borkumer Kleinbahn.

Running no.	EDP- No.	Built	Manufacturer	Works- no.	Owner	Operator Route	Location	Image	Remarks	Working
99 321	99 2321-0	1932	O&K	12400	Mecklenburg Bäderbahn Molli		Bad Doberan			Yes
99 322	99 2322-8	1932	O&K	12401	Mecklenburg Bäderbahn Molli		Bad Doberan			Yes
99 323	99 2323-6	1932	O&K	12402	Mecklenburg Bäderbahn Molli		Bad Doberan			Yes
99 331	99 2331-9	1951	Lokomotivbau Babelsberg	30011	Mecklenburg Bäderbahn Molli		Bad Doberan			Yes
99 332	99 2332-7	1951	Lokomotivbau Babelsberg	30013	Mecklenburg Bäderbahn Molli		Molli Museum Kühlungsborn-West			No

==== 750 mm ====
Running no.	EDP- No.	Built	Manufacturer	Works- no.	Owner	Operator Route	Location	Image	Remarks	Working
99 516	99 1516-5	1892	Hartmann	1779	Museumsbahn Schönheide				Ex Saxon IV K, "No. 108"	Yes
99 534		1898	Hartmann	2275			Geyer		Ex Saxon IV K "No. 127"	Monument
99 535		1898	Hartmann	2276	Dresden Transport Museum		Dresden Transport Museum		Ex Saxon IV K "No. 128", original	No
99 539		1899	Hartmann	2381	Traditionsbahn Radebeul	Lößnitzgrundbahn			Ex-sächs IV K No. 132	No
99 542	99 1542-2	1899	Hartmann	2384	Preßnitztalbahn		Jöhstadt		Ex Saxon IV K "No. 135"	Yes
99 555		1908	Hartmann	3208	Zittau Railways				Ex Saxon IV K "No. 145"	Being restored
99 561	99 1561-1	1909	Hartmann	3214	Förderverein Wilder Robert				Ex Saxon IV K "No. 151"	Yes
99 562	99 1562-0	1909, Reko 1963	Hartmann	3215	German Steam Locomotive Museum (DDM)		Neuenmarkt		Ex Saxon IV K "No. 152"	No
99 564	99 1564-5	1909	Hartmann	3217	SDG				Ex Saxon IV K "No. 154"	Yes
99 566		1909	Hartmann	3320	Saxon Railway Museum		Chemnitz		Ex Saxon IV K "No. 156"	No
99 568	99 1568-7	1910	Hartmann	3450	Preßnitztalbahn		Jöhstadt		Ex Saxon IV K "No. 158"	Yes
99 574	991574-4	1910	Hartmann	3556	Döllnitzbahn				Ex Saxon IV K "No. 164"	Yes
99 579		1912	Hartmann	3561	Rittersgrün Narrow Gauge Railway Museum				Ex Saxon IV K "No. 169", original	No
99 582	99 1582-7	1912	Hartmann	3593	Museumsbahn Schönheide				Ex Saxon IV K "No. 171"	Yes
99 584		1912	Hartmann	3595	ETM		Prora		Ex Saxon IV K "No. 173"	No
99 585		1912	Hartmann	3597	Museumsbahn Schönheide				Ex Saxon IV K "No. 175"	No
99 586		1913	Hartmann	3606	Traditionsbahn Radebeul e. V.	Lößnitzgrundbahn			Ex Saxon IV K "No. 176"	No
99 590	99 1590-1	1913	Hartmann	3670	Preßnitztalbahn		Jöhstadt		Ex Saxon IV K "No. 180"	Yes
99 594	991594-2	1913	Hartmann	3714	Rügensche Kleinbahn		Putbus		Ex Saxon IV K "No. 184", stored at Putbus	No
99 604		1914	Hartmann	3792	Saxon Narrow Gauge Railway Society		SSB Radebeul		Ex Saxon IV K "No. 194", original	No
99 606		1916	Hartmann	3907	Saxon Narrow Gauge Railway Society		Carlsfeld		Ex Saxon IV K "No. 196"	No
99 608	99 1608-0	1922	Hartmann	4521	SDG				Ex Saxon IV K "No. 198"	Yes
99 633		1899	ME		DGEG	Öchsle	Ochsenhausen		Ex Württemberg Tssd	No
99 637		1904	ME				Bad Buchau		Ex Württemberg Tssd	No
99 651	099 651-2	1918	Henschel	16132	Steinheim an der Murr		Former station at Steinheim an der Murr		Ex Saxon VI K "No. 220", only DB narrow gauge engine with an EDP number	No
99 713	99 1713-8	1927	Hartmann	4670	SDG	Lößnitzgrundbahn	Radebeul			Yes
99 715	99 1715-3	1927	Hartmann	4672	Eigentümergemeinschaft GbR 99 715	Preßnitztalbahn	Jöhstadt			Yes
99 716	99 1716-1	1927	Hartmann	4673	Deutsche Bahn	Öchsle	Ochsenhausen			Yes
99 731	99 1731-1	1928	Hartmann	4678	Saxon Oberlausitz Railway Company	Zittau Railways	Zittau			Yes
99 734	99 1734-5	1928	Hartmann	4681	SDG	Weißeritztalbahn	Hainsberg			No
99 735	99 1735-2	1928	Hartmann	4682	Saxon Oberlausitz Railway Company	Zittau Railways	Zittau			Yes
99 741	99 1741-0	1928	Hartmann	4691	SDG	Weißeritztalbahn	Hainsberg			No
99 746	99 1746-9	1929	BMAG	9535	SDG	Weißeritztalbahn	Oberwiesenthal			No
99 747	99 1747-7	1929	BMAG	9536	SDG	‘‘Weißeritztalbahn’’	Radebeul			Yes
99 749	99 1749-3	1929	BMAG	9538	Saxon Oberlausitz Railway Company	Zittau Railways	Zittau			Yes
99 750	99 1750-1	1929	BMAG	9539	Saxon Oberlausitz Railway Company		Trixi Park, Großschönau			Monument
99 757	99 1757-6	1933	BMAG	10148	Saxon Oberlausitz Railway Company	Zittau Railways	Zittau			No
99 758	99 1758-4	1933	BMAG	10149	Saxon Oberlausitz Railway Company	Zittau Railways	Zittau			Yes
99 759	99 1759-2	1933	BMAG	10150	SDG		Oberrittersgrün Museum			No
99 760	99 1760-0	1933	BMAG	10151	Saxon Oberlausitz Railway Company	Zittau Railways	Zittau			No
99 761	99 1761-8	1933	BMAG	10152	SDG	Lößnitzgrundbahn	Radebeul			Yes
99 762	99 1762-6	1933	BMAG	10153	SDG	Weißeritztalbahn	Hainsberg			Yes
99 771	99 1771-7	1953	Lokomotivbau Babelsberg	32010	SDG	Weißeritztalbahn	Hainsberg			No
99 772	99 1772-5	1953	Lokomotivbau Babelsberg	32011	SDG	Fichtelbergbahn	Oberwiesenthal			Yes
99 773	99 1773-3	1953	Lokomotivbau Babelsberg	32012	SDG	Fichtelbergbahn	Oberwiesenthal			Yes
99 775	99 1775-8	1953	Lokomotivbau Babelsberg	32014	SDG	Lößnitzgrundbahn	Radebeul			No
99 776	99 1776-6	1953	Lokomotivbau Babelsberg	32015	SDG	Fichtelbergbahn	Oberwiesenthal			No
99 777	99 1777-4	1953	Lokomotivbau Babelsberg	32016	SDG	Lößnitzgrundbahn	Radebeul			Yes
99 778	99 1778-2	1953	Lokomotivbau Babelsberg	32017	SDG	Lößnitzgrundbahn	Radebeul			No
99 779	99 1779-0	1953	Lokomotivbau Babelsberg	32018	SDG	Lößnitzgrundbahn	Radebeul			Yes
99 780	99 1780-8	1953	Lokomotivbau Babelsberg	32019	SDG	Weißeritztalbahn	Hainsberg			No
99 781	99 1781-6	1953	Lokomotivbau Babelsberg	32022	IG Preßnitztalbahn	Preßnitztalbahn	Jöhstadt			No
99 782	99 1782-4	1953	Lokomotivbau Babelsberg	32023	Rügensche Kleinbahn	Rügensche Kleinbahn	Putbus			No
99 783	99 1783-2	1953	Lokomotivbau Babelsberg	32024	Rügensche Kleinbahn	Rügensche Kleinbahn	Putbus			No
99 784	99 1784-0	1953	Lokomotivbau Babelsberg	32025	Rügensche Kleinbahn	Rügensche Kleinbahn	Putbus			Yes
99 785	99 1785-ß	1954	Lokomotivbau Babelsberg	32025	SDG	Fichtelbergbahn	Oberwiesenthal			Yes
99 786	99 1786-5	1954	Lokomotivbau Babelsberg	32025	SDG	Fichtelbergbahn	Oberwiesenthal			Yes
99 787	99 1787-3	1955	Lokomotivbau Babelsberg	132028	Saxon Oberlausitz Railway Company	Zittau Railways	Zittau			No
99 788	99 1788-1	1955	Lokomotivbau Babelsberg	132029	Öchsle Bahn AG	Öchsle	Ochsenhausen			Yes
99 789	99 1789-9	1955	Lokomotivbau Babelsberg	132030	SDG	Lößnitzgrundbahn	Radebeul			Yes
99 790	99 1790-7	1955	Lokomotivbau Babelsberg	132031	SDG		Hainsberg			Monument
99 791	99 1791-5	1956	Lokomotivbau Babelsberg	132032	Traditionsbahn Radebeul	Lößnitzgrundbahn	Radebeul			No
99 793	99 1793-1	1956	Lokomotivbau Babelsberg	132034	SDG		Hainsberg			No
99 794	99 1794-9	1956	Lokomotivbau Babelsberg	132035	SDG	Fichtelbergbahn	Oberwiesenthal			Yes
99 4301		1920	Orenstein and Koppel	9418			Gommern station		Monument	No
99 4503		1900	Hartmann	2622	Brandenburg Branchline and Private Railway Museum		Gramzow		Ex Prignitzer Kreiskleinbahn	No
99 4511	99 4511-4	1966	RAW Görlitz		IG Preßnitztalbahn		Jöhstadt		Ex Prignitzer Kreiskleinbahn	Yes
99 4532	99 4532-9	1924	O&K	10844	Interessenverband Zittauer Schmalspurbahnen		Bertsdorf		Ex ‘’Trusebahn’’	No
99 4631	99 4631-0	1913	Vulcan	2896	Rügensche Kleinbahn		Putbus			Monument
99 4632	99 4632-7	1914	Vulcan	2951	Rügensche Kleinbahn		Putbus			Yes
99 4633	99 4633-5	1925	Vulcan	3851	Rügensche Kleinbahn		Putbus			Yes
99 4644		1923	O&K	10501	Prignitz Branch Line Museum		Lindenberg			No
99 4652		1941	Henschel	25983	Förderverein zur Erhaltung of the Rügenschen Kleinbahnen e.V.		Putbus		Assembled from parts of 99 4652 and 798.101 (NICKI + FRANK S)	No
99 4701		1914	Henschel	13022	Ernst Jungk & Sohn (concrete works)		Wöllstein		Monument	No
99 4801	99 4801-8	1938	Henschel	24367	Rügensche Kleinbahn		Putbus			Yes
99 4802	99 4802-6	1938	Henschel	24368	Rügensche Kleinbahn		Putbus			Yes

==== 600 mm ====
Industrial and field railways in Germany mostly ran on 600 mm (1 ft 11 5/8 in) wide tracks.

Running no.	EDP- No.	Built	Manufacturer	Works- no.	Owner	Operator Route	Location	Image	Remarks	Working
99 3301	99 3301-1	1895	Krauss	3311	Cottbus Park Railway		Fürst-Pückler-Park Branitz			Yes
99 3312	99 3312-8	1912	Borsig	8472	Waldeisenbahn Muskau e. V.	Waldeisenbahn Muskau	Weißwasser			Yes
99 3313	99 3313-6	1914	Borsig	8836	Frankfurter Feldbahnmuseum		Frankfurter Feldbahnmuseum		No. 8	Yes
99 3314	99 3314-4	1914	Henschel	15226	Private		Schwichtenberg ??			No
99 3315	99 3315-1	1917	Henschel	15307		Mühlenstroth steam branch line	Gütersloh		Currently: RICHARD ROOSEN	Yes
99 3316	99 3316-9	1916	Borsig	9757	Technikmuseum Speyer		Technikmuseum Speyer			No
99 3317	99 3317-7	1918	Borsig	10306	Waldeisenbahn Muskau e. V.	Waldeisenbahn Muskau	Weißwasser			No
99 3318	99 3318-5	1918	Borsig	10364		Mühlenstroth steam branch line	Gütersloh		Currently: ADOLF WOLFF	Yes
99 3351		1906	Jung	989	Frankfurter Feldbahnmuseum		Frankfurter Feldbahnmuseum			Yes
99 3352		1907	Jung	3450	Dresden Transport Museum		Halle Friedland			No
99 3462		1934	O&K	12518		Mühlenstroth steam branch line	Gütersloh		Currently: MECKLENBURG	Yes

== Locomotives with no class number ==
=== ELNA ===
ELNA stands for Engerer Lokomotiv-Normen-Ausschuß (Enger Locomotive Standards Committee). After the First World War it developed 6 locomotive classes for various duties because many branch line and private railways were forced to modernise their obsolete engine fleets.

Running no.	Built	Manufacturer Factory no.	Owner	Operator Route	Location	Remarks	Working
ELNA 2 BLE 146	1941	Henschel; 24932	DGEG		Bochum-Dahlhausen Railway Museum	AG Jauer-Maltsch (Silesia) "No.142" until 1945. KSE until 1959. Renumbered in 1957 "146 JM" KSchE 1959-1960. Sold by JM to RRE 1960, there until 1964 "146 RRE". 1964-1970 "BLE 146".	No
ELNA 6; 184 DME	1946	Henschel; 25657	Darmstadt-Kranichstein Railway Museum		Darmstadt-Kranichstein	Until 1972 "184 DEG"; employed by the RStE, until 31 Dec 1960 "203 DEG", until 1967 BTh	Yes
ELNA 6; 4	1930	BMAG; 9963	DFS	Ebermannstadt – Behringersmühle	Ebermannstadt station	New-type boiler, ex Hersfelder Kreisbahn "2", ex Eschweil Mining Company "Anna 10"	Yes
ELNA 6 Naumburg 206	1930	Krauss-Maffei; 15721	HC		Kassel Technology Park, Marbachhöhe	Ex-KNE 6, ex KNE 206, formerly a monument	Yes

=== Standard gauge / 1435 mm ===
Running no.	Built	Manufacturer Factory no.	Owner	Operator Route	Location	Image	Remarks	Working
NORDGAU	1853	Maffei	DB Museum		Nuremberg Transport Museum, Nuremberg		Oldest locomotive in Germany, no longer entirely original: new driver’s cab, sectioned	No
Locomotive no. 37			DG 41 096		Klein Mahner station		Ex-Saarbergwerke	No
Locomotive no. 1	1954	Henschel; 25013	DG 41 096		Klein Mahner station		Ex Kelheim/Danube cellulose factory	Yes
TAG 7	1936	Krauss-Maffei; 15585	BLV		Landshut			Yes
2 HOHEMARK	1900	Hagans; 1227	Verkehrsgesellschaft Frankfurt (VGF)		Frankfurt Transport Museum		Typ Klb-L, class Bn2t, delivered on 18 Feb 1901 to the Frankfurter Lokalbahn AG (FLAG)	Museum locomotive
3 LUCI	1916		Bavarian Railway Museum		Nördlingen			No
Locomotive no. 4	1913	Maffei	Bavarian Railway Museum		Nördlingen		Fireless, ex Moosburg clay factory, A.M. Ostenrieder; ex Südchemie, Heufeld	Yes
Locomotive no. 5	1918	Hohenzollern	Bavarian Railway Museum		Nördlingen		Fireless, ex Baden Anillin and Sodafabrik, Ludwigshafen; ex EWAG, Nuremberg	No
LAG 7 FÜSSEN	1889	Krauss-Maffei; 2051	Bavarian Railway Museum		Nördlingen		Oldest operational steam engine in Germany, industrial locomotive at the Baienfurt paper factory, today Stora Enso Baienfurt GmbH	Yes
No.1	1918	Henschel; 13075	Arbeitsgemeinschaft Geesthachter Eisenbahn	Geesthacht-Hamburg-Bergedorf	Geesthacht		"Bismarck" type	No, undergoing general inspection
9 RIES	1941	Henschel	Bavarian Railway Museum		Nördlingen		Ex-Hochofenwerk Lübeck	Yes
TAG 8	1942		Bavarian Railway Museum		Nördlingen			No
EBERMANNSTADT	1923	Hanomag; 94442	DFS	Ebermannstadt – Behringersmühle	Ebermannstadt station		Ploxemam type, new-type boiler, ex locomotive "No. 1", Nuremberg Gas Works, ex STWN 1	Yes
NÜRNBERG	1923	Hanomag; 94444	Energie- and Wasserversorgungs AG Nürnberg	Dampfbahn Fränkische Schweiz	German Steam Locomotive Museum Neuenmarkt		Ploxemam type, new-type boiler, ex locomotive "No. 2", Nuremberg Gas Works, ex STWN 2	Museum locomotive
BRAUNSCHWEIG 2	1925	Jung; 3736	VBV	Asse-Bummler	AW Braunschweig		C n2t, named Pudel, ex BGE 21	Yes
HOHENZOLLERN	1925	Hohenzollern; 1925	VBV		AW Braunschweig		D n2t, named Hamborn	No
TRIANGEL 1	1912	Hanomag; 6358	VBV		AW Braunschweig		B n2t	Museum locomotive
OSCHERSLEBEN	1898	Hanomag; 3126	VBV		AW Braunschweig		Prussian T 3	Museum locomotive
GEISWEID 1	1927	Hanomag; 10565	Saxon Railway Museum (SEM)		SEM, Chemnitz-Hilbersdorf		Class 33.15 Cn2t, ex industrial locomotive at Mannesmann coalworks, ex Südwestfalen steelworks, formerly a monument	Museum locomotive
1	1887	Hohenzollern; 423	EMD-K D-K	Deutsche Museumseisenbahn	BW Darmstadt-Kranichstein		Bn2t, ex ZFE "von Manteuffel 1", ex Neuehoffnungshütte "1"	Museum locomotive
OLGA	1911	Hohenzollern; 25657	EMD-K D-K	Deutsche Museumseisenbahn	BW Darmstadt-Kranichstein		Fireless, B, ex Raschig, ex BASF 13	No
WALDBRÖHL	1914	Jung; 2243	EFO		Dieringhausen		Bt, similar to the Prussian T 3, ex Waldbröl-Bielstein branchline, formerly a monument, being restored	No
21	1915	Humboldt; 2243	EFO		Dieringhausen Railway Museum		Dn2t, ex KFBE 21	No
THEO 4	1951	Krupp; 2825	EFO		Dieringhausen		Ch2t, ex Theodor Wuppermann GmbH, Schlebusch 4	No
No. 30; CHANDERLI	1904	Borsig; 5528	euroVapor	Kander Valley Railway	Kandern		Ex-BOH No. 2, DEBG No. 30, identical with Prussian T 3	Yes
BADENIA 28	1900	Borsig; 4788	AEF	SWEG; Acher Valley Railway	Ottenhöfen ?		Ex-VDD 1, ex DEBG No. 28, ex KMS 28, ex VEE 28, ex AO 28, ex SWEG 28, ex DGEG 28 Badenia, Prussian T 3 drawing (‘‘Musterblatt’’) MIII-4e (1), Lenz variant b., general inspection 5/07	Yes
11	1911	ME; 3630	GES	Tälesbahn	Neuffen		Ex-HzL 11	Yes
1	1872	Hanomag; 996	Deutsches Technikmuseum Berlin (DTMB)		Deutsches Technikmuseum Berlin (DTMB) Berlin		Prussian T0, Braunschweigische Eisenbahn "KIEL", ab 1885 KED Hannover 1417, ab 1895 KED Cassel 1417 and 1467, from 1902 Nörten-Hardenberg sugar factory "No. 1"	Museum locomotive
SCHUNTER	1901	Hanomag; 3653	AHE		Almstedt-Segste station		Prussian T 3, ex BLE Schunter 16, general inspection since 05/06	Yes
7	1907	Borsig 5331	Staufen an der Breisgau		Faustgymnasium Krichelnweg 1, Staufen an der Breisgau		Bn2t, Prussian T 2, retired 1963	Monument
2 GROßFÜRST	1907	Henschel 6238	Private		Broistedt		Ex-Südstormarnsche Kreisbahn	No

=== Industrial locomotives ===
Due to their very specialised construction, industrial locomotives are only sorted by location.

Running no.	Built	Manufacturer	Works- no.	Owner	Operator Route	Location	Remarks	Working
10	1953	Krupp	3113			BW of the Westfälischen Almetalbahn, Altenbeken	Cn2t, Knapsack version, ex Städtische Hafenverwaltung, Hannover; ex Ruhrkohle AG RAG, ex Eisenbahnfreunde Zollernbahn, Ballingen; ex Klützer Ostsee-Eisenbahn KOE, Klütz u.a.	No
AMPFLWANG	1925	Hanomag	9976	Berliner Eisenbahnfreunde		Basdorf		Yes
105	1952	Maschinenfabrik Esslingen	5053			Wutach Valley Railway, Zollhaus-Blumberg station	Cn2t, ex Lonza-Werke Waldshut/Rhein	Monument
41-E	1942	Henschel	25684	DGEG	EBM B-D	Bochum Starlighthalle	Eh2t, ex Hibernia AG 41-E, ex ZuH, ex GBAG 41-E	Monument
43	1906	Krauss-Maffei	5437	EFO		Dieringhausen Railway Museum	Blast furnace locomotive, ex Völklinger Hütte	Museum locomotive
KATRIN		Hohenzollern		EFO		Dieringhausen	Fireless	Museum locomotive
MULDENTHAL	1861	Hartmann	164	Dresden Transport Museum		Dresden Transport Museum, Dresden	Ex-Zwickau coal mine, formerly the oldest preserved steam engine in East Germany	Museum locomotive
HERMANN HEYE	1941	Jung	9246	MEH		BW Hamm-Süd	Ex-Gerresheimer Glashütte	Museum locomotive
RADBOD 3	1906	Hohenzollern	1962	MEH		BW Hamm-Süd	Ex-Hibernia 7C, ex Radbod 3, ex RAG D 712	Yes
44	1953	Hanomag	11945	DDM		Neuenmarkt	Blast furnace locomotive	
OLB No. 2 SCHLÄGEL (ALFRED)	1903	Hohenzollern	1669	EFU	Mellrichstadt-Fladungen railway	Fladungen		Yes
MEVISSEN 4	1952	Krupp		MEM		MEM Minden	Ex-	No
ALICE HEYE	1910	Hohenzollern		MEM		MEM Preußisch Oldendorf	Ex-	No
80 106	1952	ME	5054	DBK HB		BW Crailsheim	Ex-industrial locomotive, Albbruck paper factory "No. 106" at Waldshut, initially grouped into Class 80 as a museum locomotive	No
2	1920	Hanomag	9268	VVM	Kiel-Schönberger Eisenbahn	Schönberger Strand museum station	Ex-Kali-Chemie AG, Werk Ronnenberg "2", 2007 being restored	No
3	1920	Henschel	18038	VVM	Kiel-Schönberger Eisenbahn	Schönberger Strand museum station	Class Thüringen, ex Kali-Chemie AG, Werk Ronnenberg "3"	Yes
NIEDERSACHSEN	1922	Henschel	19248	EHH	Meppen - Essen (Oldenburg)		Ex-Gemeinschaftskraftwerk Haltingen/Ruhr "1", ex DEW Rinteln "3"	Yes
2 HANNIBAL	1955	Krupp	3437	DHEF	Harpstedt - Lemwerder	Harpstedt station	Ex-Stinnes AG, Rosenblumendelle mine "3", ex Wilhelmine Mevissen "1", ex EBV "ANNA N.4" ex FME "80 2001"	Yes
RBW 310	1913	Hohenzollern	3295	Bernd Falk (private)		EM Hermeskeil	Crefeld b, ex RBW "HERMANN 3", ex RBW "310", ex Spielplatzlok, Brühl bei Köln "310", ex MEP "RBW 310"	Museum locomotive
KDL 8	1944	LOFAG		Bernd Falk (private)		EM Hermeskeil	Ex-Industriebahn SBS	Museum locomotive
V	1956	Jung	12037	VEH	Hespertalbahn	Alter Bahnhof Essen-Kupferdreh	Typ CNTL, ex Kraftwerk Cuno in Herdecke/Ruhr, ex Kraftwerk Elverlingsen, general inspection until 12(?)/01	No
VII	1923	Henschel	20143	VEH	Hespertalbahn	Alter Bahnhof Essen-Kupferdreh	Bismarck version, ex Pörtingsiepen VII	No
VIII	1961	Krupp	3435	VEH	Hespertalbahn	Alter Bahnhof Essen-Kupferdreh	Typ Knapsack, ex NBAG VII, ex RAG D-400, ex Bergbau AG Lippe 760-C (Museum locomotive)	Yes
6	1912	Hohenzollern	2015	NLME	Finsterwalde - Crinitz	Kleinbahren museum station	Gerresheim version, ex Ameln 1, general inspection??/05	Yes
EMIL MAYRISCH 3	1940	Hanomag	2154	LEL	Extertalbahn		Ex-RAG Neurath 1, ex RBW 319, ex EBV 3	Yes
13	1945	SACM	8141			Völklingen-Fenne Power Plant	Type 201 Hannibal, ex-Saarbergwerke	Monument

=== 1000 mm ===
Running no.	Built	Manufacturer	Works- no.	Owner	Operator Route	Location	Remarks	Working
NKAG 16^{II}	1900	Henschel	5575	Stadt Nastätten?	Nassauische Kleinbahn	Nastätten	Ex Selters-Hachenburg branch line "No.2"	Monument
7s Mallet	1897	MBG K	1478	Deutscher Eisenbahn-Verein		Bruchhausen-Vilsen	Ex-Albtalbahn	No
Locomotive no. 4 RUR	1899	Henschel	5276	Selfkantbahn		Schierwaldenrath	Box steam loco, to 1971 ex paper factory Schoeller, to 1942 ex DEAG	No
PLETTENBERG	1927	Henschel	20822	Deutscher Eisenbahn-Verein		Bruchhausen-Vilsen	Ex-PlEB 3	Yes
Locomotive no. 20; HASPE	1956	Jung	12783	Selfkantbahn		Schierwaldenrath	1972 ex Klöckner-Hütte Hagen-Haspe	Yes
MEG 46	1897	Grafenstaden	4805	Selfkantbahn		Schierwaldenrath	1997 ex DGEG Viernheim, ex MEG, 1923 ex Strasbourg tramways	No
MEG 101	1949	Krauss-Maffei	17627	Selfkantbahn		Schierwaldenrath	2002 ex VDB Betrieb Worblaufen (CH), ex Eurovapor, ex MEG, ex OEG	Yes
Locomotive no. 21; HAGEN	1956	Jung	12784	Selfkantbahn		Schierwaldenrath	1972 ex Klöckner-Hütte Hagen-Haspe	No
Locomotive no. 19	1956	Jung	12703	Selfkantbahn		Schierwaldenrath	1970 ex Klöckner-Hütte Hagen-Haspe	No
Locomotive no. 5 REGENWALDE	1930	Borsig	12250	Selfkantbahn		Schierwaldenrath	Ex-PKP Tyn 6-3631, ex PLB 148, ex RKB 5c	Under overhaul
HOYA	1899	Hanomag	3341	Deutscher Eisenbahn-Verein		Bruchhausen-Vilsen		Yes
BRUCHHAUSEN	1899	Hanomag	3344	Deutscher Eisenbahn-Verein		Bruchhausen-Vilsen station		Monument
HERMANN	1911	Hohenzollern	2798	Deutscher Eisenbahn-Verein		Bruchhausen-Vilsen	Ex-KAE "Hermann"	No
2s	1901	Borsig	4871	Ulmer Eisenbahnfreunde		Amstetten	Ex-WEG 2s	No
KBT 1	1900	Hanomag		Bürgerverein Findorff		Bremen Hemmstrasse	Cn2t, ex Bremen Tarmstedt branch line	Monument
7	1919	Henschel	17218	EMD-K	Deutsche Museumseisenbahn	BW Darmstadt-Kranichstein	Bn2t, ex Dornap, ex Holzmann	Yes
60; BIEBERLIES	1923	Henschel	19979	MME	Sauerländer Kleinbahn	Plettenberg	Cn2t, ex Gießen-Bieber branch line "No. 2"	Yes
1 FRIEDRICH	1949	Henschel	27119	MME	Sauerländer Kleinbahn	Plettenberg	Bn2t	No
20; PHÖNIX	1950	Henschel	27122	MME	Sauerländer Kleinbahn	Plettenberg	Bn2t	No
HMB 11	1913	ME	3710	Härtsfeld-Museumsbahn e. V.		Neresheim	Ex-Härtsfeldbahn	No
HMB 12	1913	ME	3711	Härtsfeld-Museumsbahn e. V.	Härtsfeldbahn	Neresheim	Ex-Härtsfeldbahn	Yes
				Kalkwerke Oethelshofen Dornap		Wuppertal-Dornap	Former industrial locomotive from a lime works	Monument

=== 750 mm ===
Running no.	Built	Manufacturer	Works- no.	Owner	Operator Route	Location	Image	Remarks	Working
GRÜNER HEINER	1929			Bavarian Railway Museum		Nördlingen		710 mm gauge	No
HELENE	1919	Henschel	16426	WAB		Klütz		Ex-DGEG	No
7	1931	O & K	12348	WAB		??			No
9	1931	O & K	12350	WAB		??			No
1138	1918	Henschel	16020	WAB		??			No

== Locomotives of foreign classes ==
Locomotives of foreign classes, which were not included in the existing numbering scheme.

=== 1524/1520 mm (Russian broad gauge) ===
Running no.	Built	Manufacturer	Works- no.	Owner	Operator Route	Location	Image	Remarks	Working
P36 0123	1955	Kolomna Locomotive Works		Rügen Railway & Technology Museum		Rügen Railway & Technology Museum		ex SŽD П36 (P36) class	No

=== 1435 mm ===
Running no.	Built	Manufacturer	Works- no.	Owner	Operator Route	Location	Image	Remarks	Working
680	1860	StEG	862	Deutsches Technikmuseum Berlin		Deutsches Technikmuseum Berlin		ex-Graz-Köflacher Eisenbahn- und Bergbaugesellschaft (GKB). Oldest preserved complete steam locomotive in Germany. Deutsche Reichsbahn rostered some of this class as 53 7111–7116	Museum locomotive
97.210	1893	Lokomotivfabrik Floridsdorf	862	EMD-K	EMD-K	EMD-K		ex-ÖBB 97.210 (Erzbergbahn)	Museum locomotive
8532; TIGERLI	1915	SLM	2544	euroVapor	Kander Valley Railway	Kandern		ex-SBB E 3/3	No
231.K.22	1916	Ateliers et Chantiers de la Loire	(26)	Süddeutsches Eisenbahnmuseum Heilbronn		Süddeutsches Eisenbahnmuseum Heilbronn		ex-SNCF; rebuilt from PLM 231.C.22, né PLM 6222. Originally preserved at Steamtown (Carnforth)	No
06.013	1930	Borsig	12202	Slovenian Railway Museum, Ljubljana		Bahnpark Augsburg		ex-JŽ class 06	
131.060	1942	Reșița works	611	Historische Eisenbahn Westmecklenburg				ex-CFR 2-6-2T	Yes
Q 350	1945	Frichs	344	Arbeitsgemeinschaft Geesthachter Eisenbahn	Geesthacht - Hamburg-Bergedorf	Geesthacht		Ex-DSB class Q	Yes
F 654	1949	Frichs	358	Interessengemeinschaft Kulturlokschuppen Neumünster		Interessengemeinschaft Kulturlokschuppen Neumünster		Ex-DSB class F	No
1266	1915	Motala Verkstad	554	Schultz Recycling GmbH		Kropp		Ex-SJ class B. Bought by Angelner Dampfeisenbahn in 1982, withdrawn in 1990, sold to Schultz Recycling GmbH in 2005.	No
1916	1952	NOHAB	2217	ADB	Kappeln - Süderbrarup	Kappeln roundhouse		Ex-SJ class S1	Yes
QJ 2655	1978	Datong		Technikmuseum Speyer		Speyer		ex-China Railways QJ	No

=== 1000mm ===
A rack railway steam locomotive from the Austrian Schafbergbahn on loan to the Freilassing Locomotive World.

Running no.	Built	Manufacturer	Factory no.	Owner	Operator Route	Location	Remarks	Working
999.103	1893	Krauss (Linz)	2746	SKGB	Freilassing Locomotive World	Freilassing	Class B1zt-n2, ex SKGLB 3, ex ÖBB 99.7308, ex ÖBB 999.103 Erika, badged SKGB Z 3	

=== 760 mm ===
There are several industrial locomotives of Austrian origin and forest railway locomotives from Romania in 760mm gauge at various German railways or collections, including the German Museum of Technology (Berlin), or in a Wild West Park. Several former 760mm gauge locomotives from Austria run today on German 750mm tracks.

Running no.	Built	Manufacturer	Owner	Operator Route	Location	Remarks	Working
719	1908	LOFAG; 1806	DM	Freilassing Locomotive World	Freilassing	Rack railway locomotive, bosn. IIIc, Typ C2zzst-n4, ex BHStB/BHLB/SHS IIIc 719, ex JDŽ/JŽ 97-019	Museum locomotive
ÖBB 298.14	1898	Krauss; 3816	Private		Bieringen	Ex-Liestal-Waldenburg, ex DRB 99 7843, ex kkStB U.14, built for narrow gauge railway Röwersdorf-Hotzenplotz	Currently dismantled

=== 610 mm ===
State railway locomotives of foreign origin.

Running no.	Built	Manufacturer	Works- no.	Owner	Operator Route	Location	Image	Remarks	Working
NGG 13 No. NG 78	1929	Hanomag	10630	Deutsches Technikmuseum Berlin (DTMB)		Berlin		Ex-SAR	No
NGG 13 No. NG 83	1929	Hanomag	10635	Private owner: Dr. Muhr				Ex-SAR	No

=== 600 mm ===
Industrial and field railways (Feldbahnen) in Germany mostly run on 600 mm (1 ft 11 5/8 in) wide track.

Running no.	Built	Manufacturer	Works- no.	Owner	Operator Route	Location	Image	Remarks	Working
4	1909	Orenstein & Koppel	3902	FFM		FFM Frankfurt am Main		Mallet locomotive, ex Gending sugar factory, Ostjava	Yes
215	1916	Baldwin Locomotive Works	43367	Dresden Transport Museum		FFM Frankfurt		Péchot-Bourdon locomotive, on loan since 2019	Museum locomotive
7	1915	Decauville	1593	FFM		FFM Frankfurt		ex-chrome mine in Greece	Yes

== See also ==
- List of DRG locomotives and railcars

== Sources ==
- Bernhard Uhle (Hrsg.): Kursbuch der deutsche Museums-Eisenbahnen 2007. Verlag Uhle & Kleimann, Lübbecke 2007. ISBN 3-928959-47-6
