= Traditionsbetriebswerk Stassfurt =

Coordinates: 51°50′10″N 11°35′23″E

The Traditionsbetriebswerk Stassfurt (Stassfurt Heritage Locomotive Depot) is a German railway motive power depot at Stassfurt in the state of Saxony-Anhalt that was opened in 1856. Today the locomotive depot, that lies on the Schönebeck to Güsten railway line, is operated by the society Eisenbahnfreunde Traditionsbahnbetriebswerk Staßfurt (Railway Friends of the Stassfurt Heritage Locomotive Depot).

The locomotive roundhouse, with its 20m turntable, is over 100 years old and can accommodate 24 locomotives. Until 1988, DRG Class 41 and Class 50 steam locomotives were deployed from here on regular passenger, fast-stopping and freight services.
