= Saxon-Upper Lusatian Railway Company =

Logo Sächsisch-Oberlausitzer Eisenbahngesellschaft 2016

The Saxon-Upper Lusatian Railway Company (Sächsisch-Oberlausitzer Eisenbahngesellschaft or SOEG) is a German railway company based in Saxony. It is the owner and operator of the Zittau narrow gauge railway.

== History ==
The SOEG was founded on 28 July 1994 by the district of Zittau and several neighbouring communities on the Zittau railway. On 15 November 1996 it was given the licence for the narrow gauge line from Zittau to Oybin and Jonsdorf as an official railway operator and railway infrastructure company. On 1 December 1996 responsibility for working the narrow gauge line was finally transferred to the SOEG.

From 2002 to 2003 the SOEG had a stake in the Saxon-Bohemian Railway Company with its headquarters in Seifhennersdorf.
