= Beekbergen =

Village in the Dutch province Gelderland

- Village
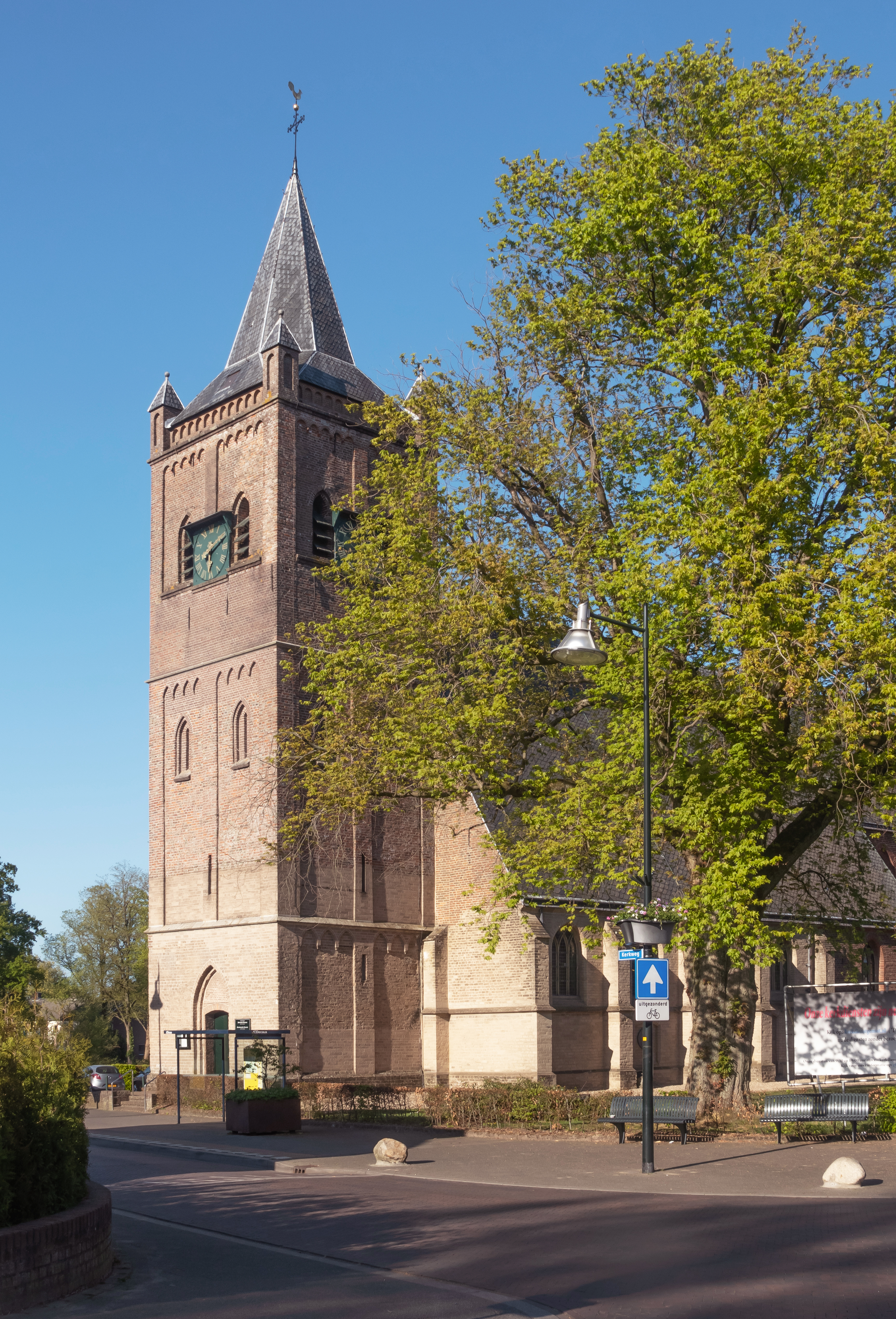
- The village's 15th-century church
- Interactive map of Beekbergen
- Location within Gelderland Location within the Netherlands
- Coordinates: 52°09′30″N 5°58′00″E
- Country: Netherlands
- Province: Gelderland
- Municipality: Apeldoorn

Area
  - Total: 25.17 km^{2} (9.72 sq mi)
  - Land: 25.17 km^{2} (9.72 sq mi)
  - Water: 0.00 km^{2} (0 sq mi)
- Elevation: 28 m (92 ft)

Population (1 January 2020)
  - Total: 4,955
  - Density: 196.9/km^{2} (509.9/sq mi)
- Time zone: UTC+1 (CET)
  - Summer (DST): UTC+2 (CEST)
- Postcodes: 7360, 7361
- Area code: 055

Beekbergen (Dutch pronunciation: [ˈbeːɡbɛrɣə(n)]; Low German: Bekbargen or Beekbargen) is a village and former municipality in the Dutch province of Gelderland. It is located in the municipality of Apeldoorn on the edge of the Veluwe. The rural area on the southwestern side of the village is dominated by forests and the rural area on the northeastern side by agricultural land. A hamlet called Engeland is situated inside the rural area that is part of Beekbergen, as well as several holiday villages, campsites and hotels. The village also houses a number of retirement homes and a homeless shelter, called "Het Hoogeland". Beekbergen had 4,546 residents on 1 January 2016, of which about three out of five people were living inside the urban area.

Beekbergen was a separate municipality until 1818, when it became a part of Apeldoorn.

There is a Beekbergen railway station, situated about a kilometer outside of Beekbergen, in the village of Lieren. This station is home to a steam railway that runs from Dieren to Apeldoorn over a former passenger railway line, operated by the Veluwsche Stoomtrein Maatschappij. The VSM engine sheds are located at 'Beekbergen'.

== Watermills ==
Three overshot watermills were located along the Oude Beek, a stream, that were used to produce paper. Two of them were called Tullekensmolen – one of them was situated south of the stream and the other one north of it. Both mills burned down in 1872 when they were owned by a family called Dijkgraaf, but only the one on the south bank was rebuilt.

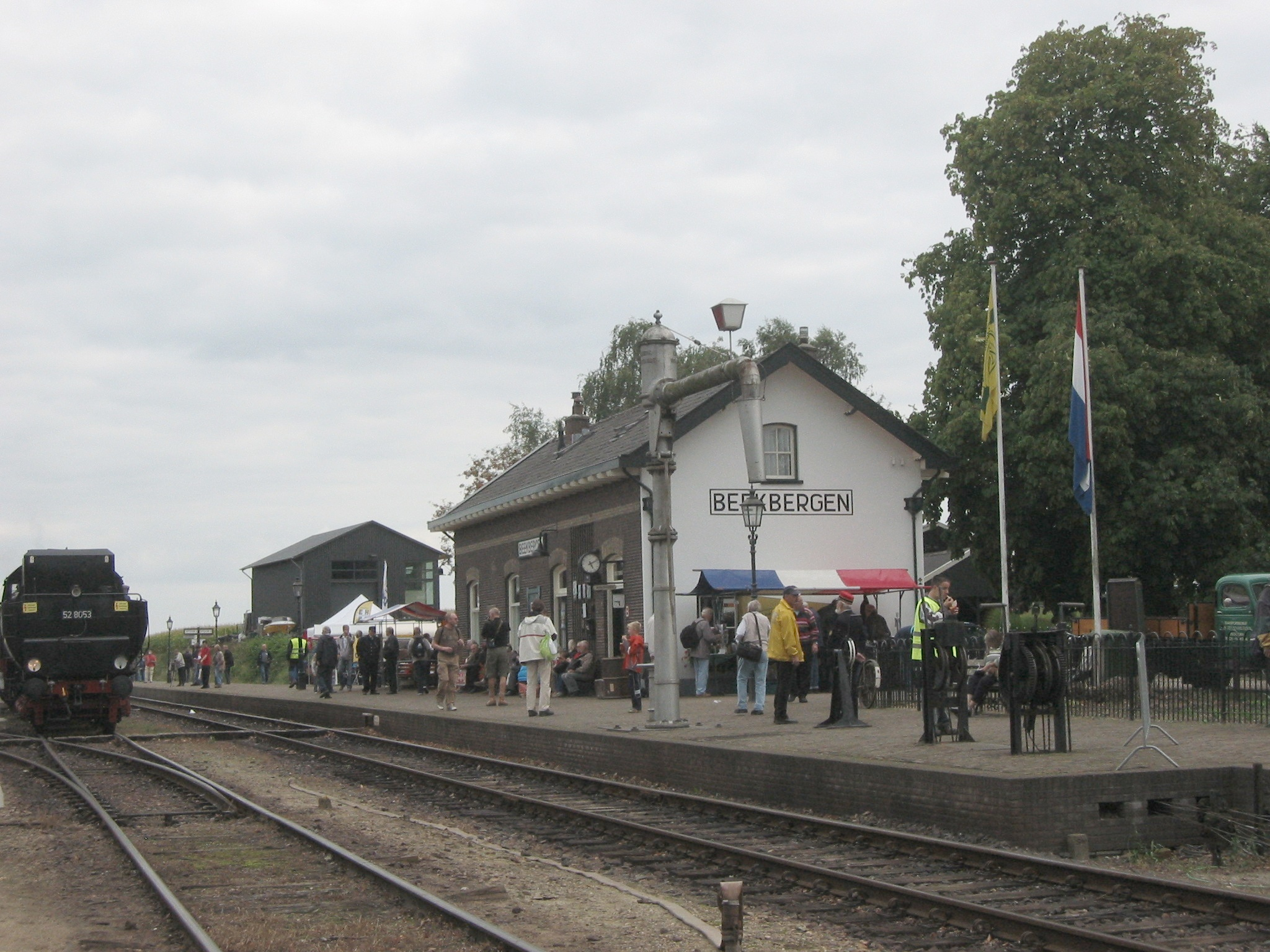
Station Beekbergen

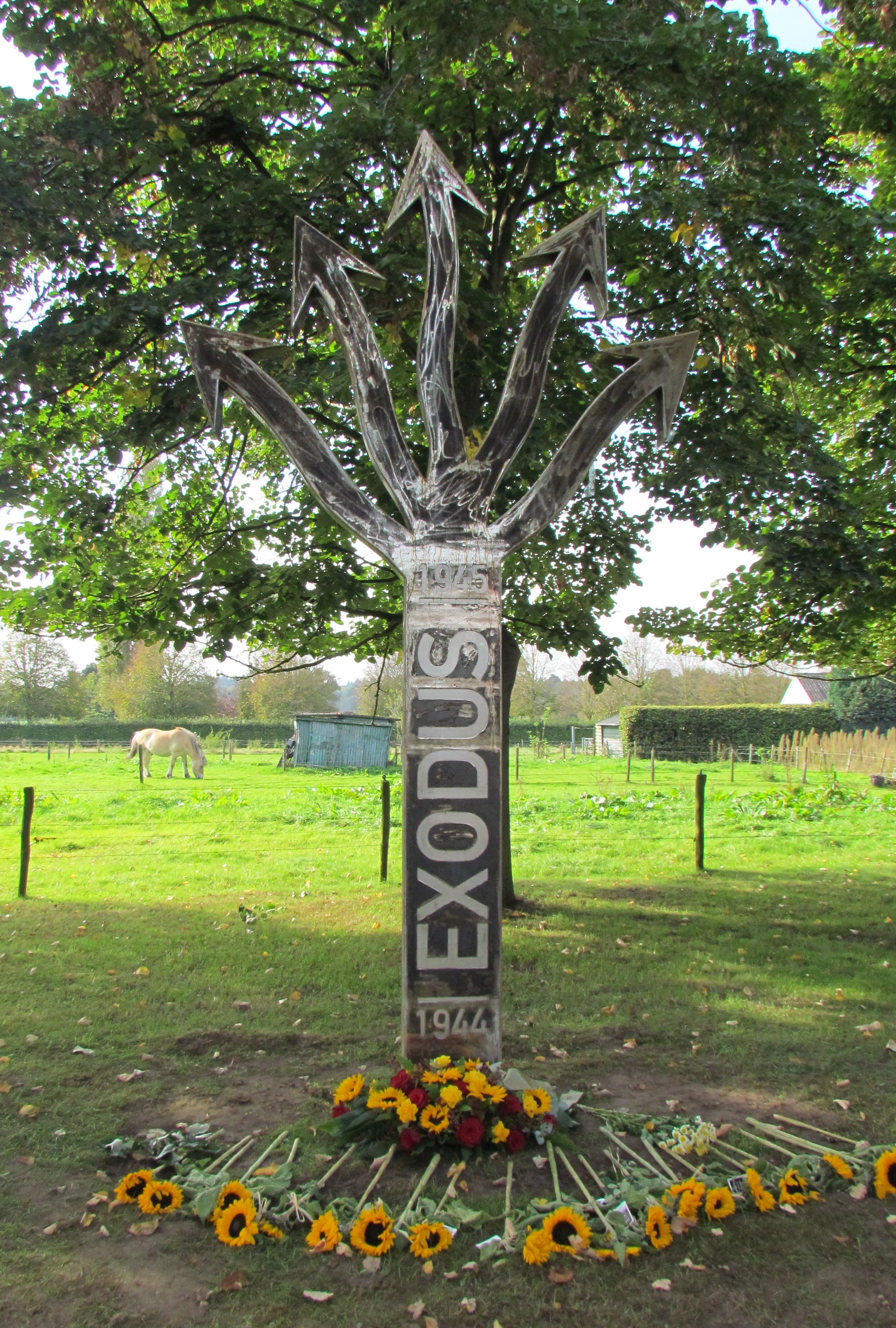
Exodus, World War II monument
