= Veluwsche Stoomtrein Maatschappij =

Dutch heritage railway

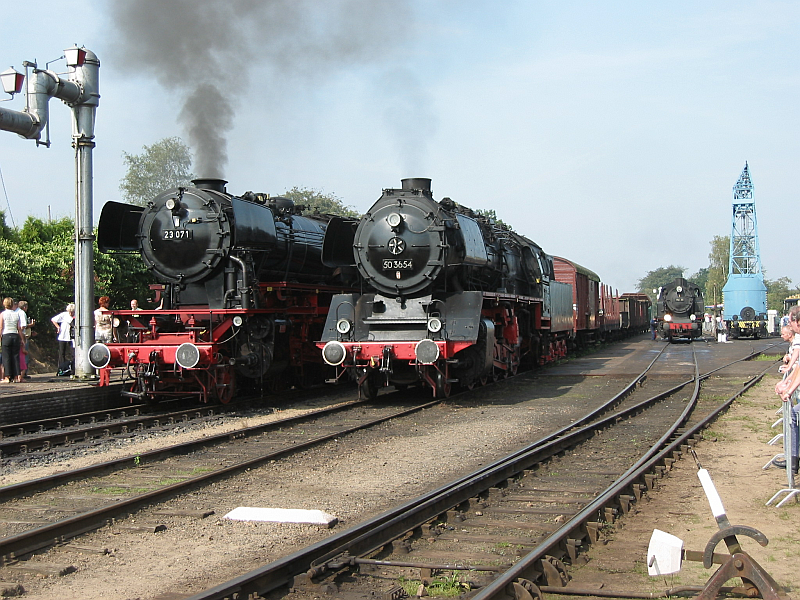
Two German locomotives of the VSM.

Veluwse Stoomtrein Maatschappij (Dutch pronunciation: [ˈveːlyusə ˈstoːmtrɛi ˌmaːtsxɑpɛi]) (VSM) is a Dutch heritage railway between Apeldoorn and Dieren. It passes through the villages of Lieren/Beekbergen, Loenen, and Eerbeek. VSM operates mainly during the summer vacation since its rides on steam trains are popular with tourists visiting the region. VSM was founded in 1975 and is operated by volunteers.

In March 2011, one of the individuals who possessed a number of locomotives decided to sell his collection. This could have meant that VSM would lose some of the biggest and most popular locomotives in their collection. VSM decided to buy the whole collection in order to keep for future generations.

== Back to Then ==
Each year, on the first full weekend of September, the "Back to Then" (Dutch: Terug naar Toen) event is held, using everything that will run. Usually a number of guest locomotives appear as well.

The last run on Saturday used to be the highlight of the event until 2007, originating in Apeldoorn. The train was pushed and pulled by all operational steam locomotives. In 2005 and 2006 that was 10 engines and a number of carriages.

=== Locomotives ===
As of 2018, VSM has 19 steam locomotives and 23 diesel engines. Also over 20 passenger coaches and several goods wagons. The rolling stock is usually stationed at the VSM's depot at Beekbergen.

Most of the steam engines originate from Germany, from the Deutsche Bundesbahn and the Deutsche Reichsbahn. There are also 2 locomotives from Poland, and one from Austria. VSM displays engines of classes 23, 44, 50, 52.80, 64, 80, 41 and the Polish TKp. Most of these were built in the 1940 or 1950s. The oldest locomotive owned by the VSM is number 80 036 (DRG Class 80) from 1929, and which has been at the VSM since 1976.

The diesel engines are originally from the Dutch state railways, Nederlandse Spoorwegen (NS). This way the VSM has a valuable collection of Dutch diesel engines dating from the fifties and sixties from the last century. Present are locomotors (serie 200/300), shunters (serie 500/600) and main line engines (series 2200/2300 and 2400/2500). Passenger coaches available from the NS are six ‘Blokkendozen’ (Mat '24), eleven ‘Bolkoppen’ (Plan D and Plan K) and two steel guard coaches. Also eight Austrian carriages with two axles and open platforms. Also present are 3 Wagon Lits dining cars and 3 Mitropa cars. Most of these are licensed to run on the Dutch railways. Among the other items there are a coaling crane and an accident crane from the NS.
