= DRG Class 80 =

German steam locomotive

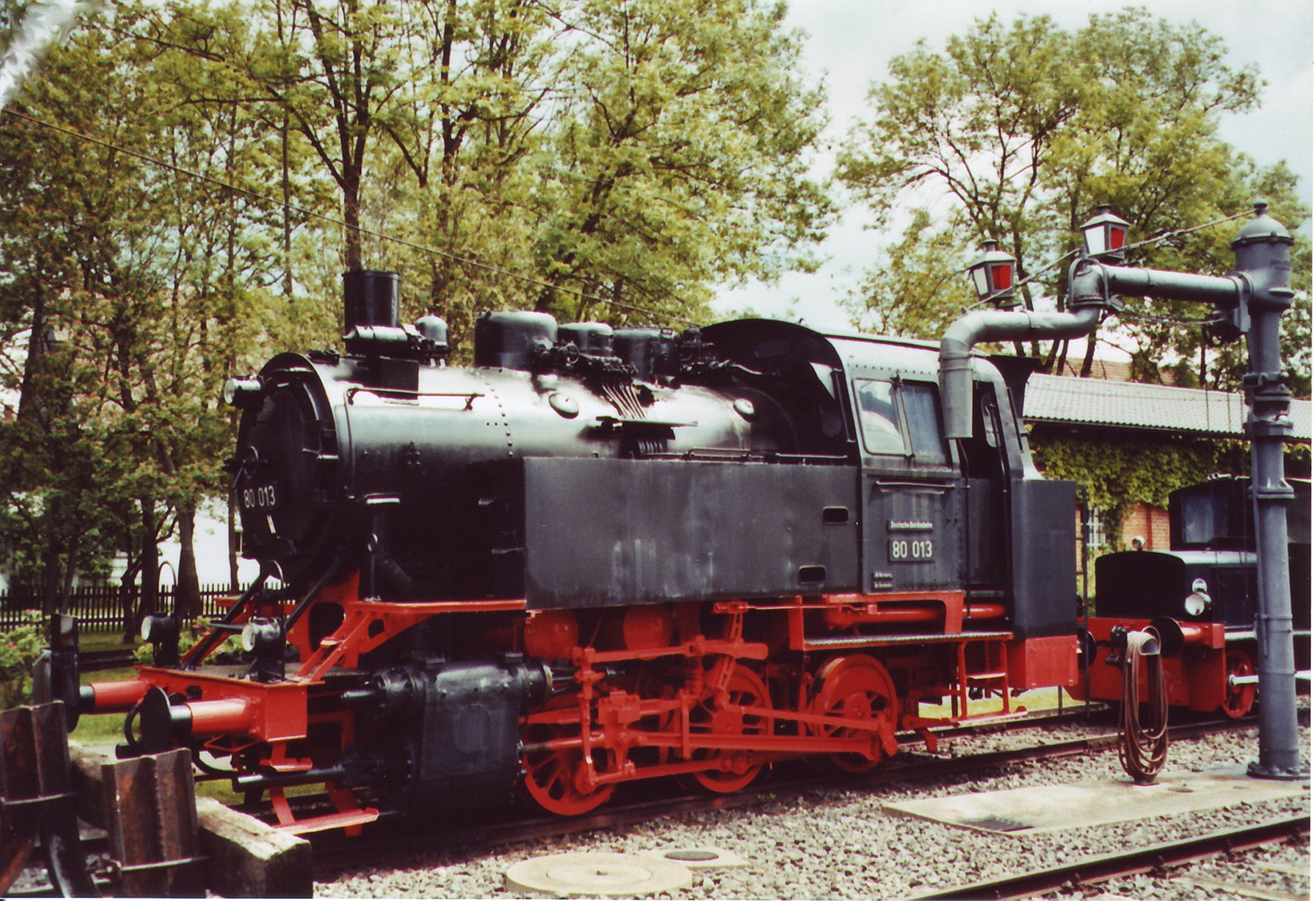
- 80 013 in Neuenmarkt-Wirsberg, June 2006
Type and origin
- Power type: Steam
- Builder: Hohenzollern (22); Union (7); Wolf (5); Jung (5)
- Build date: 1927–1928
- Total produced: 39
Specifications
- Configuration
  - Whyte: 0-6-0T
  - UIC: C h2t
  - German: Gt 33.17
- Gauge: 1,435 mm (4 ft 8 1/2 in)
- Driver dia.: 1,100 mm (3 ft 7 1/4 in)
- Wheelbase
  - Axle spacing (Asymmetrical): 1,600 mm (5 ft 3 in) +; 1,600 mm (5 ft 3 in) =
  - Engine: 3,200 mm (10 ft 6 in)
- Length
  - Over headstocks: 8,370 mm (27 ft 5 1/2 in)
  - Over buffers: 9,670 mm (31 ft 8 3/4 in)
- Height: 4,165 mm (13 ft 8 in)
- Axle load: 18.1 t (17.8 long tons; 20.0 short tons)
- Adhesive weight: 54.4 t (53.5 long tons; 60.0 short tons)
- Empty weight: 44.3 t (43.6 long tons; 48.8 short tons)
- Service weight: 54.4 t (53.5 long tons; 60.0 short tons)
- Fuel type: Coal
- Fuel capacity: 2.0 t (2.0 long tons; 2.2 short tons)
- Water cap.: 5 m^{3} (1,100 imp gal; 1,320 US gal)
- Firebox
  - Grate area: 1.52 m^{2} (16.4 sq ft)
- Boiler
  - Pitch: 2,700 mm (8 ft 10 1/4 in)
  - Tube plates: 2,500 mm (8 ft 2 3/8 in)
  - Small tubes: 44.5 mm (1 3/4 in), 114 off
  - Large tubes: 118 mm (4 5/8 in), 32 off
- Boiler pressure: 14 bar (14.3 kgf/cm^{2}; 203 psi)
- Heating surface
  - Firebox: 6.60 m^{2} (71.0 sq ft)
  - Tubes: 35.37 m^{2} (380.7 sq ft)
  - Flues: 27.65 m^{2} (297.6 sq ft)
  - Total surface: 69.62 m^{2} (749.4 sq ft)
- Superheater
  - Heating area: 25.50 m^{2} (274.5 sq ft)
- Cylinders: Two, outside
- Cylinder size: 450 mm × 550 mm (17 11/16 in × 21 5/8 in)
- Parking brake: K-GP mZ counterweight handbrake
Performance figures
- Maximum speed: 45 km/h (28 mph)
- Indicated power: 575 PS (423 kW; 567 hp)
- Brakeforce: Direct-release Knorr compressed-air brakes
Career
- Operators: Deutsche Reichsbahn
- Numbers: 80 001 – 80 039
- Retired: 1977
- Disposition: Seven preserved, remainder scrapped

The Class 80 tank engines were German standard locomotives (Einheitsloks) with the Deutsche Reichsbahn. They were intended to replace the aging state railway line engines on shunting duties at large stations.

== History ==
39 examples were built in 1927 and 1928 at the locomotive factories of Jung in Jungenthal, Union Gießerei in Königsberg, Wolf and Hohenzollern. With the development of the Class 80, a relatively economical and simple design, it was hoped that the cost of shunting duties would come down.

Prior to the Second World War they worked primarily in the area of Leipzig (including the shunting of post vans) and Cologne. After 1945 22 were sent to the DR in East Germany and 17 to the Deutsche Bundesbahn. They were in service with the DR until 1968.

The last Bundesbahn engine was withdrawn in the Federal Republic of Germany in 1965. Several examples survived in the Ruhrgebiet until 1977 as industrial locomotives with the Ruhrkohle AG.

== Preserved examples ==
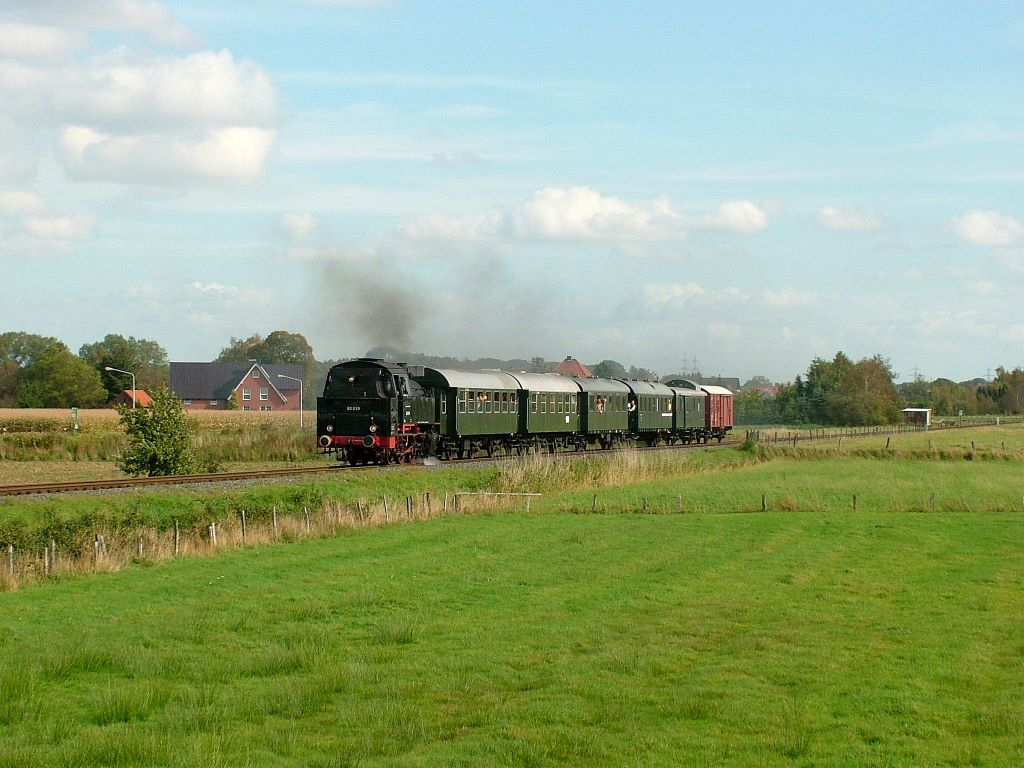
80 039 with its Hamm Museum Railway train near Uentrop

Seven of the class have been preserved:

- 80 009 is privately owned by Peter Haschke, and stands in his garden.
- 80 013 (Hagans factory no. 1227, 1927) is non-operational at the German Steam Locomotive Museum in Neuenmarkt-Wirsberg.
- 80 014 has been cosmetically restored and currently at the South German Railway Museum, Heilbronn (Süddeutsches Eisenbahnmuseum Heilbronn).
- 80 023 has belonged to the Dresden Transport Museum since 1981. It is maintained by IG Bahnbetriebswerk Dresden-Altstadt in the Dresden-Altstadt shed.
- 80 030, in photo-livery at the Bochum Dahlhausen Railway Museum.
- 80 036 of the Dutch Steam Locomotive Union Veluwsche Stoomtrein Maatschappij is currently undergoing a major overhaul and will be back in service for heritage trips.
- 80 039 is in working condition for use on specials by the Hamm Museum Railway.

== See also ==
- List of DRG locomotives and railbuses
