= Apeldoorn =

City in Gelderland, Netherlands

Apeldoorn Apeldoorne (Veluws)
- City and Municipality
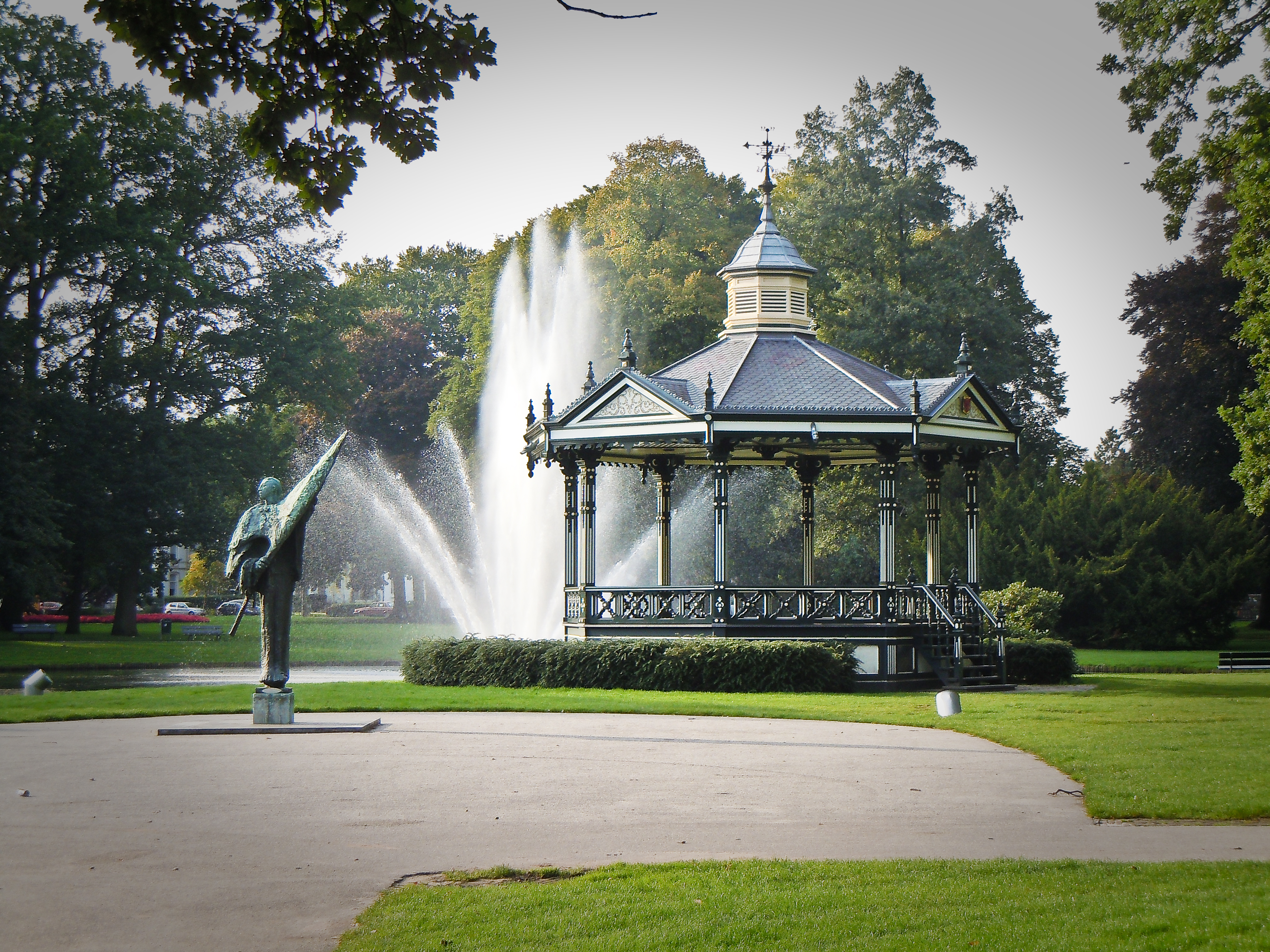
- Oranjepark in Apeldoorn

- Flag Coat of arms
- Interactive map of Apeldoorn
- Location within the Netherlands Location within Europe
- Coordinates: 52°13′N 5°58′E
- Country: Netherlands
- Province: Gelderland

Government
  - Body: Municipal council
  - Mayor: Ton Heerts (PvdA)

Area
  - Municipality: 341.15 km^{2} (131.72 sq mi)
  - Land: 339.89 km^{2} (131.23 sq mi)
  - Water: 1.26 km^{2} (0.49 sq mi)
- Elevation: 16 m (52 ft)

Population (Municipality, January 2021; Urban and Metro, May 2014)
  - Municipality: 164,781
  - Density: 485/km^{2} (1,260/sq mi)
  - Urban: 157,679
  - Metro: 213,899
- Demonyms: Apeldoornaar, Apeldoorner, Apeldorenaar
- Time zone: UTC+1 (CET)
  - Summer (DST): UTC+2 (CEST)
- Postcode: 3888, 7300–7381
- Area code: 055, 0577
- Website: www.apeldoorn.nl

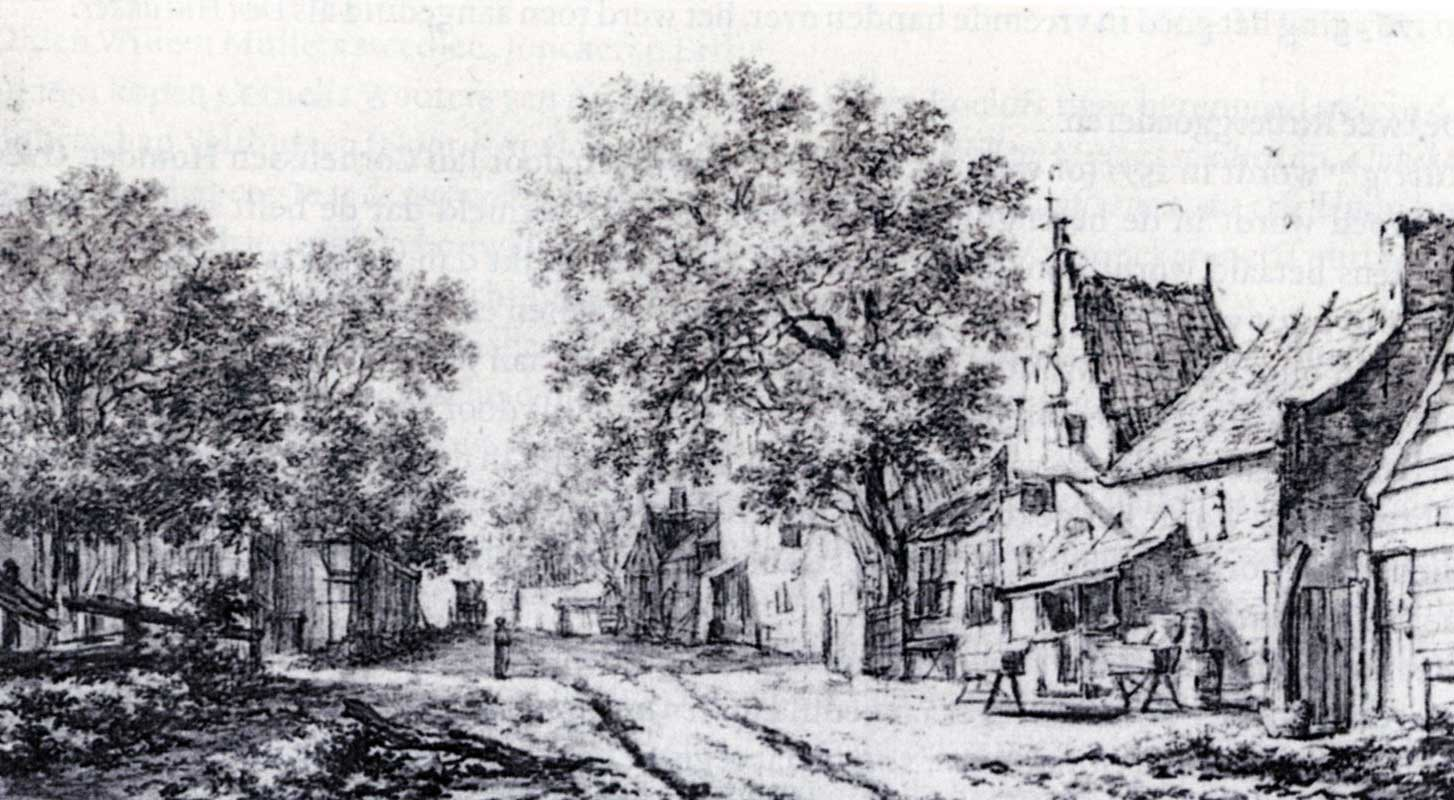
Apeldoorn in the 17th century by Jacob van Ruisdael

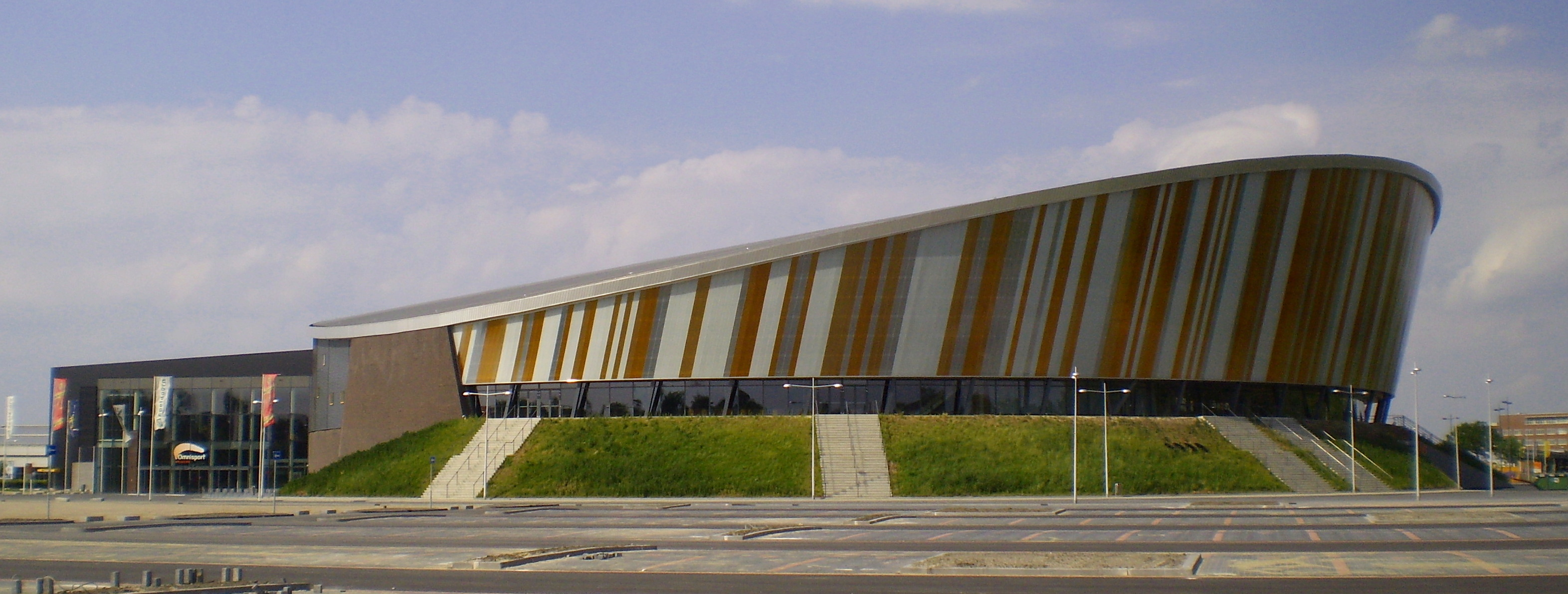
Omnisport Velodrome Apeldoorn

Apeldoorn ([ˈaːpəldoːr(ə)n]; Dutch Low Saxon: Apeldoorne) is a municipality and city in the province of Gelderland in the centre of the Netherlands. The municipality of Apeldoorn, including the villages of Beekbergen, Loenen, Ugchelen and Hoenderloo, had a population of 165,525 on 1 December 2021. The western half of the municipality lies on the Veluwe ridge, with the eastern half in the IJssel valley.

== The city of Apeldoorn ==
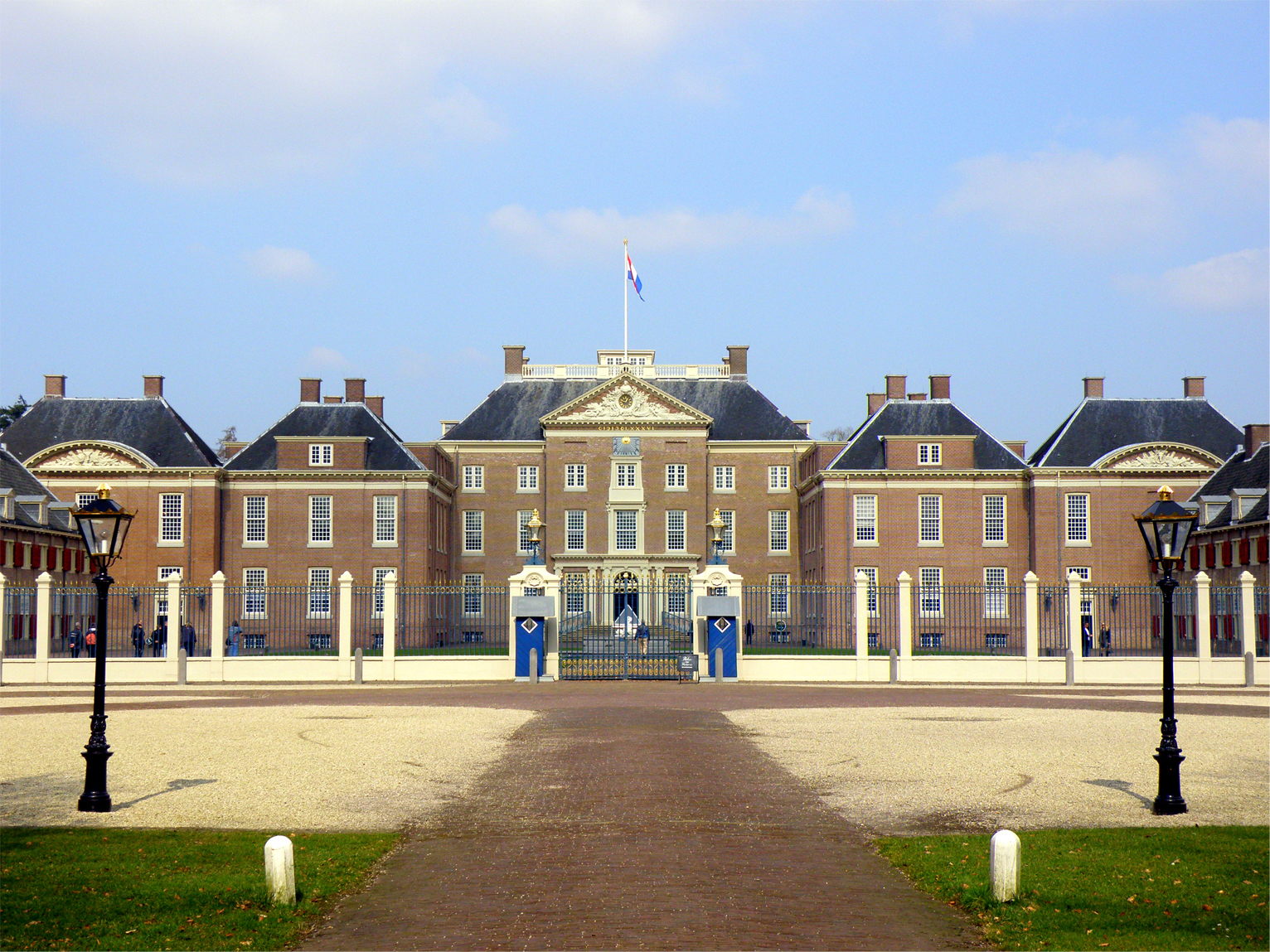
Paleis Het Loo, spring 2012

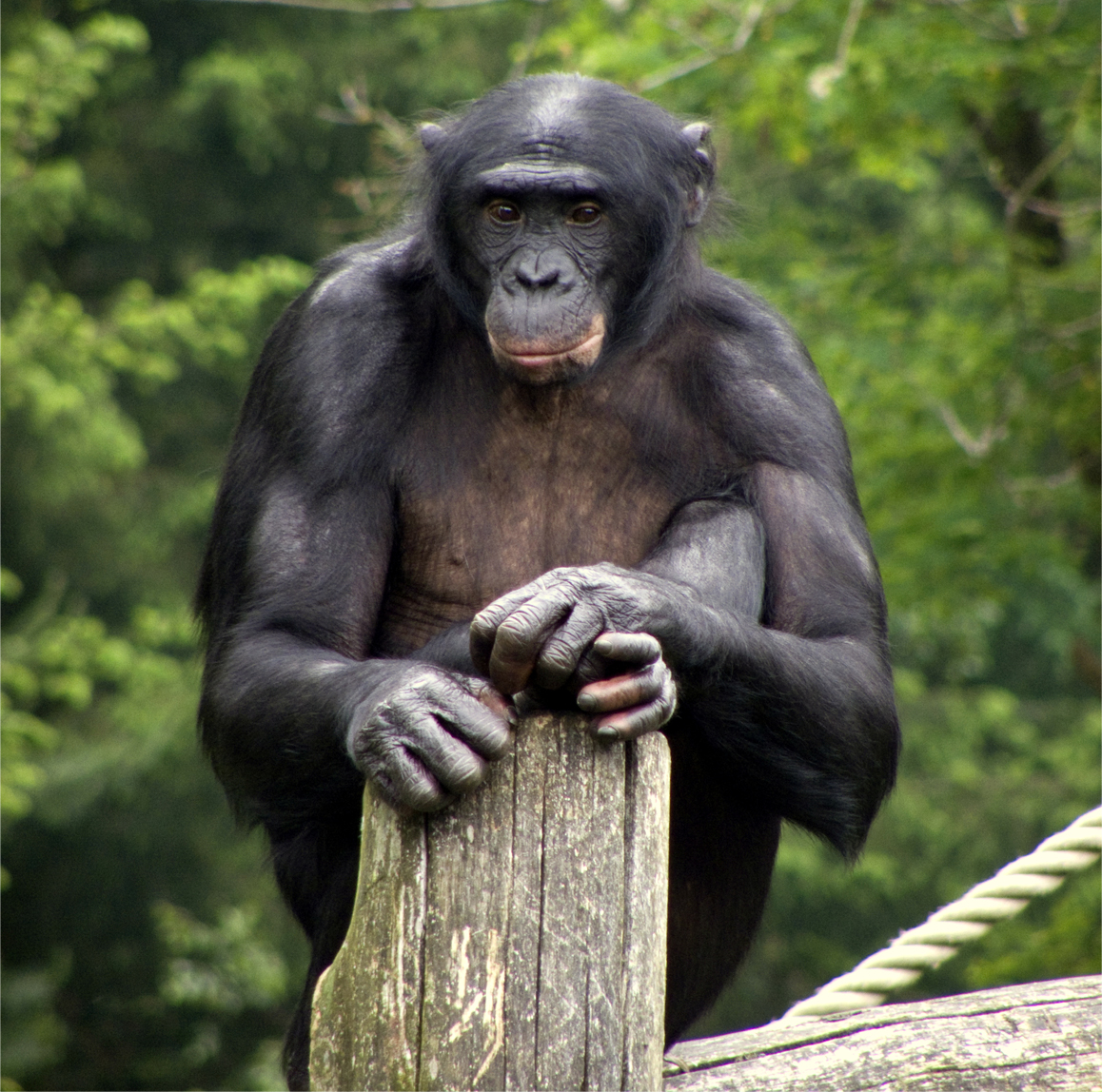
Apenheul ape zoo, male Bonobo

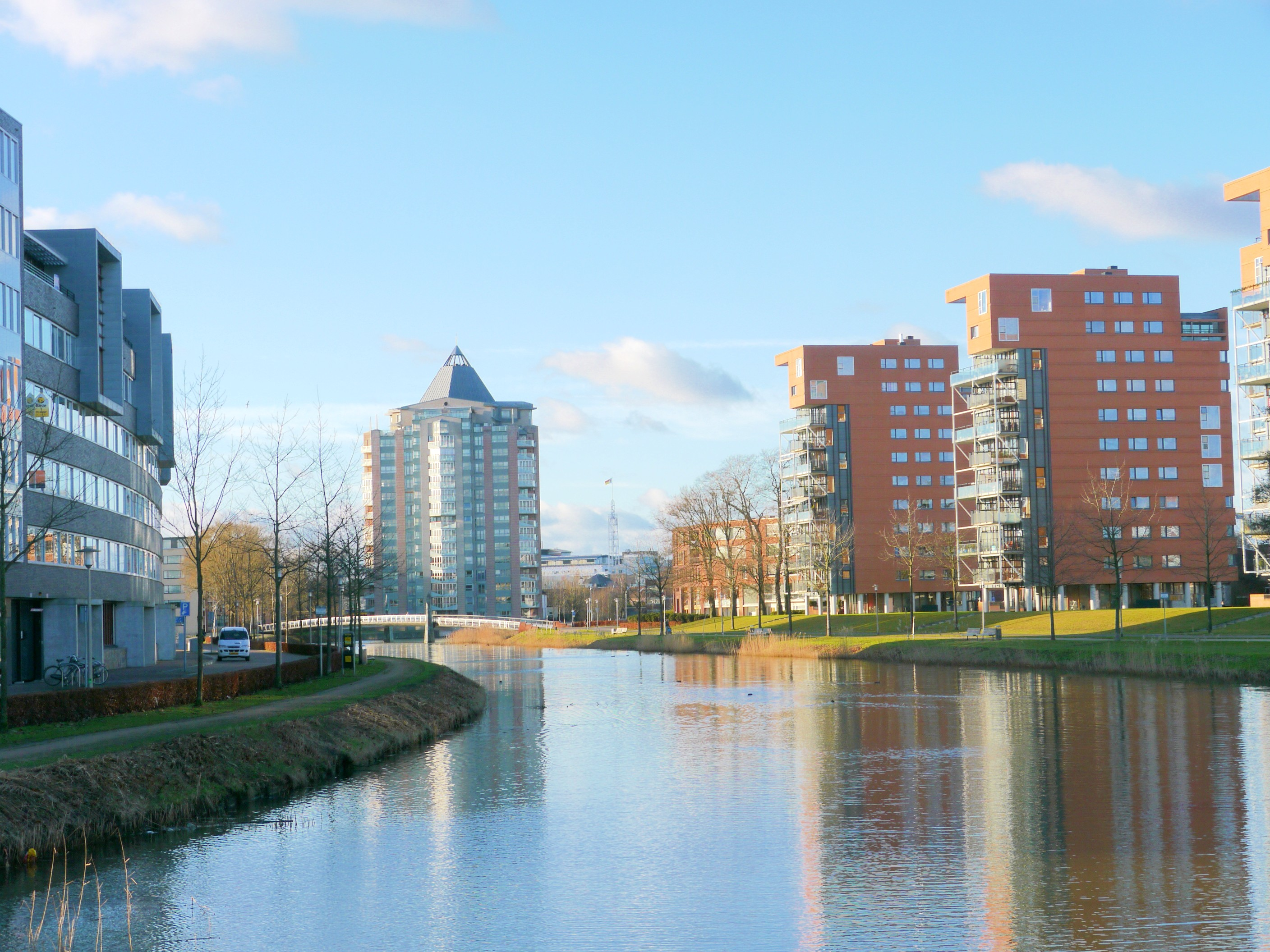
Apartment buildings along the canal

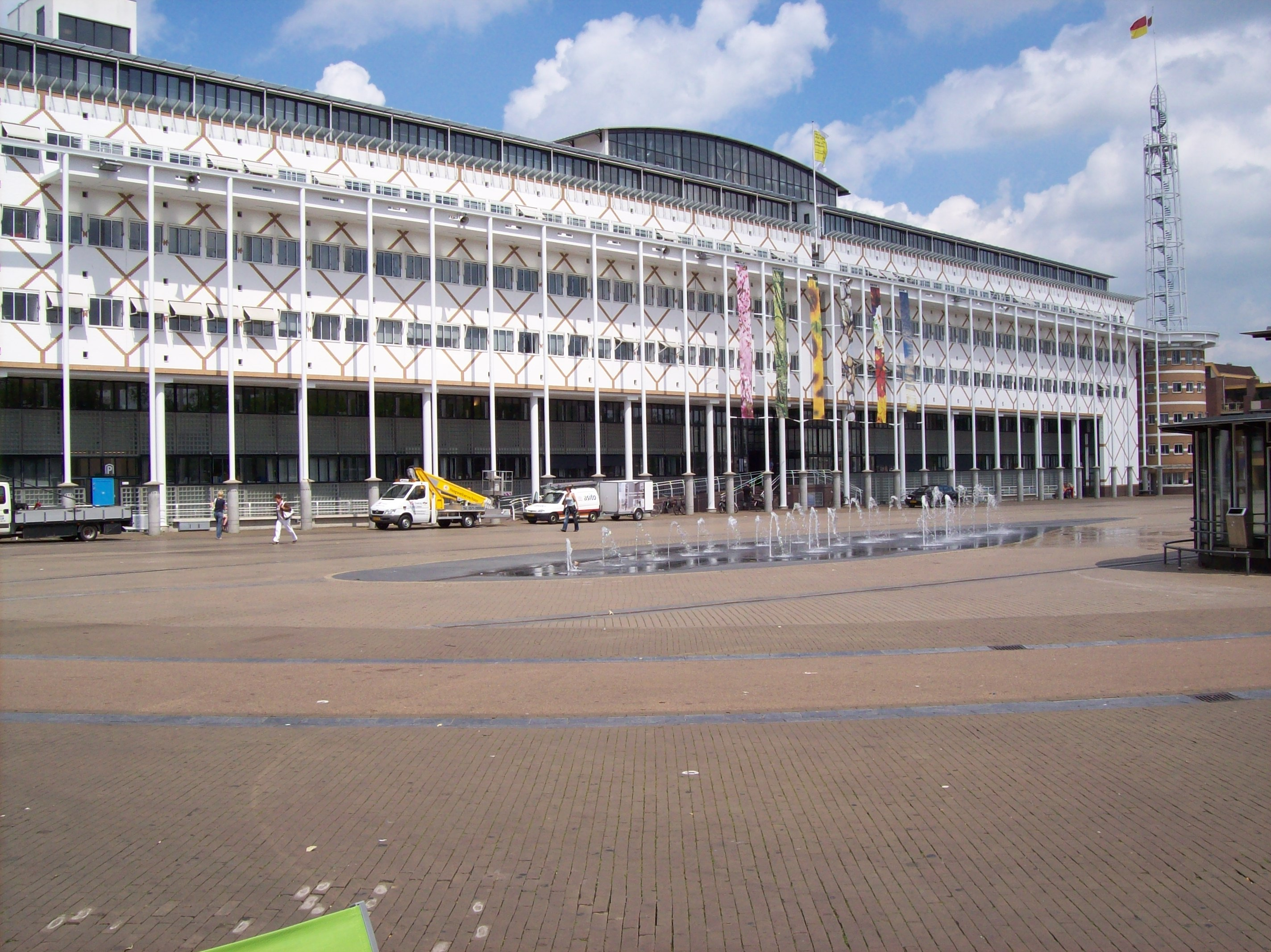
City hall

The oldest known reference to Apeldoorn, then called Appoldro, dates from the 8th century. The settlement came into being at the point where the old road from Amersfoort to Deventer crossed that from Arnhem to Zwolle. A 1740 map refers to it as Appeldoorn.

Close by is the favourite country-seat of the royal family of the Netherlands called the palace het Nieuwe Loo (now Het Loo). It was originally a hunting lodge of the dukes of Gelderland, but in its present form dates chiefly from the time of the then Stadtholder William III of England (1685–1686). The younger sister of Princess Beatrix, Princess Margriet, lives nearby the palace Het Loo, with her husband Pieter van Vollenhoven.

Apeldoorn was a relatively insignificant place until the major building projects of the 19th century and those of the period following World War II. The Protestant church was restored after a fire in 1890. The Roman Catholic Mariakerk is a national monument.

Apeldoorn possesses large paper-mills, many offices (Centraal Beheer, an insurance company; the Dutch Tax services; the "Kadaster", the government land registry service; and some more), a hospital and nursing homes. With over 100,000 people working in the municipality, Apeldoorn is one of the most important employment centres in the eastern Netherlands. Apeldoorn also has several important educational institutes, such as the Saxion University of Applied Sciences (hotel and facility management), the Wittenborg University of Applied Sciences, the Netherlands Police Academy and the Theological University of Apeldoorn.

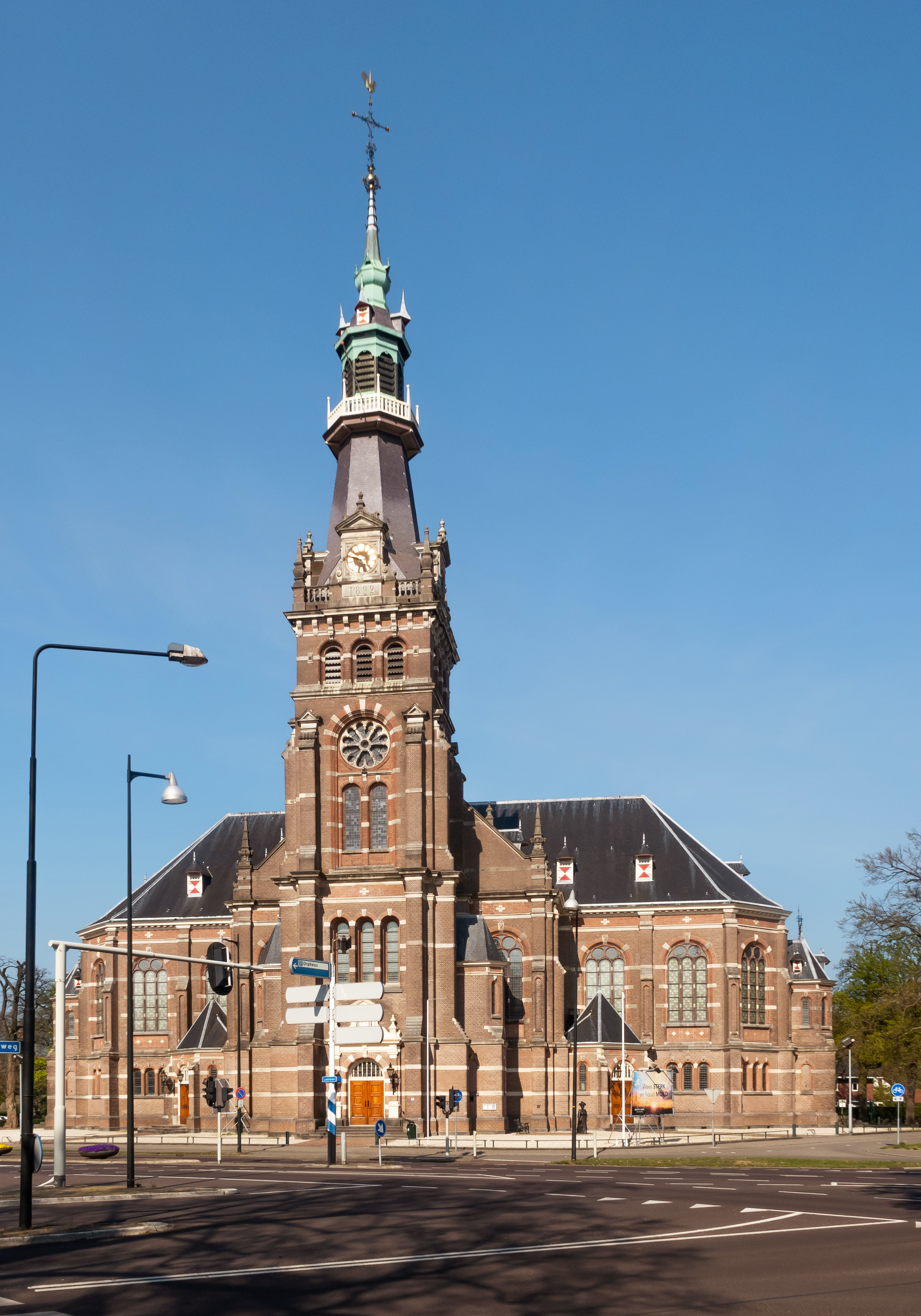
Grote Kerk at Loolaan

Apeldoorn is well suited to logistical and distribution companies because of its location close to the intersection of two major Dutch motorways. The A1 runs west from Amsterdam to the German border, where it leads towards Hannover, and Berlin. The A50 connects the north of the Netherlands with the south.

Apeldoorn used to be well known as a town of paper making and clothes washing companies, due to the clean filtered groundwater which seeped through the sand of push moraines down to the IJsselvallei east of Apeldoorn. In 2008 the largest paper mill of what was left of "Van Gelder Papier" after reorganizations went bankrupt. In 1996 a devastating fire destroyed the remnants of the last part of the original factory. Other parts of the production facility that remained are now in use as a production facility by AFP (Apeldoorn Flexible Packaging B.V.), since early 2021 known as "Trioworld" because AFP merged with "Trioplast", Loparex B.V. and Owens Corning Veil Netherlands B.V. On the entire industrial estate now known as "Van Gelder Park" are now also located a local head office of Rabobank, the main police and fire department offices along with some other local companies.

Apeldoorn has a considerable meat processing industry with production and storage facilities of among others; Vion NV, Van Drie Group (ESA, Ekro), Grolleman Groep (cold stores, transport and meat processing), Amsterdam Meat Company (Ameco). Other big/larger companies or ones that are of local importance include Hanos international (horesca), Hamer B.V. (installation), HSL Logistics (since merged with GVT Logistics), HCA Holland Colours (industrial plastics coloring), Remeha (heating boilers), Royal Reesink N.V. The former distribution centre is now used as a distribution centre for Picnic, an internet grocery home delivery service, although Royal Reesink is still using the office parts of the building.

In August 2018 PostNL opened a large package sorting centre at the Oude Apeldoornseweg, newly built at the industrial area now known as "FizzionParc" but once was known as an industrial estate of Philips Data Systems, the new PostNL location will provide work for around 400 employees.

On 27 November 2018, a rapid spreading fire completely destroyed the largest store of Karwei DIY centres in The Netherlands, located at the Laan van de Dierenriem in Apeldoorn. No one was injured, and as of 2020 the location was rebuilt and reopened. A part of the new building is now up for rent for another business.

Akzo Diosynth once operated a facility that produced base materials for medicine manufacture, but production has since ceased. The terrain located at the Vlijtseweg has been renamed after the product that was produced here before that, Zwitsal. It is now known as "Zwitsal Apeldoorn" and the former facility now houses many new local businesses, such as the beer brewery "De Vlijt".

Apenheul is a zoo which hosts a number of different types of apes and monkeys, many of which are free to walk around the visitors. It is situated at the western edge of Apeldoorn and can easily be reached by local bus. There is also an amusement park situated in Apeldoorn, called the Koningin Juliana Toren (Queen Juliana Tower). It is situated nearby the Apenheul and lies on the road to Hoog Soeren. It is called the Koningin Juliana Toren because of the tower, which was built in 1910 and was later named after Queen Juliana.

The local hospital is the Gelre Hospital "Lukas", offering secondary health care to Apeldoorn and the surrounding towns.

Apeldoorn railway station is, among regular national and international services, the terminus for the Veluwse Stoomtrein Maatschappij, a preserved steam railway that runs to Dieren via Beekbergen.

In April 2009, eight people were killed when a man tried to attack the Dutch royal family during a Queen's Day celebration in the city by crashing his car near the royal family's bus.

The southwestern corner of the municipality is part of the Hoge Veluwe National Park. It is the final Battle Honour of The Royal Canadian Regiment who took part in the town's liberation in World War II.

== House of Orange-Nassau ==
Paleis Het Loo reflects the historical ties between the House of Orange-Nassau and the Netherlands. The central part of the palace and the lateral pavilions show how the palace was inhabited by the House of Orange for three centuries starting with the King Stadtholder William III of England up to and including Queen Wilhelmina.

In November 1684 Prince William III of Orange, then Stadtholder of Gelderland, purchased Het Loo with the intentions of building a palatial hunting lodge somewhere on the property. On 5 April 1685, the first contract was tendered and in September of the same year the stonework of the middle section (or corps de logis) of what came to be known as Het Loo was completed. In 1686, the year given on the facade of the building, the wings, originally linked by colonnades to the corps de logis were added, the walls were built and the gardens were laid out.

Het Loo became the favorite hunting seat and country palace of William III and his wife Queen Mary II, and until his death in 1702 furnishings and decorations both inside and outside underwent repeated alterations and embellishments. At that time symmetry was considered ideal and the design for the building and grounds featured a central axis with mirror image components on either side. Inside the palace the axis consisted of the Entrance Hall, the Staircase and the Great Hall on the first floor. West and east of the Great Hall respectively were the apartments of William III and Mary II. The apartments of the courtiers and the Dining Room were on the ground floor.

In 1689 William III became King of England, Scotland and Ireland and this elevation of his position and power brought an enlargement of Het Loo in its wake. Between 1691 and 1694 the colonnades which linked the corps de logis to the wings on either side were replaced by four pavilions. These pavilions contained the new apartments of William III and Mary II, a new Dining Room, a Long Gallery and a Chapel. Queen Mary did not return to the Netherlands after 1689 and never saw the enlargement.

On the death of King William III in 1702 there was disagreement about his inheritance, but eventually, in 1732, Het Loo descended to Willem IV (1711–1751) who was, from 1747, Stadtholder of all the provinces. Both Willem IV and his son Willem V (1748–1806) used the palace in the 18th century as a summer residence.

== Demographics ==
As of 2020, Apeldoorn had a total population of 163,818 people.

=== Inhabitants by origin ===
2020	Numbers	%
Dutch natives	134,244	81.94%
Western migration background	13,737	8.38%
Non-Western migration background	15,837	9.66%
Indonesia	4,533	2.76%
Turkey	4,414	2.69%
Netherlands Antilles and Aruba	1,178	0.71%
Suriname	1,056	0.64%
Morocco	927	0.6%
Total	163,818	100%

== Geography ==
=== Climate ===
Apeldoorn experiences an oceanic climate (Köppen climate classification Cfb) similar to almost all of the Netherlands.

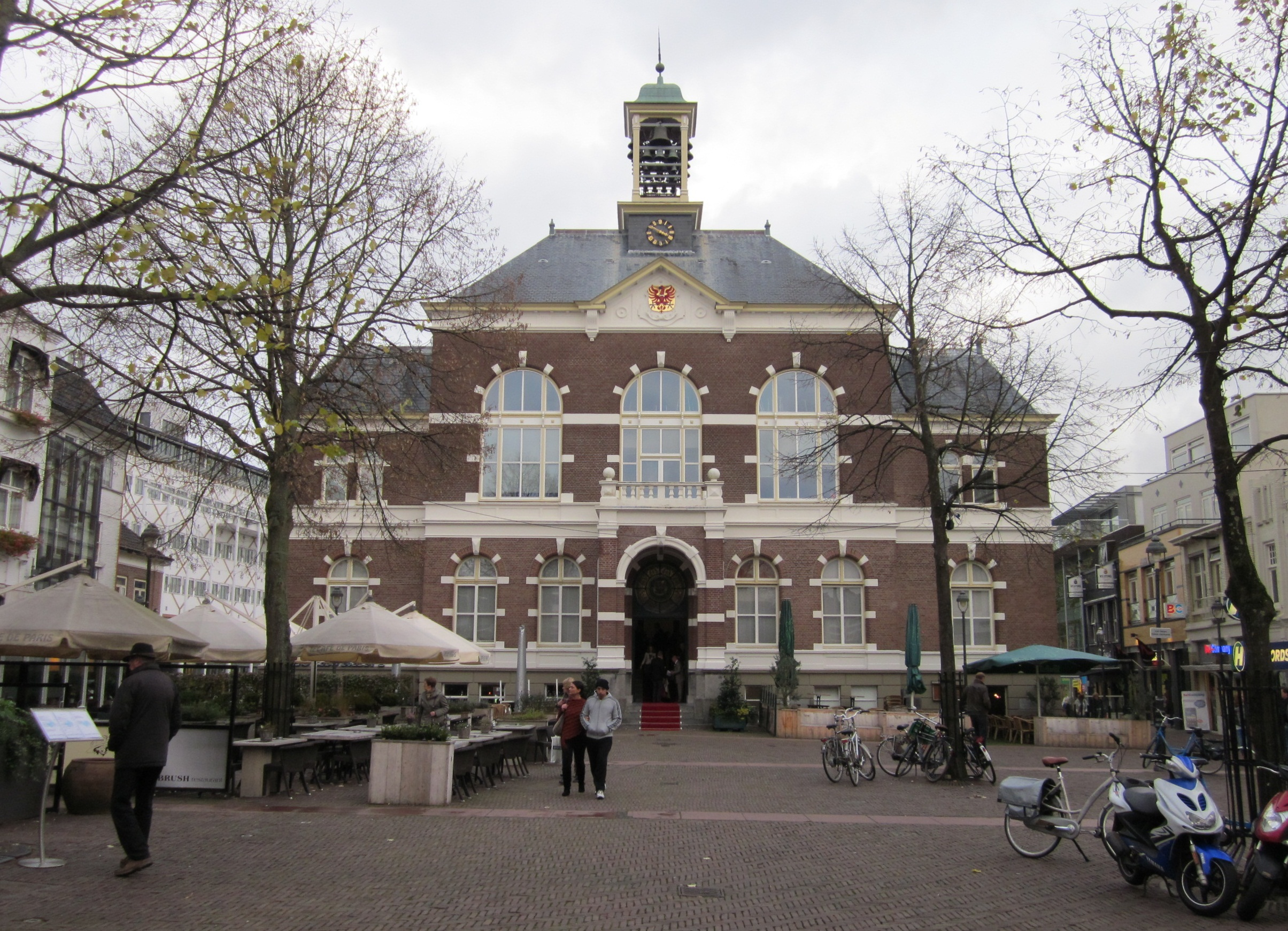
Former city hall in 2012

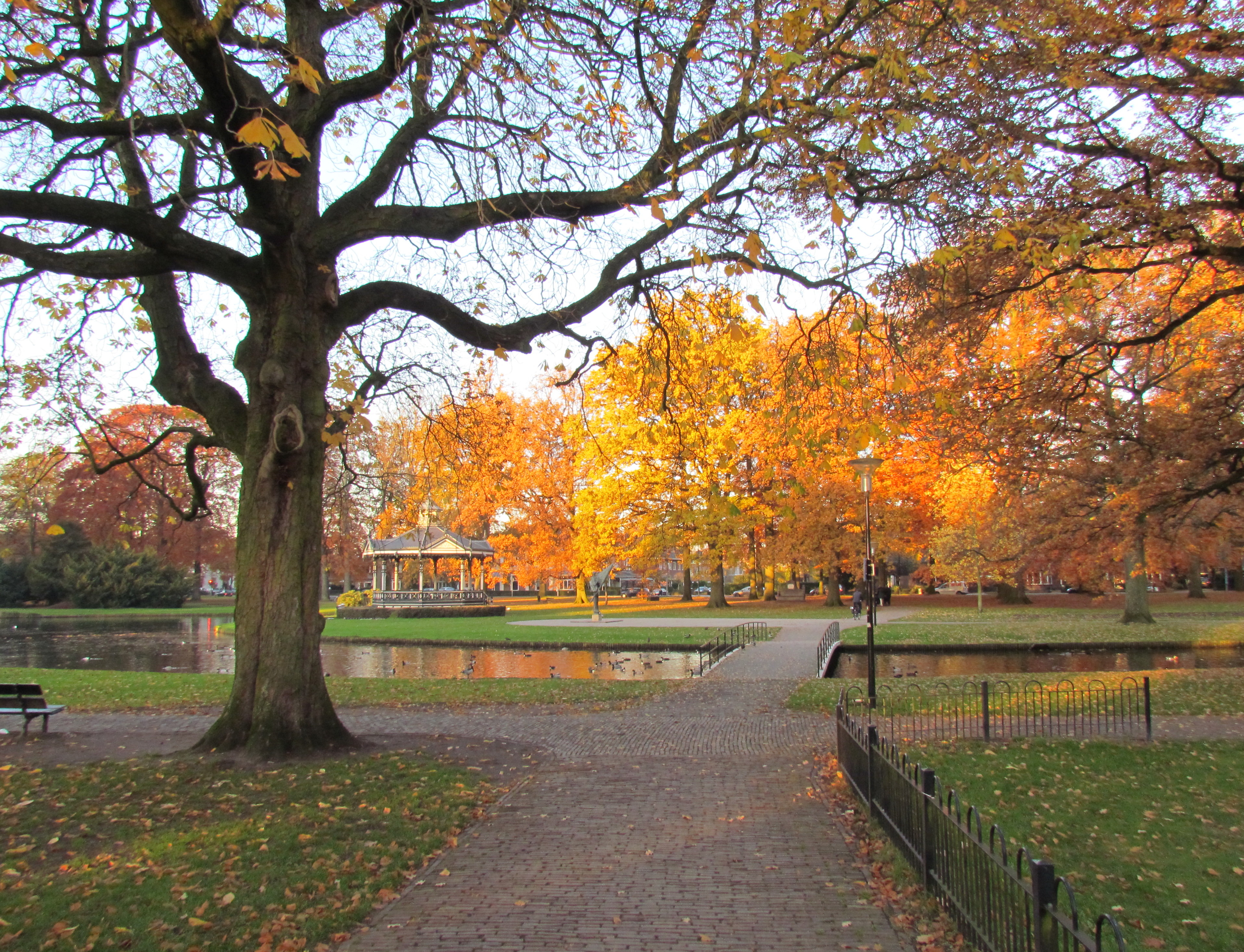
Oranjepark during fall

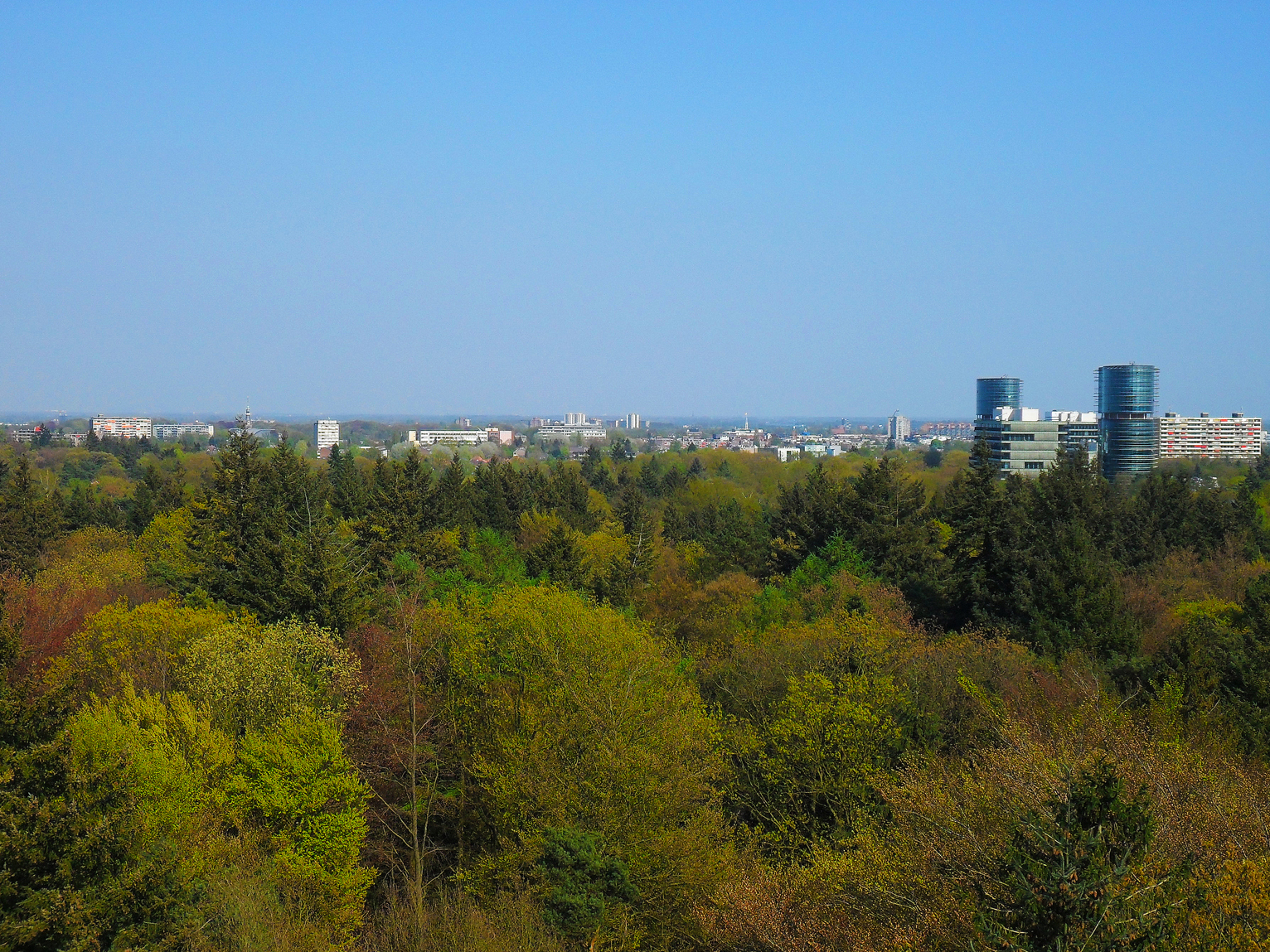
Apeldoorn seen from Berg en Bos park

=== Population centres ===
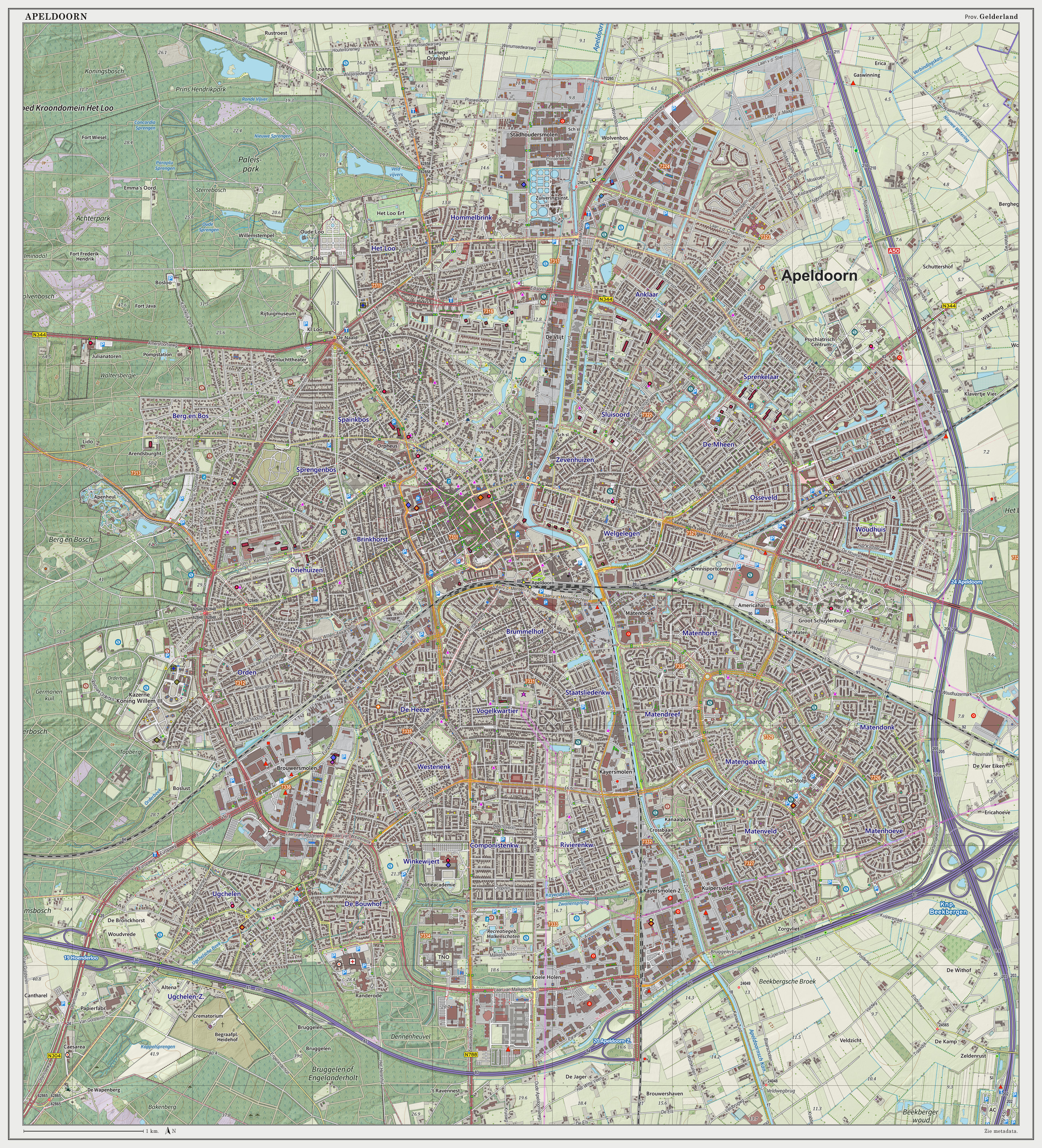
Topographic map image of Apeldoorn (town), September 2014

Very small hamlets are printed in italics.

- Apeldoorn (see below)
- Assel
- Beekbergen: a village 6 km south of Apeldoorn
- Beemte-Broekland, north of Apeldoorn
- Engeland, west of Beekbergen
- Gerritsflesch, nearby Radio Kootwijk
- Groenendaal, along the A50 motorway Apeldoorn - Arnhem
- Hoenderloo, 8 km south-west of Apeldoorn, situated next to the main road to Ede. Here is also an entrance to the Hoge Veluwe National Park
- Hoog Soeren, situated amidst the Veluwe forest
- Hooilanden
- Klarenbeek, east of Lieren, partially in the municipality of Voorst
- Lieren
- Loenen, this village, 5 km south-east of Beekbergen, has a castle ("Ter Horst"), a cardboard factory and an artificial "waterfall"
- Nieuw-Milligen, about 10 km in the direction of Amersfoort, consists of a Royal Netherlands Air and Space Force base, some camping sites and some scattered houses and farms
- Oosterhuizen
- Radio Kootwijk
- Uddel, a farmer's village 10 km north-west of Apeldoorn, where pigs and calves are raised; the majority of its population is known to belong to very orthodox Protestant Churches
- Ugchelen, formerly a village of its own, now an outer area of Apeldoorn, still having its own character
- Wenum-Wiesel, with an old water-mill; situated 5 km north of Apeldoorn. Is actually made up of two villages, Wenum and Wiesel.
- Woeste Hoeve, hamlet between Hoenderloo and Loenen.
- Woudhuizen, now at the eastern border of Apeldoorn. There is an outer area in Apeldoorn called "Woudhuis" and there is a small forest, called "Woudhuizer Bos"
- Zilven, the northern edge of Loenen

== Economy and infrastructure ==
=== Local businesses ===
- Centraal Beheer, a Dutch insurance company, known for their advertisement slogan Even Apeldoorn bellen (Just call Apeldoorn)
- Sparta B.V., a Dutch bicycle manufacturer based in Apeldoorn
- Royal Talens, now multinational manufacturer of painter's colours

=== Public transport ===
There are three railway stations in Apeldoorn, these are:

- Apeldoorn
- Apeldoorn De Maten
- Apeldoorn Osseveld

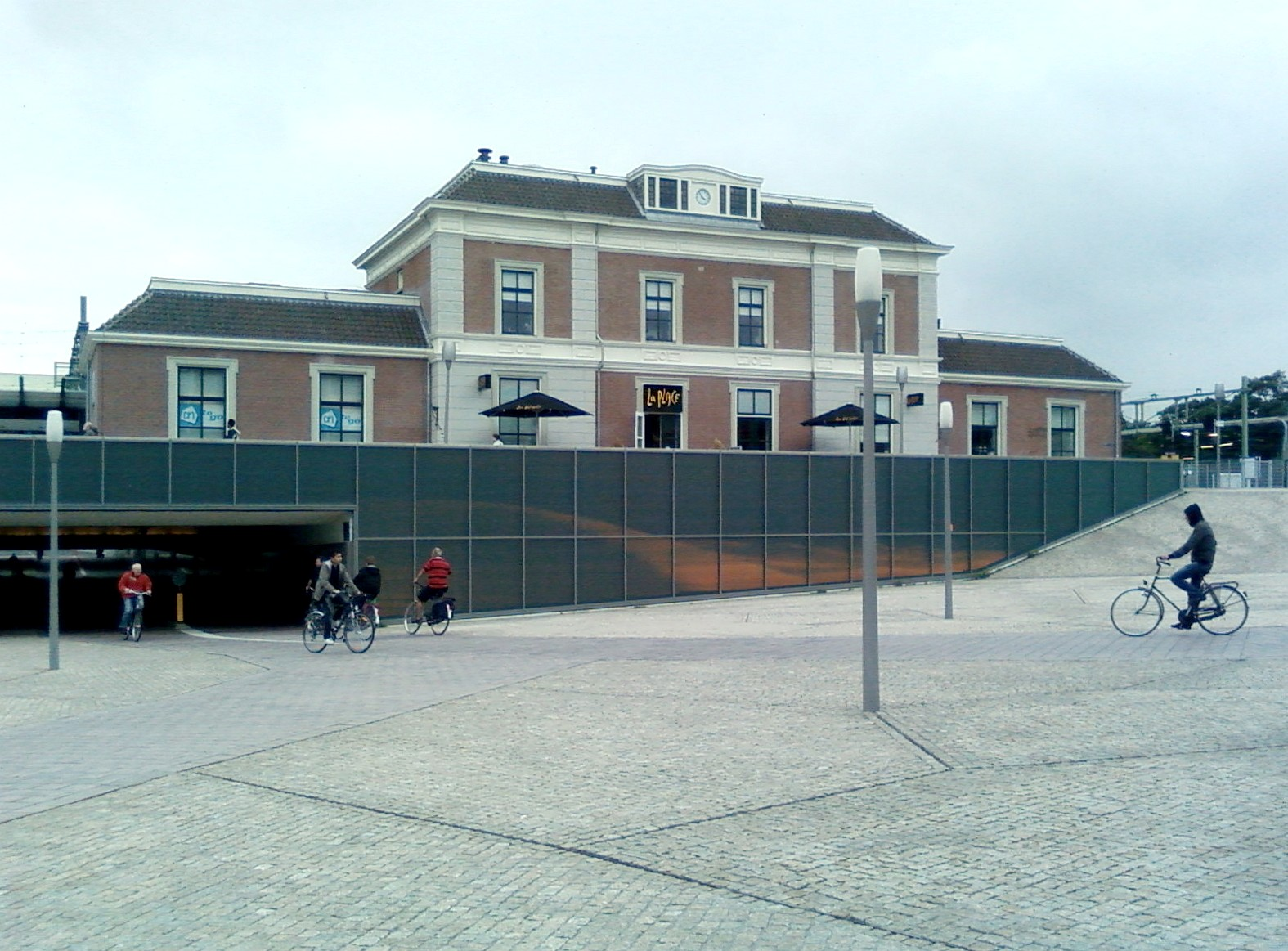
Central station Apeldoorn

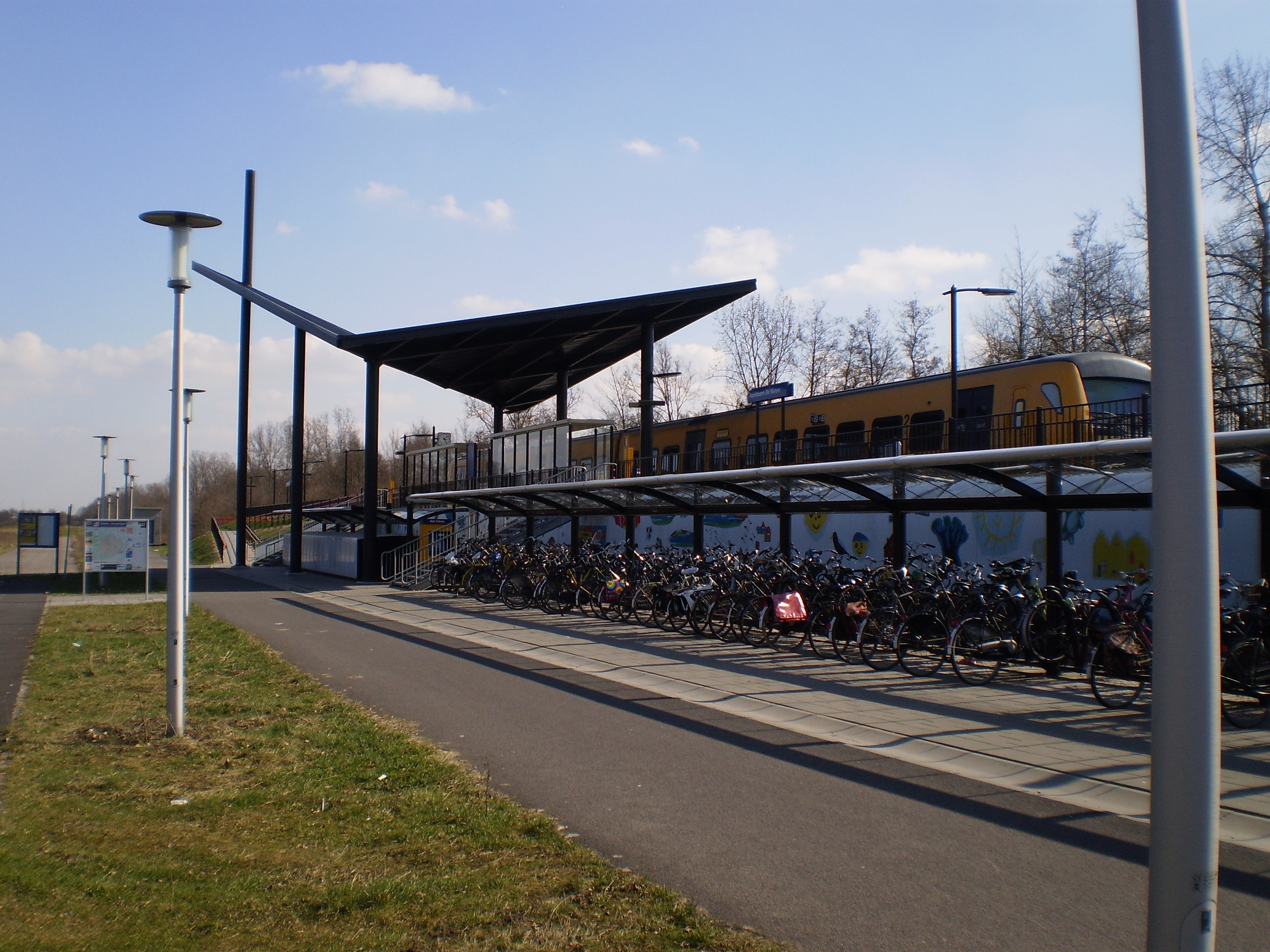
Station Apeldoorn De Maten

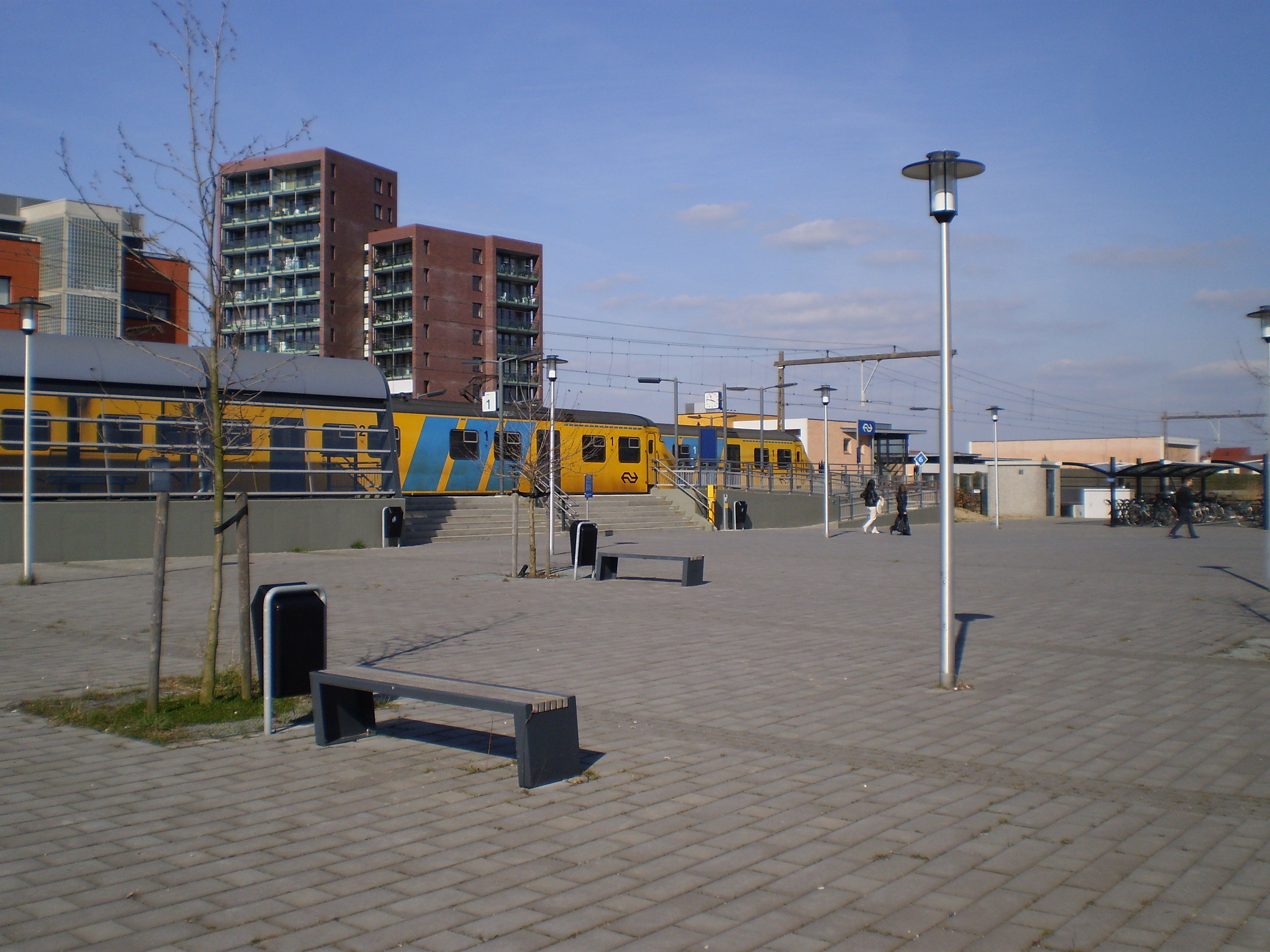
Station Apeldoorn Osseveld

The bus services in the city are provided by Keolis and has 18 lines.

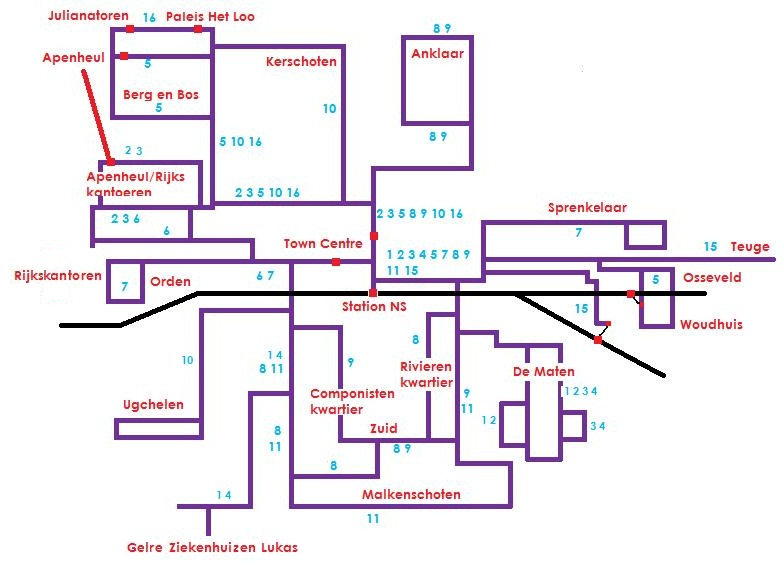
A Map Of The Stadbus Plus Network

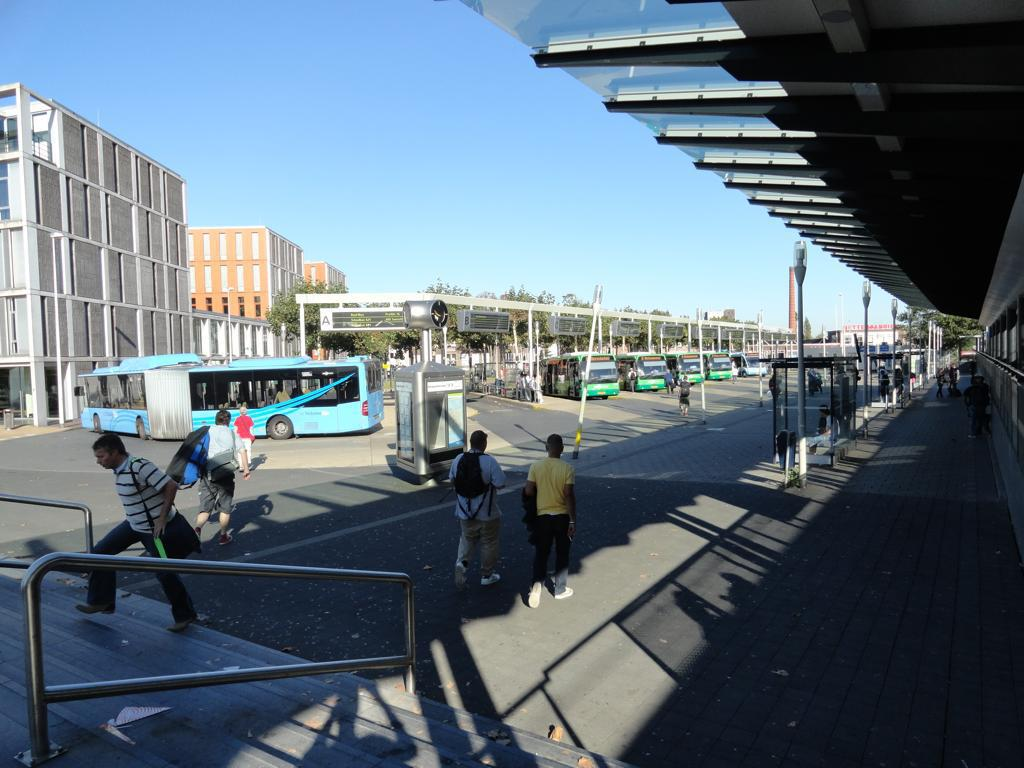
Apeldoorn Bus station

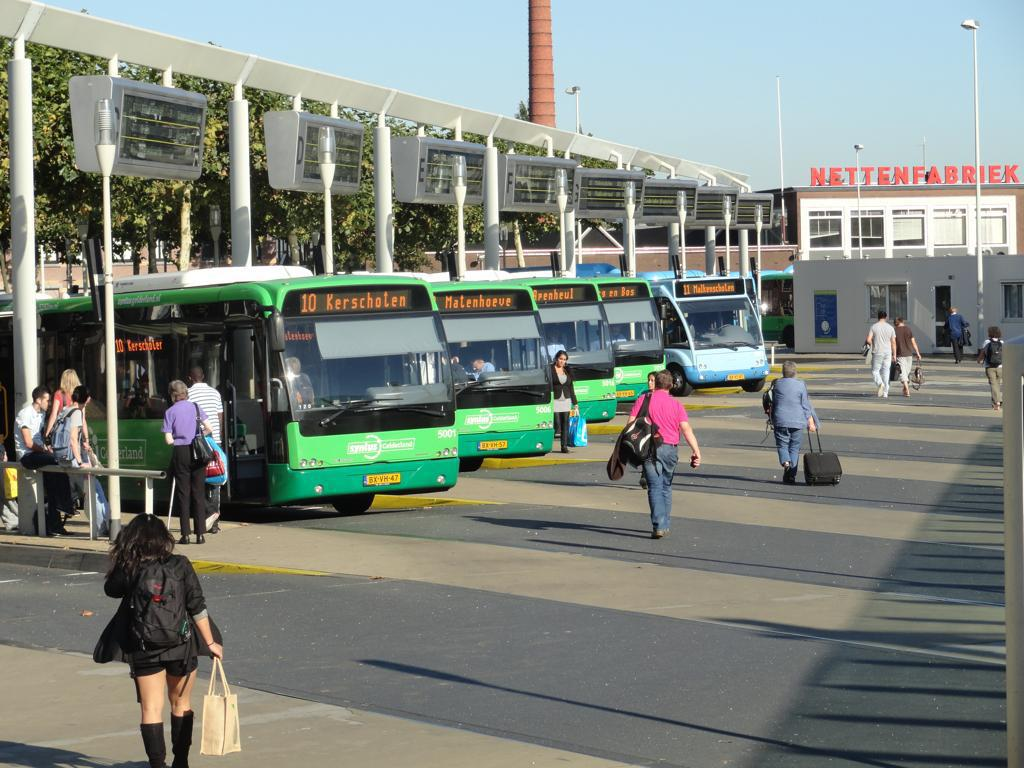
Apeldoorn Bus station

== Culture ==
=== Museums ===
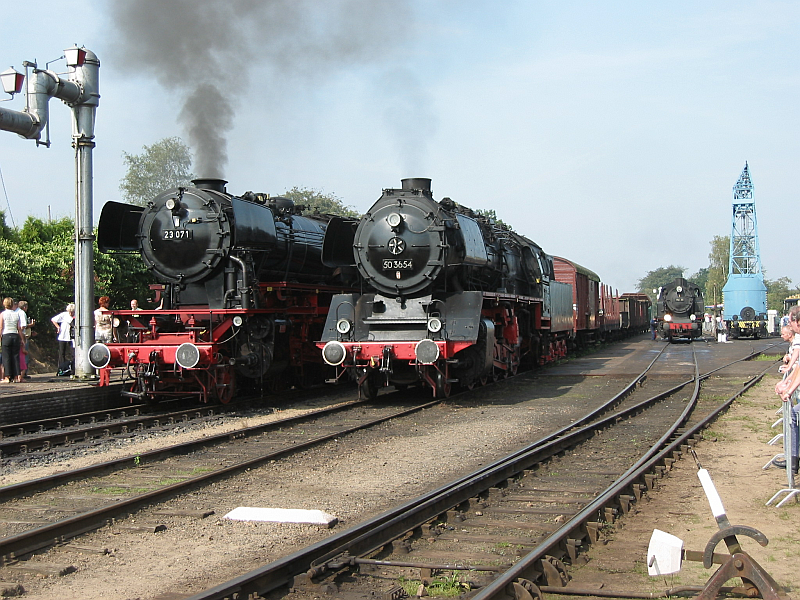
Two German locomotives of the VSM.

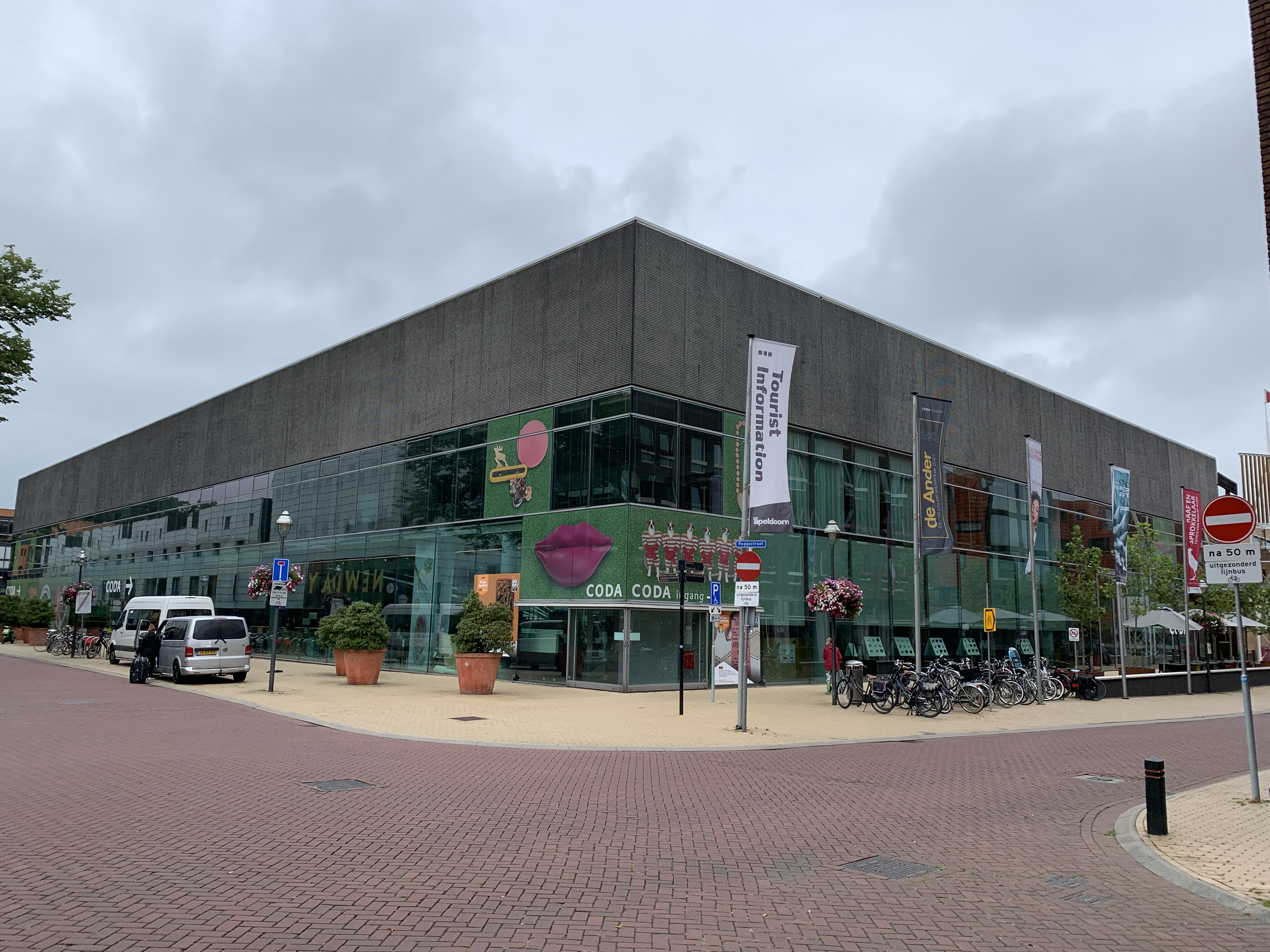
CODA museum

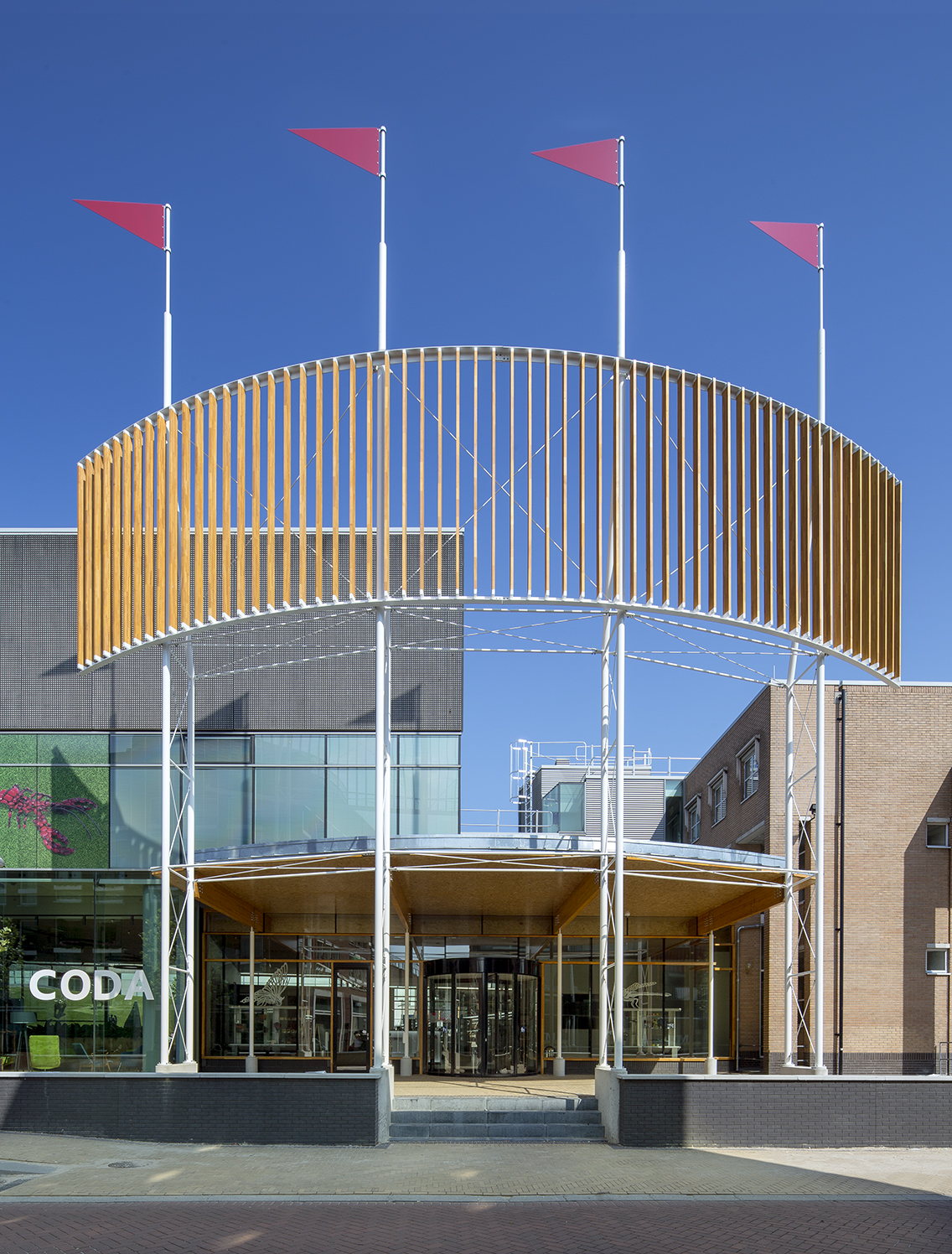
Entrance to the CODA museum.

- National Museum Het Loo Palace is a palace built by the House of Orange-Nassau
- CODA, Apeldoorn historical museum and central library
- Museum van de Kanselarij van de Nederlandse Ridderorden is a chancellery museum
- Veluwsche Stoomtrein Maatschappij (VSM) is a Dutch heritage railway
- Memorial Centre het Apeldoornsche Bosch commemorates the Jewish psychiatric institution where close to 1,300 patients and staff were deported to Auschwitz in the night of 21/22 January 1943. None of them returned.

=== Theater / cinema ===
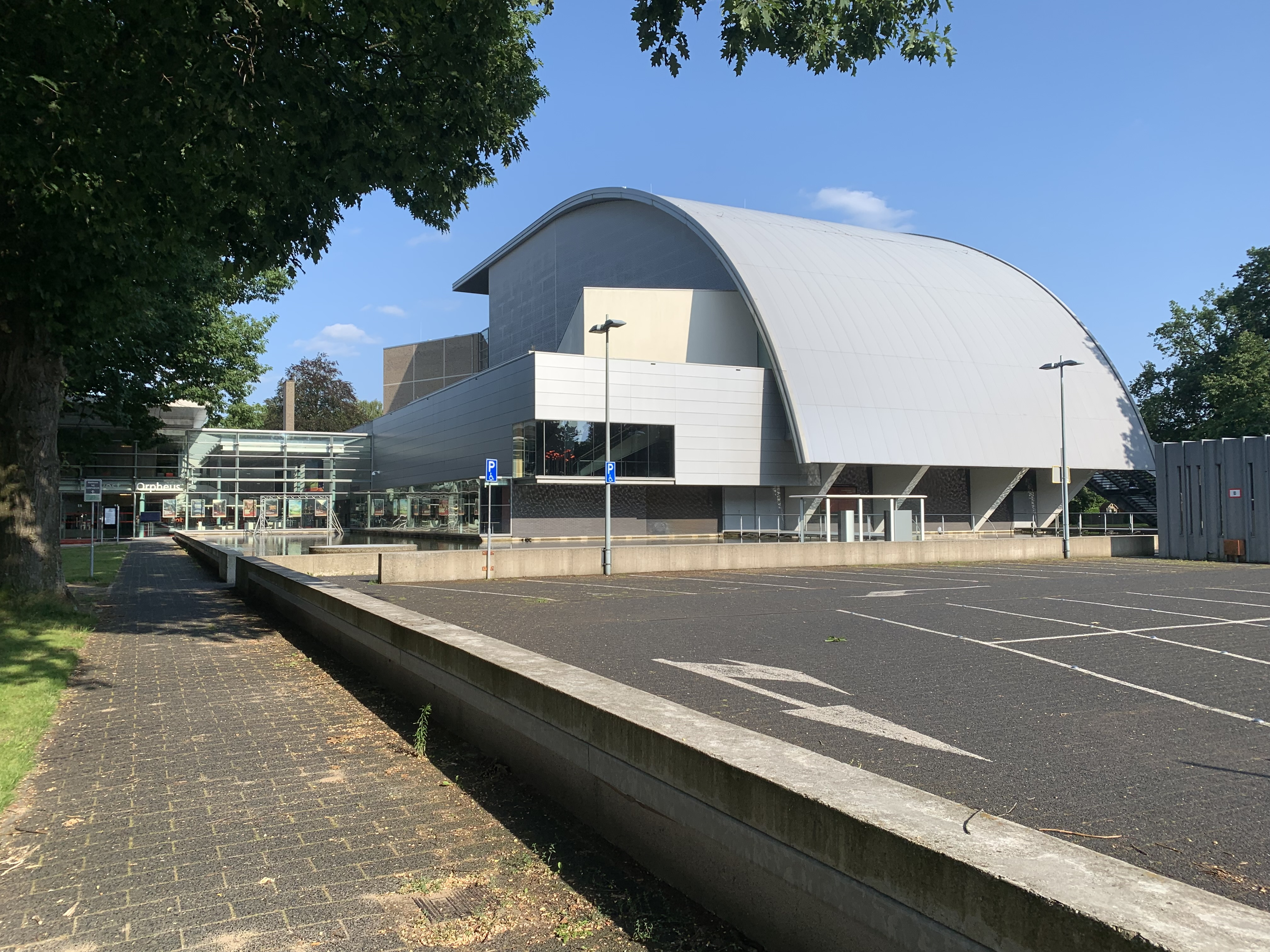
Theater Orpheus

- Theater Orpheus is among the five biggest theaters in the Netherlands
- Podium Gigant has a pop podium and cinema with three screens
- Vue cinema has seven screens

== Education ==
=== Schools ===
- Veluws College Walterbosch, Apeldoorn
- Koninklijke Hogere Burgerschool, Apeldoorn
- Institute of Martinus Herman van Doorn
- Veluws College Mheenpark

=== Universities ===
- Saxion University of Applied Sciences
- Theological University of Apeldoorn
- Wittenborg University of Applied Sciences

== Sport ==
Until early 2013, Apeldoorn housed the professional football club AGOVV Apeldoorn (Eerste Divisie), that played its matches in the Stadion Berg & Bos in the western part of Apeldoorn. However, AGOVV was forced to declare bankruptcy on 8 January 2013, because of an €400,000 tax debt. In 1958 the AGOVV stadium was used to promote Dutch Rugby Football, by staging a match between an English touring XV Thomas Cook's Rugby Club and RC Hilversum in front of 2,671 spectators. It was a 3-points draw. See film clip of first overseas tour to Holland 1958 The present rugby club, Rams RFC, was founded in December 1971.

The most successful club in Apeldoorn is the SV Dynamo volleyball team, who are the 15-fold champion in the Dutch A-League, most recently in 2023. Another successful volleyball club in Apeldoorn, and a big competitor to Dynamo, is Alterno.

Because of the growth of Apeldoorn, and the population's interest in sports, Apeldoorn has built a new stadium for volleyball, indoor athletics and track cycling. The stadium, Omnisport Apeldoorn, opened in 2008 and has hosted the 2011 UCI Track Cycling World Championships and the European Track Championships in 2011 and 2013. In 2016 the city hosted the opening time-trial stage of the Giro d'Italia.

Apeldoorn houses the following football clubs:

- AGOVV
- Alexandria
- Apeldoornse Boys
- Columbia
- CSV Apeldoorn
- Groen−Wit '62
- Orderbos
- Robur et Velocitas
- Turkse Kracht Apeldoorn
- Victoria Boys
- WSV
- ZVV '56

== Notable people ==
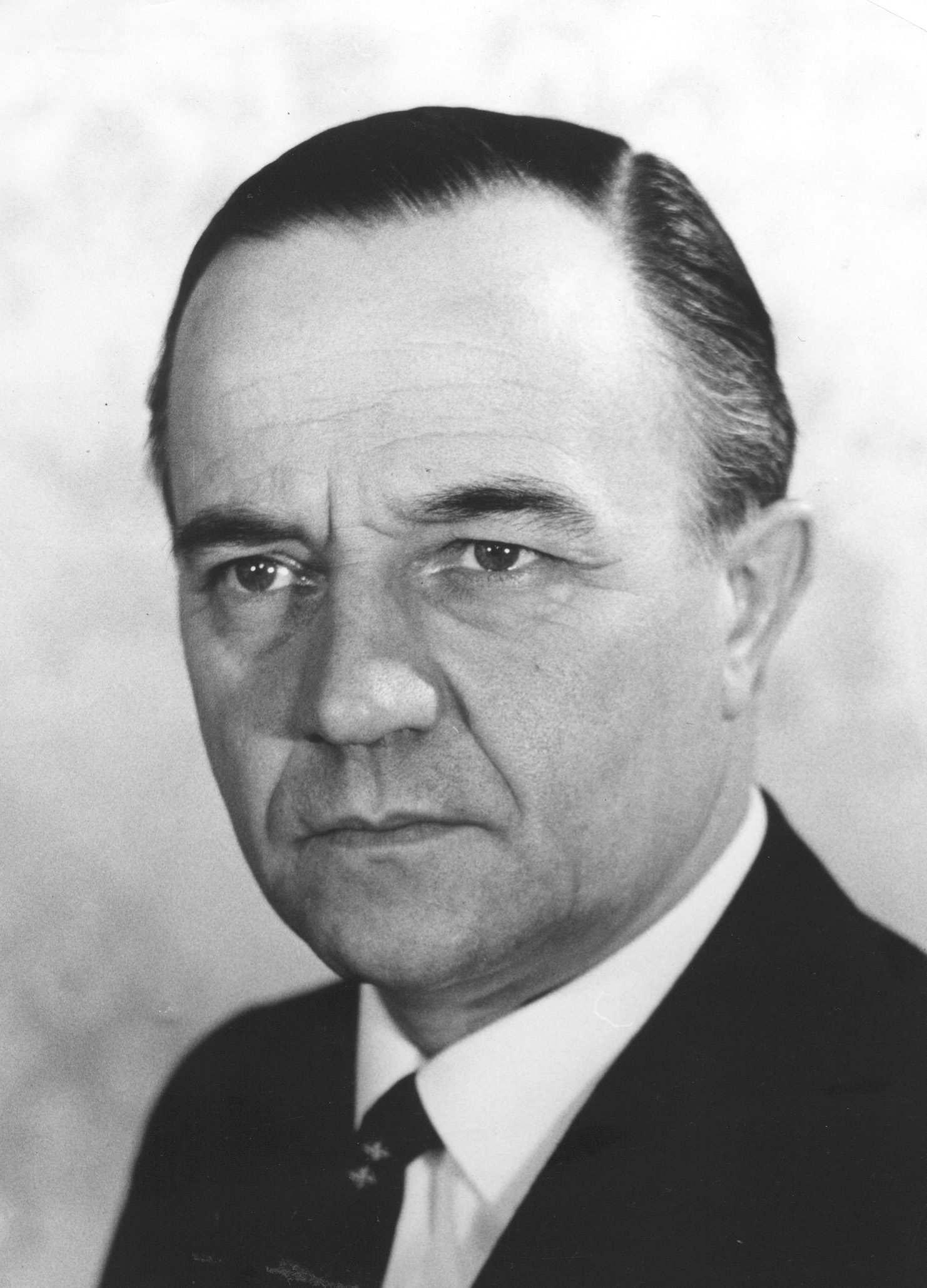
Piet de Jong, 1970

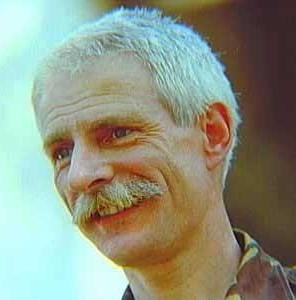
Thom Karremans, 1995

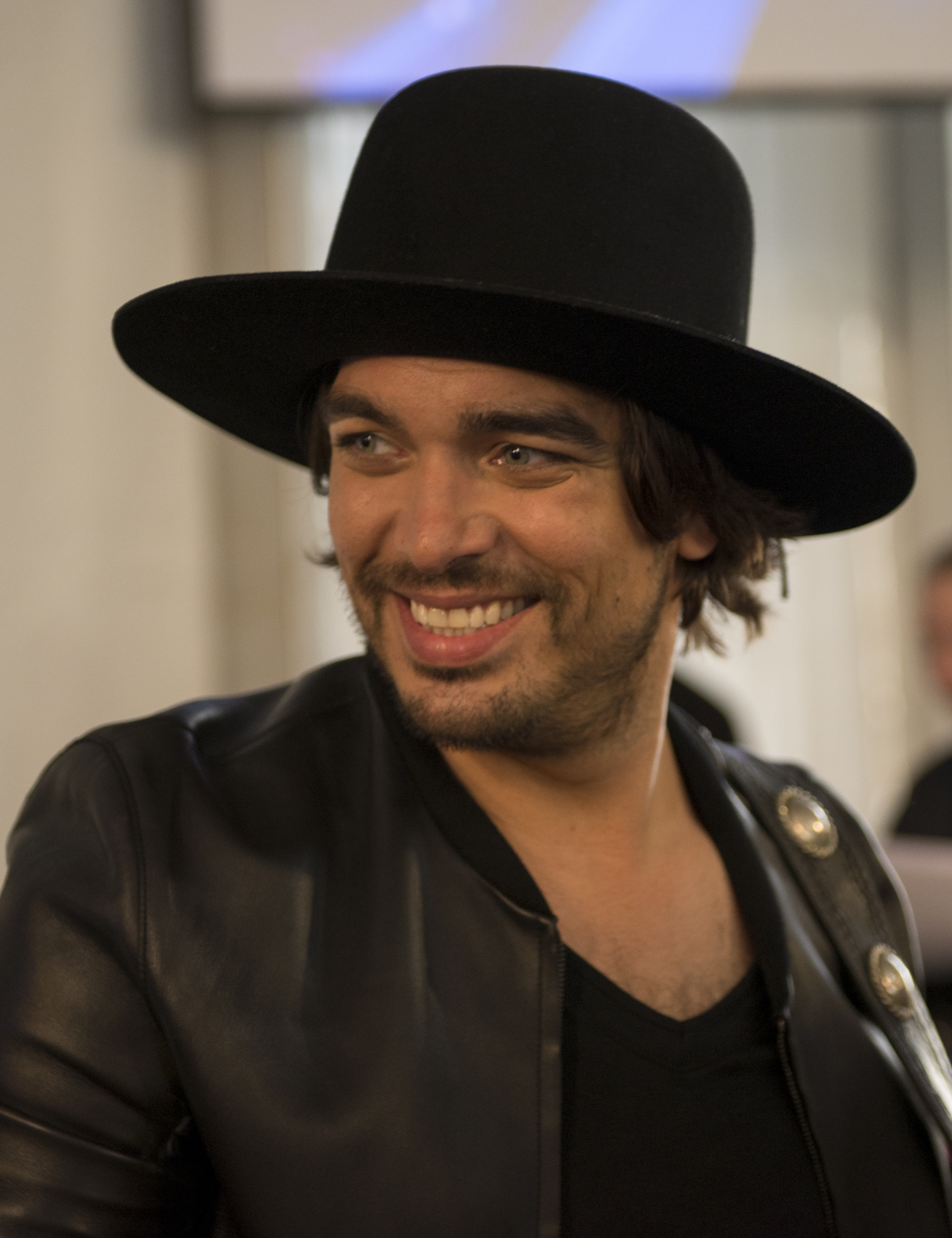
Waylon, 2014

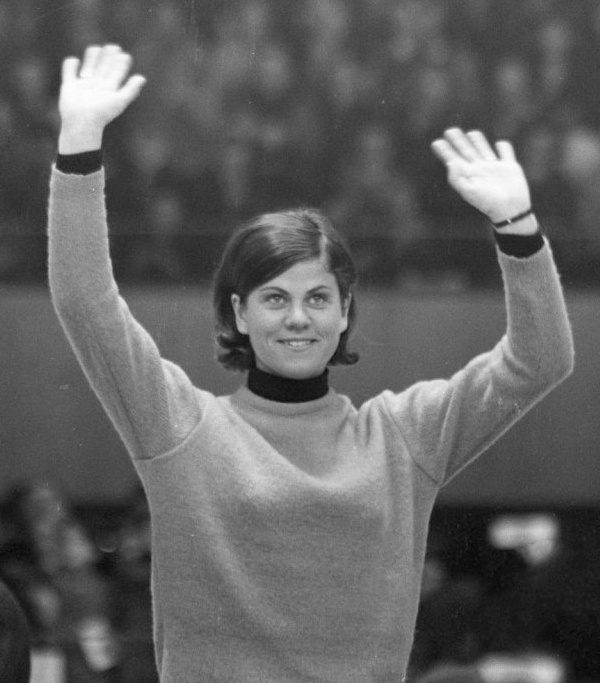
Ans Schut, 1968

=== Public servants ===
- Piet de Jong (1915–2016) a politician and Prime Minister of the Netherlands 1967/1971
- Willem van Zeist (1924–2016) an archaeobotanist and palynologist
- Arend Lijphart (born 1936) a political scientist
- Pieter van Vollenhoven Jr. (born 1939) the husband of Princess Margriet of the Netherlands
- Hanja Maij-Weggen (born 1943) a retired politician
- Jacques Wallage (born 1946) a retired politician
- Colonel Thom Karremans (born 1948) the commander of Dutchbat troops in Srebrenica
- Fred de Graaf (born 1950) a retired politician, Mayor of Apeldoorn 1999/2011
- Mart de Kruif (born 1958) a three-star general in the Royal Netherlands Army and its executive commander.
- Marit Maij (born 1972) a politician, former management consultant, diplomat and civil servant

=== Arts ===
- Patrick Bakker (1910–1932) an artist in oil paintings, pen and pastel drawings
- Berend Hendriks (1918–1997) an artist, co-founded the Arnhem school of environmental art
- Edgar Burcksen (1947–2024) a film editor
- Jeroen Jongeleen (born 1967) an artist
- Willem Bijkerk (born 1980), known professionally as Waylon, a singer
- Julian Jordan (born 1995) a DJ, record producer and musician

=== Sport ===
- Nico de Wolf (1887–1967) a amateur footballer, bronze medallist in the 1912 Summer Olympics
- Ans Schut (1944–2025) a ice speed skater, gold medallist at the 1968 Winter Olympics
- Edward Sturing (born 1963) a former footballer with 452 caps
- Peter Bosz (born 1963) a former footballer, current manager of PSV Eindhoven
- Mark Schenning (born 1970) a former professional footballer with 436 caps
- Corine Dorland (born 1973) a amateur BMX racer from 1981 to 1996
- Demy de Zeeuw (born 1983) a retired footballer with 306 caps
- Steven Berghuis (born 1991) a professional footballer
- Kevin Diks (born 1996) a Dutch-born Indonesian professional footballer

=== Business ===
- Marc Bolland (born 1959) a businessman, who was the CEO of Marks & Spencer and CEO of Morrisons

== 2009 car attack ==
On 30 April 2009, the Dutch national holiday Koninginnedag (Queen's Day), a man drove his car at high speed into a parade which included Queen Beatrix and other members of the royal family.

The driver hit members of the public lining the street leaving twenty-two injured and eight dead, including the driver himself, who died the following day. Although the royal family was unharmed, it is believed to be the first attack on the Dutch royal family in modern times.

== Twin towns – sister cities ==
Apeldoorn is twinned with:

- Burlington, Ontario, Canada
- Charlottenburg-Wilmersdorf (Berlin), Germany
- Gagny, France
