= Lieren =

- Village
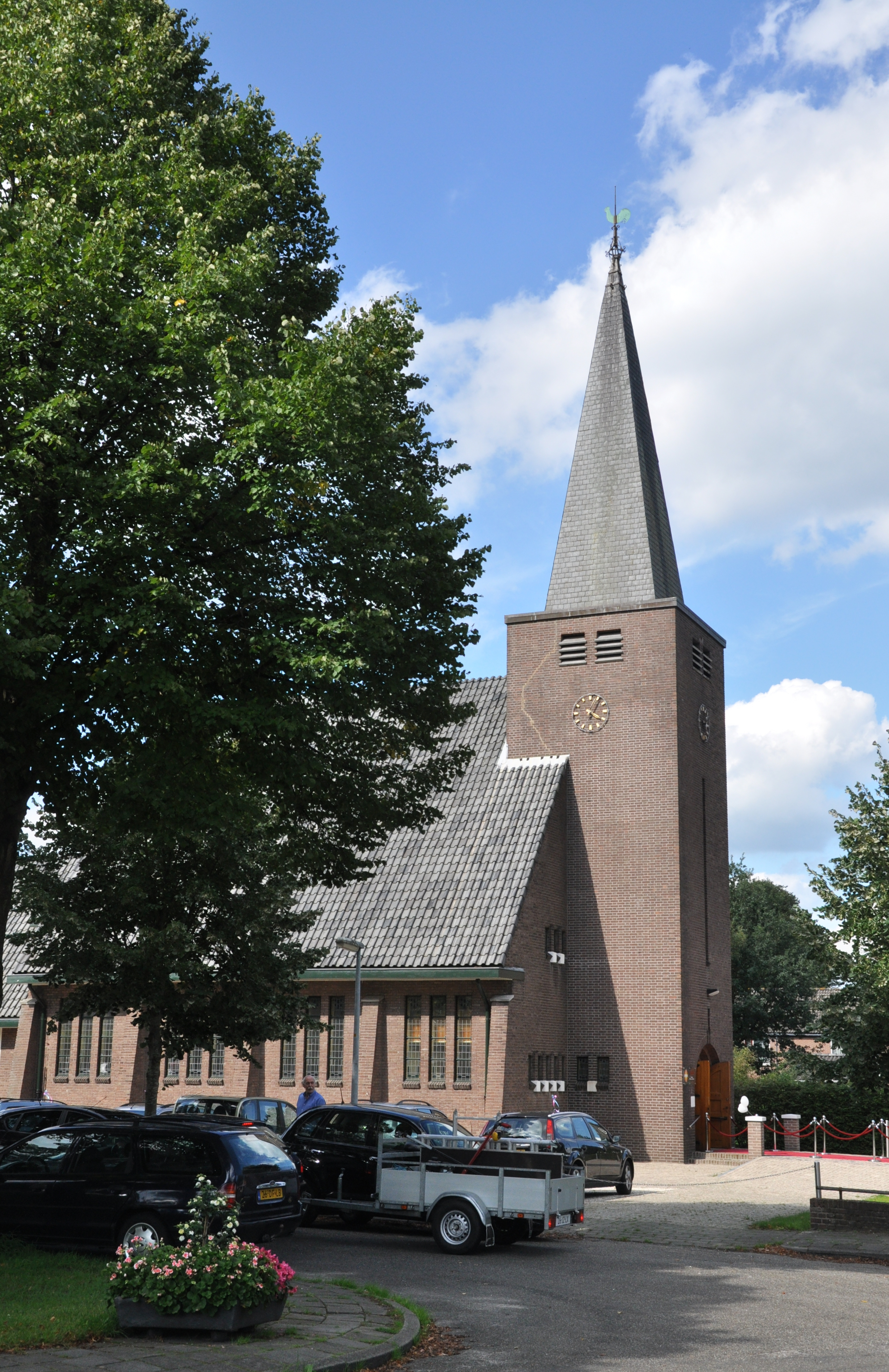
- The church in Lieren

- Location of Lieren in the municipality of Apeldoorn (the urban area of Beekbergen is red and the rural area is pink)

- Location of Lieren in Gelderland Lieren (Netherlands)
- Coordinates: 52°9′44″N 5°59′20″E
- Country: Netherlands
- Province: Gelderland
- Municipality: Apeldoorn

Area
  - Total: 3.75 km^{2} (1.45 sq mi)
- Elevation: 15 m (49 ft)

Population (2021)
  - Total: 1,130
  - Density: 301/km^{2} (780/sq mi)
- Time zone: UTC+1 (CET)
  - Summer (DST): UTC+2 (CEST)
- Postal code: 7364
- Dialing code: 055

Lieren is a village in the Netherlands and part of the municipality of Apeldoorn. It is situated about 8 km ( 5 miles) south-east of the city centre of Apeldoorn and 2 km east of Beekbergen.

Despite its size, Lieren has a primary school, a bakery and a few DIY-stores. Most of its income come from tourism, with the Veluwe close at hand and multiple camping sites nearby. Also, a steam-train station belonging to the VSM attracts many tourists.

Once in every 3 years, the Uutbuurt takes place in Lieren. This is an event at which almost the whole village is present. At this event local bands and artists perform.

== Gallery ==
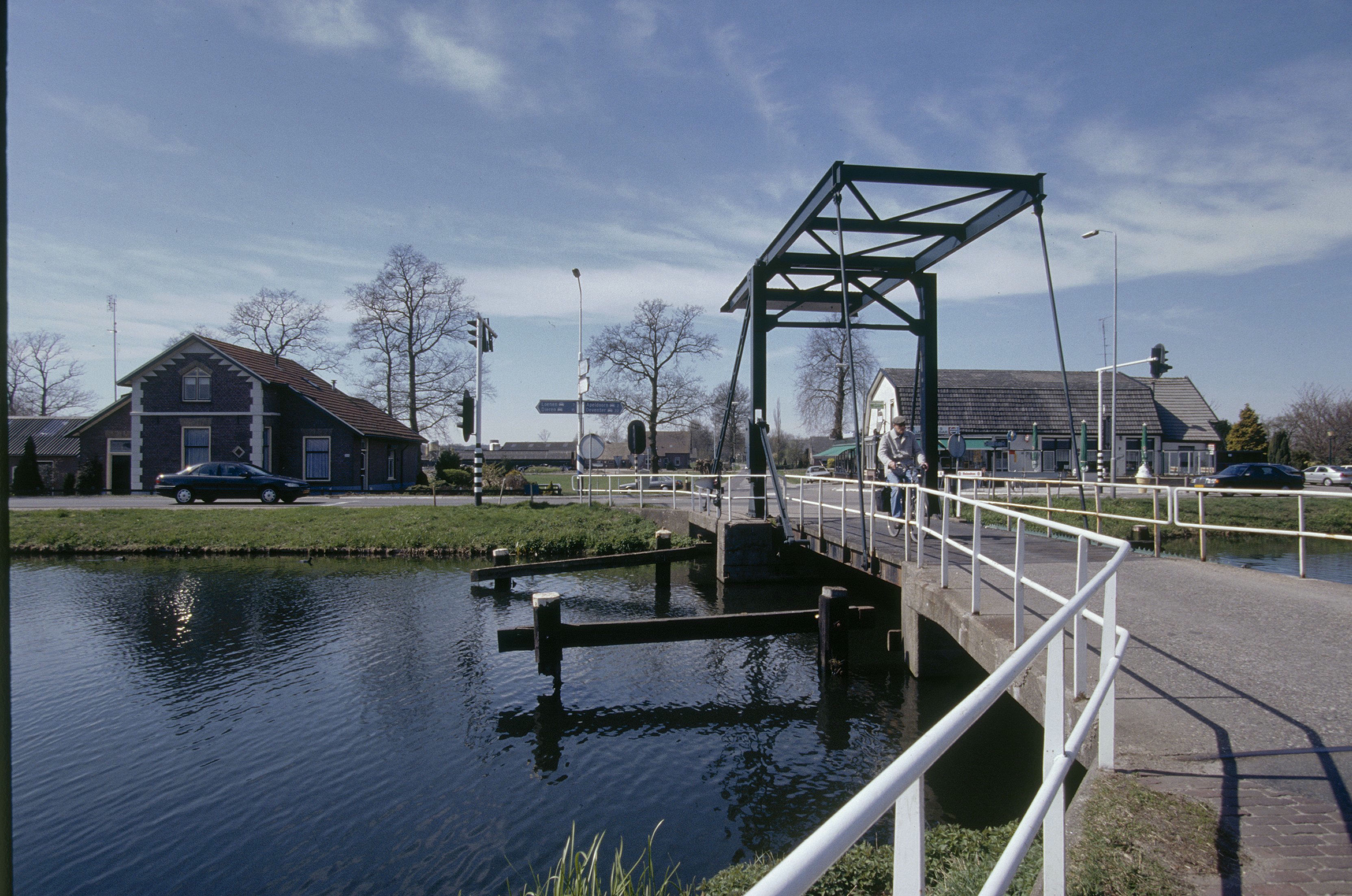
Draw bridge

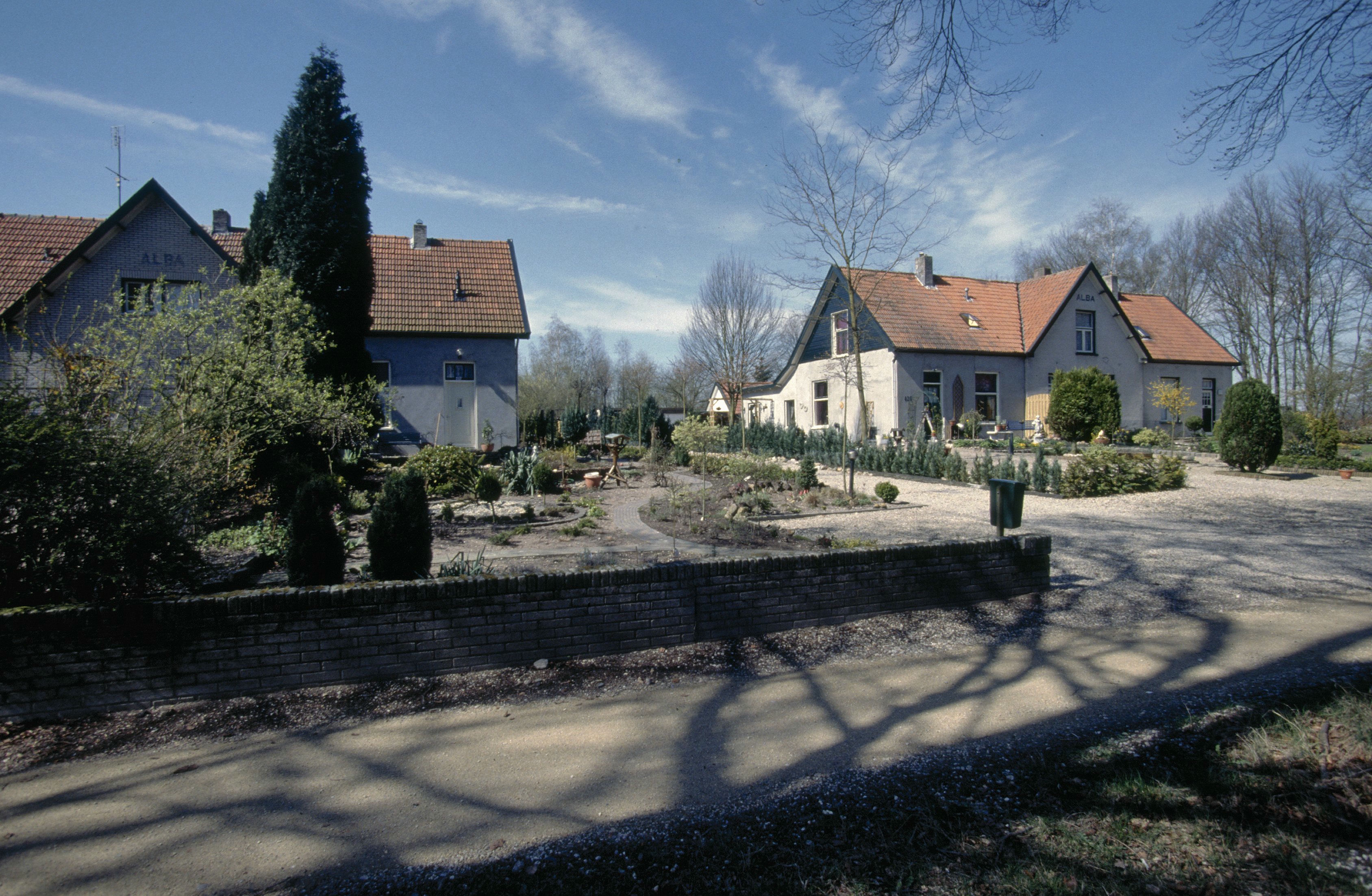
Houses in Lieren

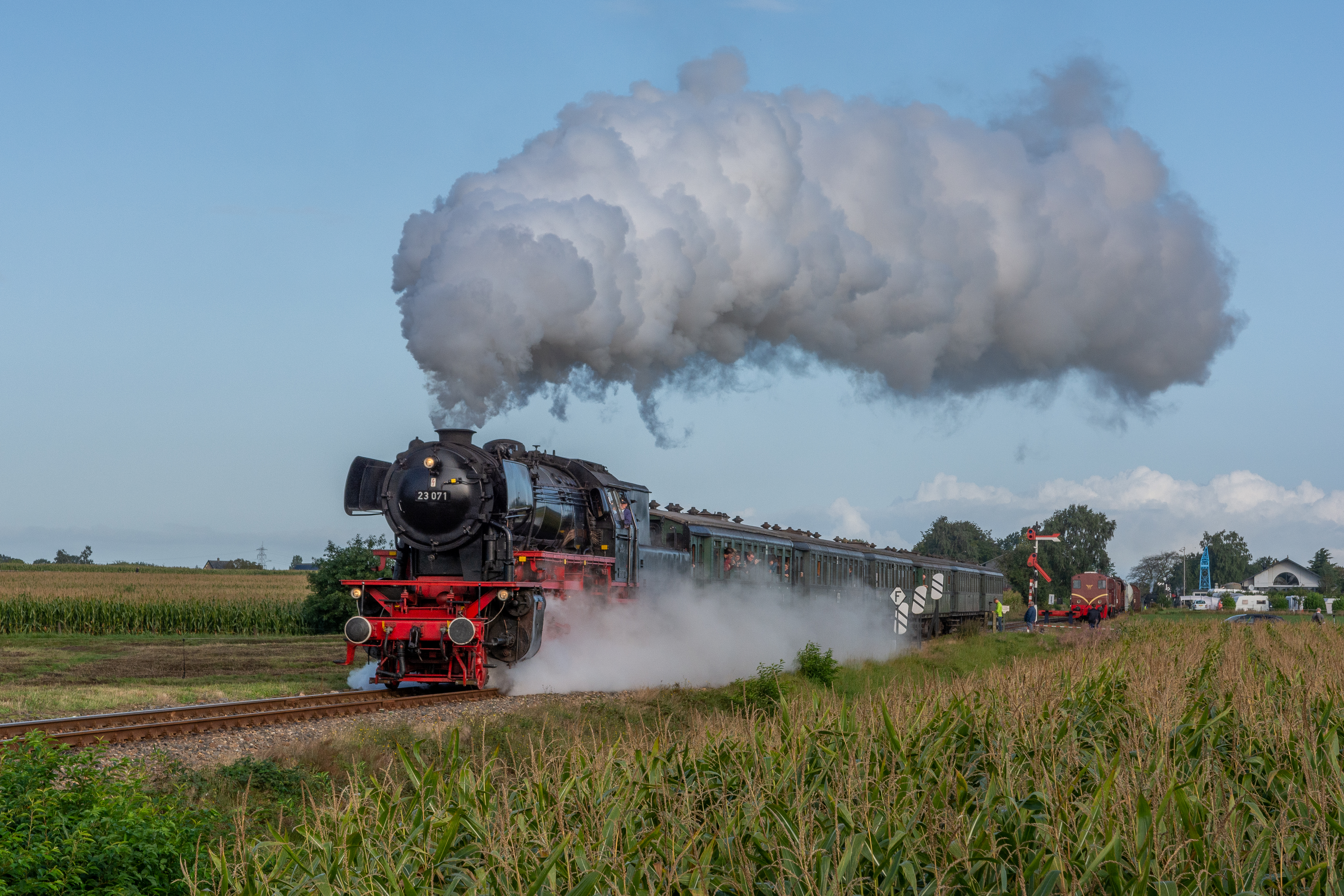
Steam train

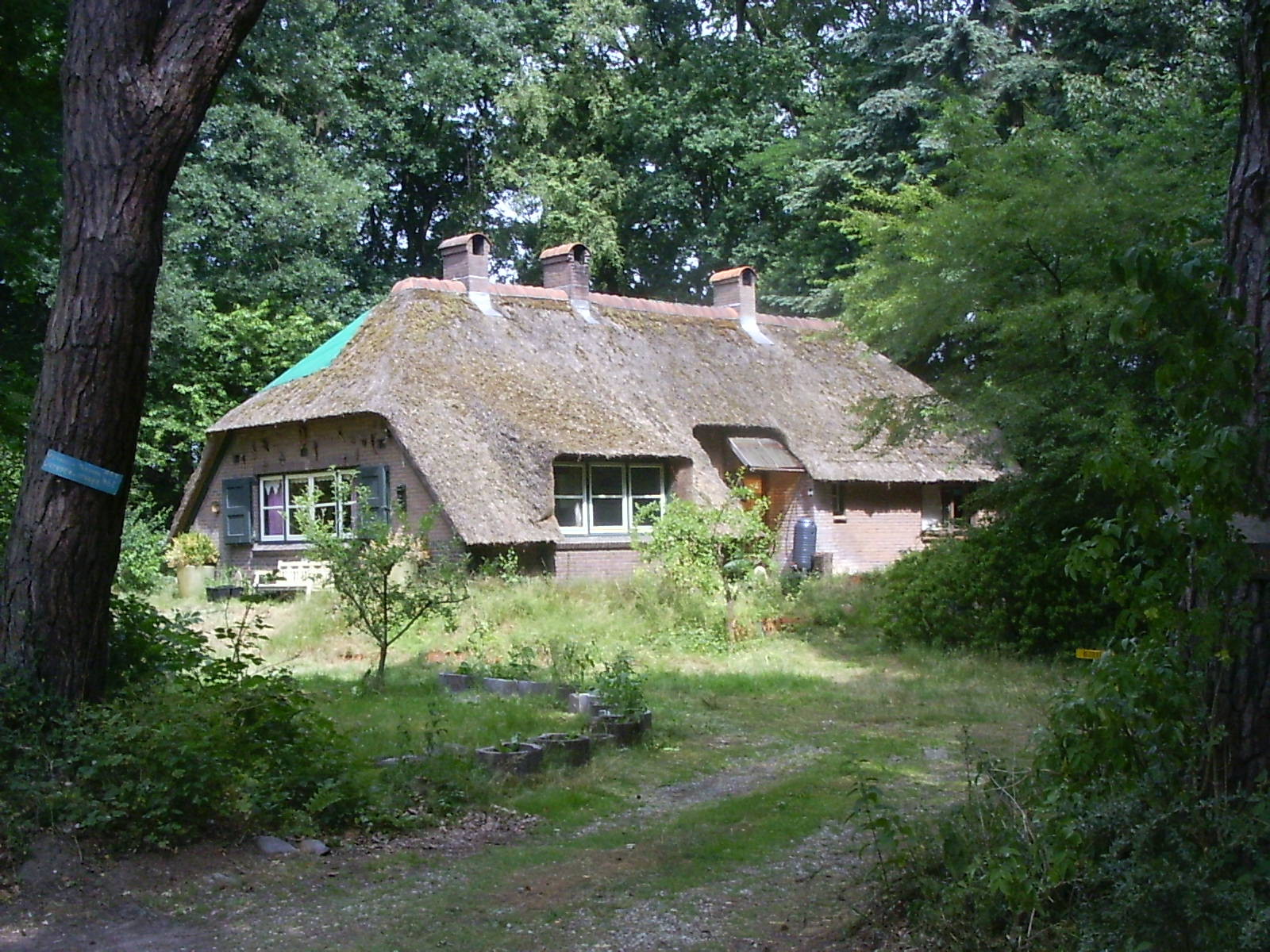
Farm in the forest
