= Class 65 =

Class 65 may refer to:

- German steam locomotives built after the Second World War for passenger duties by the railway administrations in both West and East Germany, the Deutsche Bundesbahn and Deutsche Reichsbahn (GDR) respectively. These two modern designs or Neubaulokomotiven were the:
  - DB Class 65 – a class of West German 2-8-4T locomotives
  - DR Class 65.10 – a class of East German 2-8-4T locomotives
