= Class 83 =

Class 83 may refer to:

- British Rail Class 83 – a class of electric locomotives
- DR Class 83.10 – a class of East German 2-8-4T steam locomotives
- KTM Class 83 – a class of Malaysian electric multiple units
