= Class 66 =

Class 66 may refer to:

- British Rail Class 66, a type of EMD freight locomotive
- EMD Class 66, an adaptation of the above locomotive
- DB Class 66, a Deutsche Bundesbahn 2-6-4T steam locomotive
- NSB Class 66, an electric multiple unit train used by the Norwegian State Railways

== See also ==
- German Type U 66 submarine, or U-66-class
