= DR Class 83.10 =

Type and origin
- Power type: Steam
- Builder: Lokomotivbau Karl Marx Babelsberg
- Build date: 1955–1956
- Total produced: 27
Specifications
- Configuration
  - Whyte: 2-8-4T
  - UIC: 1′D2′ h2t
  - German: Gt 47.15
- Gauge: 1,435 mm (4 ft 8 1/2 in)
- Leading dia.: 850 mm (2 ft 9 1/2 in)
- Driver dia.: 1,250 mm (4 ft 1 1/4 in)
- Trailing dia.: 850 mm (2 ft 9 1/2 in)
- Wheelbase
  - Axle spacing (Asymmetrical): 2,600 mm (8 ft 6 3/8 in) +; 1,500 mm (4 ft 11 1/16 in) +; 1,500 mm (4 ft 11 1/16 in) +; 1,500 mm (4 ft 11 1/16 in) +; 2,200 mm (7 ft 2 5/8 in) +; 1,800 mm (5 ft 10 7/8 in) =
  - Engine: 11,100 mm (36 ft 5 in)
- Length
  - Over headstocks: 13,800 mm (45 ft 3 1/4 in)
  - Over buffers: 15,100 mm (49 ft 6 1/2 in)
- Height: 4,250 mm (13 ft 11 5/16 in)
- Axle load: 14.9 t (14.7 long tons; 16.4 short tons)
- Adhesive weight: 59.5 t (58.6 long tons; 65.6 short tons)
- Empty weight: 70.9 t (69.8 long tons; 78.2 short tons)
- Service weight: 99.7 t (98.1 long tons; 109.9 short tons)
- Fuel type: Coal
- Fuel capacity: 8.0 t (7.9 long tons; 8.8 short tons)
- Water cap.: 14 m^{3} (3,080 imp gal; 3,700 US gal)
- Firebox
  - Grate area: 2.50 m^{2} (26.9 sq ft)
- Boiler
  - Pitch: 2,900 mm (9 ft 6 1/8 in)
  - Tube plates: 3,800 mm (12 ft 5 5/8 in)
  - Small tubes: 44.5 mm (1 3/4 in), 124 off
  - Large tubes: 133 mm (5 1/4 in), 24 off
- Boiler pressure: 14 bar (14.3 kgf/cm^{2}; 203 psi)
- Heating surface
  - Firebox: 12.16 m^{2} (130.9 sq ft)
  - Tubes: 58.35 m^{2} (628.1 sq ft)
  - Flues: 35.65 m^{2} (383.7 sq ft)
  - Total surface: 106.16 m^{2} (1,142.7 sq ft)
- Superheater
  - Heating area: 39.25 m^{2} (422.5 sq ft)
- Cylinders: Two, outside
- Cylinder size: 500 mm × 660 mm (19 11/16 in × 26 in)
Performance figures
- Maximum speed: 60 km/h (37 mph) both directions
- Indicated power: 1,080 PS (794 kW; 1,070 hp)
Career
- Operators: Deutsche Reichsbahn (GDR)
- Numbers: 83 1001 – 82 1027
- Retired: 1972

The DR Class 83.10 was a newly designed (Neubaulok) steam locomotive built for the Deutsche Reichsbahn in East Germany after the Second World War and was introduced into service in 1955 and 1956.

The 83.10 was intended for duties on branch lines where a top speed of 60 km/h and a driving wheel diameter of 1,250 mm was sufficient. The carrying wheels and first coupled wheels worked together in a Krauss-Helmholtz bogie. The design of the Class 83.10 was based on the DR Class 65.10. The engines were fitted with superheated steam regulators, mixer-preheaters, distributed sandboxes and plate frames. They could haul a train load of up to 1,000 tonnes at 60 km/h on the level.

After the delivery of the first locomotive in 1955 the engine was fully tested at the VES-M Halle trials depot. The various tests showed numerous shortcomings, that could not all be resolved on the production models. Several problems were able to be rectified in the course of subsequent modifications. The locomotive was never really convincing and, in the light of the looming changeover to diesel operations, only 27 examples were eventually built. It remains therefore relatively unknown. One area of operations was the Arnstadt–Saalfeld line.

In 1972 the last two machines, numbers 83 1025 and 83 1027 were retired. No examples of this class have been preserved.

== See also ==
- List of East German Deutsche Reichsbahn locomotives and railbuses
- Neubaulok
