= Augsburg Railway Park =

Railway museum in Augsburg, Germany

- Bahnpark Augsburg
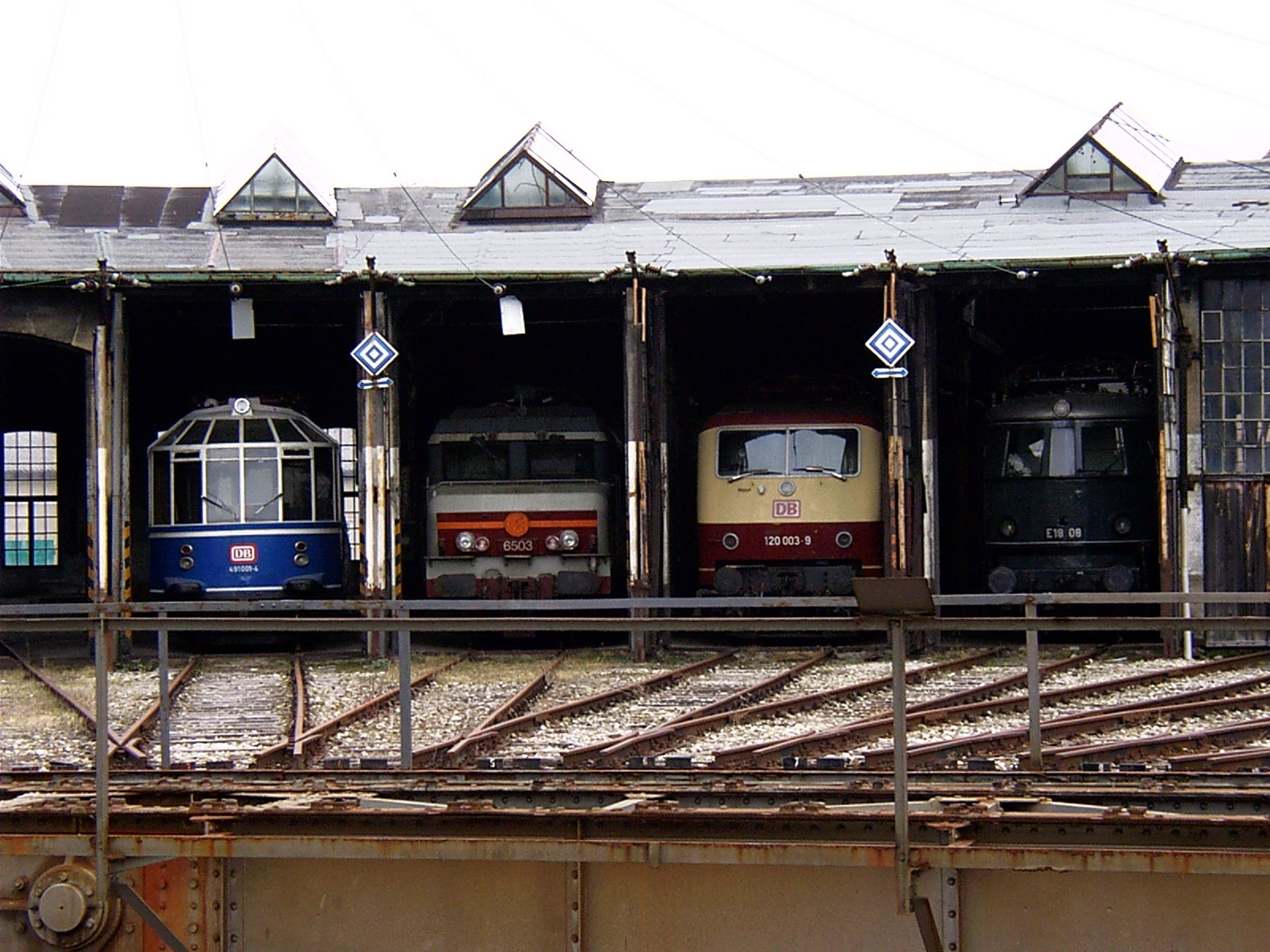
- Parade of locomotives in the Europa Roundhouse
- Coordinates: 48°20′53.8″N 10°53′38.6″E
- Website: www.bahnpark-augsburg.de

The Augsburg Railway Park (Bahnpark Augsburg) is a railway museum in Augsburg on part of the former Augsburg locomotive shed owned by the Deutsche Bahn. Following reconstruction work, the park officially reopened on 13 April 2009. In the future, 29 historic locomotives from the EU member countries and also Switzerland will be exhibited in the roundhouse and on the turntable, the so-called Europa Roundhouse (Rundhaus Europa), which are protected historical buildings. In addition to the roundhouse there are also three historical steam locomotive halls with a workshop atmosphere and a historical smithy.

== Museum project and events ==
The Augsburg Railway Park offers the national railways of all EU states the opportunity to exhibit a historic locomotive (a so-called 'ambassador' locomotive) in the "Europa Roundhouse". The culture of the country of origin of an exhibition is always the focus. The historical locomotives will be accessible to visitors to the site or will be displayed on the turntable. From time to time there will also be national weeks (e. g. Austria week), sometimes with additional special exhibitions related to the region being celebrated. As part of some events there will be jazz concerts in the large steam engine hall and presentations in the smithy. In addition there are restaurants permanently on site. Regular jazz concerts (Jazz in the Railway Park) take place on the first Sunday in the month from May to September. In addition to the ambassador locomotives there are many other museum locomotives in the collection, which it has not always been easy to view before. The whole collection is being continually expanded. During Advent, special steam engine services are organised, that offer journeys through the winter landscape.

== The site ==
In 1906 the Royal Bavarian State Railways built two roundhouses with turntables south of the Augsburg Hauptbahnhof (Augsburg Central Station). On the area surrounding the Railway Park are further buildings (workshops, washdown areas, wheelset repair workshops and accommodation for the locomotive crews) belonging to the former repair shop together with trackage and a signal box. In the Second World War the area was largely spared from bomb damage, even on the devastating night of bombing from 25 to 26 February 1944 on Augsburg, during which the main station and station yard were badly damaged or destroyed. After the war the Deutsche Bundesbahn used the site until about 1990. Since 1996 the roundhouse has been placed under historical building protection. The owner of the site is the Aurelis Real Estate GmbH & Co.KG.

== Workshops ==
In the workshops of the Augsburg Railway Park, railway vehicles are refurbished and restored to museum standards. A historical post van was restored in these workshops for the Deutsches Museum's Transport Centre, a branch of the Deutsches Museum on the Teresienhöhe/Schwarntalerhöhe. The maintenance and preservation of the operational and protected DRG Class 41 steam locomotive, no. 41 018, belonging to the Munich Steam Locomotive Company (Dampflok-Gesellschaft München) was also carried out by these workshops.

== Vehicles in the Europa Roundhouse ==
- Railbus ET 91 01 The Glass Train (Gläserne Zug) (Germany)
- Electric locomotive CC 6503 "Aquitaine" (France)
- Electric locomotive BB 3600 The Ducal Crocodile (Das großherzogliche Krokodil) (Luxembourg), the SNCF BB 12000 is the French version of this engine class
- Electric locomotive Ae 4/7 The Gotthard Loco (Gotthard-Lok“) (Switzerland)
- Steam locomotive 06-013 Mountain Express (Gebirgs-Schnellzug-Dampflok) (Slovenia)
- Steam locomotive 93.1410 The Dampfbier Loco of the Ustersbach Private Brewery (Austria)
- Forest railway steam locomotive 764.449 Cozia-2 (Romania), a narrow gauge engine on its own plinth in the museum site
- Electric locomotive E 636 147 (Italy)

Further ambassador locomotives are planned for Spring 2008.

== Museum locomotives ==
- Steam locomotive DRG Class 41, no. 41 018 (Munich Steam Locomotive Company)
- Steam locomotive DRG Class 41, no. 41 364
- Goods train locomotive DRG Class 44, no. 44 606, Jumbo (Munich Steam Locomotive Company)
- Express train standard locomotive (Einheitsdampflok) DRB Class 01.10, no. 01 1081, (being restored)
- Electric locomotive E 16 09 Bavaria's Noble Racer (Bayerns Edelrenner)
- Electric locomotive E 18 08
- Electric locomotive E 63 05 and E 63 08
- Branch line locomotive E 69 02
- Goods train E 91 99 (on loan from the Nuremberg Transport Museum)
- Electric locomotive 1141.03
- Köf II 6311 and 6580 (operational, shunting duties in the Railway Park)
- Electric locomotive 120 003 (on loan from the Nuremberg Transport Museum)
- Electric locomotive E 71 19 (on loan from the Nuremberg Transport Museum)
- Railway trolley collection 'Rail midgets' (Schienenflöhe)
- Historic railway post van from 1926 and other railway postal vehicles (Nuremberg Museum of Communications) may be viewed in the steam engine hall

== Railway trolley collection 'rail midgets' (Schienenflöhe) ==
As well as the ambassador and museum locomotives stabled at the Augsburg Railway Park there is also a small collection of railway trolleys belonging to the Bavarian Railway Trolley Friends (Draisinenfreunde Bayern e.V.). This type of railway vehicle was formerly used by the railway maintenance divisions to inspect and maintain tracks and signal installations. The collection has a total of five vehicles: a touring trolley (Bereisungsdraisine) KLV 11, two maintenance trolleys, KLV 12 and 82, a Hungarian trolley, MAV Pft-P401, a rail bicycle and a rail moped. At the events there are often opportunities to ride in the KLV 11, something especially popular with children. The KLV 12, KLV 82 and MAV Pft-P401 trolleys are not currently operational and are being refurbished.

== Raupach steam engine ==
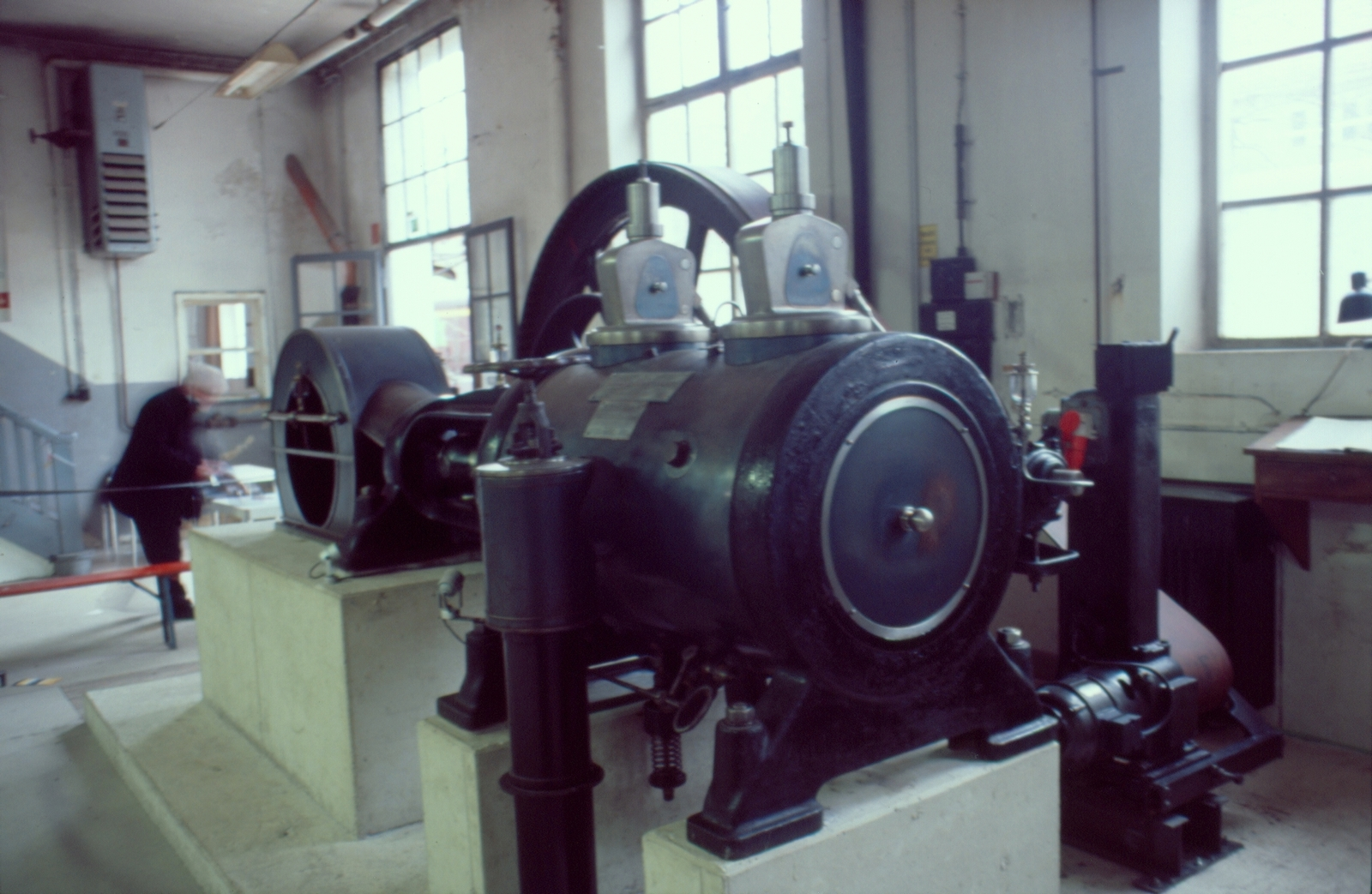
Raupach steam engine in its intermediate location

The static steam engine was built in 1911 by the engineering works of "Richard Raupach", based on the system by R. Lenke, in Görlitz. It could generate 75 PS. Once upon a time, more than 1000 examples of this engine were built, that were used in many factories to provide electrical energy. Originally this particular engine was delivered to the Schaaf Brewery in Niedermending near Koblenz, where it was in service in 1932. But in the same year the engine was sold to the distillery in Munich-Großhadern. There it was used to drive various aggregates. Not until the closure of the distillery in 2001 was the steam engine finally taken out of service, having operated for 90 years. Members of the Munich Steam Locomotive Company made contact with the distillery company and succeeded in acquiring the steam engine. On 26 July 2003, it was dismantled and moved by low-loader to the Railway Park. There it was temporarily housed in the northern roundhouse and restored. After the events exhibiting the steam engine in its intermediate location, it was moved at the end of October 2003. After further work, it was operational again on 16 July 2007. This time however it was not driven by steam, but for display purposed worked by an electric motor and illuminated.

== 150th anniversary of Rudolf Diesel ==
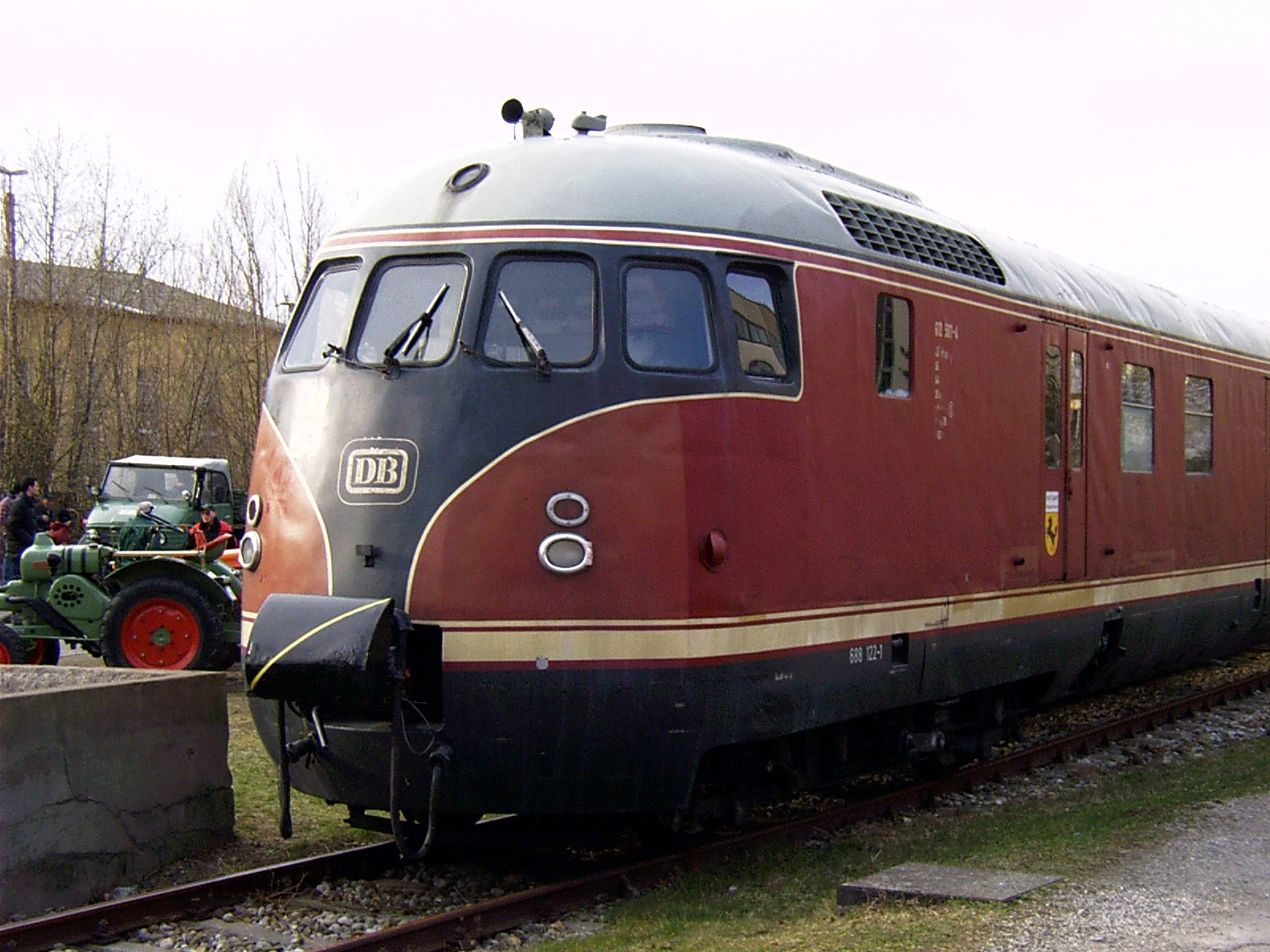
Diesel railbus VT 12.5 "Stuttgarter Rössle"

On the occasion of the 150th birthday of Rudolf Diesel in 2008 the Augsburg Railway Park hosted a large locomotive exhibition on Easter Monday on the theme of diesel locomotives. Not only were there diesel engines to be seen, but also historic lorries, buses, fire engines and tractors. The event's strap line was "Vehicles driven by diesel engines on rail or road". For younger visitors there was a children's programme with Easter egg hunts and tractor racing. One visitor was the diesel railbus VT 12.5 "Little Stuttgart Horse" (Stuttgarter Rößle) owned by the DB ZugBus Regionalverkehr Alb-Bodensee, with 220 passengers. The Railway Park had a record number of over 5000 visitors that day.

== Miscellaneous ==
At present there is a TEE (Trans-Europ-Express) train rake VT 601 with 9 centre coaches, the so-called Blue Star Train, next to the Railway Park on former DB land.

From the middle to end of November 2006 the Istanbul Orient Express train was stationed at the Augsburg Railway Park and could be visited during a two-day event. The chance to visit this historic train resonated with the public. The event was accompanied by a jazz concert and food as well as a special exhibition on the history of the Orient-Express. On 6 December 2006 the museum train began a special trip from Augsburg Main station to Salzburg. The train was hauled by an electric locomotive, not 41 018 as announced.

The Railway Park is a favourite destination of historic trains, such as the 01 1066 belonging to the Ulmer Eisenbahnfreunde (Ulm Railway Friends), which can be serviced and turned for the return journey.

== See also ==
- History of rail transport in Germany
- DB Museum
- Nuremberg Transport Museum
