= Stoom Stichting Nederland =

Railway museum in Rotterdam, Netherlands

Coordinates: 51°56′39.7″N 4°30′26.3″E

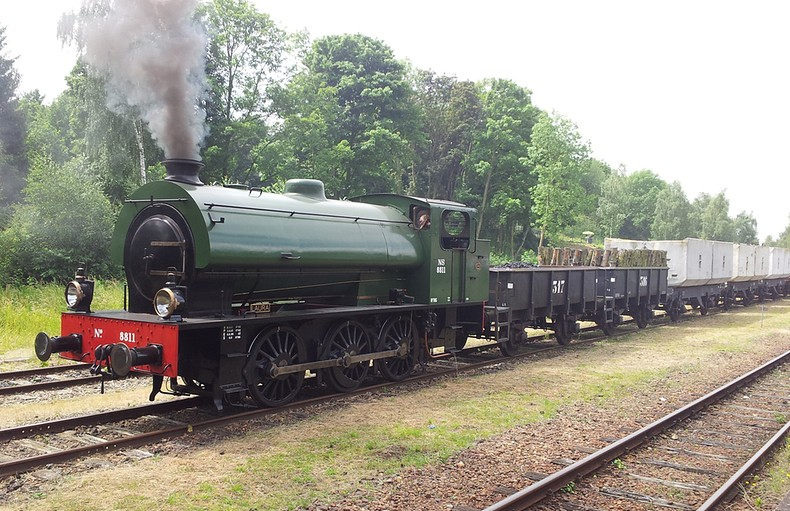
SSN 8811 visiting the ZLSM in Simpelveld.

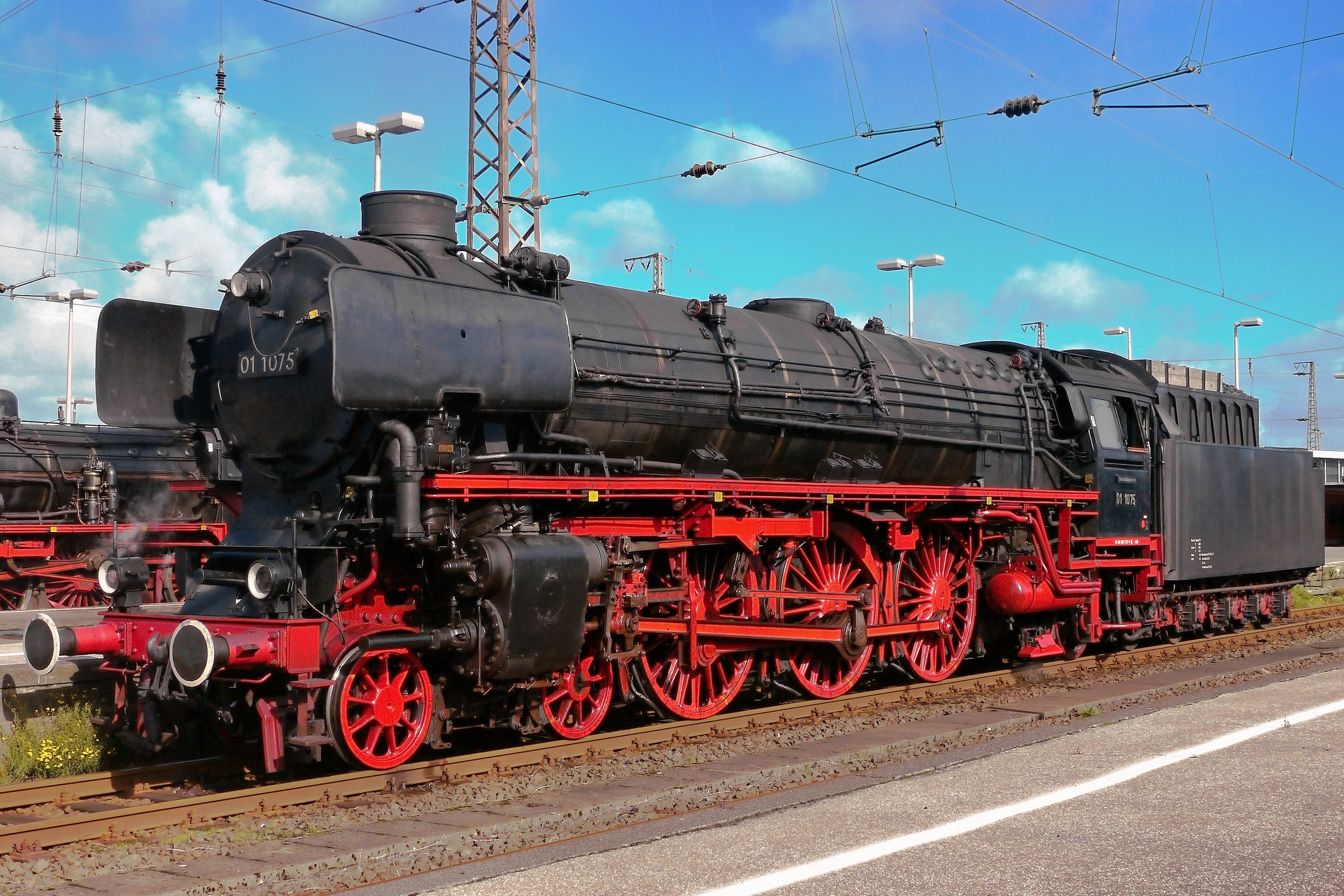
SSN's express steam locomotive SSN 01 1075 at Oberhausen Central Station on 25 September 2010 whilst operating a special near Königswinter

The Stoom Stichting Nederland (SSN) is a railway museum in Rotterdam, Netherlands, founded in 1976.

== Facilities ==
The SSN owns a motive power depot which includes a locomotive shed, in which major repairs can be carried out. A turntable, platforms and locomotive facilities also form part of the site. In the museum's engine shed, a large collection of steam locomotives from Germany and the Netherlands may be viewed. Several times a year special train services run throughout the Netherlands and may sometimes be seen in Germany too.

== German steam locomotives ==
| Running number | Built | Manufacturer | Status |
|---|---|---|---|
| DRG Class 01.1075 | 1940 | Berliner Maschinenbau | working |
| DB Class 23 023 | 1952 | Arnold Jung Lokomotivfabrik | in overhaul |
| DRG Class 41 105 | 1939 | Friedrich Krupp AG | |
| DRG Class 41 241 | 1939 | A. Borsig, Berlin-Tegel | moved to VSM, Apeldoorn |
| DRG Class 50 1255 | 1941 | Arnold Jung Lokomotivfabrik | |
| DB Class 65 018 | 1955 | Krauss Maffei | taken out of service in November 2018 |

== Dutch steam locomotives ==
| Running number | Built | Manufacturer | Status |
|---|---|---|---|
| 6326 | 1914 | Orenstein & Koppel | working fireless engine, moved to STAR in stadskanaal in August 2017 |
| NS 8811 | 1943 | Hudswell Clarke Hunslet Austerity 0-6-0ST | three-axled shunter working |
