= DRB Class 41 =

Class of 366 German 2-8-2 locomotives

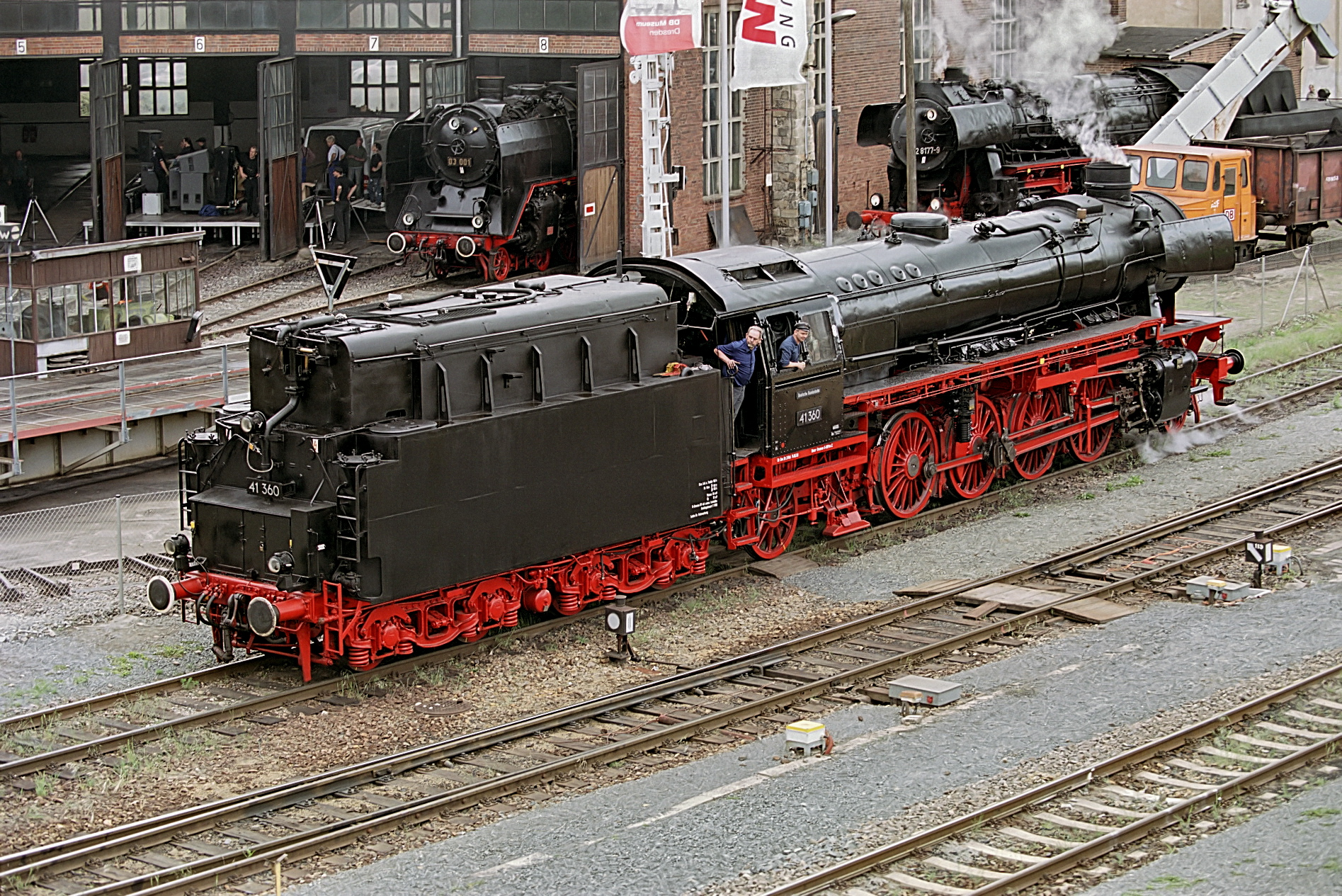
- 41 360 at Dresden-Altstadt depot in 2003
Type and origin
- Power type: Steam
- Builder: Berliner Maschinenbau (25); Borsig (73); Maschinenfabrik Esslingen (35); Henschel & Sohn (86); Arnold Jung Lokomotivfabrik (40); Krauss-Maffei (18); Krupp (31); Orenstein & Koppel (21); Schichau-Werke (37)
- Build date: 1937–1941
- Total produced: 366
Specifications
- Configuration
  - Whyte: 2-8-2
  - UIC: 1′D1′ h2
  - German: G 46.18/G 46.20
- Gauge: 1,435 mm (4 ft 8 1/2 in)
- Leading dia.: 1,000 mm (39 3/8 in)
- Driver dia.: 1,600 mm (63 in)
- Trailing dia.: 1,250 mm (49 1/4 in)
- Tender wheels: 1,000 mm (39 3/8 in)
- Wheelbase
  - Axle spacing (Asymmetrical): 3,000 mm (118 1/8 in) +; 1,850 mm (72 7/8 in) +; 1,850 mm (72 7/8 in) +; 1,850 mm (72 7/8 in) +; 3,500 mm (137 3/4 in) =
  - Engine: 12,050 mm (39 ft 6 3/8 in)
  - Tender: 1,900 mm (74 3/4 in) +; 1,900 mm (74 3/4 in) +; 1,900 mm (74 3/4 in) =; 5,700 mm (224 3/8 in)
  - incl. tender: 20,175 mm (66 ft 2 1/4 in)
- Length
  - Over headstocks: 22,605 mm (74 ft 2 in)
  - Over buffers: 23,905 mm (78 ft 5 1/8 in)
- Height: 4,550 mm (179 1/8 in)
- Axle load: 17.5 or 19.5 t (17.2 or 19.2 long tons; 19.3 or 21.5 short tons)
- Adhesive weight: 70.0 or 78.0 t (68.9 or 76.8 long tons; 77.2 or 86.0 short tons)
- Empty weight: 92.6 t (91.1 long tons; 102.1 short tons)
- Service weight: 101.9 t (100.3 long tons; 112.3 short tons)
- Tender type: 2′2′ T 34
- Fuel type: Coal
- Fuel capacity: 10.0 t (9.8 long tons; 11.0 short tons)
- Water cap.: 34.0 m^{3} (7,500 imp gal; 9,000 US gal)
- Firebox
  - Grate area: 4.1 m^{2} (44 sq ft)
- Boiler
  - Pitch: 3,100 mm (10 ft 2 in)
  - Tube plates: 6,800 mm (22 ft 3 3/4 in)
  - Small tubes: 70 mm (2 3/4 in), 85 off
  - Large tubes: 171 mm (6 3/4 in), 20 off
- Boiler pressure: 20 bar (20.4 kgf/cm^{2}; 290 psi)
- Heating surface
  - Firebox: 16.2 m^{2} (174 sq ft)
  - Tubes: 117.9 m^{2} (1,269 sq ft)
  - Flues: 69.6 m^{2} (749 sq ft)
  - Total surface: 203.7 m^{2} (2,193 sq ft)
- Superheater
  - Heating area: 72.2 m^{2} (777 sq ft)
- Cylinders: Two, outside
- Cylinder size: 520 mm × 720 mm (20 1/2 in × 28 3/8 in)
- Valve gear: Heusinger (Walschaerts)
- Valve type: Piston Valve
- Train heating: Steam
- Loco brake: Knorr Steam
- Train brakes: Knorr
- Couplers: Screw links
Performance figures
- Maximum speed: Forwards: 90 km/h (56 mph); Backwards: 50 km/h (31 mph)
- Indicated power: 1,900 PS (1,400 kW; 1,870 hp)
- Power output: 1,900 PS (1,400 kW; 1,870 hp)
Career
- Operators: DRB
- Numbers: 41 001 – 41 366
- Nicknames: Ochsenlok
- Retired: 1986
- Disposition: 21 preserved (five operational, nine static display, rest in varying states of repair), remainder scrapped

The German Class 41 steam locomotives were standard goods train engines (Einheitslokomotiven) operated by the Deutsche Reichsbahn (DRB) and built from 1937 to 1941.

== History ==
In the search for a new, fast, goods train locomotive, the Deutsche Reichsbahn-Gesellschaft (DRG) in 1934 was attracted by the proposal from the Berliner Maschinenbau (BMAG, formerly Louis Schwartzkopff) for a 2-8-2 (1′D1′h2) engine. The design, produced by Friedrich Wilhelm Eckhardt (1892–1961), differed from the DRG's original requirement for a 2-8-0 (1′D) engine, because the required performance with an 18-ton axle load was easier to generate on a 2-8-2 engine rather than one with a 2-8-0 wheel configuration. Continued adherence to this instruction would in the end have given the new engine no significant advantage over the Prussian goods train locomotives which were to be withdrawn. The Reichsbahn Central Office Engineering Works (RZM) eventually agreed to this proposal; the BMAG was tasked to develop the proposed design and produce two prototypes.

In January 1937 the two prototype locomotives, 41 001 and 41 002, were delivered to the DRG, who subsequently tested them thoroughly and bought them. The prototypes soon proved themselves, with their power, performance and quiet riding qualities, as well as their exceptional acceleration.

In developing the Class 41, the principle of having standard locomotives (Einheitsloks) demonstrated the financial advantages of standardization. For example, the construction costs of the engine, through the use of components from the simultaneously developed Class 03, 06 and 45 engines, was under 10,000 Reichsmarks.

From October 1938, the first full-scale production Class 41 locomotives were ordered by the now renamed (since February 1937) Deutsche Reichsbahn (DRB). All the well-known locomotive manufacturers in Germany participated in the building of the locomotives, including BMAG, Borsig, Maschinenfabrik Esslingen, Henschel & Sohn, Arnold Jung Lokomotivfabrik, Krauss-Maffei, Krupp, Orenstein & Koppel and Schichau.

Unlike the prototype locomotives, counter (was: 'corner') valve pressure compensators were omitted from the production locos and Nicolai pressure compensating tubular valves (later Karl Schultz valves) were used to give a better ride when running light. On the valve gear, the normal lifting link (Hängeeisen) replaced the Kuhn slides of the prototypes which were expensive to manufacture.

As with Classes 03, 45 and 50, the 20-bar (290 psi) boiler made of St 47 K steel, which aged and embrittled rapidly, soon caused major problems. As early as 1941, the DRB decreed a reduction of the permissible operating pressure to 16 bars (232 psi). In this way the wear and tear on the boiler could at least be slowed.

The axle load of the locomotive could be switched between 18 t and 20 t by inserting bolts into different sockets in the equalising beams. This was supposed to enable the locomotive to be more versatile in its use. Little or no use was made of this flexibility however. The Deutsche Bundesbahn and East German DR later left the bolts in the 18 t setting.

The locomotives were, with the exception of the prototypes, coupled to 2′2′ T 34 tenders. The prototypes, 41 001 and 41 002, had 2′2′ T 32 tenders on delivery. From their use of 20-metre (65 ft 7 in) turntables, it is also known that some engines were running with 2′2 T 30 tenders.

The advent of war increasingly stifled the purchase of fast goods train locomotives until, in January 1941, the existing orders were cancelled completely. On 2 June 1941, MF Esslingen delivered the last Class 41 locomotive, no. 41 352, to the DRB. With that a total of 366 engines of this class had been built in just under four years.

== Preserved locomotives ==
After the Second World War, 216 engines went into the Deutsche Bundesbahn fleet and 122 were left in the hands of the DR in East Germany. There is evidence that, in addition, 22 locomotives were left in the former Reichsbahn railway division of Breslau in Poland and later incorporated into the Polish State Railways (PKP) as Ot 1-1 to Ot 1-19. Number 41 153 was listed on the books of the Czechoslovak State Railways (ČSD) after 1945. Number 41 034 as well as other locomotives (41 076, 41 082 and 41 312) from locomotive convoys (reparations) were left in the territory of the Soviet State Railway (SZD) and later transferred to the PKP. The fate of other locomotives is unknown.

As a result of the employment of the two prototype locomotives at Schneidemühl (present-day Piła) locomotive shed in heading express cattle trains to Berlin, the engines were unflatteringly christened Ochsenlok (Oxen loco).

== DB rebuild ==
DB Class 41
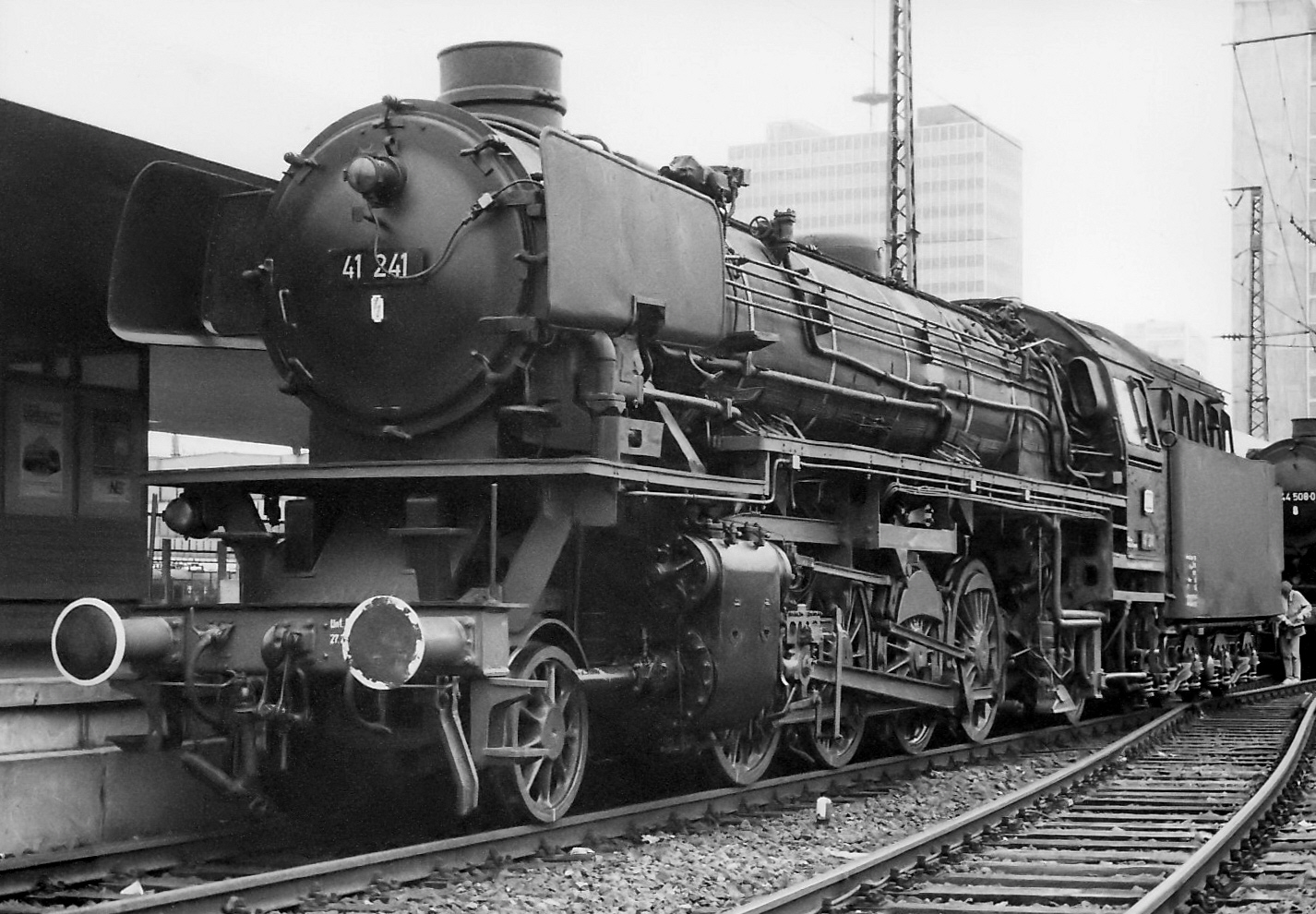
- 41 241 in Essen Main station in the 1980s
Type and origin
- Power type: Steam
- Rebuilder: DB workshops with boilers from Henschel & Sohn and Maschinenfabrik Esslingen
- Rebuild date: 1957–1961
- Number rebuilt: 107
Specifications
  - German: G 46.18
- Height: 4,280 mm (14 ft 1/2 in)
- Axle load: 18.6 t (18.3 long tons; 20.5 short tons)
- Adhesive weight: Coal: 74.5 t (73.3 long tons; 82.1 short tons); Oil: 74.3 t (73.1 long tons; 81.9 short tons)
- Empty weight: Coal: 93.2 t (91.7 long tons; 102.7 short tons); Oil: 93.1 t (91.6 long tons; 102.6 short tons)
- Service weight: Coal: 101.5 t (99.9 long tons; 111.9 short tons); Oil: 101.3 t (99.7 long tons; 111.7 short tons)
- Total weight: 175.7 t (172.9 long tons; 193.7 short tons)
- Fuel type: Coal or oil fuel
- Fuel capacity: Oil: 12 m^{3} (2,600 imp gal; 3,200 US gal)
- Firebox
  - Grate area: 3.9 m^{2} (42 sq ft)
- Boiler
  - Tube plates: 5,200 mm (17 ft 3/4 in)
  - Small tubes: 54 mm (2 1/8 in), 80 off
  - Large tubes: 143 mm (5 5/8 in), 42 off
- Boiler pressure: 16 bar (16.3 kgf/cm^{2}; 232 psi)
- Heating surface
  - Firebox: 21.2 m^{2} (228 sq ft)
  - Tubes: 64.0 m^{2} (689 sq ft)
  - Flues: 92.3 m^{2} (994 sq ft)
  - Total surface: 177.5 m^{2} (1,911 sq ft)
- Superheater
  - Heating area: 95.8 m^{2} (1,031 sq ft)
Performance figures
- Indicated power: 1,940 PS (1,430 kW; 1,910 hp)
Career
- Operators: Deutsche Bundesbahn
- Numbers: 41 006 ... 41 366
- Retired: 1975
- Data only shown where it differs from the Einheitslok

Because the boiler of these engines suffered from metal fatigue, they began to be repaired in the 1950s. Between 1957 and 1961, 107 vehicles were fitted with fully welded boilers, like those installed on the Class 03.10. In addition the front part of the frame and the running plate were changed. Forty examples were converted to oil-firing with heavy oil. From 1968, these were designated as Class 042. The last Class 042 steam locomotives were retired in 1977 at Rheine locomotive shed. The photograph (right) shows one as a museum loco, now reclassified to Class 41 (the pre-1968 designation).

The former DB locomotives, 41 105 and 41 241, have been preserved as representatives of their class by Stoom Stichting Nederland in the Netherlands. Number 41 018, an operational loco owned by the Munich Steam Locomotive Company, is stabled at the Augsburg Railway Park and 41 113 is exhibited in the Technical Museum at Sinsheim. The Osnabrück Steam Engine Friends are working hard to restore 41 052 to operational status, after it had stood for a long time as a monument at Osnabrück-Schinkel. Number 41 096 is preserved as operational loco at Klein-Mahner. Number 41 360 is operated by the Dampflok-Tradition Oberhausen e.V. Since the end of ban on steam locomotives, she has provided a comprehensive programme of journeys on the Deutsche Bahn's railway network.

- 41 018 oil-fired Dampflok-Gesellschaft München e.V.
- 41 096 oil-fired Dampflok-Gemeinschaft 41 096 e.V.

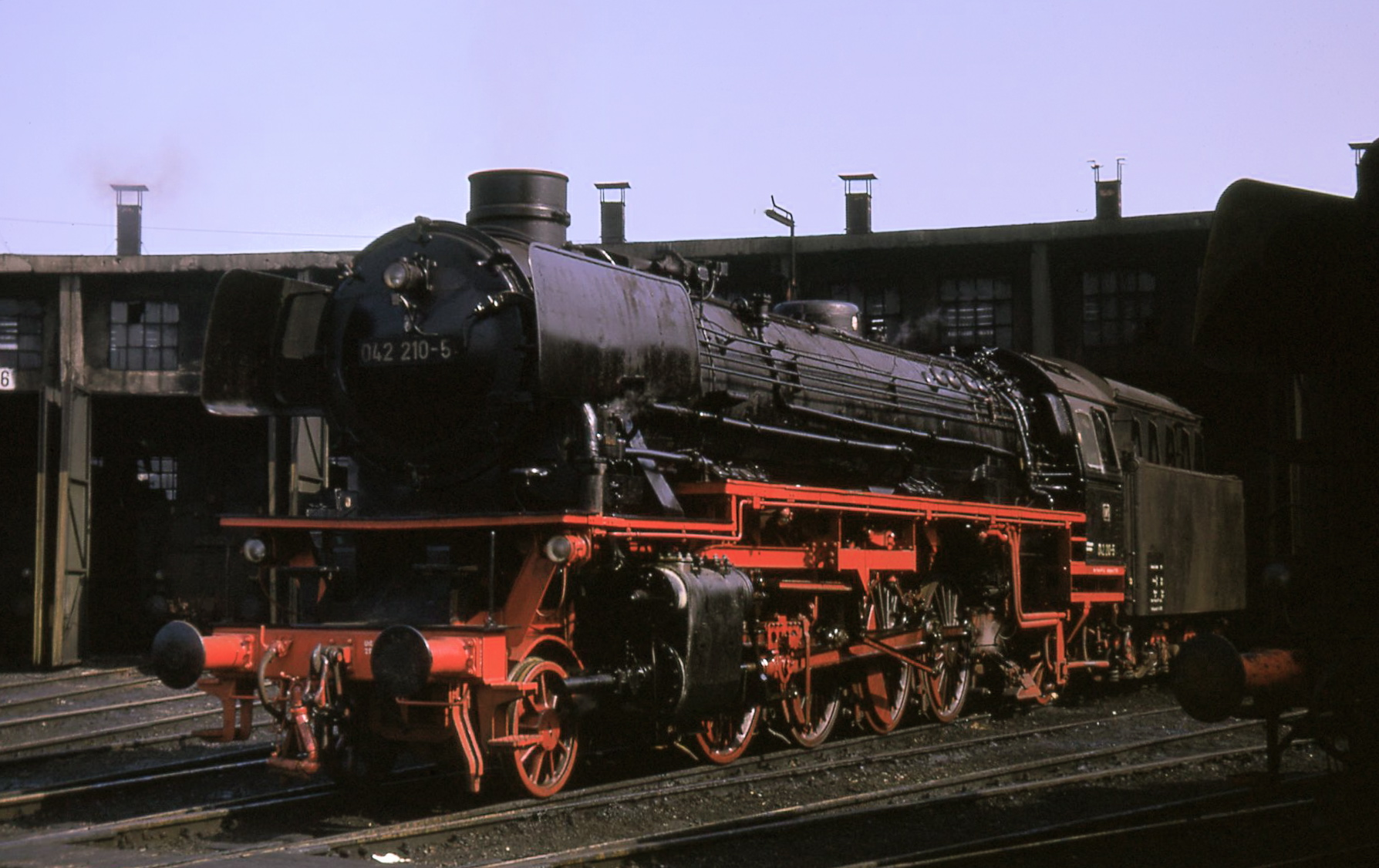
Oil-burning 042 (=041) class 2-8-2 at Rheine shed, Easter 1974

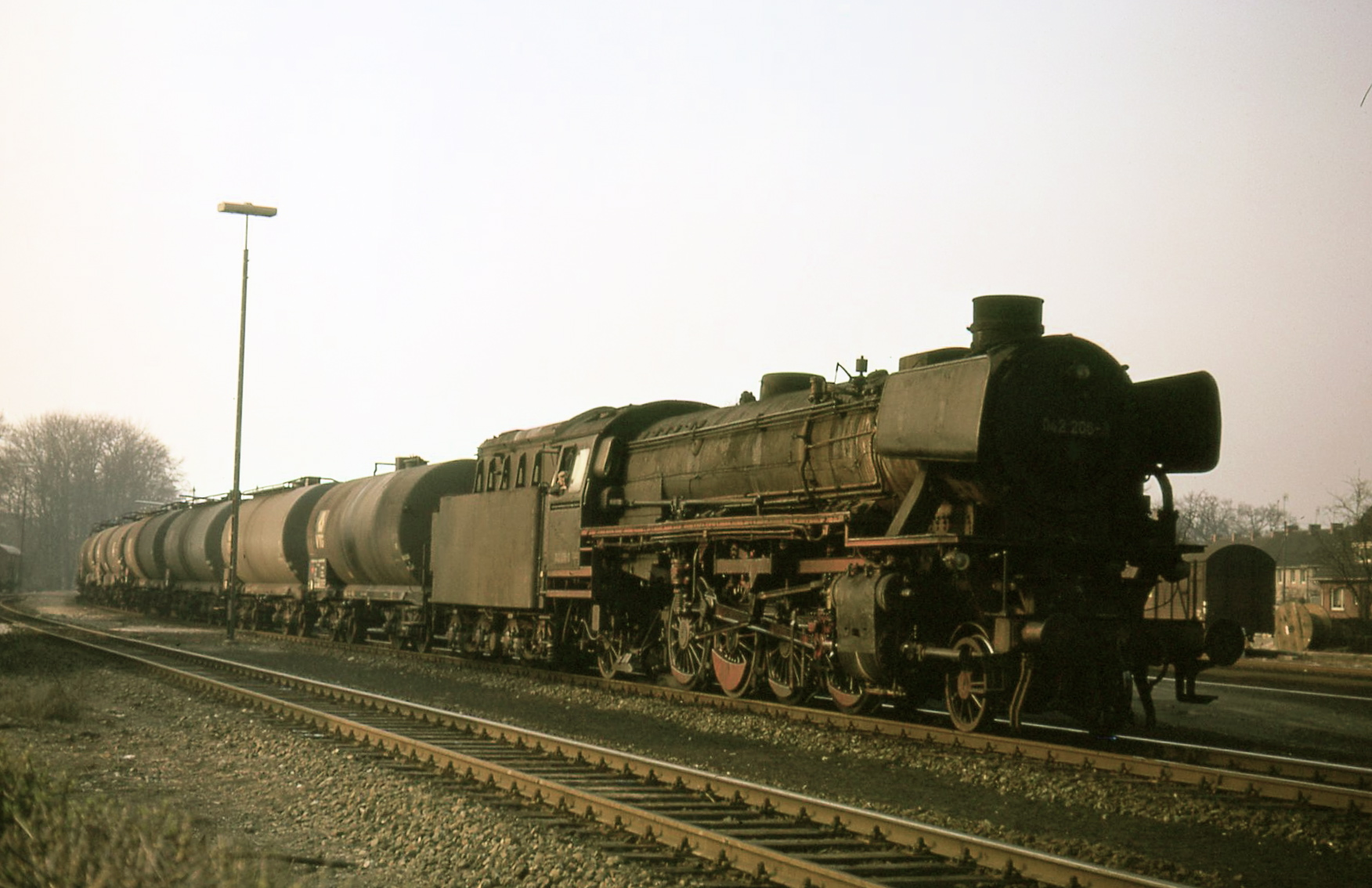
Oil-burning 042 (=041) class 2-8-2 with tank wagons north of Rheine, Easter 1974

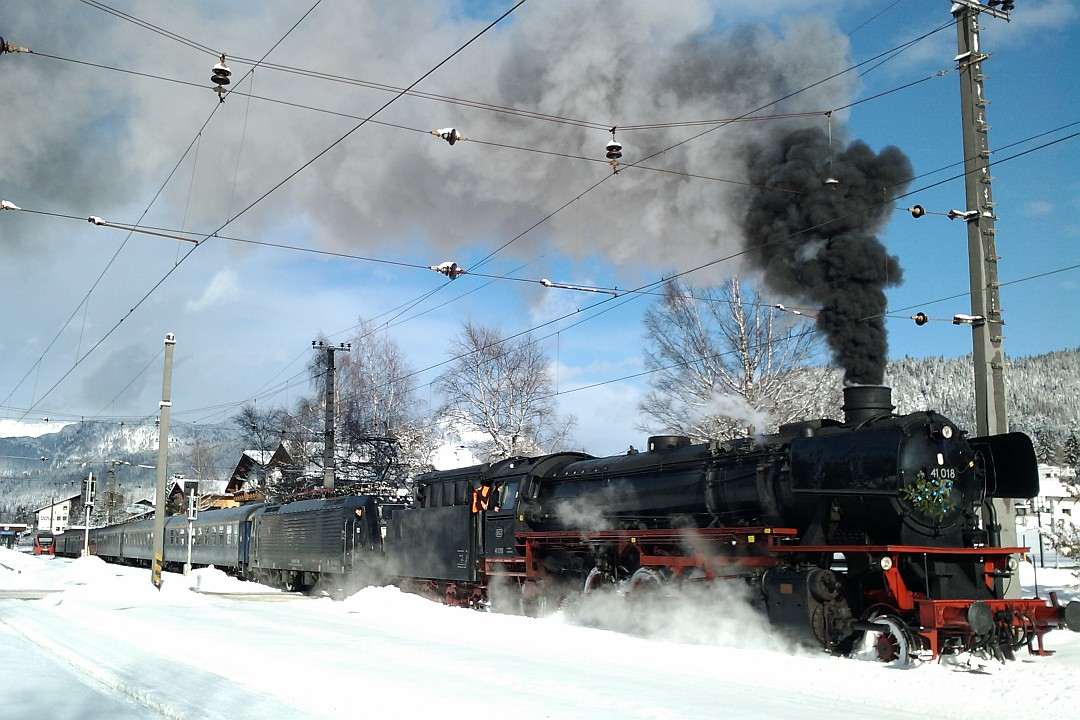
41 018 in Seefeld, Tirol, December 2011

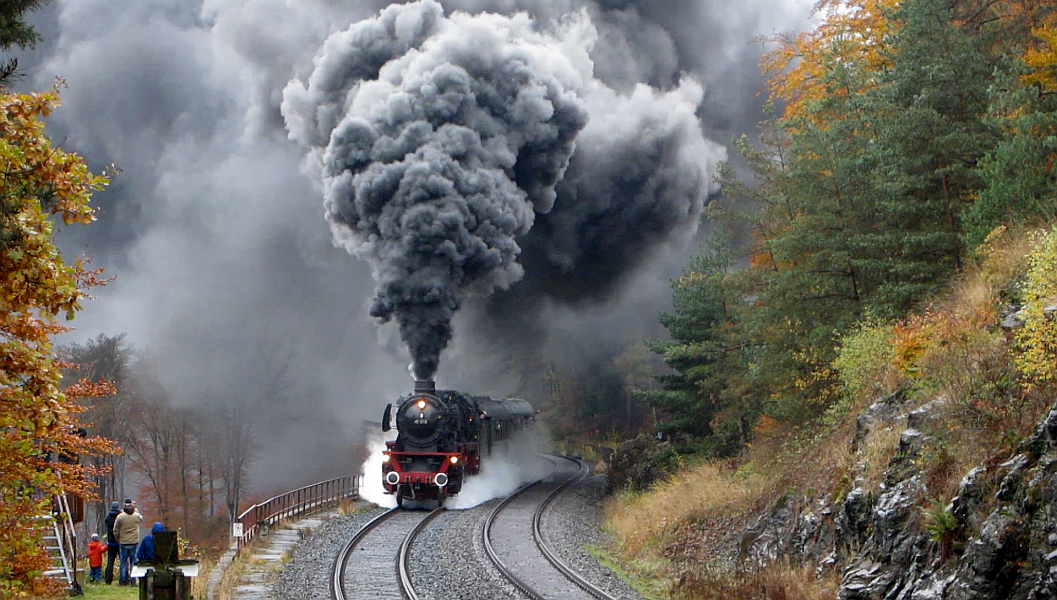
41 018 climbing the Schiefe Ebene

== DR Class 41 and DR Rekolok ==
DR Class 41 (Rekolok)
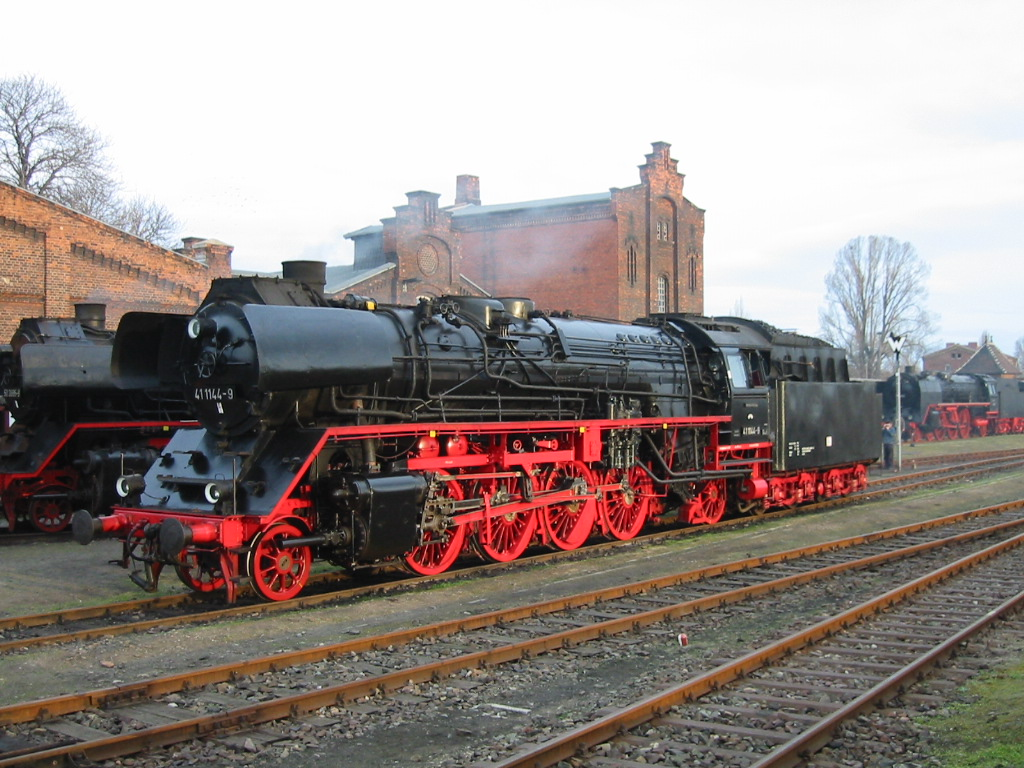
- 41 1144-9 of the IGE „Werrabahn Eisenach e. V.“
Type and origin
- Power type: Steam
- Rebuilder: RAW Zwickau; RAW Karl-Marx-Stadt; boiler from RAW Halberstadt
- Rebuild date: 1959–1960 (rebuilding)
- Number rebuilt: 80
Specifications
  - German: G 46.18
- Axle load: 17.7 t (17.4 long tons; 19.5 short tons)
- Adhesive weight: 70.9 t (69.8 long tons; 78.2 short tons)
- Empty weight: 92.3 t (90.8 long tons; 101.7 short tons)
- Service weight: 103.2 t (101.6 long tons; 113.8 short tons)
- Total weight: 178.7 t (175.9 long tons; 197.0 short tons)
- Firebox
  - Grate area: 4.2 m^{2} (45 sq ft)
- Boiler
  - Model: 39E
  - Tube plates: 5,700 mm (18 ft 8 3/8 in)
  - Small tubes: 54 mm (2 1/8 in), 112 off
  - Large tubes: 143 mm (5 5/8 in), 36 off
- Boiler pressure: 16 bar (16.3 kgf/cm^{2}; 232 psi)
- Heating surface
  - Firebox: 21.3 m^{2} (229 sq ft)
  - Tubes: 98.3 m^{2} (1,058 sq ft)
  - Flues: 86.7 m^{2} (933 sq ft)
  - Total surface: 206.3 m^{2} (2,221 sq ft)
- Superheater
  - Heating area: 83.8 m^{2} (902 sq ft)
Performance figures
- Indicated power: 1,950 PS (1,430 kW; 1,920 hp)
Career
- Operators: Deutsche Reichsbahn (GDR)
- Numbers: 41 003 ... 41 357
- data only shown where it differs from the Einheitslok

The DR too had difficulties with boilers made of St 47 K steel. The reduction of boiler overpressure from 20 to 16 bar had certainly slowed their susceptibility to damage, but could not prevent it entirely. Of the 112 locomotives recorded in the DR fleet in 1955, only 12 had already been equipped with a '1943 Type' replacement boiler and were therefore safe. Problems with the St 47 K boilers, however, increased massively. Repair welding did not produce the desired effect, but made the material even more brittle and the danger of cracks developing and boiler explosions was greater than before. And it was not just the Class 41 that was affected. Classes 03, 03.10 and 50, with boilers made of non-aging St 47 K, were also prone to damage. As a result of increasing difficulties the DR had to withdraw over 300 locomotives from service in 1956 which abruptly led to an enormous shortage of engines. The urgent call for action which then resulted led at last to the development and subsequent ordering of a new boiler (later called the 39E) that, with a few minor alterations, was also usable on locomotive classe 03, 03.10 and 39.

Because the delivery of the new boilers kept being delayed, 21 Class 41 locomotives were simply fitted with replacement boilers to the old design by January 1959. Even the Meiningen repair shop made a complete copy of the old boiler for 41 075. Other damaged boilers were fully repaired and many parts replaced.

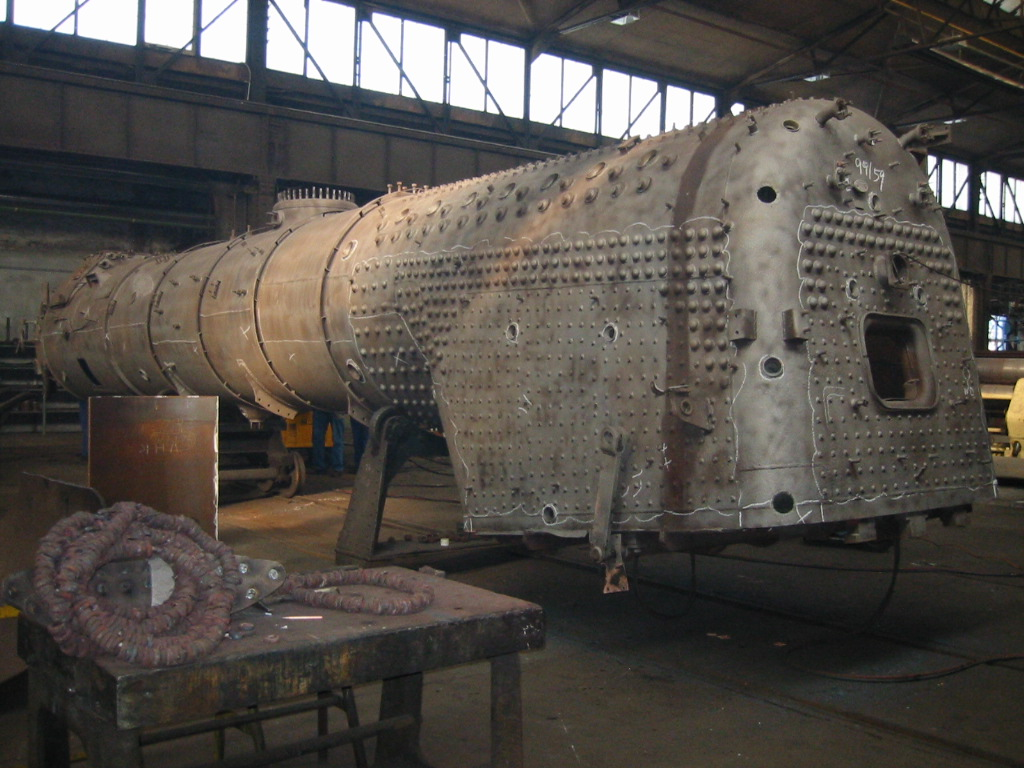
Combustion chamber boiler of type 39E (Meiningen, 2003)

Regardless of that, DR engineers worked on a "reconstruction programme for the recovery of the steam locomotive fleet". This envisaged, amongst other things, the modernisation of 102 Class 41 locomotives. The German term used for reconstruction was Rekonstruktion or Reko for short, hence the subsequent designation of the locomotives as Rekolokomotiven or Rekoloks.

Demarcation disputes, disagreements over the detail of the reconstruction programme and the continued non-delivery of the Reko boiler, delayed the start of work still further. Only the explosion of 03 1046's St47K boiler in 1958 at Wünsdorf led to pressure from the then transport minister, Erwin Kramer (1902–1979), to get started on the Reko programme.

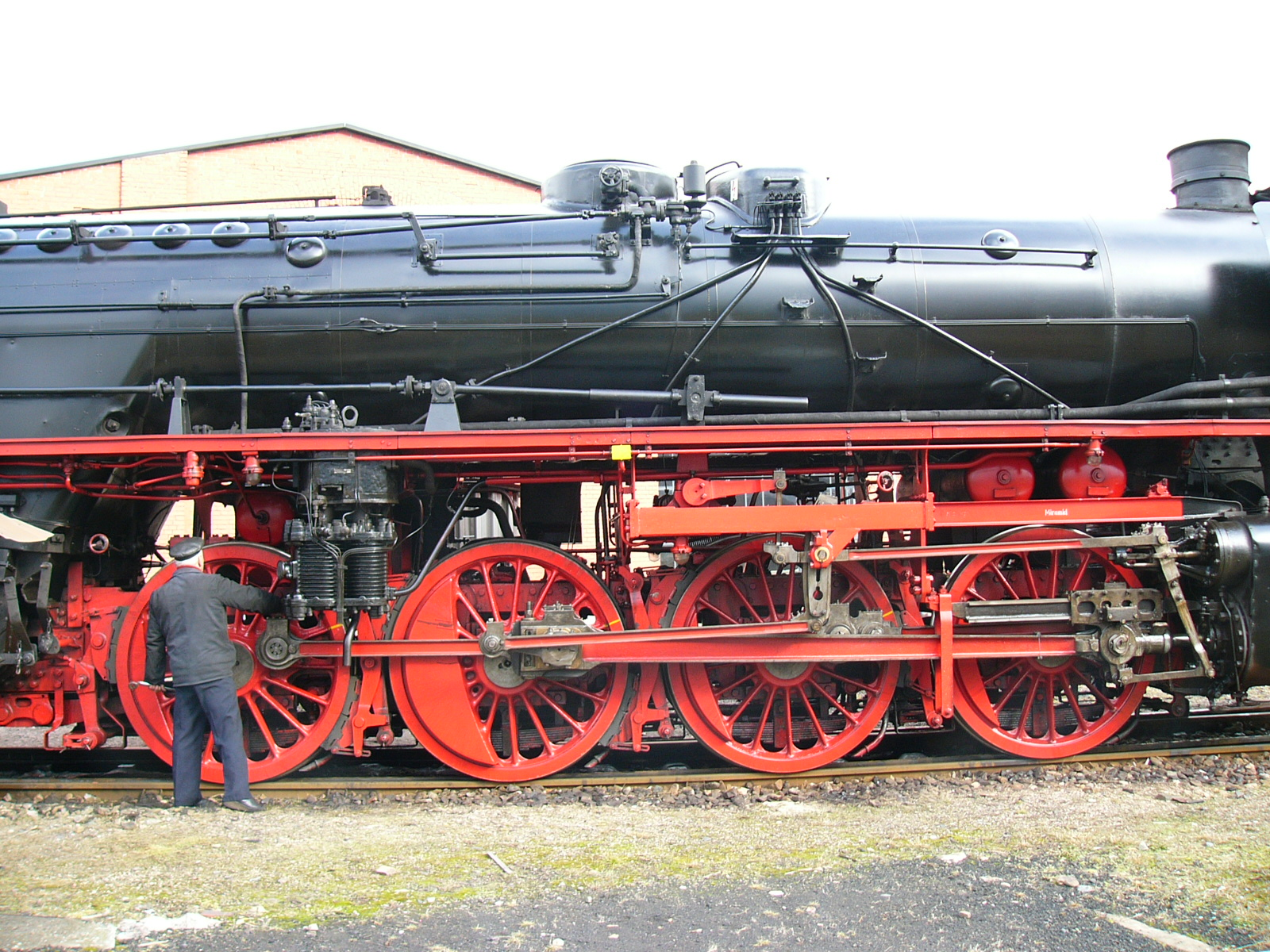
The mighty drive of a Reko 41, (2006)

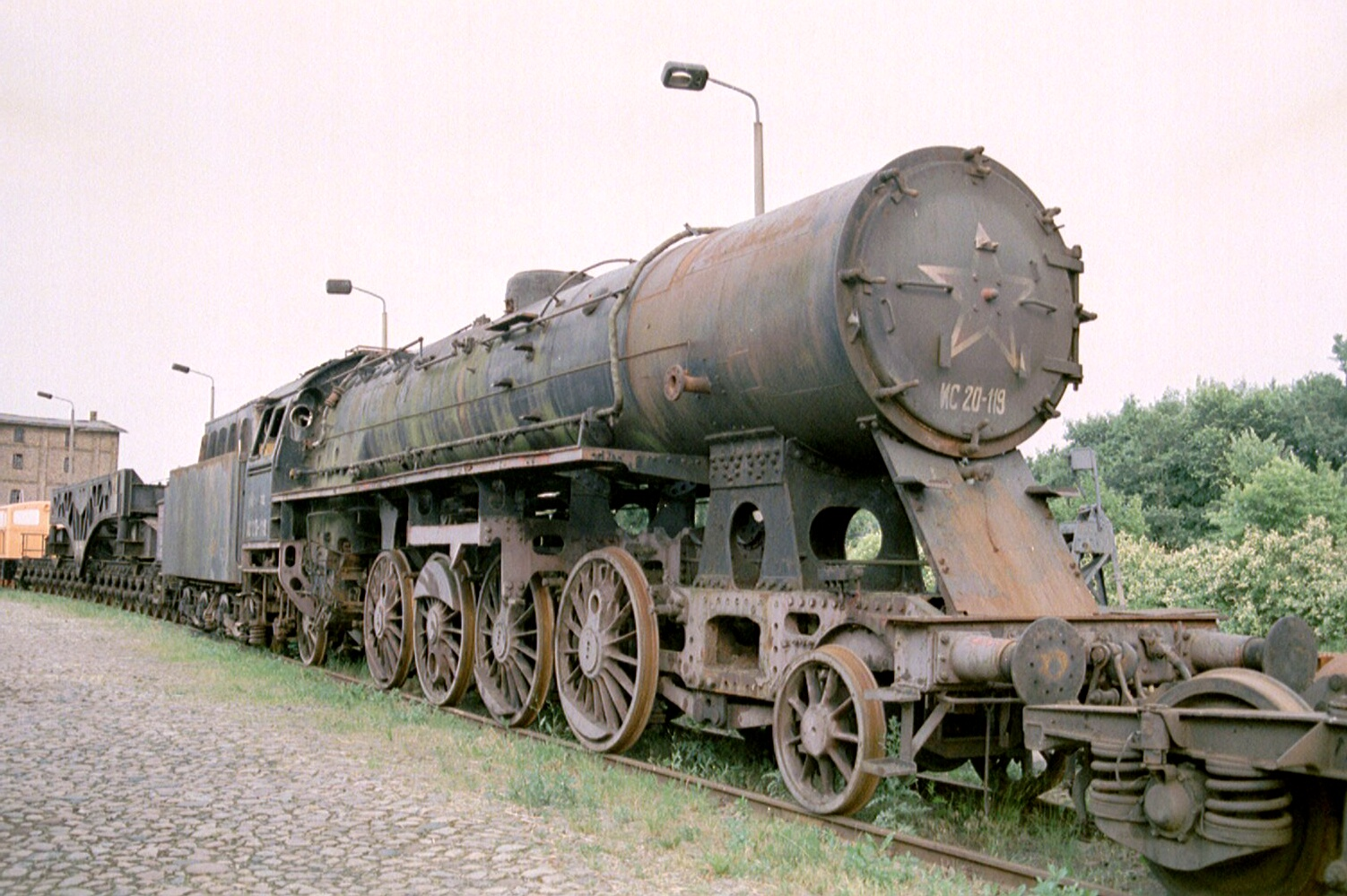
Heating locomotive from Rekolokomotive 41 1303, (Röbel 2007)

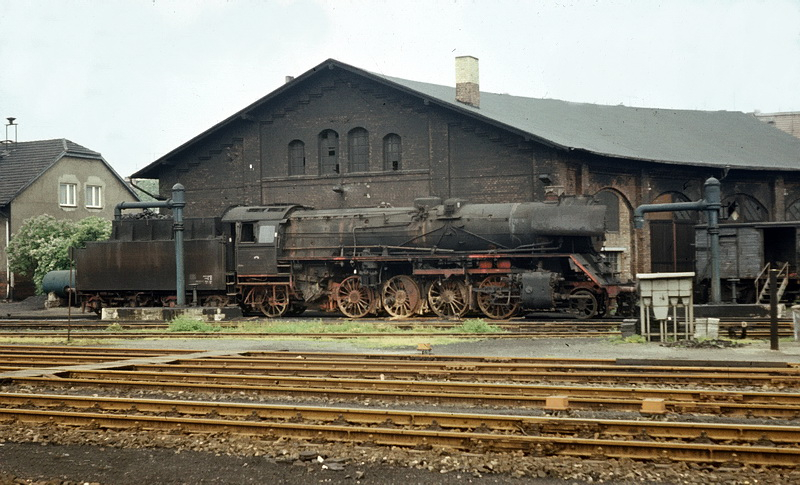
Class 41 for scrapping, sidelined in Stendal, (1979)

From 1959 onwards, 80 Class 41 locomotives were to be given the new 39E Reko boilers in the Zwickau and Karl Marx Stadt Reichsbahn repair shops (Reichsbahnausbesserungswerke or RAW).

As part of the rebuild, IfS/DR mixer preheaters, pressure-compensating piston valves (Trofimoff valves) and new Stühren ash pans were installed. The wider outer firebox needed new front walls to the driver's cab, the front windows of which were equipped with demisting equipment. For the larger and heavier VMP 15-20 compounded mixer pump (Verbundmischpumpe) a new pump mount had to be built. This and the new mixer preheater apparatus required a different arrangement for the main air reservoir. The outside cylinders with a diameter of just 520 mm (20 in), originally designed for boiler pressures of 20 bar, were retained however. In the course of the rebuild, the brakes on the front carrying axle were removed.

The 39E Reko boiler fitted to the engines is a combustion chamber boiler and can generate 15 tons of steam per hour, thanks to the improved ratio of radiative to tube heating area. This is considerably higher than, for example, the new DB boiler which generates only 13.3 tons of steam per hour. Fitted with this boiler, the engine was able to exceed the performance requirements that it originally had for the 20 bar boilers, in spite of its small cylinders.

The engines rebuilt in this way are classified as Rekolokomotiven. Following their conversion, the DR gave all Class 41 locomotives the extra digit 1 under their 1970 renumbering scheme, so that e.g. number 41 122 became number 41 1122-5. In contrast to other classes, the Class 41 was not given a separate sub-class to distinguish Reko from non-Reko locomotives.

Class 41 Rekoloks could be seen in regular train service until 1988. The second oil crisis in 1979/80, and its effect on the GDR's economy, granted quite a number of Class 41 engines a short return to operational duties. Even several locomotives earmarked for scrapping were refurbished and were given a new general inspection service. The Meiningen repair shed refurbished a total of 23 locomotives of this class between 1980 and 1983. But by the end of September 1984, Oebisfelde shed withdrew the 41s and transferred its locomotives to Güsten shed. Göschwitz station, a satellite of Saalfeld shed was the next to send its 41s to the storage sidings in November 1986, and at the beginning of May 1988, Staßfurt (Bw Güsten) parted company with the last Class 41 locomotive, 41 1231, in regular service in the DR.

The Class 41 was the most versatile steam locomotive in the DR's engine fleet and hauled high-profile express and fast trains, as well as goods and passenger services.

Number 41 1185 was a DR heritage locomotive, now in the ownership of the Nuremberg Transport Museum.

A further 8 Rekolokomotiven are in varying states of repair. See the list of preserved steam locomotives in Germany

== List of preserved locomotives ==
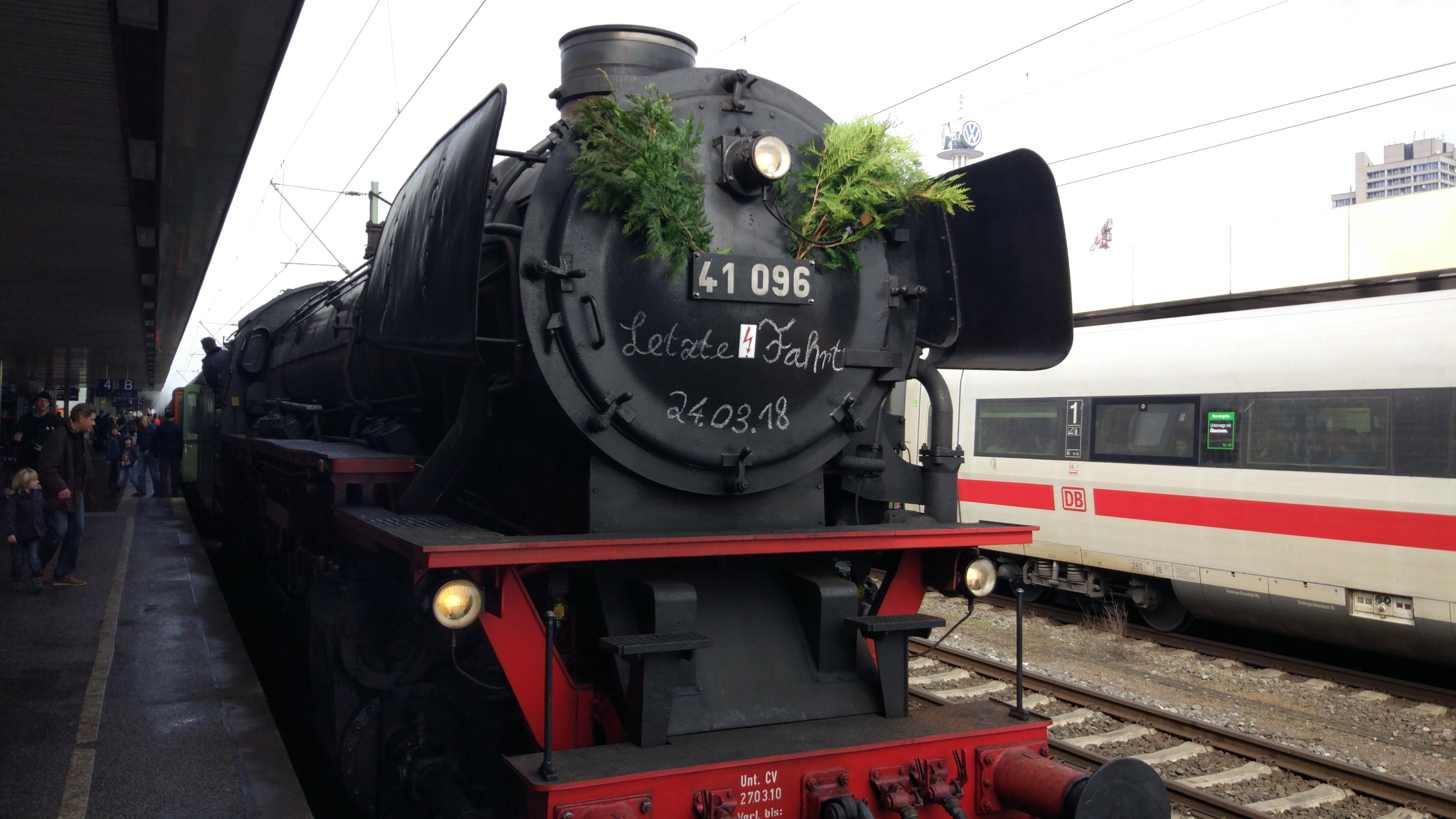
41 096 on its last service at Hanover Central on 24 March 2018

Currently the locomotives listed below have been preserved such that they are able to be displayed. Three are operational. A further 8 Rekolokomotiven are in varying states of repair. See the list of preserved steam locomotives in Germany

- 41 1144-9, IGE "Werrabahn Eisenach" (Eisenach); operational; in service,
- 41 1150-6, Bavarian Railway Museum (Nördlingen), operational (HU inspection certificate expired)
- 41 052, Osnabrücker Dampflokfreunde (Osnabrück); being renovated in 2022,
- 41 096, Dampflok-Gemeinschaft 41 096 (Klein Mahner); HU inspection certificate expired,
- 41 105, Stoom Stichting Nederland SSN (Rotterdam),
- 41 241, Veluwsche Stoomtrein Maatschappij VSM (Beekbergen) operational in coal,
- 41 271, Rendsburger Eisenbahnfreunde (Neumünster),
- 41 360, Eigentümergemeinschaft (Oberhausen); not accessible, HU inspection certificate expired, stored due to bankruptcy,
- 41 1231-4, Traditionsbetriebswerk Staßfurt,
- 41 024, Darmstadt-Kranichstein Railway Museum,
- 41 018, Munich Steam Locomotive Company, location Bahnpark Augsburg (operational)
- 41 226 Tuttlingen Railway Museum
- 41 364 Owned by Bayernbahn, on loan to the Bavarian Railway Museum (Nördlingen)
- 41 073 EBM Heilbronn
- 41 186 EBM Dieringhausen
- 41 113 Technikmuseum Sinsheim

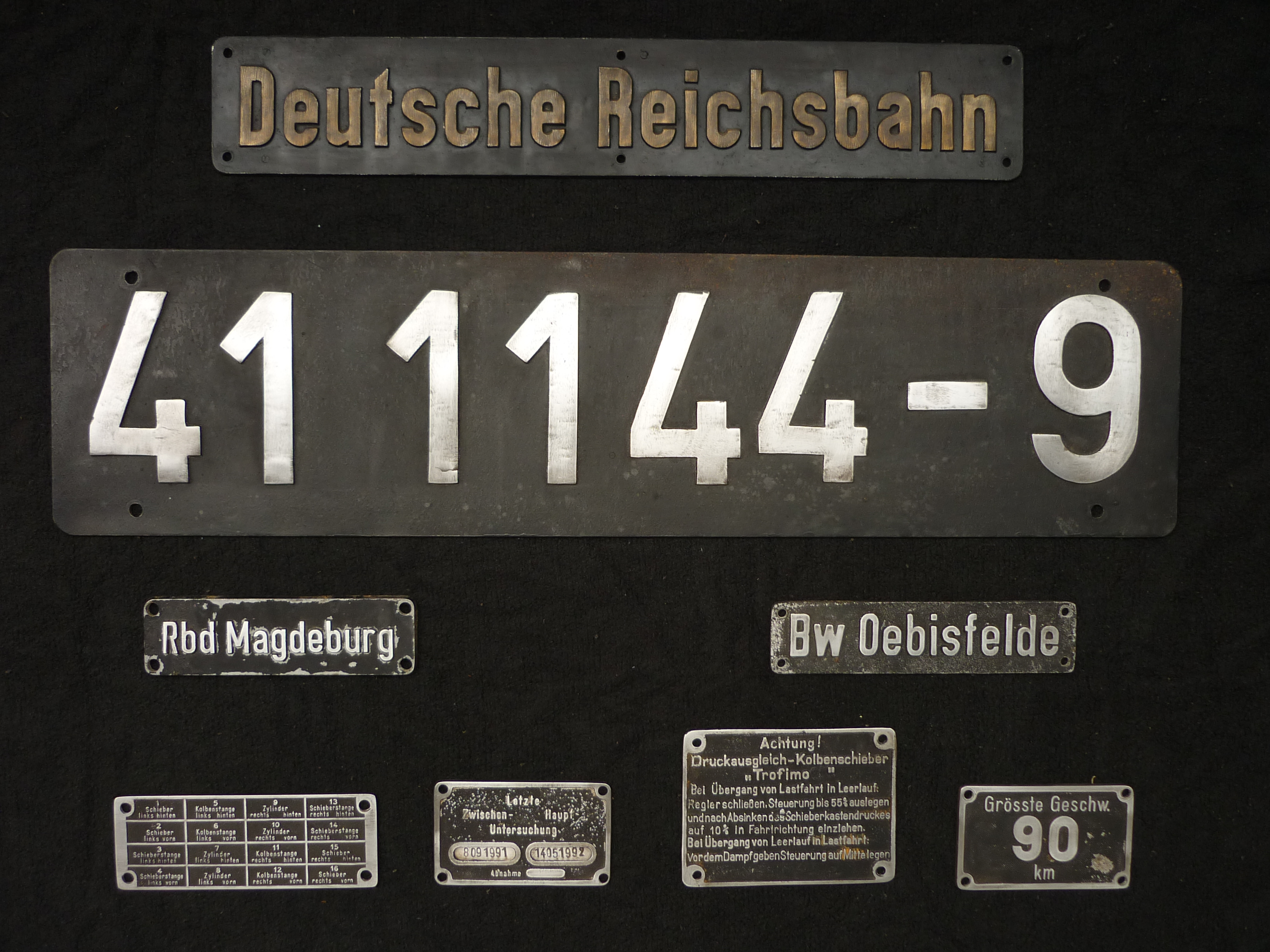
Locomotive plate, etc. of museum locomotive 41 1144-9.

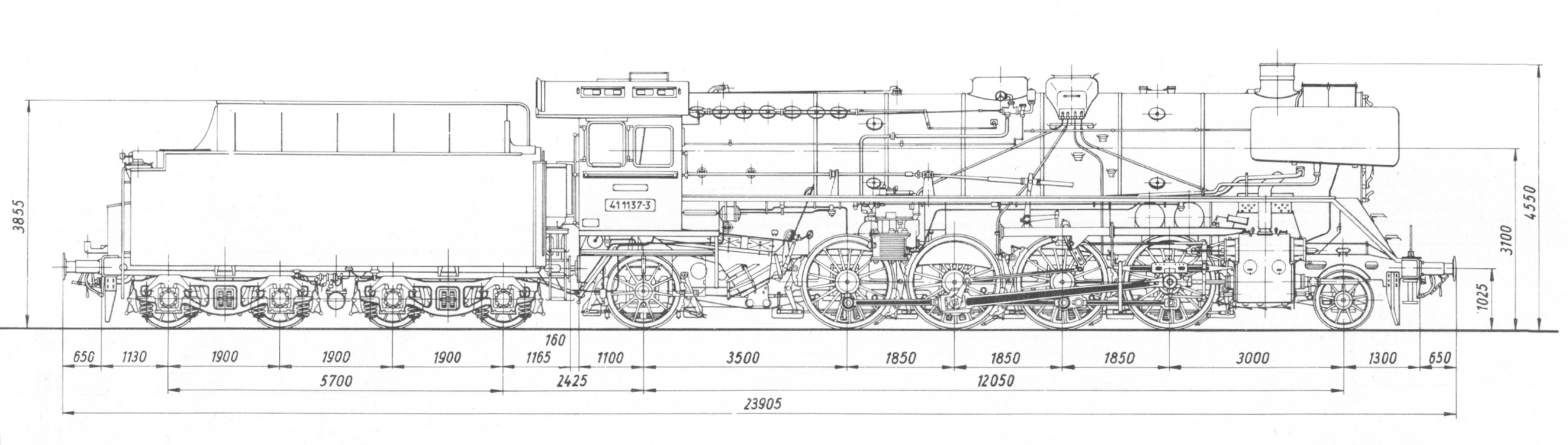
Section of a technical drawing of 41 1137-3 of the Deutsche Reichsbahn

== Video ==
41 018 climbing the Schiefe Ebene with 01 1066 as pusher locomotive (Video, 34,4 MB)

== See also ==
- List of DRG locomotives and railbuses
