= Munich Steam Locomotive Company =

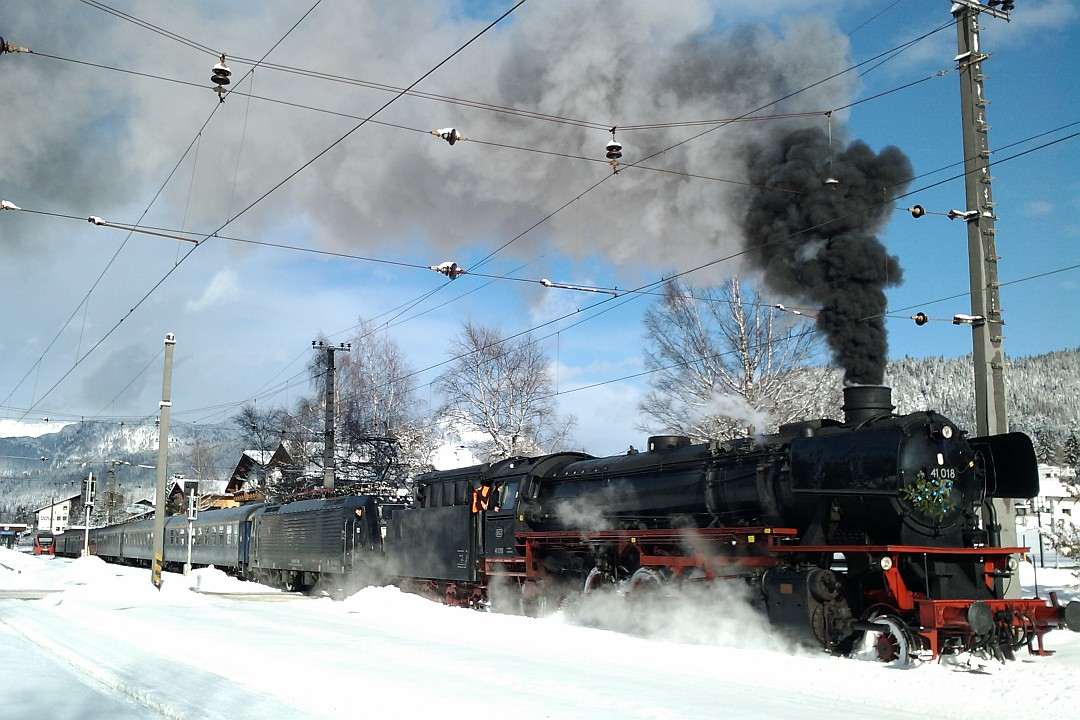
41 018 in Seefeld, Tirol, December 2011

The Munich Steam Locomotive Company (Dampflok-Gesellschaft München or DGM) is a charitable society based in Munich, Germany, whose aim is to preserve the oil-fired steam locomotive, number 41 018, as an operational locomotive.

== Society ==
The society was founded in 1976 and was originally called the Interessengemeinschaft 41 018. e.V. ('41 018 Interest Group') as the DRG Class 41 steam locomotive, no. 41 018, was purchased. This steam engine is registered as a technological monument in the state of Bavaria, Germany.

The society has 11 members who are joint owners of the locomotives and who have succeeded in keeping and operating locomotive 41 018 for more than 30 years. The steam engine is homed at the Augsburg Railway Park where the necessary work is also carried out.

== Locomotives ==
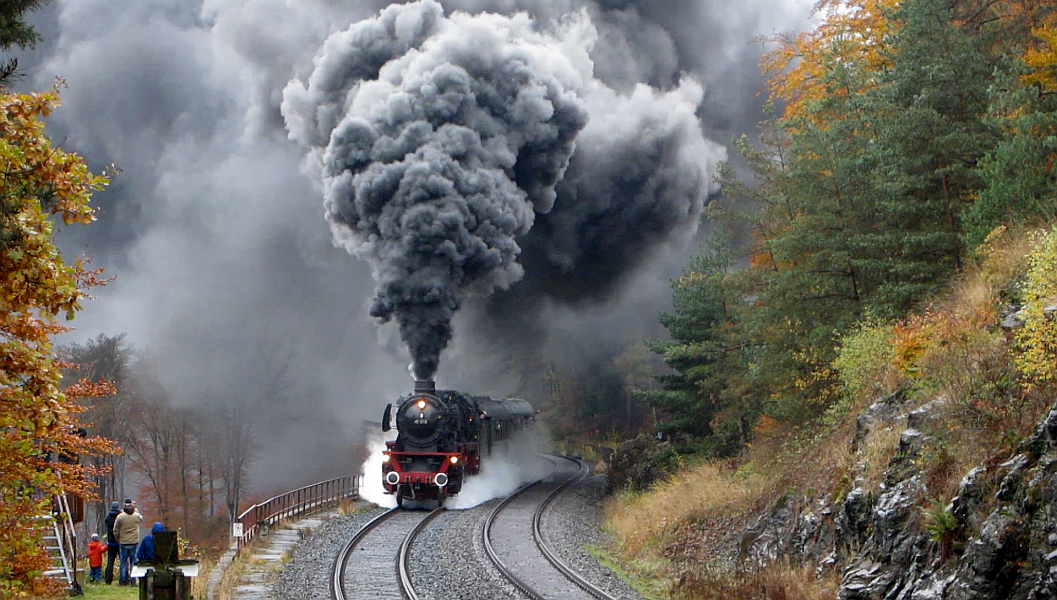
41 018 climbing the Schiefe Ebene

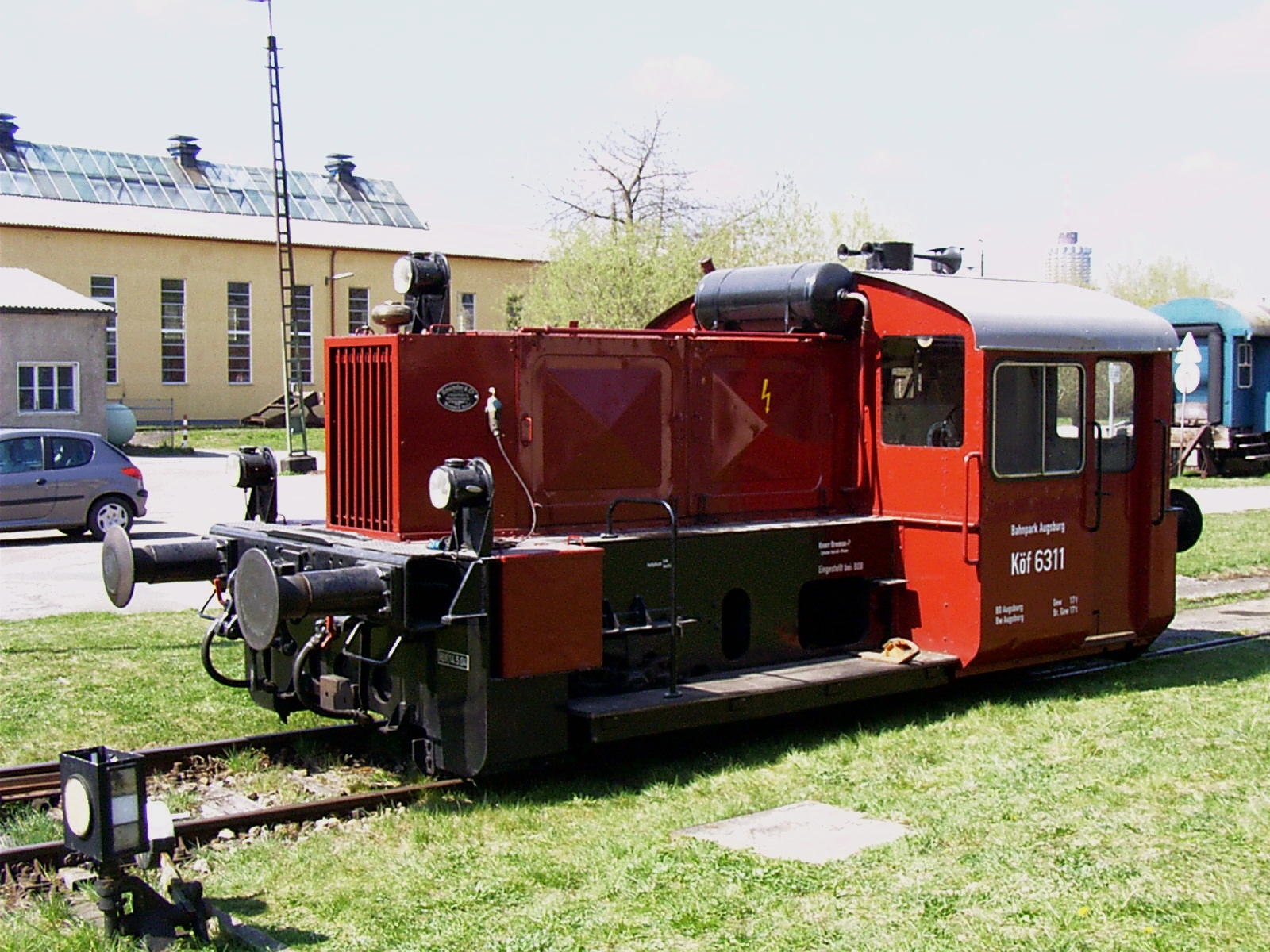
The Köf II 6311 shunter

The following locomotives are owned by the DGM and stored at the Augsburg Railway Park:

- Steam locomotive, no. 41 018, since 1976 − operational − oil-fired
- Steam locomotive, no. 41 364, since 1983 − rolling
- Steam locomotive, no. 44 606, since 2003 − rolling
- Köf II, no. 63 11, used for shunting duties

=== Purchase of 41 018 ===
No. 042 018-2 was bought, because she was the best of the 29 surviving Class 41s, having only had an L2/H2.8 overhaul in 1975. She had completed just die 66,000 kilometer since her overhaul and could therefore continue to be worked for a long time, both in terms of distance and time.

== Events ==
41 018 climbing the Schiefe Ebene with 01 1066 from Ulm Railway Friends as pusher locomotive, November 2016 (Video, 34,4 MB)

Special steam trains are hauled by 41 018 in cooperation with other organisations.
