= DB Class 66 =

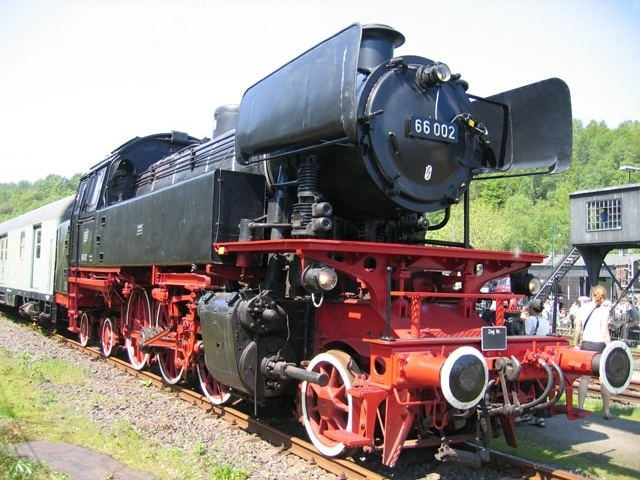
- Locomotive 66 002 in Bochum-Dahlhausen, May 2005
Type and origin
- Power type: Steam
- Builder: Henschel
- Serial number: 28923–28924
- Build date: 1955
- Total produced: 2
Specifications
- Configuration
  - Whyte: 2-6-4T
  - UIC: 1′C2′ h2t
  - German: Pt 36.16
- Gauge: 1,435 mm (4 ft 8 1/2 in)
- Leading dia.: 1,000 mm (3 ft 3 3/8 in)
- Driver dia.: 1,600 mm (5 ft 3 in)
- Trailing dia.: 850 mm (2 ft 9 1/2 in)
- Wheelbase
  - Axle spacing (Asymmetrical): 2,900 mm (9 ft 6 1/8 in) +; 1,850 mm (6 ft 7/8 in) +; 1,850 mm (6 ft 7/8 in) +; 2,250 mm (7 ft 4 5/8 in) +; 2,200 mm (7 ft 2 5/8 in) =
  - Engine: 11,050 mm (36 ft 3 in)
- Length
  - Over headstocks: 13,450 mm (44 ft 1 1/2 in)
  - Over buffers: 14,798 mm (48 ft 6 5/8 in)
- Height: 4,550 mm (14 ft 11 1/8 in)
- Axle load: 15.7 t (15.5 long tons; 17.3 short tons)
- Adhesive weight: 47.1 t (46.4 long tons; 51.9 short tons)
- Empty weight: 69.8 t (68.7 long tons; 76.9 short tons)
- Service weight: 93.9 t (92.4 long tons; 103.5 short tons)
- Fuel type: Coal
- Fuel capacity: 5 t (4.9 long tons; 5.5 short tons)
- Water cap.: 14.3 m^{3} (3,150 imp gal; 3,780 US gal)
- Firebox
  - Grate area: 1.96 m^{2} (21.1 sq ft)
- Boiler
  - Pitch: 3,185 mm (10 ft 5 3/8 in)
  - Tube plates: 3,600 mm (11 ft 9 3/4 in)
  - Small tubes: 44.5 mm (1 3/4 in), 70 off
  - Large tubes: 118 mm (4 5/8 in), 36 off
- Boiler pressure: 16 bar (16.3 kgf/cm^{2}; 232 psi)
- Heating surface
  - Firebox: 11.40 m^{2} (122.7 sq ft)
  - Tubes: 31.27 m^{2} (336.6 sq ft)
  - Flues: 44.79 m^{2} (482.1 sq ft)
  - Total surface: 87.46 m^{2} (941.4 sq ft)
- Superheater
  - Heating area: 45.13 m^{2} (485.8 sq ft)
- Cylinders: Two, outside
- Cylinder size: 470 mm × 660 mm (18 1/2 in × 26 in)
- Valve gear: Heusinger (Walschaerts)
Performance figures
- Maximum speed: 100 km/h (62 mph)
- Indicated power: 1,170 PS (861 kW; 1,150 hp)
Career
- Operators: Deutsche Bundesbahn
- Numbers: 66 001 – 66 002
- Retired: 1967–1968
- Preserved: 1
- Current owner: Bochum-Dahlhausen Railway Museum

The DB Class 66 (German: Baureihe 66) was a class of two Deutsche Bundesbahn (DB) steam locomotives designed for fast goods train and passenger train services on the main and branch lines of Deutsche Bundesbahn (DB), the national railway of the former West Germany.

== History ==
The Class 66 were one of several newly designed locomotive classes, the so-called Neubauloks, built for the DB after the Second World War. The 66s had a top speed of 100 km/h and an axle load of only 15 tonnes which made them ideally suited to such duties. They were intended to replace the former state railway (Länderbahn) locomotives of DRG classes 38.10 (ex-Prussian P 8), 78 (ex-Prussian T 18) and 93 (ex-Prussian T 14). However increasing competition from diesel locomotives meant that no more engines were built after the two prototypes, even though they fully met all expectations and were a very successful design. The Class 66 was the penultimate locomotive class to be built as part of the DB's Neubaulok construction programme.

== Design ==
The engines were equipped with a welded, high-performance boiler with a combustion chamber, roller bearings, a mixer preheater and a welded plate frame. Because great emphasis was placed on the working conditions for the engine driver and stoker, the Class 66 had a fully enclosed driver's cab, skylights, floor heating and upholstered seats with back rests. From autumn 1967 both engines were fitted equipment for working push-pull services.

Locomotive number 66 001 was retired in 1967 due to damage to its drive, and stored at Gießen; the second engine was retired in 1968.

== Preservation ==
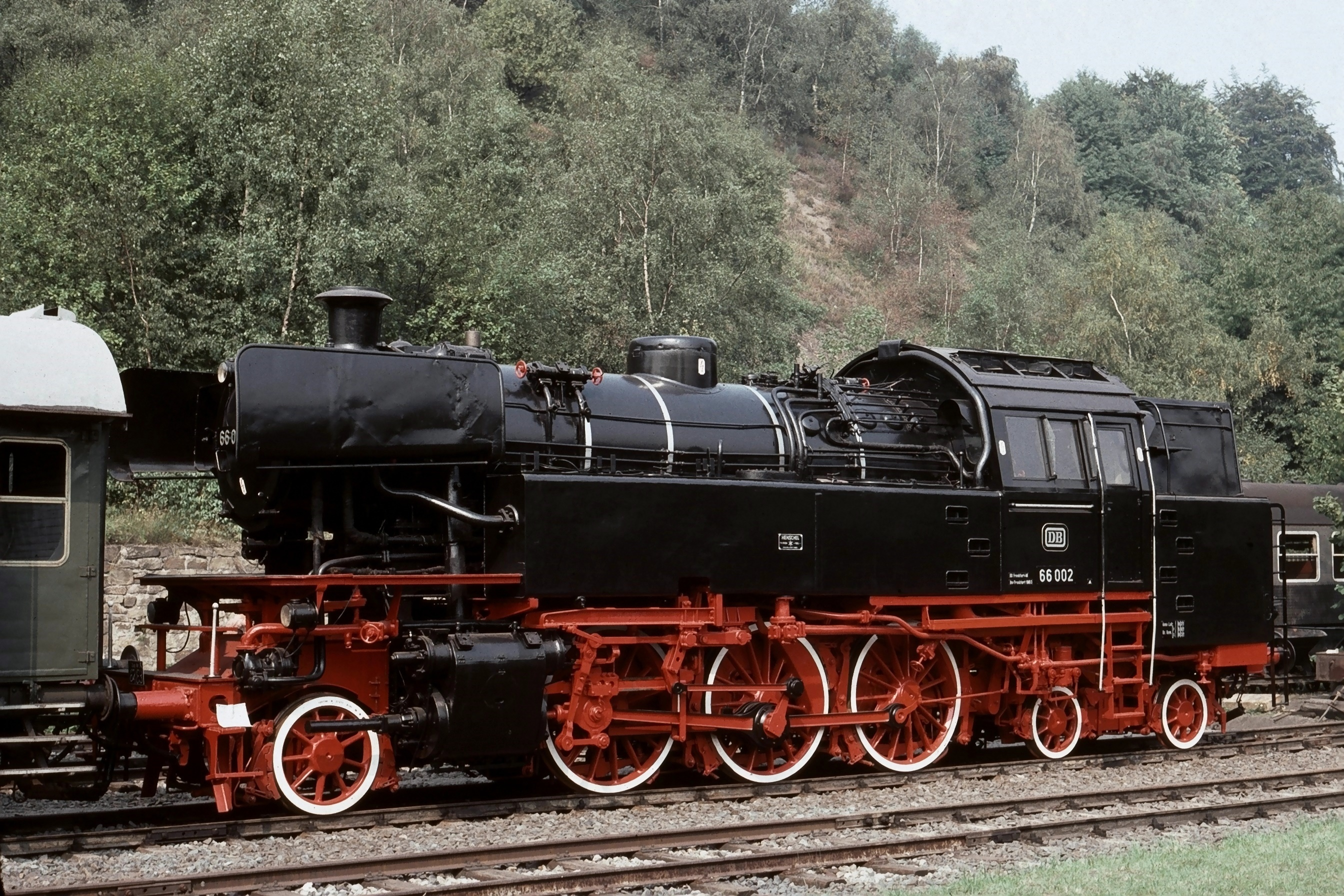
DB 66 002 at the Bochum-Dahlhausen Railway Museum (1982)

Locomotive 66 002 was bought after its retirement by the German Railway History Company (Deutsche Gesellschaft für Eisenbahngeschichte or DGEG) and is currently (2007) homed in Bochum-Dahlhausen Railway Museum.

== See also ==
- List of DB locomotives and railbuses
