= DB Class 65 =

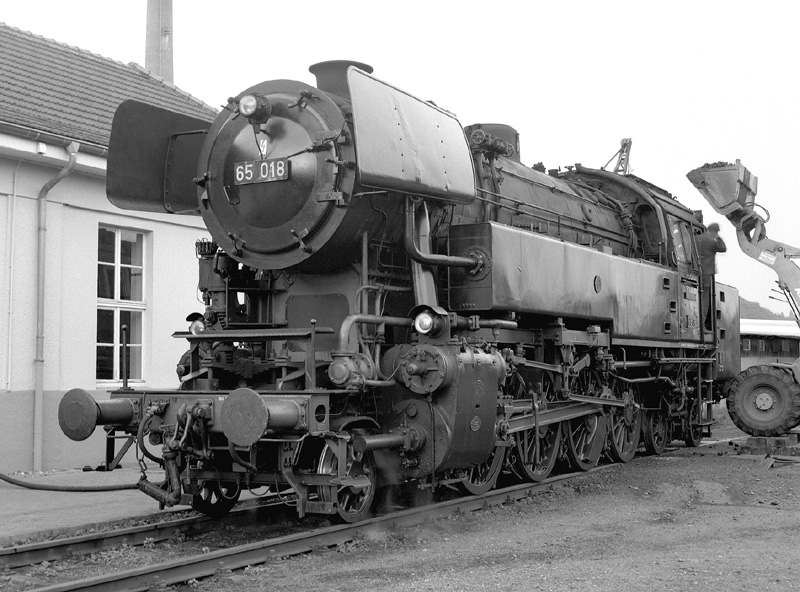
- 65 018 at the Bochum-Dahlhausen Railway Museum in 2006
Type and origin
- Power type: Steam
- Builder: Krauss-Maffei
- Serial number: 17661–17673, 17893–17897
- Build date: 1951–1956
- Total produced: 18
Specifications
- Configuration
  - Whyte: 2-8-4T
  - UIC: 1′D2′ h2t
  - German: Pt 47.17
- Gauge: 1,435 mm (4 ft 8 1/2 in)
- Leading dia.: 850 mm (2 ft 9 1/2 in)
- Driver dia.: 1,500 mm (4 ft 11 in)
- Trailing dia.: 850 mm (2 ft 9 1/2 in)
- Wheelbase
  - Axle spacing (Asymmetrical): 2,775 mm (9 ft 1 1/4 in) +; 1,750 mm (5 ft 8 7/8 in) +; 1,750 mm (5 ft 8 7/8 in) +; 1,750 mm (5 ft 8 7/8 in) +; 1,750 mm (5 ft 8 7/8 in) +; 2,200 mm (7 ft 2 5/8 in) =
  - Engine: 11,975 mm (39 ft 3 1/2 in)
- Length
  - Over headstocks: 14,175 mm (46 ft 6 1/8 in)
  - Over buffers: 15,475 mm (50 ft 9 1/4 in)
- Height: 4,550 mm (14 ft 11 1/8 in)
- Axle load: 16.9 t (16.6 long tons; 18.6 short tons)
- Adhesive weight: 67.6 t (66.5 long tons; 74.5 short tons)
- Empty weight: 81.2 t (79.9 long tons; 89.5 short tons)
- Service weight: 107.6 t (105.9 long tons; 118.6 short tons)
- Fuel type: Coal
- Fuel capacity: 4.8 t (4.7 long tons; 5.3 short tons)
- Water cap.: 14 m^{3} (3,080 imp gal; 3,700 US gal)
- Firebox
  - Grate area: 2.67 m^{2} (28.7 sq ft)
- Boiler
  - Pitch: 3,250 mm (10 ft 8 in)
  - Tube plates: 4,000 mm (13 ft 1 1/2 in)
  - Small tubes: 44.5 mm (1 3/4 in), 124 off
  - Large tubes: 118 mm (4 5/8 in), 46 off
- Boiler pressure: 14 bar (14.3 kgf/cm^{2}; 203 psi)
- Heating surface
  - Firebox: 14.80 m^{2} (159.3 sq ft)
  - Tubes: 61.55 m^{2} (662.5 sq ft)
  - Flues: 63.58 m^{2} (684.4 sq ft)
  - Total surface: 139.93 m^{2} (1,506.2 sq ft)
- Superheater
  - Heating area: 62.90 m^{2} (677.0 sq ft)
- Cylinders: Two, outside
- Cylinder size: 570 mm × 660 mm (22 7/16 in × 26 in)
- Valve type: Heusinger (Walschaerts)
- Loco brake: Knorr brake
Performance figures
- Maximum speed: 85 km/h (53 mph)
- Indicated power: 1,480 PS (1,090 kW; 1,460 hp)
Career
- Operators: Deutsche Bundesbahn
- Numbers: 65 001 – 65 018
- Retired: 1966–1973

The steam locomotives of DB Class 65 were newly designed, German, passenger train tank locomotives, built for the Deutsche Bundesbahn after the Second World War. They were intended for suburban and commuter trains serving German cities, where they were to replace Classes 78 and 93.5. As a result, they were allocated to the locomotive depots (Bahnbetriebswerke or BW) at Darmstadt, Düsseldorf and Letmathe. Between Düsseldorf and Essen they were even used on early S-Bahn services. And between Limburg/Lahn and Wiesbaden and in the area of Darmstadt they also hauled goods trains.

The firm of Krauss-Maffei initially delivered 13 engines in 1951 and a further 5 from 1955 to 1956. The first engine, with operating number 65 001, was retired as early as 1966.

All the vehicles were given a welded, high-performance boiler. Operating numbers 65 001 - 65 013 were equipped with a surface economizer. Numbers 65 014 - 65 018 were given a mixer preheater. Numbers 65 012 - 65 018 were equipped for push-pull services. So there were three different variants of these two-cylinder, superheated steam engines in service with the Bundesbahn.

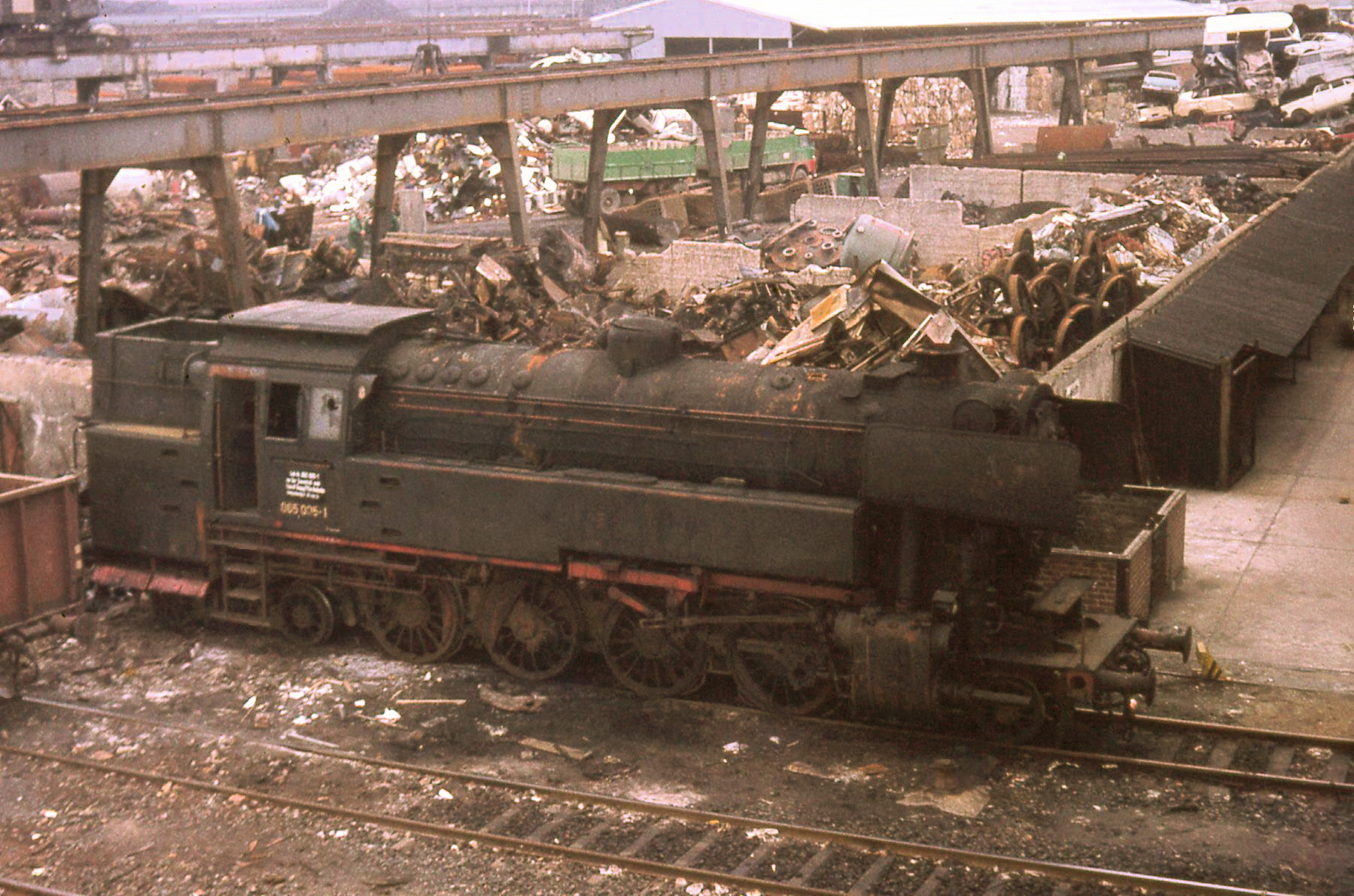
DB Neubaulok 065 005-1 ready for scrapping, Frankfurt-am-Main, 1970

Class 65 locomotives proved to be exceptionally reliable engines, but they could not be used universally, because their coal bunkers and water tanks were small. As a result, they could only be used for short-range goods traffic.

Locomotive 65 018 was given a special lightweight drive, which was later used on all the engines. This locomotive is the only representative of its class to have survived in working order and is owned by the Stoom Stichting Nederland society in the Netherlands, having been donated by a German railway museum in 1981. It was retired from Bw Aschaffenburg in 1972, the last one of these attractive locomotives to be paid off.

== See also ==
- Neubaulok
- DR Class 65.10
