= Neubaulokomotive =

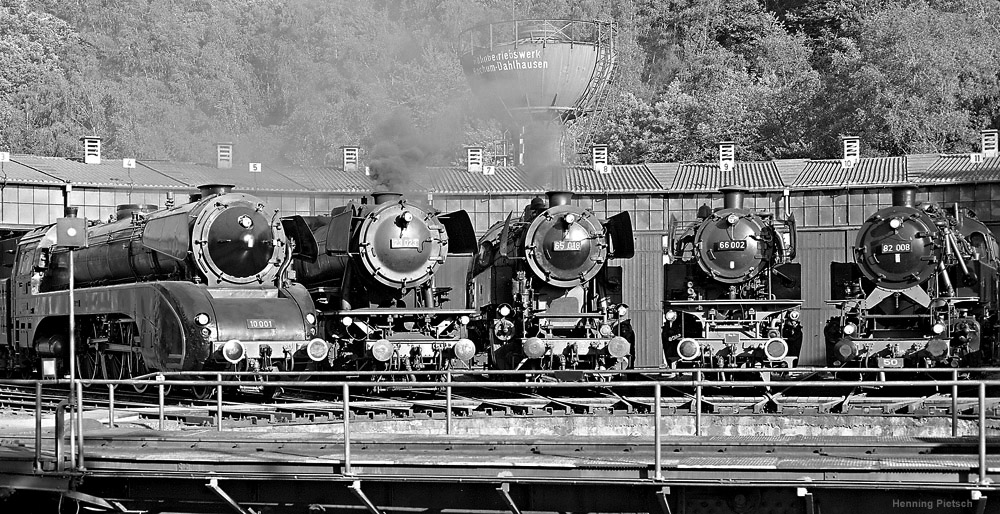
Representatives of all five DB Neubau steam locomotives

The German term Neubaulokomotive (German pronunciation: [ˈnɔʏbaʊlokomoˌtiːvə]) refers specifically to steam locomotives which were newly designed and built either for the Deutsche Bundesbahn in West Germany or the Deutsche Reichsbahn in East Germany after the Second World War.

== Concept ==
The term Neubaulokomotive or Neubaulok was chosen to distinguish these locomotives from the standard steam locomotives built by the pre-war Deutsche Reichsbahn in Germany, the so-called Einheitsdampflokomotiven or Einheitsloks.

The main differences were the welded plate frames instead of bar frames and more powerful boilers with combustion chambers. The locomotives newly developed by the Bundesbahn are visually different from their Reichsbahn and former state railway (Länderbahnen) counterparts, partially because of their silver-coloured boiler rings.

== DB locomotives ==
The DB Neubauloks were:

- Class 10
- Class 23
- Class 65
- Class 66
- Class 82

== DR locomotives ==
The Neubauloks of the former Deutsche Reichsbahn in the GDR were:

- Class 23.10
- Class 25.10
- Class 50.40
- Class 65.10
- Class 83.10
- Class 99.23-24
- Class 99.77-79

== See also ==
- List of Deutsche Bahn AG locomotives and railbuses
- List of East German Deutsche Reichsbahn locomotives and railbuses
- Einheitsdampflokomotive
- Kriegslokomotive
- Rekolokomotive
