= DR Class 65.10 =

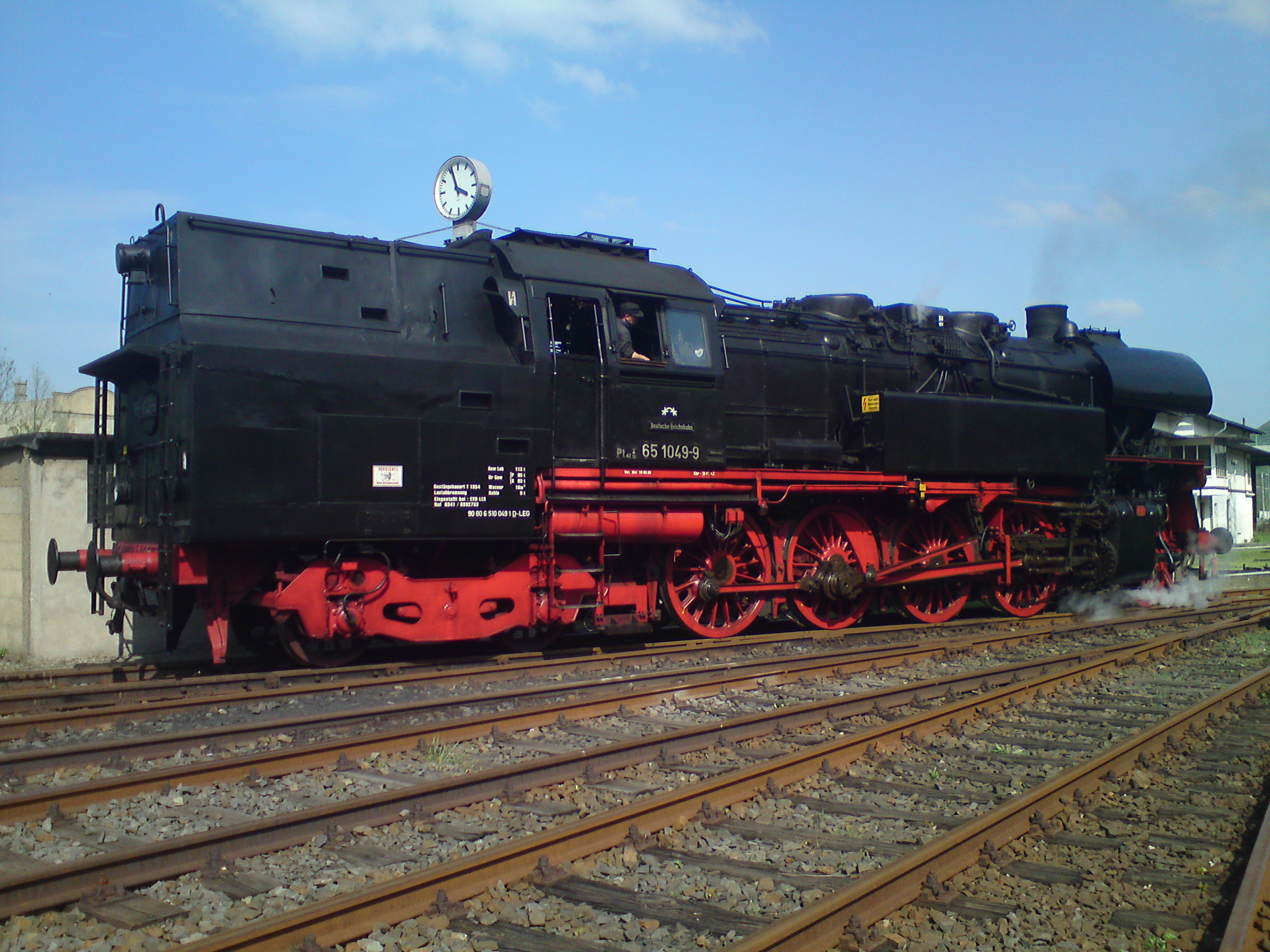
- DR 65 1049 in May 2010
Type and origin
- Power type: Steam
- Builder: LEW (Prototypes, 2); LKM (Production, 93)
- Build date: 1954–1957
- Total produced: 95
Specifications
- Configuration
  - Whyte: 2-8-4T
  - UIC: 1′D2′ h2t
  - German: Pt 47.17
- Driver: 3rd coupled axle
- Gauge: 1,435 mm (4 ft 8 1/2 in)
- Leading dia.: 1,000 mm (3 ft 3 3/8 in)
- Driver dia.: 1,600 mm (5 ft 3 in)
- Trailing dia.: 1,000 mm (3 ft 3 3/8 in)
- Wheelbase
  - Axle spacing (Asymmetrical): 2,950 mm (9 ft 8 1/8 in) +; 1,850 mm (6 ft 7/8 in) +; 1,850 mm (6 ft 7/8 in) +; 1,850 mm (6 ft 7/8 in) +; 2,600 mm (8 ft 6 3/8 in) +; 2,200 mm (7 ft 2 5/8 in) =
  - Engine: 13,300 mm (43 ft 7 5/8 in)
- Length
  - Over headstocks: 16,200 mm (53 ft 1 3/4 in)
  - Over buffers: 17,500 mm (57 ft 5 in)
- Height: 4,550 mm (14 ft 11 1/8 in)
- Axle load: 17.77 t (17.49 long tons; 19.59 short tons)
- Adhesive weight: 71.0 t (69.9 long tons; 78.3 short tons)
- Empty weight: 88.9 t (87.5 long tons; 98.0 short tons)
- Service weight: 121.7 t (119.8 long tons; 134.2 short tons)
- Fuel type: Coal
- Fuel capacity: 9 t (8.9 long tons; 9.9 short tons)
- Water cap.: 16 m^{3} (3,520 imp gal; 4,230 US gal)
- Firebox
  - Grate area: 3.45 m^{2} (37.1 sq ft)
- Boiler
  - Pitch: 3,250 mm (10 ft 8 in)
  - Tube plates: 4,200 mm (13 ft 9 3/8 in)
  - Small tubes: 44.5 mm (1 3/4 in), 158 off
  - Large tubes: 133 mm (5 1/4 in), 30 off
- Boiler pressure: 16 bar (16.3 kgf/cm^{2}; 232 psi)
- Heating surface
  - Firebox: 15.64 m^{2} (168.3 sq ft)
  - Tubes: 82.35 m^{2} (886.4 sq ft)
  - Flues: 49.45 m^{2} (532.3 sq ft)
  - Total surface: 147.44 m^{2} (1,587.0 sq ft)
- Superheater
  - Heating area: 47.39 m^{2} (510.1 sq ft)
- Cylinders: Two, outside
- Cylinder size: 600 mm × 660 mm (23 5/8 in × 26 in)
Performance figures
- Maximum speed: 90 km/h (56 mph) both directions
- Indicated power: 1,500 PS (1,100 kW; 1,480 hp)
Career
- Operators: Deutsche Reichsbahn (GDR); Leunawerke
- Number in class: DR: 88; Leuna: 7
- Numbers: DR: 65 1001 – 65 1088; Leunawerke: 41–45
- Retired: 1977

The DR Class 65.10 was a class of 2-8-4 passenger train tank engine operated by the East German Deutsche Reichsbahn (DR) for heavy suburban and commuter services.

== History ==
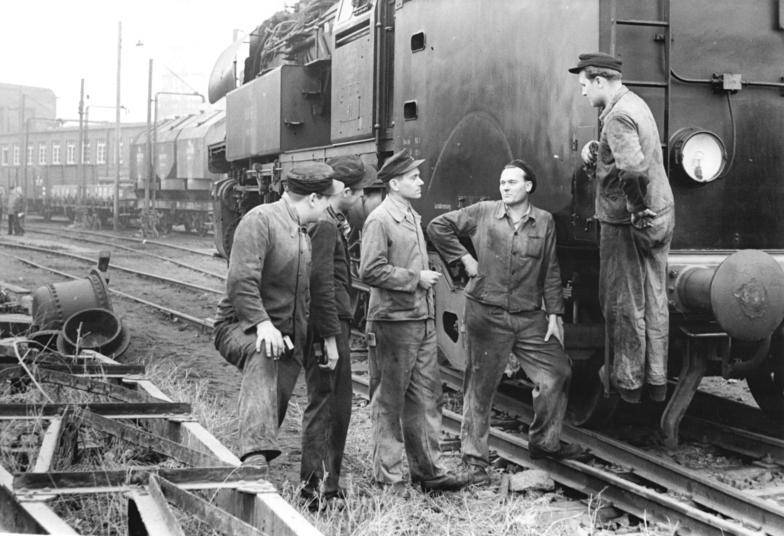
A class 65.10 locomotive in service of Leunawerke

Like the DB Class 65 built for the Deutsche Bundesbahn in West Germany, the DR Class 65.10 was intended by the Deutsche Reichsbahn (DR) in East Germany for commuter traffic on suburban railways. The DR procured a total of 88 examples of this class, and 7 more went to the Leuna chemical works.

The Class 65.10 was developed after the Second World War as a powerful tank locomotive that would replace engines of classes 74, 75, 78, 86, 93 and 94.

Numbers 1001 and 1002 were built at VEB Lokomotivbau Elektrotechnische Werke (LEW), formerly Borsig Lokomotiv Werke (AEG), Hennigsdorf, and the production models at VEB Lokomotivbau Karl Marx, (LKM, formerly Orenstein & Koppel) Babelsberg.

== Design ==
The vehicles had a welded locomotive frame, a welded boiler and mixer-preheater and large tanks in order to carry additional fuel (primarily brown coal briquettes). On the Class 65.10 the two axles of the rear bogie were housed in an outer frame unlike those of their DB Class 65 counterparts.

Number 65 1004 was the only German tank engine to be equipped with a Wendler coal dust firing system which, after modifications to the design, ran perfectly well. This modification was however reversed again in 1962. From 1967 the locos were fitted with Giesl chimneys.

== Use ==
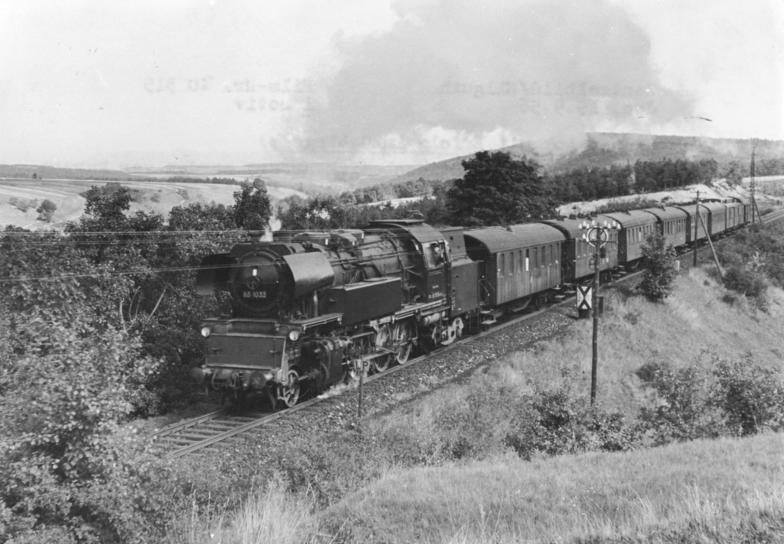
65 1033 on a line in the Thuringian Forest

The 65.10s were stationed all over East Germany, except in the DR's northern locomotive depots (Bahnbetriebswerke or Bw), and in the 1960s were preferred as the motive power for commuter traffic with double-decker trains as well as on push-pull services. For the latter, engines 65 1009; 1015; 1017; 1025; 1026; 1034; 1058; 1063 and 1081 were fitted with push-pull equipment. The picture changed with the widespread appearance of the DR Class 118 diesels. The 65.10 was also used for goods train duties.

== Preserved locomotives ==
Of the total of 95 examples produced, just three engines remain:

- 65 1008 is in the former Bw Pasewalk in the care of a regional railway society.
- 65 1049 is in Arnstadt (at present homed at Bw Chemnitz-Hilbersdorf).
- 65 1057 is owned by the Berliner Eisenbahnfreunde (BEF).

== See also ==
- List of East German Deutsche Reichsbahn locomotives and railbuses
- Neubaulok
- DB Class 65
