= Class 78 =

Class 78 may refer to:

- DRG Class 78, a German 4-6-4T tank locomotive class operated by the Deutsche Reichsbahn and Deutsche Bundesbahn comprising:
  - Class 78.0-5: Prussian T 18, Württemberg T 18
  - Class 78.6: BBÖ 729
  - DB Class 78.10: DB rebuild from the DRG Class 38.10-40
