= South German Railway Museum =

Museum in Heilbronn, Baden-Württemberg, Germany

Coordinates: 49°08′23″N 9°11′34″E

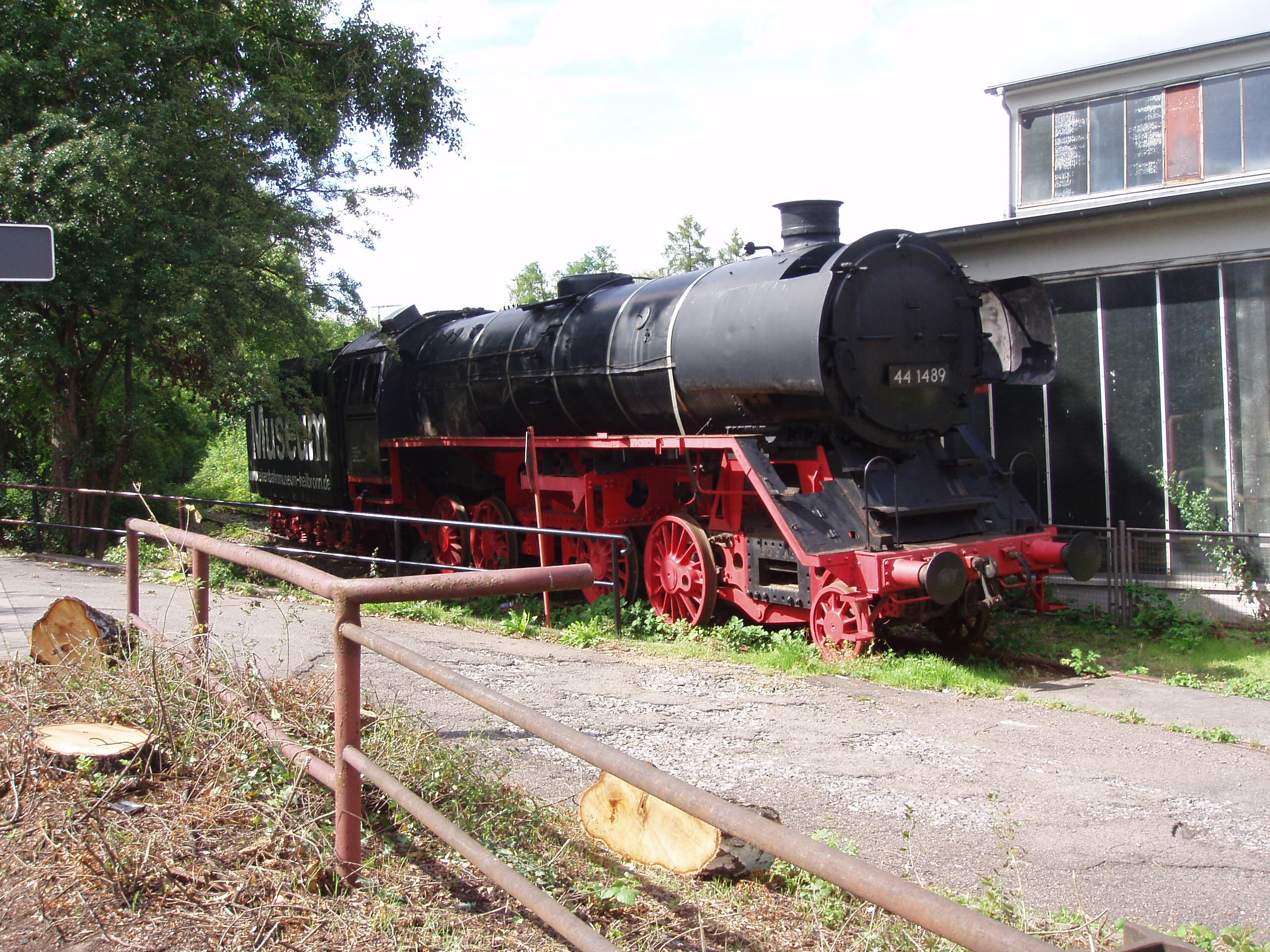
The entrance

South German Railway Museum, Heilbronn, Baden-Württemberg

The South German Railway Museum (Süddeutsches Eisenbahnmuseum Heilbronn or SEH) is a railway museum at Heilbronn in the state of Baden-Württemberg in southwestern Germany. It was founded in 1998.

== Aims ==
The museum has the following aims:
1. To preserve the site of the former Heilbronn locomotive depot, part of which is under historic building protection.
2. To preserve historical railway vehicles and their associated infrastructure and to display them to the general public.
The members of the board of trustees work for the museum as volunteers.

== Site and description of the museums ==
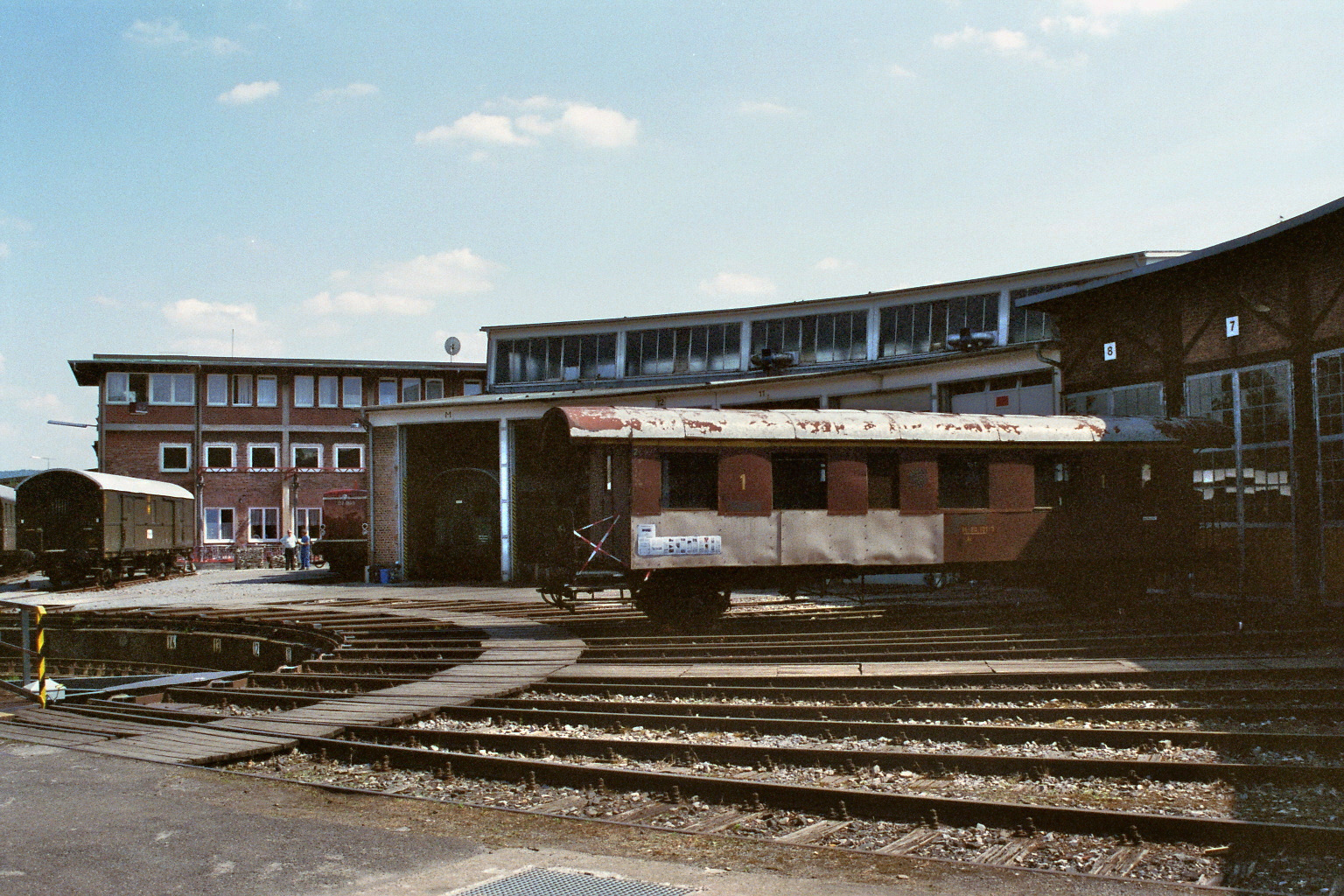
The site of the SEH: On the left is the former Lokleitung, the wagon shed is joined on behind it. In the centre is the area of the roundhouse under construction, next to it on the right is the protected historical area from the time of the Royal Württemberg State Railways

The museum is located in the former Deutsche Bundesbahn locomotive depot at Heilbronn in the Böckingen district of the town. The depot was opened in 1893 by the Royal Württemberg State Railways (Königlich Württembergische Staats-Eisenbahnen or K.W.St.E.), and owned in succession by the Deutsche Reichsbahn, Deutsche Bundesbahn and Deutsche Bahn, before being taken over in 2000 by the museum's board of trustees. The museum has about 80 exhibits (wagons and locomotives). On the site is a locomotive roundhouse with a working turntable, as well as a large wagon shed. Steam and diesel engines can be serviced and looked after.
Members of the museum restore locomotives and wagons from the period 1895 to the 1950s. In addition, the roundhouse opened in 1893 is being refurbished. This is the only remaining roundhouse from the time of the Royal Württemberg State Railways that can still be seen in its original state.

== Museum vehicles ==
Here is a brief overview of the locomotives and wagons owned by the museum. A detailed description of these exhibits may be found on the museum website.

=== Steam locomotives ===
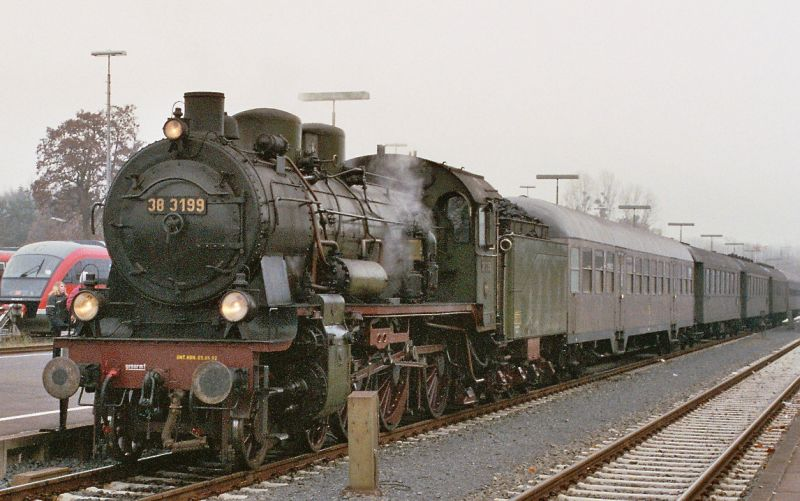
The museum's Prussian P 8 locomotive on the 'Santa Special' heading for the Christmas market at Michelstadt on 11 December 2004, taken when halted in Miltenberg.

The steam locomotives which can be seen include the following:

- Steam locomotive Prussian P 8
- Steam locomotive DRG Class 01.10
- Steam locomotive DB Class 23
- Steam locomotive DRG Class 44
- Steam locomotive DRB Class 50
- Steam locomotive DR Class 52.80
- Steam locomotive DRG Class 64 "Bubikopf"
- Steam locomotive DRG Class 80
- Steam locomotive DRG Class 86
- Express locomotive (French) SNCF Class 231 K
- Several industrial locomotives.

The star of the show is undoubtedly the Prussian P 8 steam locomotive, number 38 3199, bought back from Romania and restored to working condition. In addition, numbers 86 457 and 23 105, which were victims of the great fire at Nuremberg-Gostenhof on 17 October 2005, are housed here.

Only the carcasses remain on many of the other valuable steam locomotives, but they are being gradually rebuilt into visual exhibits.

As well as the SEH museum's own locomotives, express train steam engines belonging to the Ulm Railway Friends are also stationed here.

=== Diesel locomotives ===
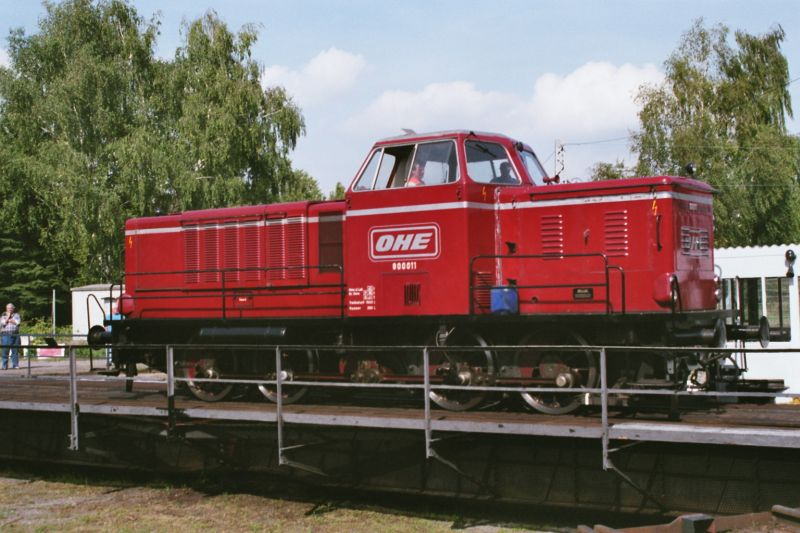
The MaK 800 D on the museum turntable during the Class 01 visit on 11 September 2004.

Amongst the diesel locomotives on display are the DB Class V 200.1 (later Class 221), DB Class V 60 (later Class 260) and a MaK 800 D, which is similar to the DB Class V 65 (later Class 265). The robust MaK, side-rod driven locomotive is operational and is used for transportation and industrial railway duties across the length and breadth of Germany.

=== Electric locomotives ===
The SEH also has a DB Class E 50 and a DRG Class E 63 locomotive in its care and protection.

=== Wagons ===
There is a collection of valuable Prussian and Saxon passenger coaches, that have still to be refurbished because, before they had been bought by the SEH, they had stood in the open for many years and fell into disrepair as a result. A lot of time and money will be required to restore them.

In the wagon shed a historical saloon coach belonging to the last crown prince of Prussia is on display.

Railway vehicles in the state they were delivered to the SEH

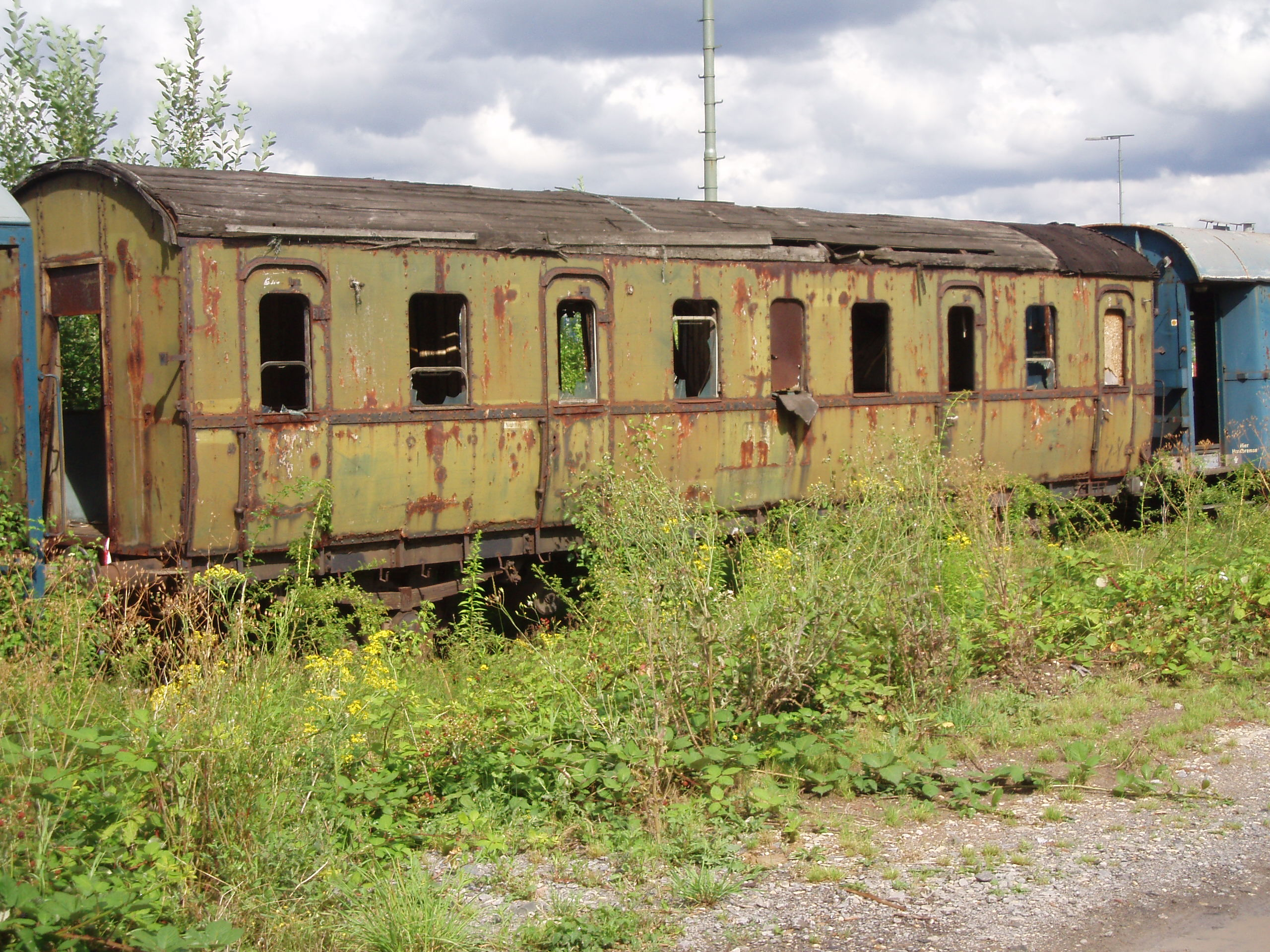

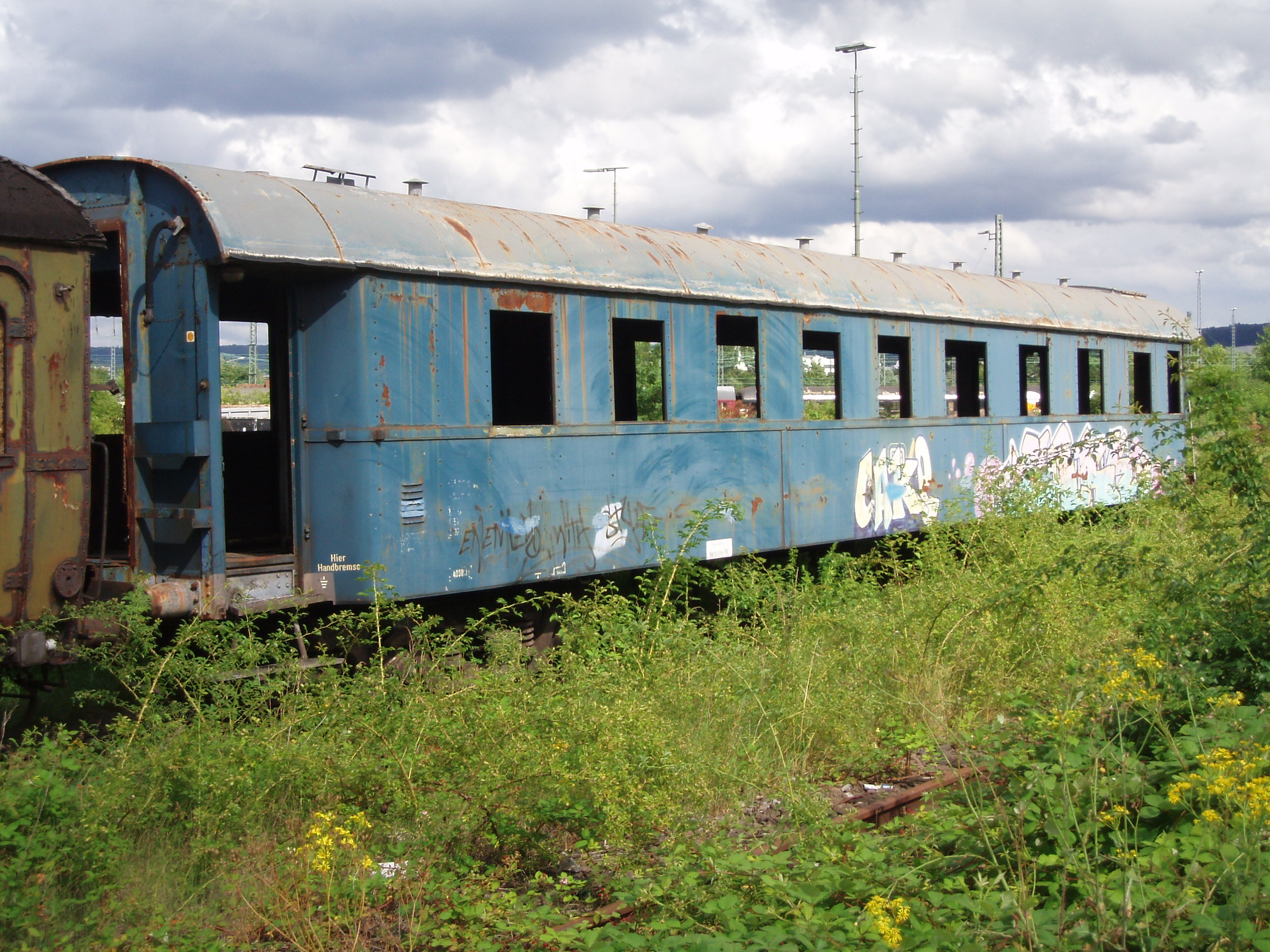

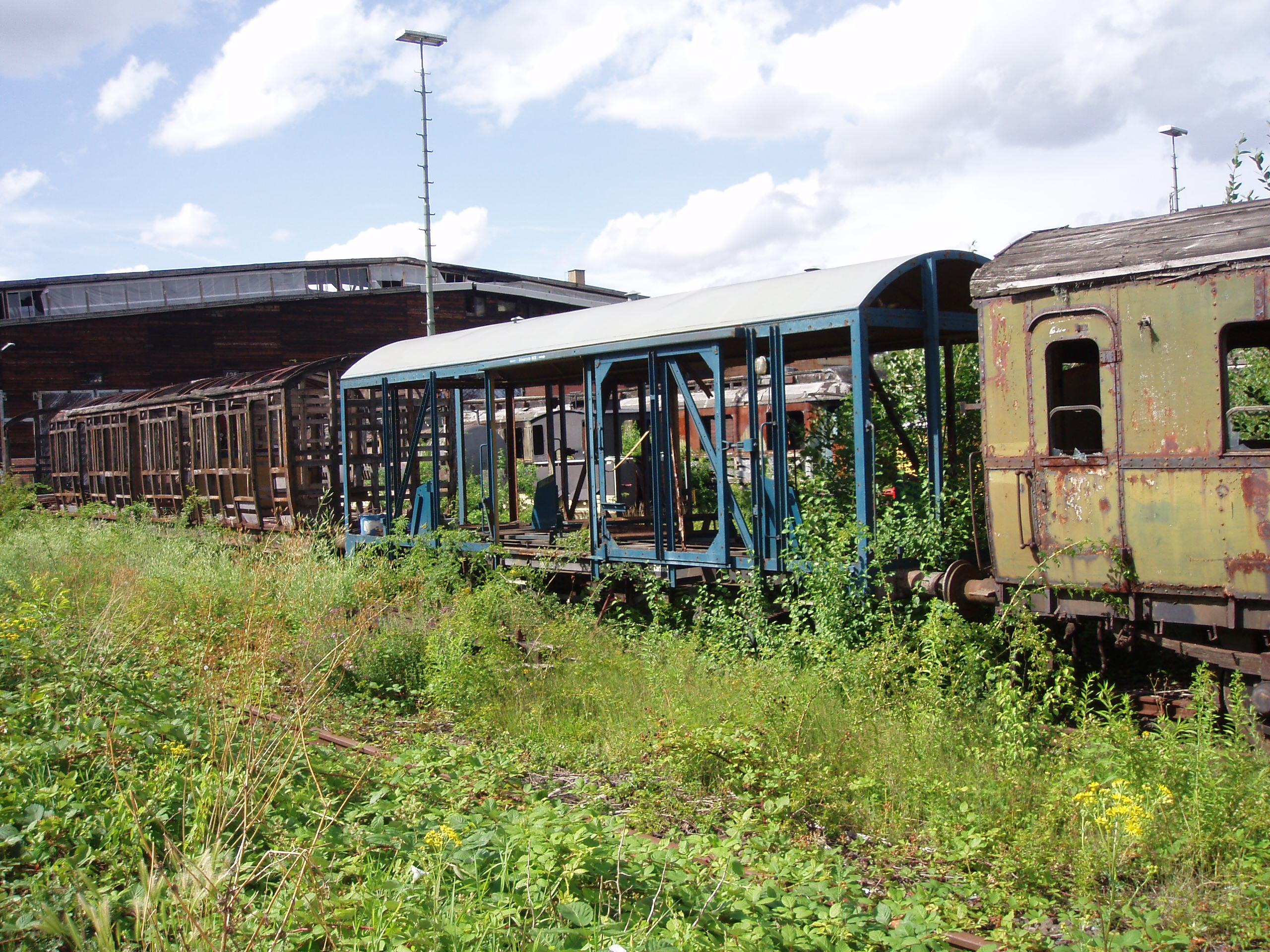

== Model railway ==
An I-gauge model railway layout may also be viewed at the museum.

== Opening times and annual events ==
The museum is open to visitors on weekends and public holidays between March and October. Larger events include the steam days in May and the steam engine festival in September that is also combined with a meeting of I-gauge model railway enthusiasts. At the latter, many working layouts and modules are displayed or presented and there are also I-gauge items for sale.
