= DB Class 23 =

Class of West German 2-6-2 locomotives

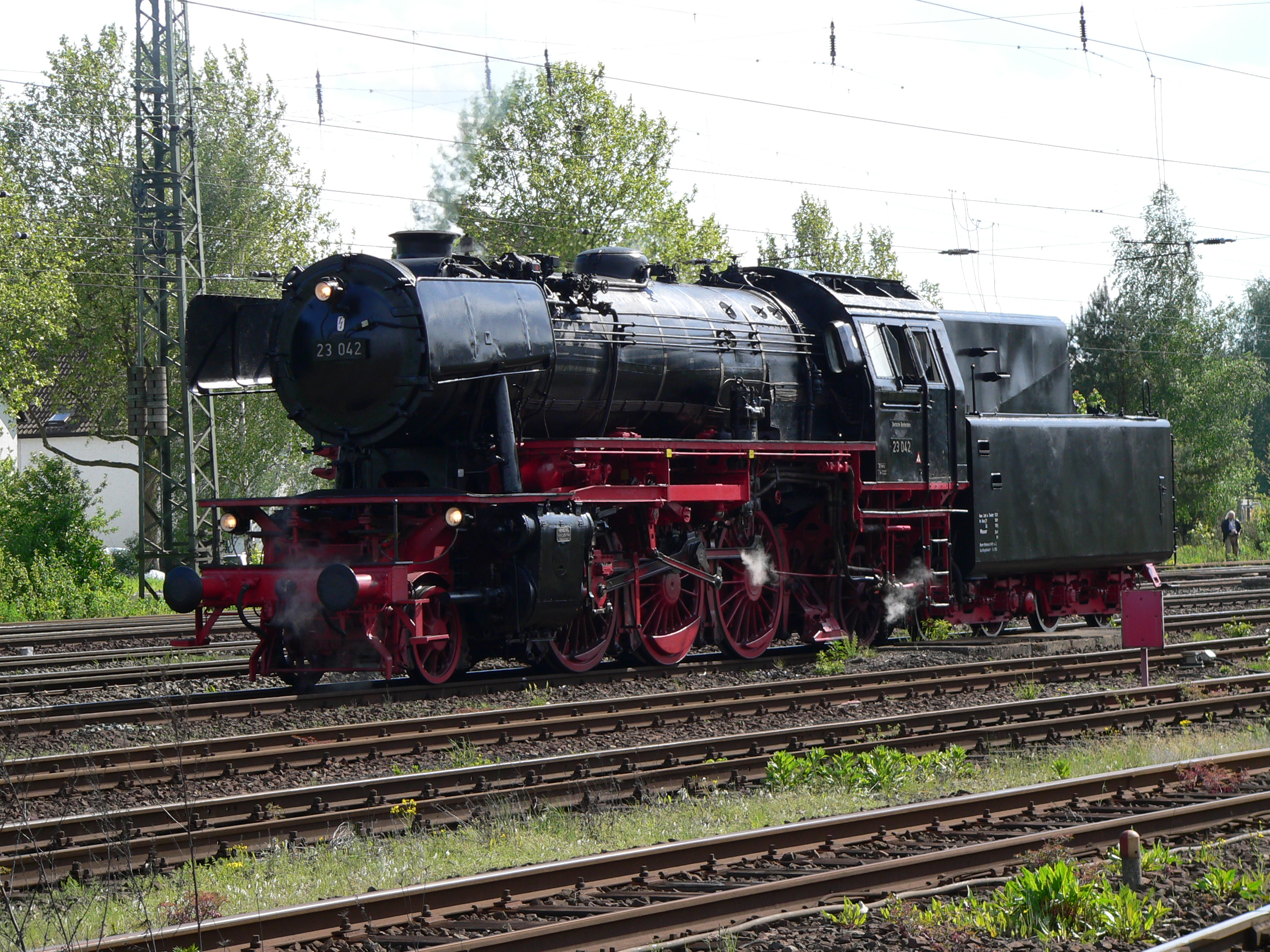
- 23 042 in Darmstadt-Kranichstein, May 2005
Type and origin
- Power type: Steam
- Builder: Henschel & Sohn (29); Arnold Jung Lokomotivfabrik (51); Krupp (21); Maschinenfabrik Esslingen (4)
- Build date: 1950–1959
- Total produced: 105
Specifications
- Configuration
  - Whyte: 2-6-2
  - UIC: 1′C1′ h2
  - German: P 35.18
- Gauge: 1,435 mm (4 ft 8 1/2 in)
- Leading dia.: 1,000 mm (3 ft 3 3/8 in)
- Driver dia.: 1,750 mm (5 ft 8 7/8 in)
- Trailing dia.: 1,250 mm (4 ft 1 1/4 in)
- Tender wheels: 1,000 mm (3 ft 3 3/8 in)
- Wheelbase
  - Axle spacing (Asymmetrical): 2,950 mm (9 ft 8 1/8 in) +; 2,000 mm (6 ft 6 3/4 in) +; 2,000 mm (6 ft 6 3/4 in) +; 2,950 mm (9 ft 8 1/8 in) =
  - Engine: 9,900 mm (32 ft 5 3/4 in)
  - Tender: 1,900 mm (6 ft 2 3/4 in) +; 1,900 mm (6 ft 2 3/4 in) +; 1,900 mm (6 ft 2 3/4 in) =; 5,700 mm (18 ft 8 3/8 in)
  - incl. tender: 17,625 mm (57 ft 9 7/8 in)
- Length
  - Over buffers: 21,325 mm (69 ft 11 5/8 in)
- Height: 4,550 mm (14 ft 11 1/8 in)
- Axle load: 18.7 tonnes (18.4 long tons; 20.6 short tons)
- Adhesive weight: 56.0 tonnes (55.1 long tons; 61.7 short tons)
- Empty weight: 74.6 tonnes (73.4 long tons; 82.2 short tons)
- Service weight: 82.8 tonnes (81.5 long tons; 91.3 short tons)
- Tender type: 2′2′ T 31
- Fuel type: Coal
- Fuel capacity: 8 tonnes (7.9 long tons; 8.8 short tons)
- Water cap.: 31 m^{3} (6,800 imp gal; 8,200 US gal)
- Firebox
  - Grate area: 3.11 m^{2} (33.5 sq ft)
- Boiler
  - Pitch: 3,250 mm (10 ft 8 in)
  - Tube plates: 4,000 mm (13 ft 1 1/2 in)
  - Small tubes: 44.5 mm (1 3/4 in), 130 off
  - Large tubes: 118 mm (4 5/8 in), 54 off
- Boiler pressure: 16 bar (16.3 kg/cm^{2}; 232 psi)
- Heating surface
  - Firebox: 17.10 m^{2} (184.1 sq ft)
  - Tubes: 64.53 m^{2} (694.6 sq ft)
  - Flues: 74.65 m^{2} (803.5 sq ft)
  - Total surface: 156.28 m^{2} (1,682.2 sq ft)
- Superheater
  - Heating area: 73.80 m^{2} (794.4 sq ft)
- Cylinders: Two, outside
- Cylinder size: 550 mm × 660 mm (21 5/8 in × 26 in)
- Valve gear: Heusinger (Walschaerts)
Performance figures
- Maximum speed: forwards: 110 km/h (68 mph); backwards: 85 km/h (53 mph)
Career
- Operators: Deutsche Bundesbahn
- Numbers: 23 001 – 23 105
- Retired: by 1976

The steam locomotives of Class 23 were German passenger train locomotives developed in the 1950s for the Deutsche Bundesbahn. They had a 2-6-2 wheel arrangement and were equipped with Class 2'2' T 31 tenders. They were designed to replace the once ubiquitous Prussian P 8 engines that had been built between 1908 and 1924 and, in their day, were the most numerous post-war replacement class.

== Manufacture and Design ==
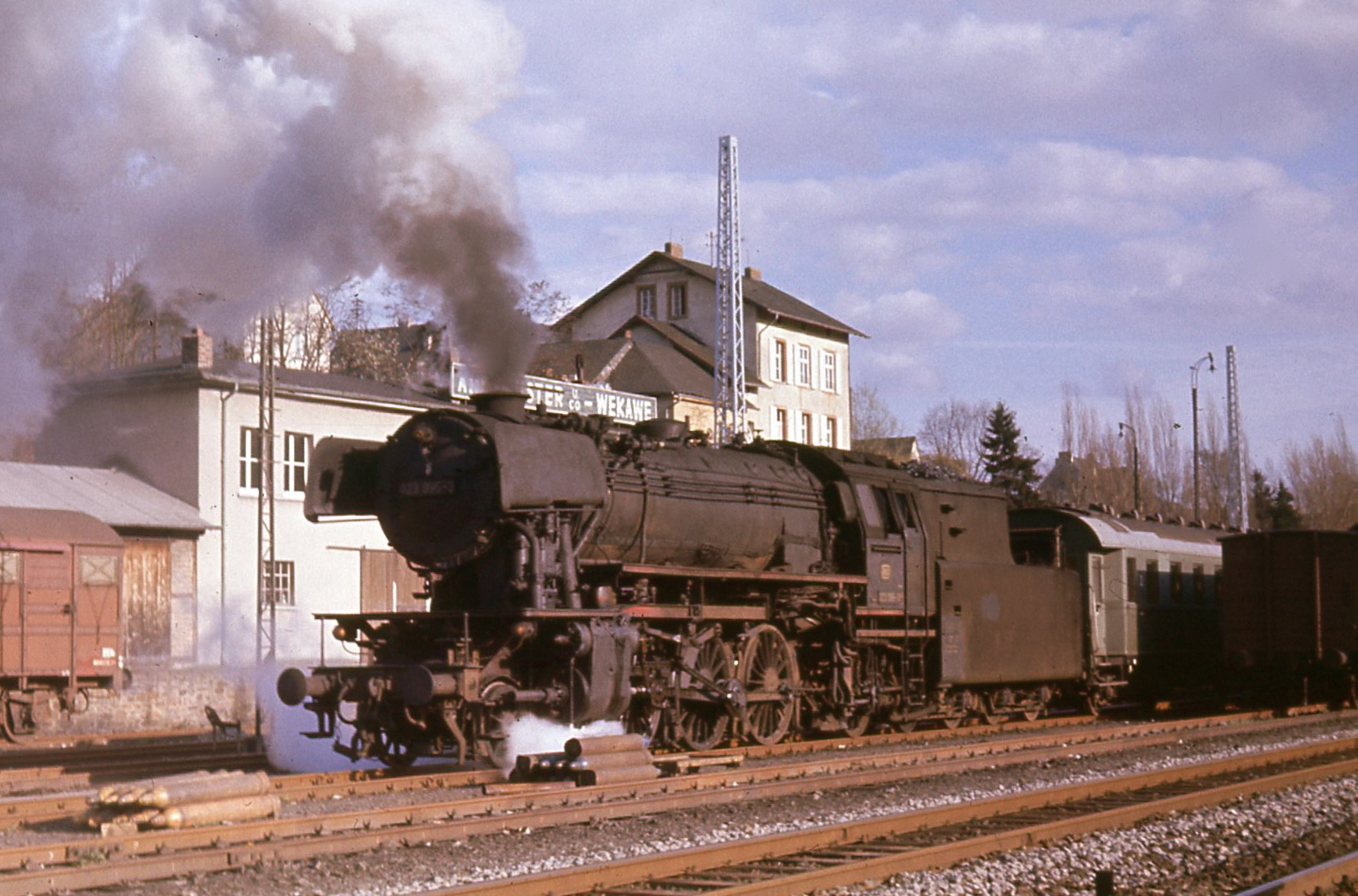
A class 023 working in the Moselle Valley, Easter 1972

From 1950, 105 examples of this newly designed class were manufactured for medium passenger train and light express train services. They had welded locomotive frames, boilers and tenders together with all the latest refinements of German practice. These included a superheated multiple-valve regulator and central lubrication of the least accessible parts of the running gear. Engines up to operating number 023 had Knorr surface preheaters and journal bearings. Locomotives with serial numbers 024 and 025, as well as those from 053 onwards were equipped with roller bearings for the axles and drive as well as mixer-preheaters. A small number of vehicles were given Heinl preheaters and several were equipped for push-pull train operations.

== Last new steam locomotive in West Germany ==
Locomotive number 23 105, built by Arnold Jung Lokomotivfabrik and taken into service by the DB in December 1959, was the last steam engine to enter service in the Federal Republic of Germany. After its retirement it was stabled at the Nuremberg Transport Museum where it was severely damaged by the great fire in the locomotive shed on 17 October 2005.

== Reclassification and retirement ==
On the introduction of the new DB numbering scheme on 1 January 1968 the class was redesignated as Class 023. The last few locomotives were retired in 1976 at Crailsheim locomotive depot (Bahnbetriebswerk or Bw).

== Preserved locomotives ==
The following engines had been preserved as at September 2006:

- 23 019 in the German Steam Locomotive Museum (Deutsche Dampflokomotiv-Museum) at Neuenmarkt-Wirsberg in Upper Franconia, Bavaria, Germany.
- 23 023 at the Stoom Stichting Nederland in Rotterdam, Netherlands (operational since March 2019).
- 23 029 as a monument in front of the technical school in Aalen, Germany.
- 23 042 at the Darmstadt-Kranichstein Railway Museum in Hesse, Germany (operational).
- 23 058 with EUROVAPOR in Basel-Haltingen, Switzerland, is looked after by Club 41 073 e. V. (operational). Rented to the Friese Stoomtrein Maatschappij (FStM) in the Netherlands.
- 23 071 with the Veluwsche Stoomtrein Maatschappij in Apeldoorn, Netherlands (operational).
- 23 076 also with the Veluwsche Stoomtrein Maatschappij in Apeldoorn (operational since June 2007).
- 23 105 in the South German Railway Museum at Heilbronn (Süddeutsches Eisenbahnmuseum Heilbronn) in Baden-Württemberg, Germany (on loan from the DB until 2016).
Steam special with locomotive 23 042 on 13 May 2007

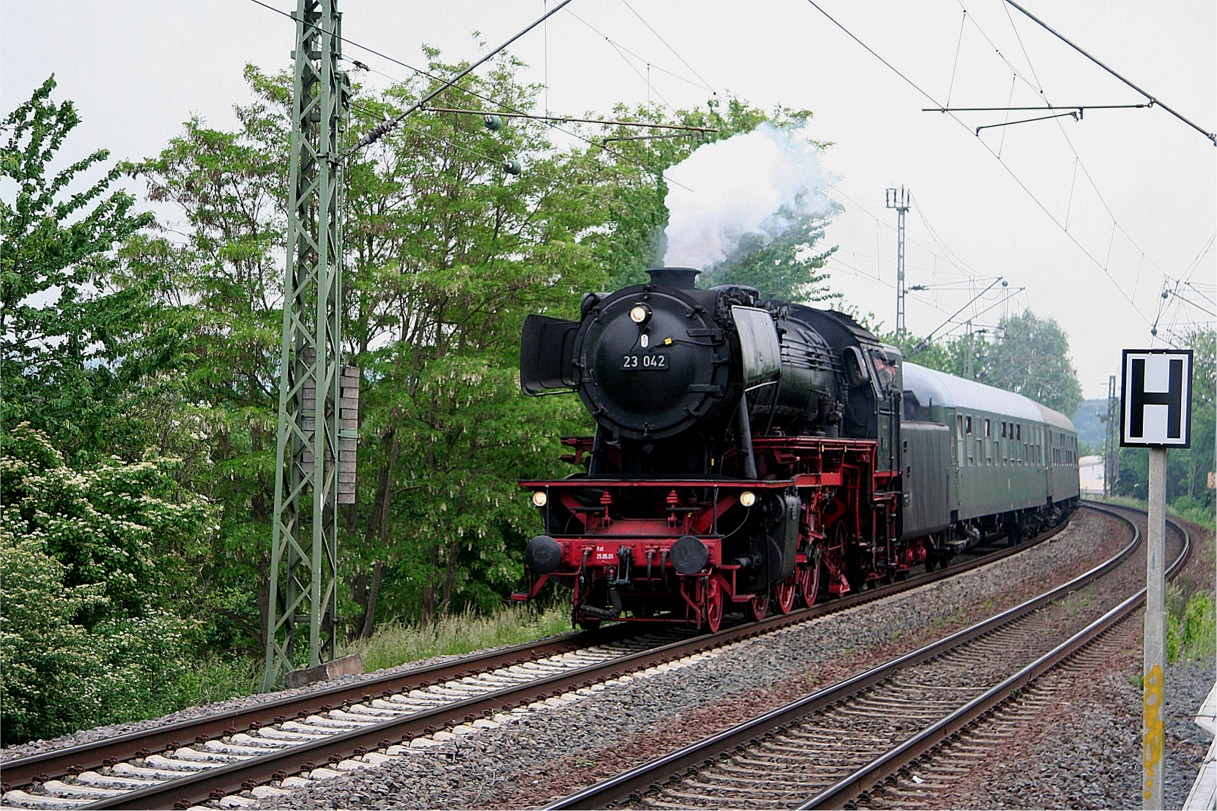
On the Koblenz – Neuwied line

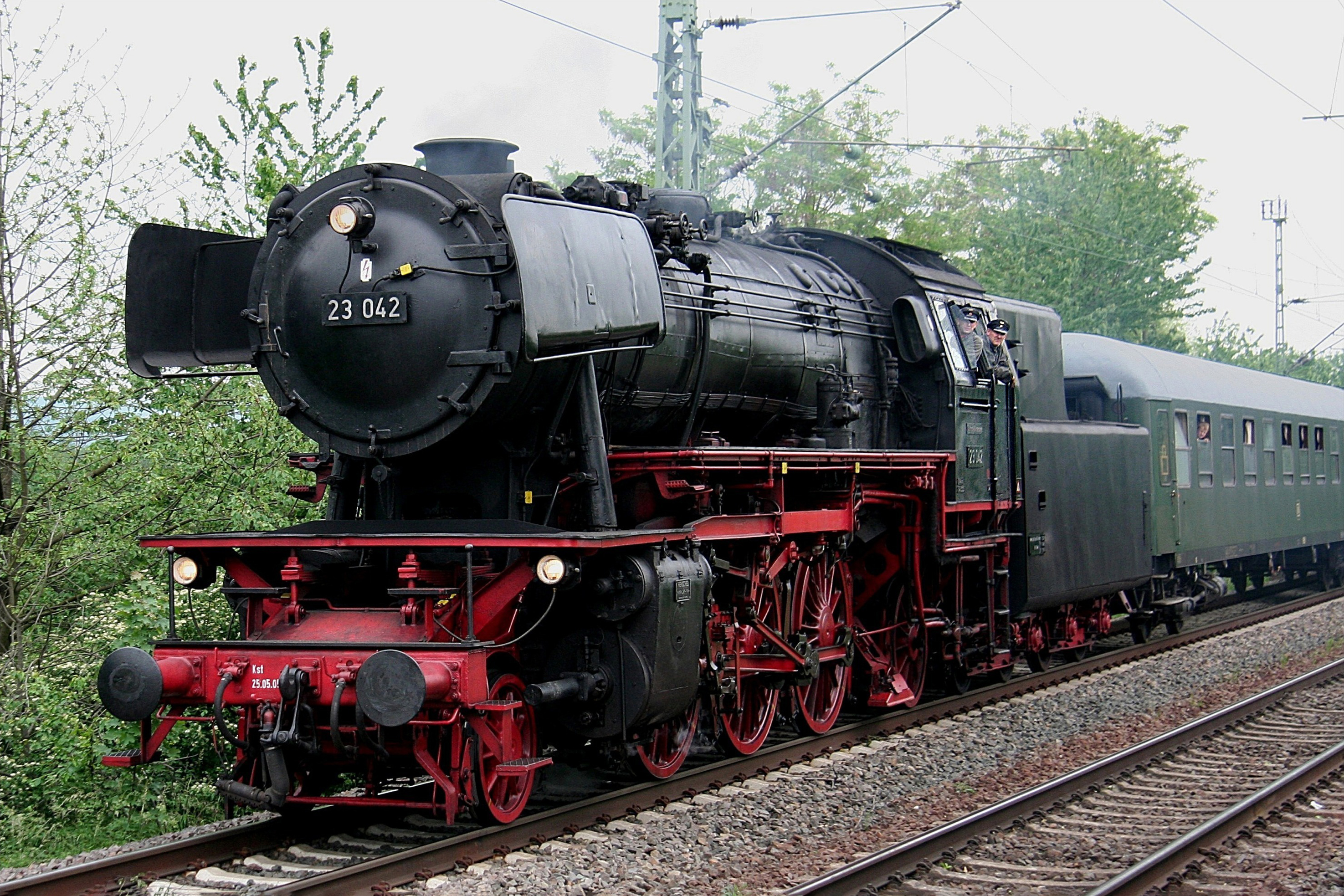
Approach to Urmitz halt...

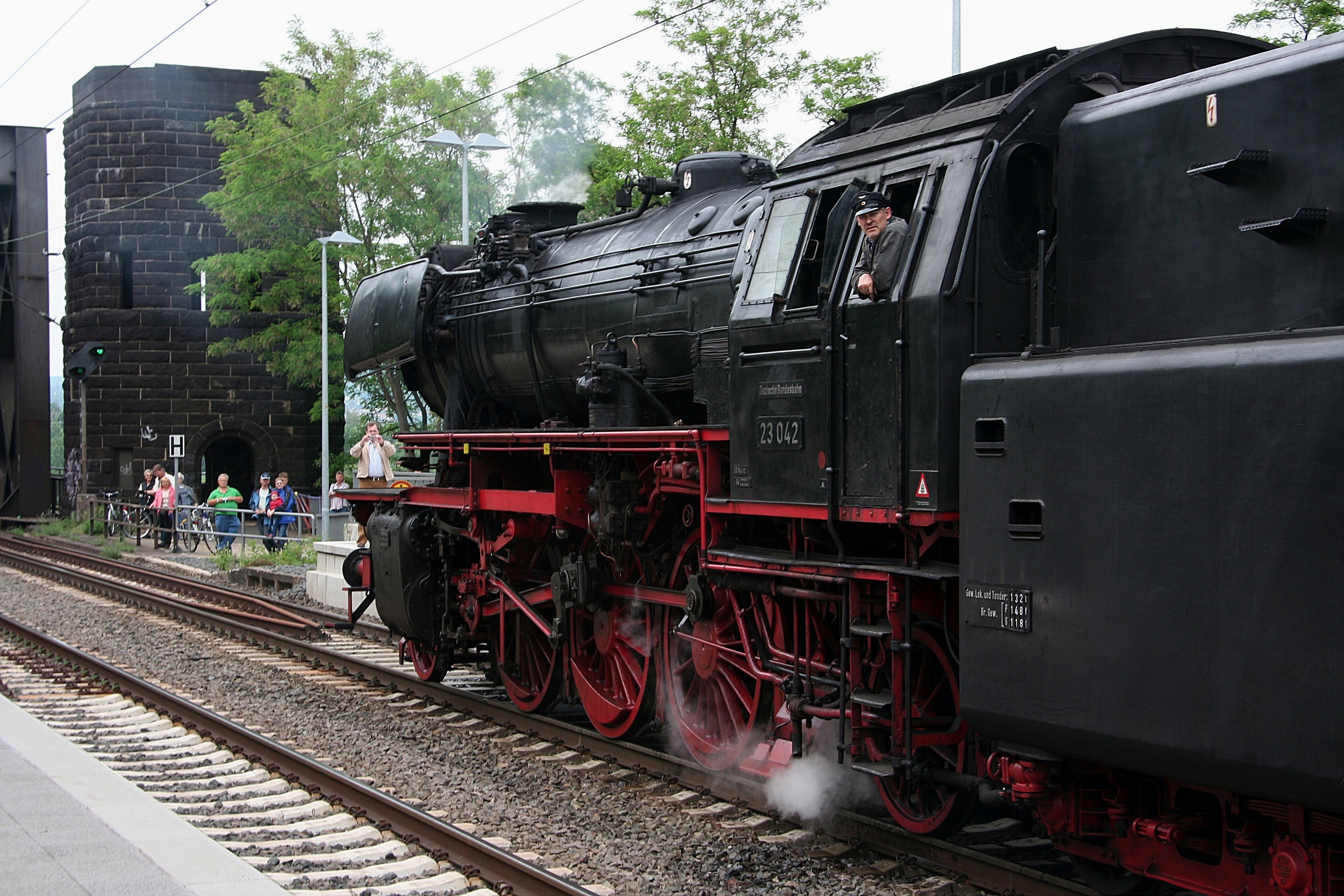
... in front of the Rhine bridge

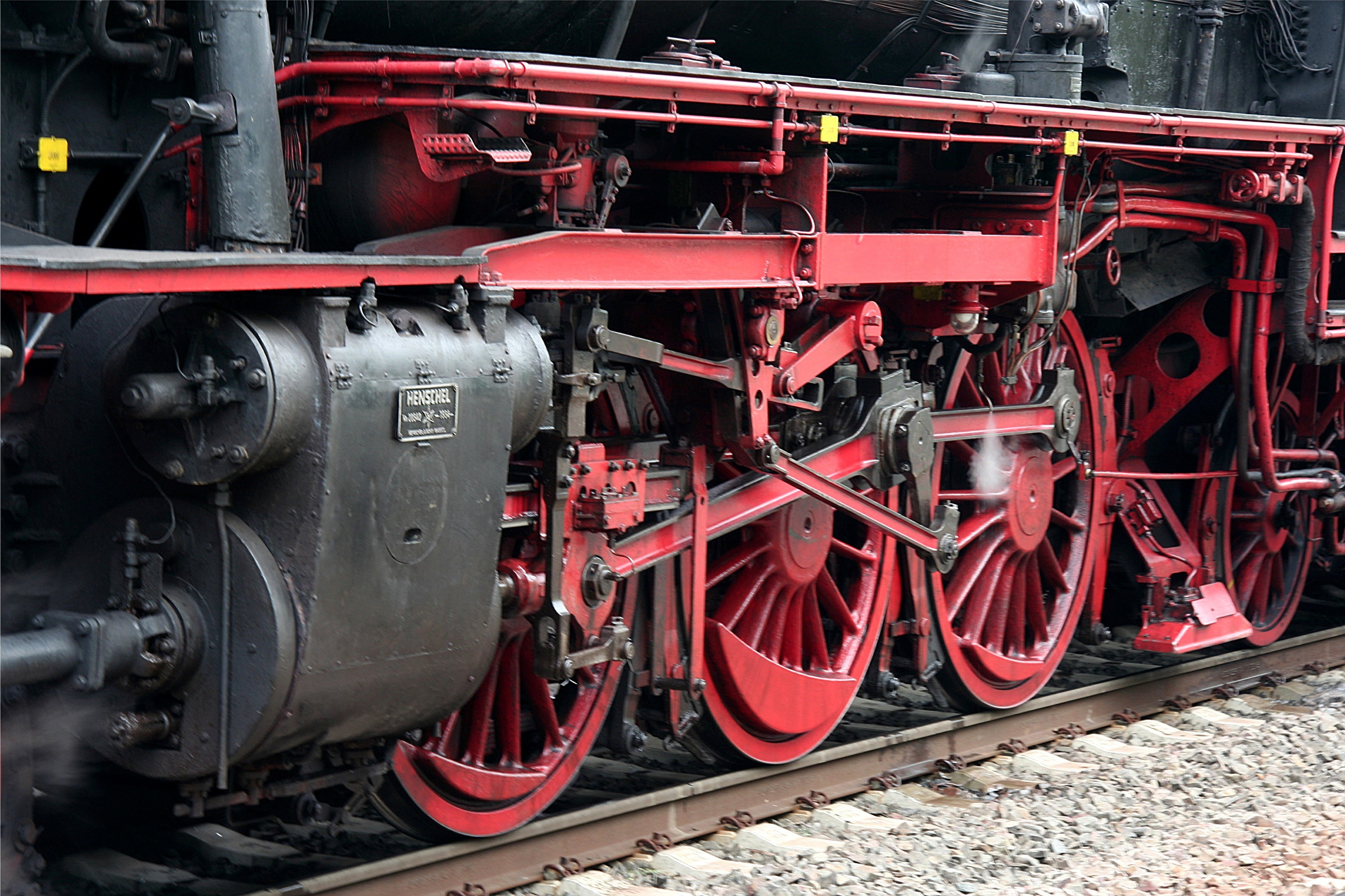
Driving and trailing wheels of locomotive 23 042

== See also ==
- Deutsche Bundesbahn
- List of DB locomotives and railbuses
