= BBÖ 729 =

Class of 26 Austrian 4-6-4T locomotives

BBÖ 729 DRB 78.6 ÖBB 78
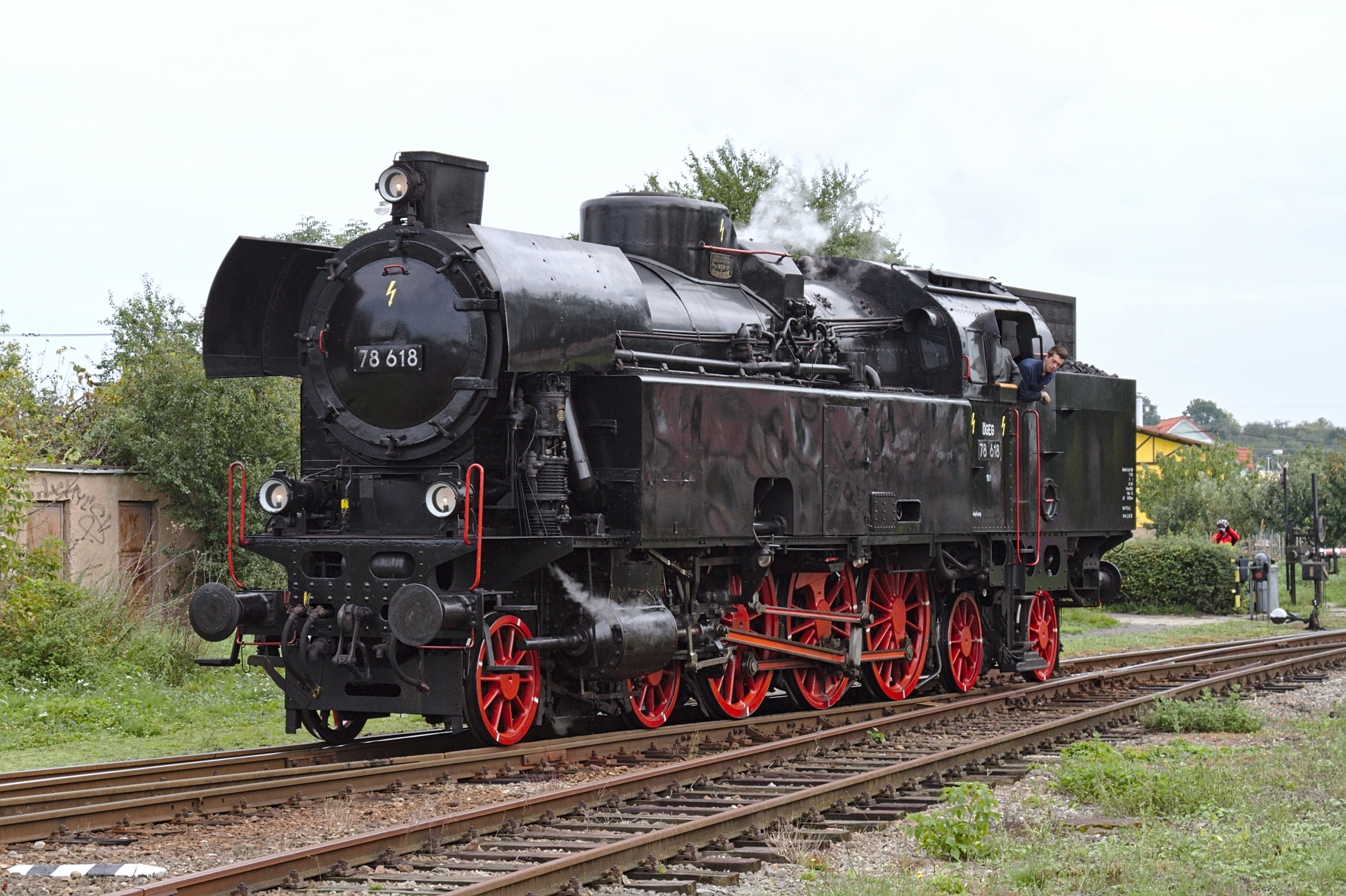
- ÖGEG 78.618 in Mikulov station
Type and origin
- Builder: Lokomotivfabrik Floridsdorf
- Build date: 1931–1938
- Total produced: 26
Specifications
- Configuration
  - Whyte: 4-6-4T
  - UIC: 2′C2′ h2t
- Gauge: 1,435 mm (4 ft 8 1/2 in)
- Leading dia.: 1,034 mm (3 ft 4 3/4 in)
- Driver dia.: 1,614 mm (5 ft 3 1/2 in)
- Trailing dia.: 1,034 mm (3 ft 4 3/4 in)
- Wheelbase
  - Overall: 11,880 mm (38 ft 11 3/4 in)
- Length
  - Over beams: 14,990 mm (49 ft 2 1/4 in)
- Width: 3,060 mm (10 ft 1/2 in)
- Height: 4,530 mm (14 ft 10 3/8 in)
- Axle load: 16 t (16 long tons; 18 short tons)
- Adhesive weight: 48.2 or 50.4 t (47.4 or 49.6 long tons; 53.1 or 55.6 short tons)
- Service weight: 108.4 or 113.1 t (106.7 or 111.3 long tons; 119.5 or 124.7 short tons)
- Fuel capacity: 6.0 t (5.91 long tons; 6.61 short tons) of coal
- Water cap.: 16.8 m^{3} (3,700 imp gal; 4,400 US gal)
- Boiler
- No. of heating tubes: 156 or 154
- No. of smoke tubes: 22
- Boiler pressure: 13 kgf/cm^{2} (1.27 MPa; 185 lbf/in^{2})
- Heating surface
  - Firebox: 3.55 m^{2} (38.2 sq ft)
  - Radiative: 12.00 or 13.50 m^{2} (129.2 or 145.3 sq ft)
  - Evaporative: 171.8 or 172.3 m^{2} (1,849 or 1,855 sq ft)
- Superheater
  - Heating area: 42.3 m^{2} (455 sq ft)
- Cylinder size: 500 mm (19 11/16 in)
- Piston stroke: 720 mm (28 3/8 in)
Performance figures
- Maximum speed: 95 or 105 km/h (59 or 65 mph)
- Indicated power: 1,800 PS (1,320 kW; 1,780 hp)
Career
- Numbers: BBÖ: 729.01 – 729.16; DRB: 78 601 – 78 626; ÖBB: 78.601 – 78.626
- Retired: 1973

The BBÖ 729 was a class of 26 Austrian 4-6-4T locomotives designed to haul fast passenger trains for the Federal Railway of Austria (Bundesbahnen Österreichs, BBÖ).

== History ==
.After the First World War, with a smaller Austria, the BBÖ wanted to use tank locomotives for express trains in order to save the fees for turning locomotives on foreign turntables for services to border countries. However, the Südbahn 629 series was too weak for these tasks and their fuel and water capacities were too small, so that they had to be supplemented at great expense abroad.

To remedy this, the head of the BBÖ construction department, Alexander Lehner, together with the Lokomotivfabrik Floridsdorf, designed a 2′C2′ h2t (4-6-4, superheated 2-cylinder, tank) locomotive, designated 729 series. The design used the boiler from Südbahn 109 series (BBÖ 209), while the bogies, wheels, drive and valve gear came from the 629 series. The locomotives had Lentz valve gear and Heinl mixer-preheaters.

Six were delivered in 1931 and four more in 1932. In 1936, six copies with Nicholson thermic syphons were reordered, the changed dimensions of which are shown in the table. The BBÖ not only used the locomotives on the originally intended border routes, they also hauled light express trains on the 300 km long western line between Salzburg or Linz and Vienna, such as the Orient Express, the Arlberg-Orient Express and the Ostend-Vienna-Express. A third order comprising ten locomotives had already been delivered to the Deutsche Reichsbahn, which classified the machines as the 78.6.

The series survived the Second World War without losses and was designated series 78 by the ÖBB. Equipped with a Giesl ejector and front-end throttles, they were in use until 1973.

== Preserved examples ==
The 78.606 is owned by the Austrian Railway Museum. After several years as a memorial in Amstetten, it was transferred to the Strasshof Railway Museum in summer 2012.

78.618 was acquired in 1976 by the Austrian Society for Railway History (Österreichische Gesellschaft für Eisenbahngeschichte, ÖGEG) as its first standard-gauge steam locomotive and, in the years up to 1986, was refurbished to be operational on a voluntary basis by association members. After a new general inspection in 2008, it was ready for operation in the Ampflwang locomotive fleet. Since a serious engine failure in March 2019, it can be viewed there as a partially dismantled exhibit. A renewed commissioning is not foreseeable for the time being. The 78.625 was also purchased as a spare part donor, but this machine is only preserved in fragments.
