= DB Class 78.10 =

Type and origin
- Power type: Steam
- Rebuilder: Krauss-Maffei
- Rebuild date: 1951
- Number rebuilt: 2
Specifications
- Configuration
  - Whyte: 4-6-4T
  - UIC: 2′C′2 h2t
  - German: Pt 37.17
- Gauge: 1,435 mm (4 ft 8 1/2 in)
- Leading dia.: 1,000 mm (3 ft 3 3/8 in)
- Driver dia.: 1,750 mm (5 ft 8 7/8 in)
- Trailing dia.: 1,000 mm (3 ft 3 3/8 in)
- Wheelbase
  - Axle spacing (Asymmetrical): 2,200 mm (7 ft 2 5/8 in) +; 1,570 mm (5 ft 1 3/4 in) +; 1,880 mm (6 ft 2 in) +; 2,700 mm (8 ft 10 1/4 in) +; 2,920 mm (9 ft 6 15/16 in) +; 2,800 mm (9 ft 2 1/4 in) =
  - Engine: 14,070 mm (46 ft 2 in)
- Length
  - Over headstocks: 15,937 mm (52 ft 3 1/2 in)
  - Over buffers: 17,237 mm (56 ft 6 1/2 in)
- Height: 4,550 mm (14 ft 11 1/8 in)
- Axle load: 17.0 t (16.7 long tons; 18.7 short tons)
- Adhesive weight: 51.1 t (50.3 long tons; 56.3 short tons)
- Empty weight: 81.1 t (79.8 long tons; 89.4 short tons)
- Service weight: 109.7 t (108.0 long tons; 120.9 short tons)
- Fuel type: Coal
- Fuel capacity: 5 t (4.9 long tons; 5.5 short tons)
- Water cap.: 17 m^{3} (3,740 imp gal; 4,490 US gal)
- Firebox
  - Grate area: 2.58 m^{2} (27.8 sq ft)
- Boiler
  - Tube plates: 4,700 mm (15 ft 5 in)
  - Small tubes: 51 mm (2 in), 123 off
  - Large tubes: 133 mm (5 1/4 in), 26 off
- Boiler pressure: 12 bar (12.2 kgf/cm^{2}; 174 psi)
- Heating surface
  - Firebox: 14.47 m^{2} (155.8 sq ft)
  - Tubes: 83.54 m^{2} (899.2 sq ft)
  - Flues: 47.99 m^{2} (516.6 sq ft)
  - Total surface: 146.00 m^{2} (1,571.5 sq ft)
- Superheater
  - Heating area: 58.90 m^{2} (634.0 sq ft)
- Cylinders: Two, outside
- Cylinder size: 575 mm × 630 mm (22 5/8 in × 24 13/16 in)
- Valve gear: Heusinger (Walschaerts)
- Train brakes: Compressed-air brake
Performance figures
- Maximum speed: 100 km/h (62 mph)
- Indicated power: 1,180 PS (868 kW; 1,160 hp)
Career
- Operators: Deutsche Bundesbahn
- Numbers: 78 1001 – 78 1002
- Retired: 1961

The two German steam locomotives of DB Class 78.10, operated by the Deutsche Bundesbahn, were rebuilds based on two Prussian P 8 engines which were converted by the firm of Krauss-Maffei and the Minden repair shop. The aim was to improve the acceleration performance of the vehicles, especially for duties on suburban lines and city (Stadtbahn) lines.

The running gear, drive and boilers of both locomotives, which originally had the running numbers 38 2919 and 38 2990, remained virtually unchanged. The driver's cab was redesigned. A short tender was added which was coupled to the engine with a shaft and improved the riding qualities when running in reverse. The locomotives were classed as tank engines and initially worked in the Munich area, later in Augsburg and finally by Lake Constance. They remained the only ones of their type and were retired as early as 1961.

Neither of the two DB Class 78.10 locomotives has been preserved.
