= Prussian P 8 =

Class of German 4-6-0 locomotive

Prussian P 8 DRG Class 38.10–40
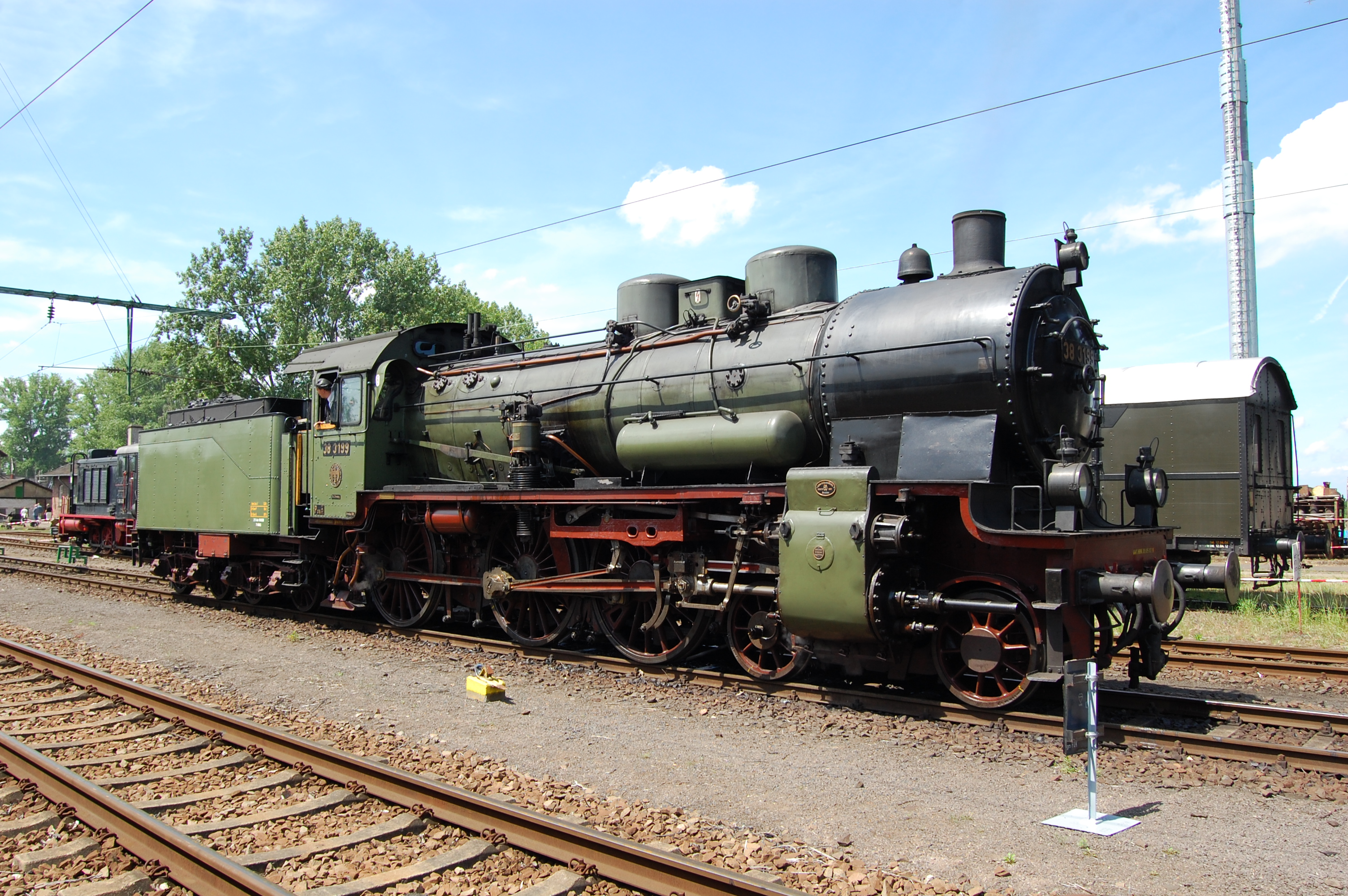
- Prussian P 8 in state railway livery
Type and origin
- Build date: 1908 - 1926
- Total produced: ca. 3,700
Specifications
- Configuration
  - Whyte: 4-6-0
  - German: P 35.15
- Gauge: 1,435 mm (4 ft 8 1/2 in) standard gauge 1,524 mm (5 ft) Russian Railways
- Leading dia.: 1,000 mm (39.37 in)
- Driver dia.: 1,750 mm (68.90 in)
- Length
  - Over beams: 18,585 mm (60 ft 11 3/4 in)
- Axle load: 17.36 t (17.09 long tons; 19.14 short tons)
- Adhesive weight: 50.60 t (49.80 long tons; 55.78 short tons)
- Service weight: 69–76.69 t (67.91–75.48 long tons; 76.06–84.54 short tons)
- Boiler pressure: 12 bar (1,200 kPa; 170 psi)
- Heating surface
  - Firebox: 2.58 m^{2} (27.8 sq ft)
  - Radiative: 14.58 m^{2} (156.9 sq ft)
  - Evaporative: 143.28 m^{2} (1,542.3 sq ft)
- Superheater
  - Heating area: 58.90 m^{2} (634.0 sq ft)
- Cylinder size: 575 mm (22.64 in)
- Piston stroke: 630 mm (24.80 in)
- Train heating: Steam from locomotive boiler
- Loco brake: Knorr automatic, single-chamber compressed-air brakes, working both sides of the coupled wheels, from 1913 bogie wheels also braked
Performance figures
- Maximum speed: 110 km/h (68 mph) (forwards); 50 km/h (31 mph) (backwards); 85 km/h (53 mph) (backwards with tub tender)
- Indicated power: 868 kW (1,164 hp)
Career
- Retired: 1974
- Disposition: Eighteen preserved, remainder scrapped

The Prussian Class P 8 of the Prussian state railways (DRG Class 38.10-40 of the Deutsche Reichsbahn) was a 4-6-0 steam locomotive built from 1906 to 1923 by the Berliner Maschinenbau (previously Schwartzkopff) and twelve other German factories. The design was created by Robert Garbe. It was intended as a successor to the Prussian P 6, which was regarded as unsatisfactory.

== Construction ==
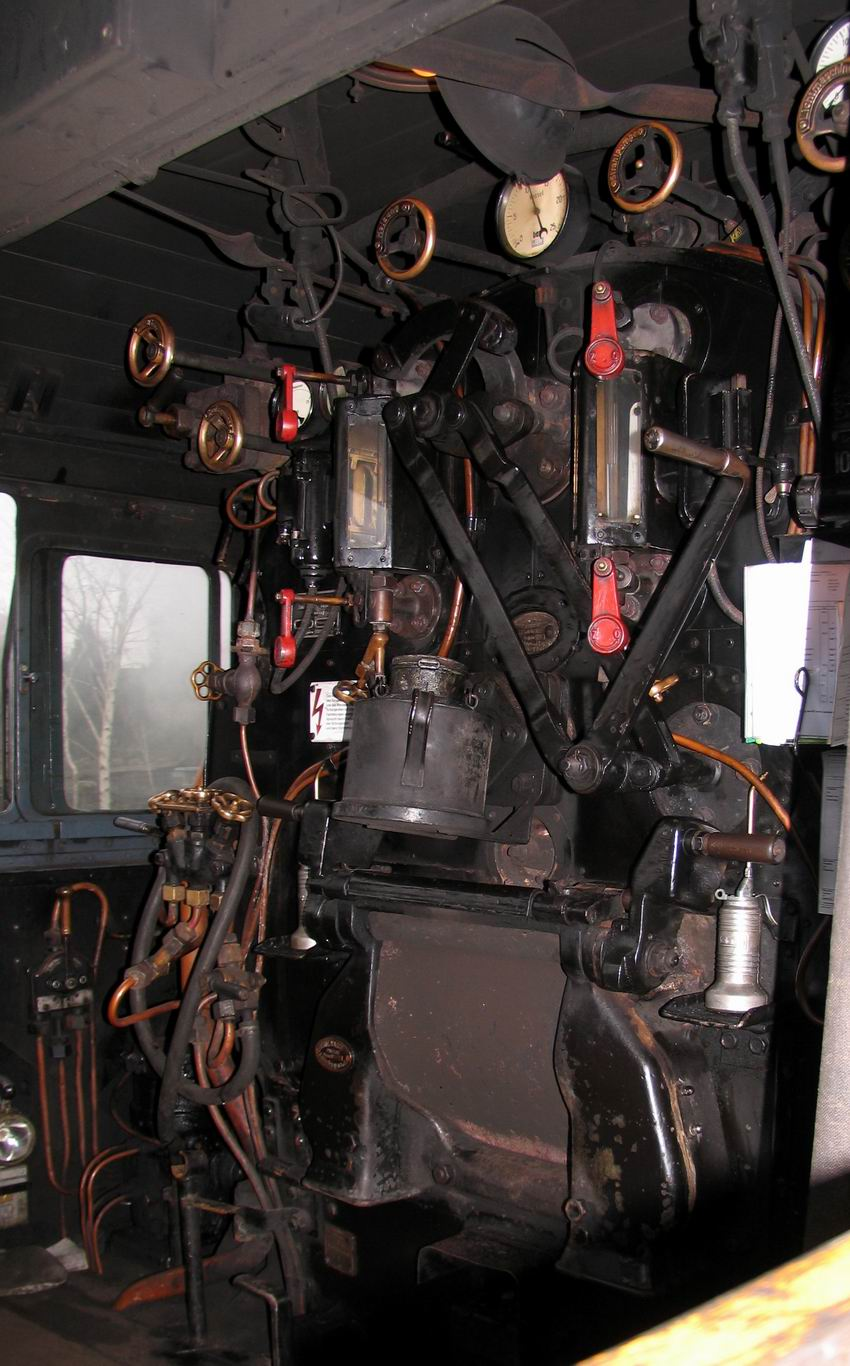
P8 driver's cab

Because Garbe was an advocate of the simplest possible designs, a straightforward, superheated steam, two-cylinder driving gear was envisaged. The P 8 benefited especially from superheated steam technology, which had just been developed by Wilhelm Schmidt (nicknamed 'Hot Steam Schmidt'), that led to outstanding performance for those times. The P 8 was a very economical locomotive that did not make great demands on the ability of the engine driver. At the outset Garbe even designed the P 8 as an express train locomotive, with the expectation of attaining a top speed of 110 km/h (68 mph). As a result, the first units were fitted with low-wind-resistance, tapered driver's cabs.

The enthusiasm of crews for the new locomotive was at first muted. The boiler was very effective at evaporation (there was already evidence of a combustion chamber at the front end of the firebox), however against that there were numerous teething troubles, e.g. the driving rod bearings were too small. This led continually to overheating. The loosely coupled Prussian box tender led to disturbing riding qualities when running tender-first. Its riding performance was never fully satisfactory. As a result of poor weight compensation, the top speed estimated by Garbe was never achieved and it was eventually assessed at 100 km/h (60 mph).

One characteristic feature of the P 8 is the large distance between the centre and rear coupled axles. At the outset the P 8 only had a steam dome behind the sandbox; later a forward feed dome was added. Further constructional changes affected, inter alia, the driver's cab roofs, the smoke deflectors and various external assemblies.

There would appear to have been a number of boiler variations. The following combinations can be seen in photographs:

1/. boiler feeds on sides of boiler, steam dome in front of sandbox 2/. boiler feeds on sides of boiler, steam dome behind sandbox 3/. boiler feeds on top of boiler without feed dome, steam dome behind sandbox 4/. boiler feeds on top of boiler with feed dome, steam dome behind sandbox

At least some of the very early engines (those with the "V" cabs) carried type (1) boilers and this type appears to have been the standard in the early years. Types (3) and (4) do not seem to have appeared until after World War I but ultimately became prevalent. See "100 Jahre Preussische P8" (Eisenbahn Kurier).

In order to be able to turn the locomotive even on small turntables, the Prussian state railways fitted the P 8 with tenders that originally held 21.5 m³ of water and 7 t of coal. Later the Deutsche Bundesbahn coupled the Class 38 with the tenders of withdrawn wartime locomotives the so-called 'Kriegslokomotiven', especially the bathtub tenders (Wannentender), which could carry more fuel. In addition the top speed when running tender-first was increased from 50 km/h (31 mph) to 85 km/h (53 mph).

In 1951, the Deutsche Bundesbahn rebuilt two P 8 with a small two-axle tender coupled with a shaft in order to improve the riding qualities when running in reverse, making them 4-6-4T locomotives. Listed as DB Class 78.10 (numbered above the Prussian T 18) they were withdrawn in 1961.

On the other hand, the Deutsche Reichsbahn also used tenders of DRG Class 17 steam locomotives that had been taken out of service. These were the so-called long-distance tenders.

== Employment ==
The P 8 could haul 300 t at 100 km/h (62 mph) and 400 t at 90 km/h (56 mph) on the flat and, after the world wars, could be found in almost the whole of Europe. The order to build the first 10 machines was issued to the firm of Schwartzkopff (later the Berliner Maschinenbau) in 1906. With up to 14 express coaches attached, the trial runs went brilliantly. The first engine of this, soon internationally famous, class was placed into service in the Lower Rhine with the number "Coeln 2401".

The P 8 could be used for a variety of duties and was found in heavy express train and goods train services heading almost every train. Even the railway authorities were very pleased with these engines, because the last P 8 locomotives were not mustered out by the Deutsche Reichsbahn until 1972, and by Deutsche Bundesbahn until 1974. More than 500 P 8 engines were in service for 50 years.

The majority of the P 8 class engines were built by Schwartzkopff (later Berliner Maschinenbau) who produced 1025 units, followed by Henschel in Kassel with 742 units. Besides the Prussian state railways, the Grand Duchy of Oldenburg State Railways (Grossherzoglich Oldenburgische Staatseisenbahnen) also bought five and the Grand Duchy of Mecklenburg Friedrich-Franz Railway (Grossherzoglich Mecklenburgische Friedrich-Franz-Eisenbahn) 13 machines. All German locomotive manufacturers later built Class P 8 locomotives including Hartmann and Esslingen.

=== P 8 Locomotives in the Baden State Railways ===
In order to compensate for the shortage of locomotives after the First World War as a result of ceasefire reparations and the large number of damaged locomotives, the Karlsruhe railway division reproduced 40 Prussian P 8 engines at the Maschinenbau-Gesellschaft Karlsruhe. They were stationed in Villingen, Mannheim and Karlsruhe, and were given running numbers 1153 to 1192. Under the Deutsche Reichsbahn they were renumbered as 38 3793 to 38 3832 in 1925.

== P 8 Locomotives in other countries ==
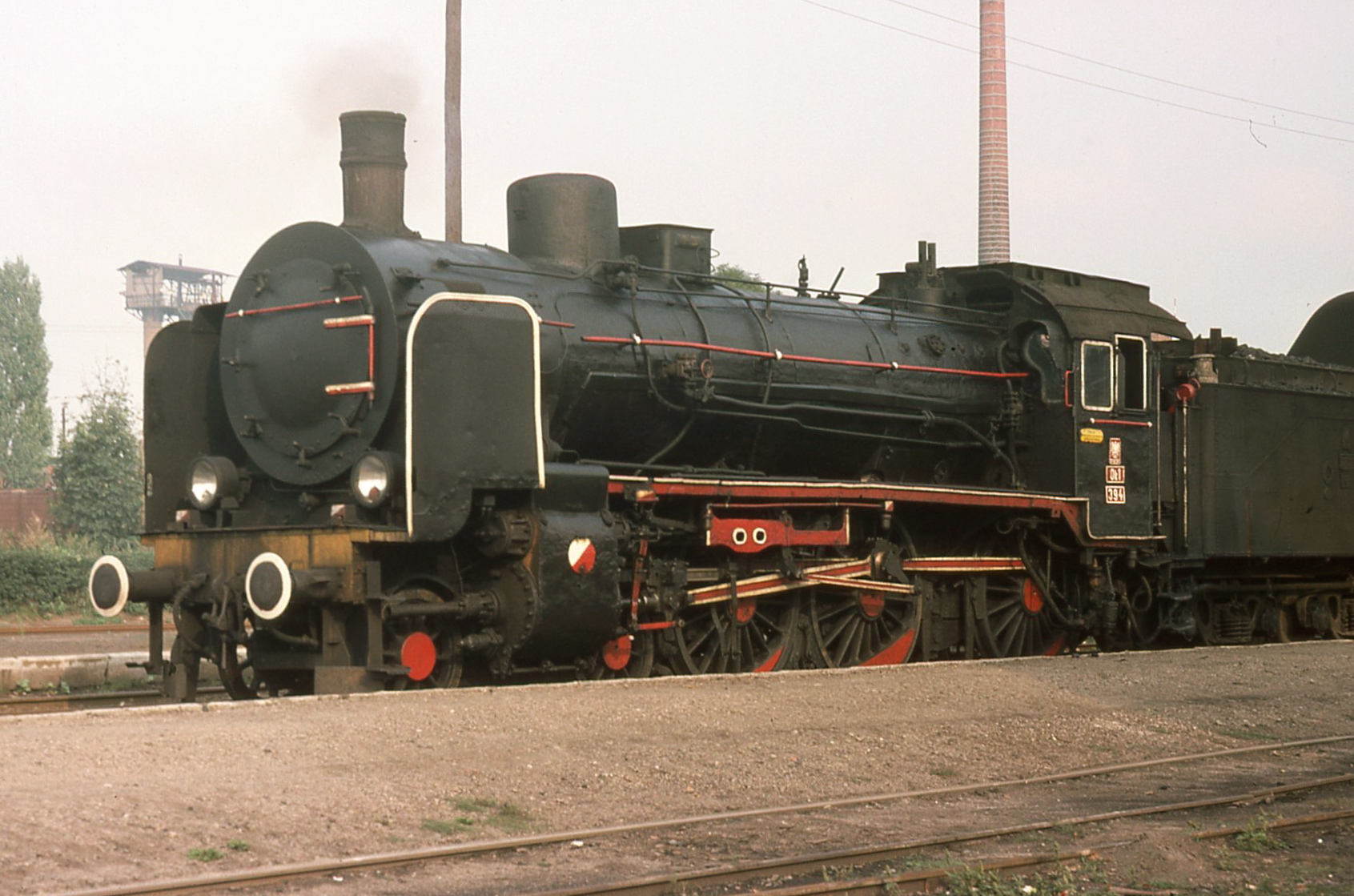
Original Prussian P8 running on PKP (Polish State Railways) as class Ok1 in August 1976

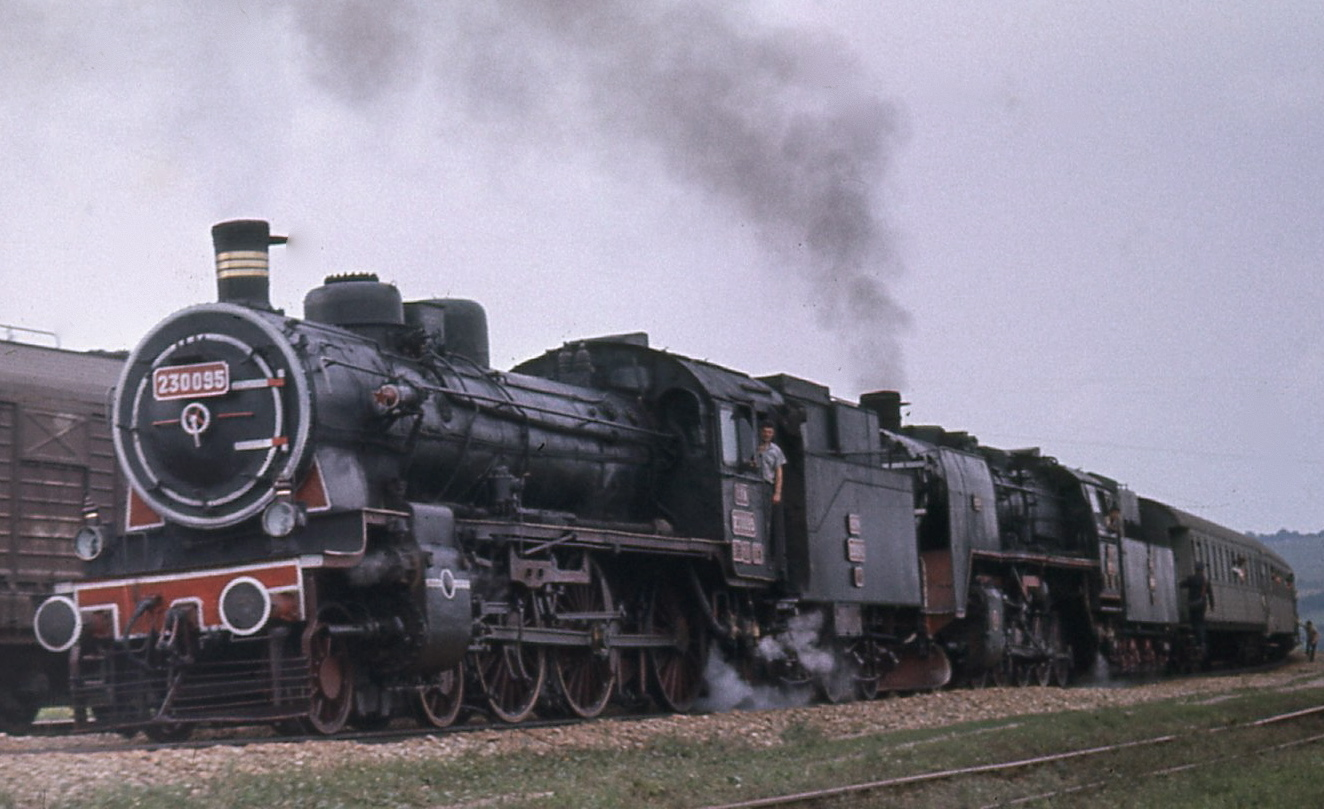
CFR (Căile Ferate Române, Romanian Railways) 230.000 class, built in Romania, double-heading at Sălişte near Sibiu, 1972

In total 3,556 or 3,561 locomotives (according to different sources), were built for German states in 1906–1923, including 60 or 65 for occupation World War I service in Warsaw and Brussels. Of these, 627 had to be transferred to the victorious powers as reparations after the end of the First World War: Poland received 192 (reclassified as the Ok1), Belgium 167 (type 64), France 162, Italy 25 (FS gruppo 675), Romania 18 (CFR 230-series), Lithuania 11 (LG class K8) and Greece 10 locomotives as SEK class Ζδ (ZETA-delta). 41 locomotives were ceded to Saar railways. Up to 1923, the newly founded Deutsche Reichsbahn (DRG) replenished the fleet of P 8 locos with new machines, and possessed 2933 machines in total, numbered 38 1001 to 3832 and 38 3951 to 4051. In addition to 3,556 or 3,561 produced for the German railways, 65 new locomotives were produced for Poland in 1922–1923 (numbered as PKP class Ok1-201 to Ok1-265), and 75 for Romania (as the CFR 230.000 class), in 1921–1930. A further 18 locomotives were acquired secondhand from the DRG, and 230 locomotives were manufactured under licence in Romania by Reșița and Malaxa between 1932 and 1939.

A total of 3,948 P 8 locomotives were built (including the inter-war built in Romania), which makes it the most numerous passenger train locomotive ever to be built in the world.

In 1935, the former Saar Railways locomotives were taken into the DRG fleet as 38 3833 to 38 3875; this included two P 8s that the Saar Railways had acquired from Alsasce-Lorraine a few months earlier for working border services.

After the Second World War, numbers 38 1069, 1391, 1434, 1677, 1809, 1818, 2052, 2692, 3264, 3495 and 3525 remained in Austria. Number 38 2052 was returned to the Deutsche Bundesbahn in 1952. Locomotives 38 1391, 1434, 1818, 3495 and 3525 went to the Soviet Union. The remaining machines formed the Austrian ÖBB Class 638. In 2004, the Austrian Society for Railway History (ÖGEG) acquired two machines of this type from Romania (the P 8 'copies'), one of which carries out steam 'specials' under the fictitious number of ÖBB 638.1301. Polish locomotives Ok1 were taken over by Germany during World War II, but along with new reparations, Poland received 429 of former P 8 engines after the war, used in line service until 1981. Three of the class were impounded by British forces after World War II in Norway. They were sent to Copenhagen for repair and eventually were purchased by the Danish State Railways where they became DSB class T numbered 297, 298 & 299. The last survivor was scrapped in 1973.

=== France ===
In France, the 162 locomotives received as reparations were divided between five railways:

- The Chemins de fer de l'Est received 25 locomotives. They were renumbered 3311–3335 by the Est, and became 1-230.F.311 to 1-230.F.335 in the SNCF's Région Est list.
- The Chemins de fer d'Alsace-Lorraine received 25 locomotives. They were renumbered 2350–2374 by the AL, and the 22 survivors became 1-230.F.352 to 1-230.F.374 in the SNCF's Région Est list.
- The Chemins de fer du Nord received 75 locomotives. They were renumbered 3.1601 to 3.1675 by the Nord, and became 2-230.C.1 to 2-230.C.75 in the SNCF's Région Nord list.
- The Chemins de fer de l'État received 17 locomotives. They were renumbered 230-943 to 230-958 by the État, and the seven survivors became 3-230.E.943 to 3-230.E.958 in the SNCF's Région Ouest list.
- The Chemin de fer du Midi received 20 locomotives. There were renumbered 3701–3720 by the Midi, became 230-701 to 230-720 in the after the PO-Midi merger, and became 4-230.H.701 to 4-230.H.720 in the SNCF's Région Sud-Ouest list.

During World War II, many of the French P 8 locomotives were taken away by the German authorities, and while most returned, some were lost to East Germany and Poland. After the war, the SNCF decided to concentrate their P 8 locomotives on the Région Est. The État and its successor the Région Ouest had hated its former German locomotives, and withdrawn them as quickly as possible. Consequently, only 3-230.E.943 was still in service in 1946 when it was transferred to Région Est as 1-230.F.343. Of the former Midi locomotives, only 4-230.H.714 did not survive until 1946, when the remaining 19 became 1-230.F.401 to 1-230.F.420. In addition four German locomotives were discovered in France after the war, and these became 1-230.F.600 to 1-230.F.694; later 1-230.F.601 to 1-230.F.604.

Between 1948 and 1950, Région Nord had lent nine locomotives to Luxembourg as CFL 3902–3910. Four of these, along with 9 others were transferred to Région Est in 1950, where they became 1-230.F.210 to 1-230.F.272. The Nord had made extensive use of its P 8s and retained as may as it could. The last P 8 on Région Nord was retired in 1962, and the last on Région Est in 1966.

== The Netherlands ==
Five locomotives entered service with the NS in 1945 because many Dutch locomotives were taken or destroyed by the Germans in World War II. They were classified as the series NS 3850. They were numbered 3851 to 3855.

All locomotives were returned to Germany in 1947.

== Preserved P 8 Locomotives ==
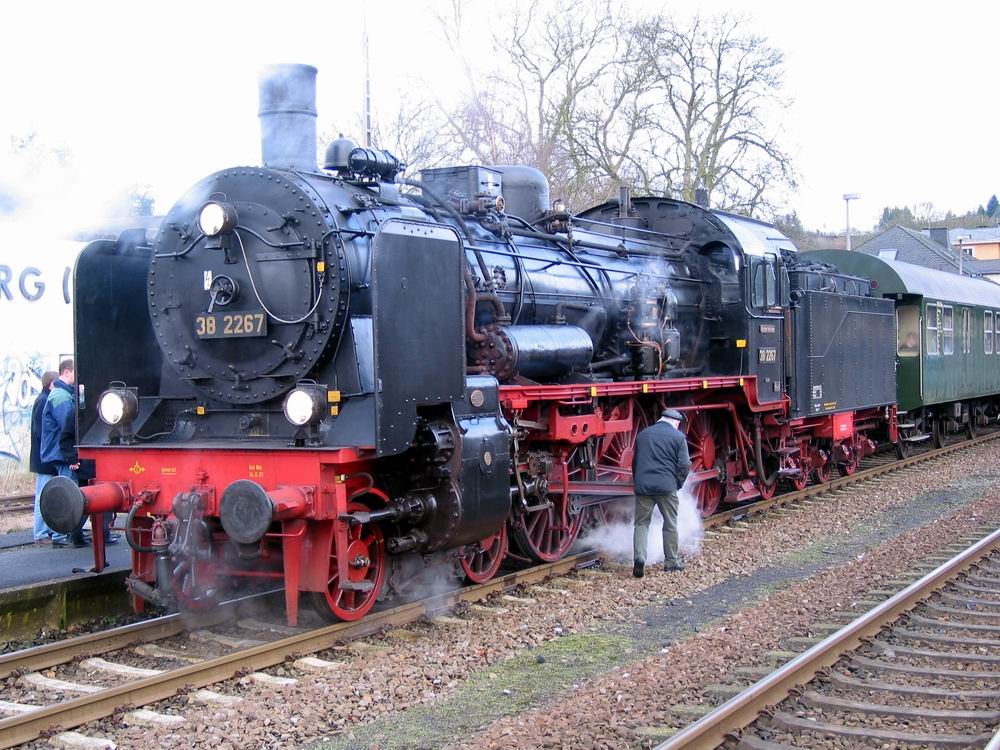
Prussian P 8 38 2267, built 1918

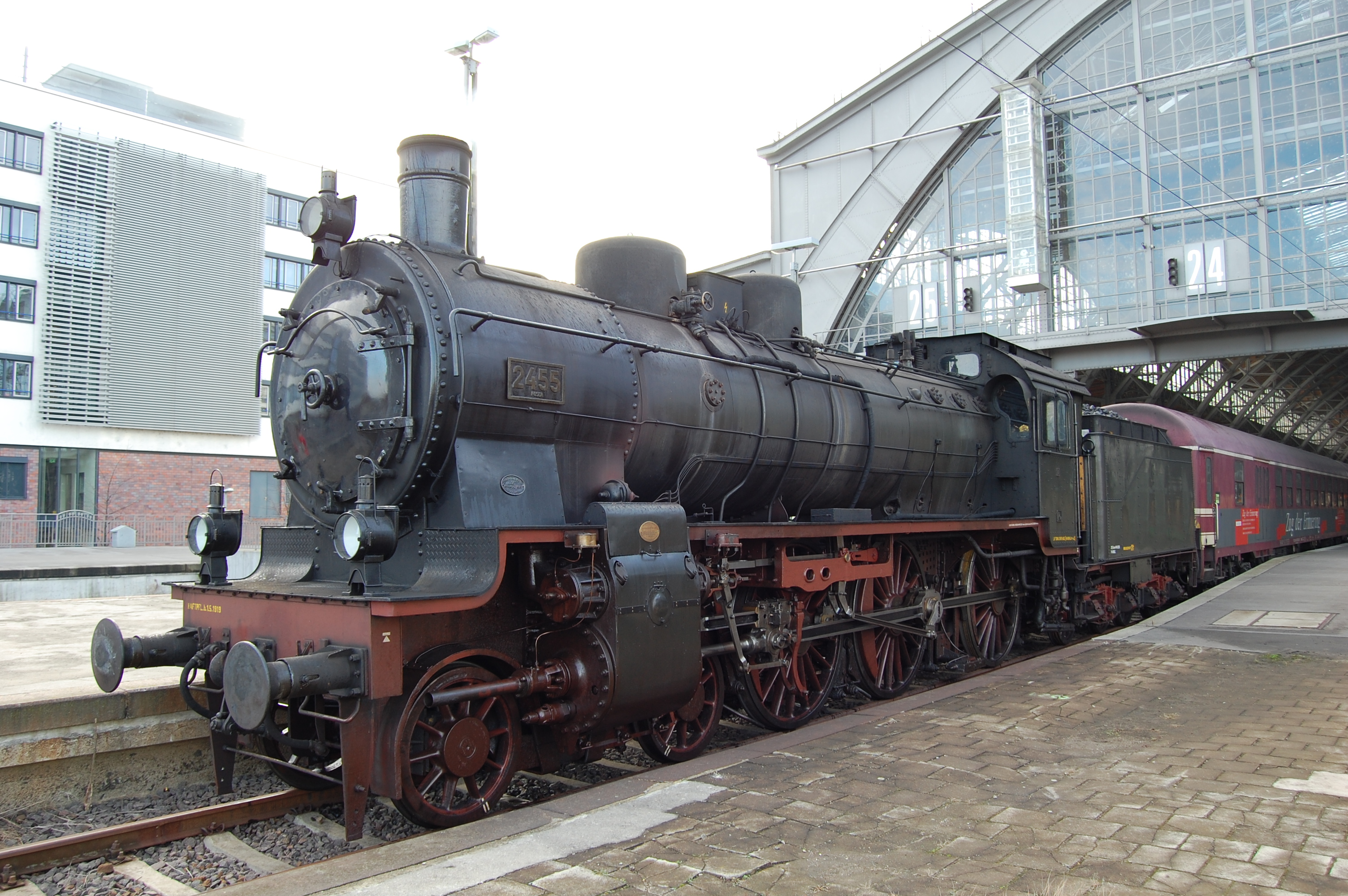
P 8 2455 Posen in Leipzig

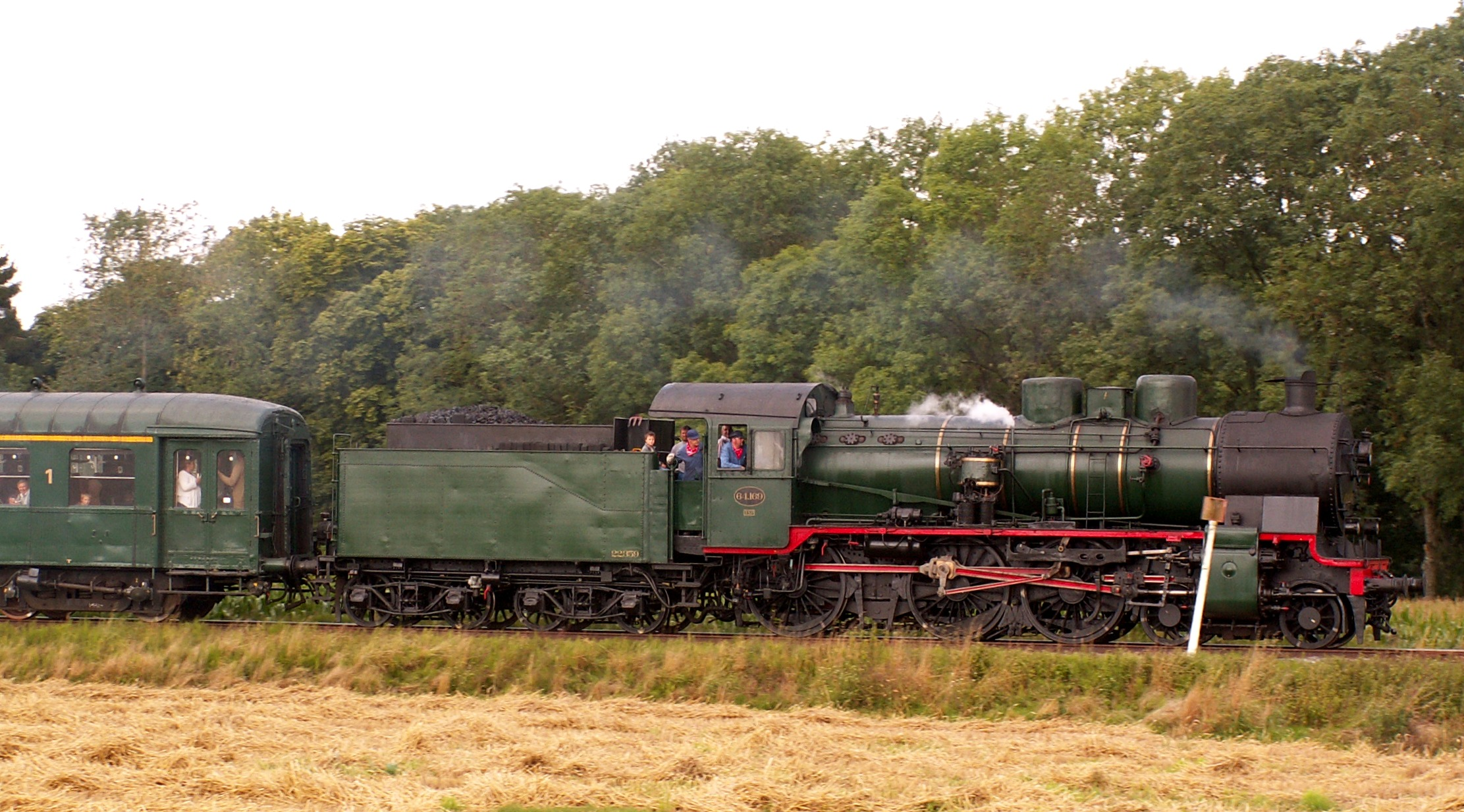
PFT 64.169 On the Chemin de fer du Bocq touristic line

- Frankfurt 2421, later 38 1182 (Berliner 4485 of 1910). It belongs to the DB Museum at Nuremberg (Verkehrsmuseum Nürnberg) and has been in operation for 61 years. As of 2008, it is stabled at the Gera locomotive depot (Historisches Bahnbetriebswerk Gera).
- Hannover 2412, later 38 1444 (Linke-Hofmann 963 of 1913). It was bought back by Linke-Hofmann-Busch in 1961, and placed in the company's private museum.
- Königsberg 2458, later 38 1772, later DB 038 772-0 (Schichau 2275 of 1915). This was the last P 8 in service with Deutsche Bundesbahn Officially retired on December 5, 1974, it was still in service until February 13, 1975, for farewell journeys. It had covered 3,719,271 kilometres (2,311,048 mi) before its withdrawal. In the 1980s it was reactivated for steam specials by railway fans. Since it had to be taken out of service in 1993, number 38 1772 is preserved as a mobile memorial. It is at present in the Bahnbetriebswerk Hanau.
- Posen 2431, later Osten 2545, later 38 2155, later PKP Ok1-359 (Berliner 6388 of 1917) is in the Polish Railways depot at Wolsztyn.
- Erfurt 2553, later 38 2267 (Henschel 15695 of 1918). It is owned by the Bochum-Dahlhausen Railway Museum (Eisenbahnmuseum Bochum-Dahlhausen), and usually heads trains on nostalgic trips through the Ruhr area. It is at present undergoing an overhaul.
- Elberfeld 2535, later 38 2383, later DB 038 382-8 (Henschel 16539 of 1919). This was the penultimate P 8 in service with Deutsche Bundesbahn. Since 1977, it has been at the German Steam Locomotive Museum (Deutsches Dampflokomotiv-Museum or DDM) in Neuenmarkt.
- Danzig 2441, later Stettin 2536, later 38 2425, later PKP Ok1-296 (Schichau 2739 of 1919) is in the Deutsches Technikmuseum Berlin.
- Posen 2455, later Osten 2566, later Breslau 2600, later 38 2460, later CFR 230.094 (Linke-Hofmann 1804 of 1919). It was sold by the DRG to Romania in August 1926, it was operated there until about 1974. After its sale to Manuel Jussen in spring 1998 it was restored in Romania in 2001. It represents the period of the early 1920s. The locomotive was used since 2008 as motive power for the "train of remembrance" (Zug der Erinnerung). It based at the Dieringhausen Railway Museum (Eisenbahnmuseum Dieringhausen).
- Stettin 2517, later 38 2884 (Vulcan 3641 of 1920). It is now in the Nuremberg Transport Museum.
- Halle 2586, later 38 3180, later CFR 230.105 (Linke-Hofmann 2257 of 1921). It was to Romania in 1926 and repatriated to the Bavarian Railway Museum in Nördlingen in 1998.
- Elberfeld 2580, later 38 3199, later CFR 230.106 (Linke-Hofmann 2276 of 1921). Another P 8 sold to Romania in 1926, where it served until 1974. Railway fans discovered it in the scrap yard and had it restored to full operation in Klausenburg in 1999 in the livery of the former Reichsbahn. Since 2002 the locomotive has been deployed again on museum services. It is based at the South German Railway Museum (Süddeutsches Eisenbahnmuseum) in Heilbronn.
- Elberfeld 3097, later 38 3650 (Borsig 11419 of 1922). It stands in the car park of a shopping center in Böblingen-Hulb, near Stuttgart. It was delivered to (Hamburg-)Harburg shed, and was on duty there until 1945; finally being withdrawn from service from Tübingen in 1972. It then stood immobilized in Bahnhof Breitenholz until 1979 and then was sold to the shopping centre to attract customers. Standing in the open there, the loco has meanwhile become very run down.
- Hannover 2591, later 38 3711, later DB 038 711-8 (Hohenzollern 4255 of 1922). It has been plinthed in Berenbostel (near Hannover) since it was withdrawn in 1974.
- Hannover 2676, later 38 3999, later CFR 230.110 (Schichau 2998 of 1923). Another P 8 sold to Romania in 1926. It was repatriated in 1999, and is now in the Darmstadt-Kranichstein Railway Museum.
- Altona 2445, later ÉB 6445, later SNCB-NMBS 64.045 (Henschel 13855 of 1916). One of many war reparation P 8s, it is coupled to the tender of 22.153. It is currently stored non-operational in the museum-depot of Bruges, not open to the public.
- The Belgian heritage railway Patrimoine Ferroviaire et Tourisme (PFT-TSP) bought in 2002 (and transferred in March 2007) a refurbished P 8 from Romania. The former CFR 230.084 was repainted in Belgian livery and numbered 64 169 (as National Railway Company of Belgium has owned 168 P 8s as class 64). It had been manufactured by Henschel with the factory number 18939. In 2013, this loco had a new boiler certification and was in theory authorized to run on the whole Belgian rail network (at 80 km/h), before the ban by DVIS and Infrabel, prohibiting historical locomotives and rolling stock on the main net.
- CFR 230.174 (Reșița 211 of 1933). On display at the Austrian Railway History Company (ÖGEG) site in Ampflwang, Austria
- CFR 230.301 (Reșița 315 of 1935). In service at the ÖGEG site as ÖBB 638.1301.

== Remarks ==
As early as the end of the 1930s the Deutsche Reichsbahn planned to replace the now ageing P8 by a new locomotive. This led to the development of the DRG Class 23, of which only 2 examples had been built, however, by 1941. In 1950, the Deutsche Bundesbahn began to use the more advanced DB Class 23 as a replacement for the P8. The factories produced 105 examples by 1951. The change of motive power meant that the last Class 23 was withdrawn by the DB only one year after the last P8 had been retired.

== See also ==
- Prussian state railways
- List of Prussian locomotives and railcars
- List of preserved steam locomotives in Germany
