= Bad Krozingen–Münstertal railway =

Railway line in Baden-Württemberg, Germany

Bad Krozingen–Münstertal/Sulzburg railway
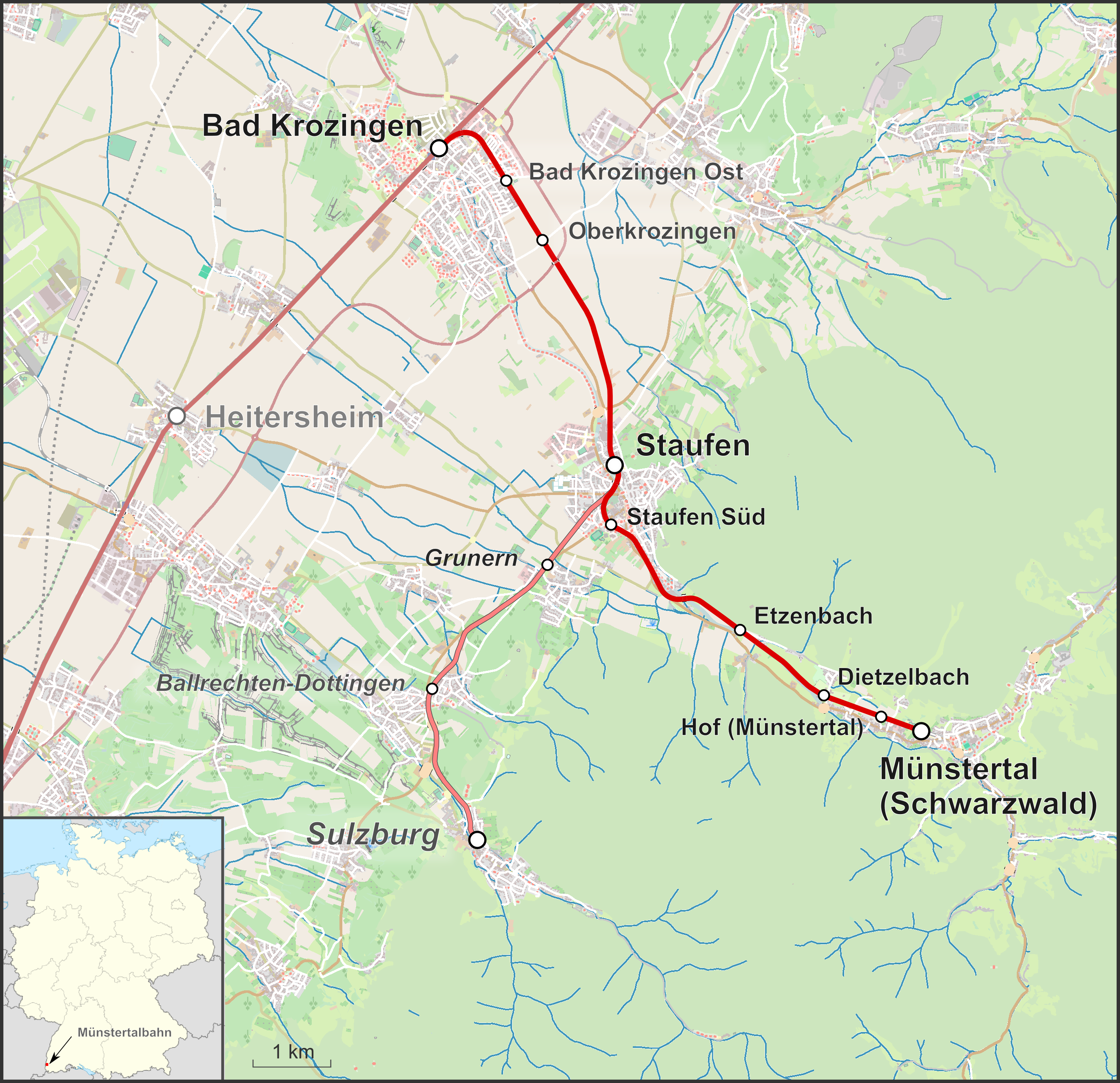

Overview
- Line number: 9433 (Bad Krozingen–Sulzburg); 9434 (Staufen–Münstertal)
- Locale: Baden-Württemberg, Germany

Service
- Route number: 725

Technical
- Line length: working: 11.0 km; closed: 5.6 km
- Track gauge: 1,435 mm (4 ft 8 1/2 in) standard gauge
- Minimum radius: 190 m (620 ft)
- Electrification: 15 kV/16.7 Hz AC overhead catenary
- Operating speed: 80 km/h (49.7 mph) (maximum)
- Maximum incline: 2.22%

The Bad Krozingen and Münstertal Railway, also the Münstertal Railway (German: Münstertalbahn), is a branch line in Baden-Württemberg, in southwest Germany, running from Bad Krozingen to Münstertal (Schwarzwald) in the Black Forest. In Bad Krozingen the link has a junction with the Rhine Valley Railway. The owner and operator of the Münstertal Railway is the Südwestdeutsche Verkehrs-Aktiengesellschaft (SWEG). Its depot is located in the station at Staufen. Passenger traffic on the former branch to Sulzburg was closed in 1969.

== Route ==
The line runs mostly through fields, meadows and woodlands. The line begins in Bad Krozingen and runs via Oberkrozingen to Staufen. There the line formed two branches. The southern branch (which was the original branch and is now disused) ran via Grunern and Ballrechten-Dottingen to Sulzburg. The northern branch runs via Etzenbach and Dietzelbachstraße to Münstertal. The line—including the disused section—is wholly within Breisgau-Hochschwarzwald.

== History ==
=== Construction of the Krozingen–Sulzburg branch line and the first years of operation ===
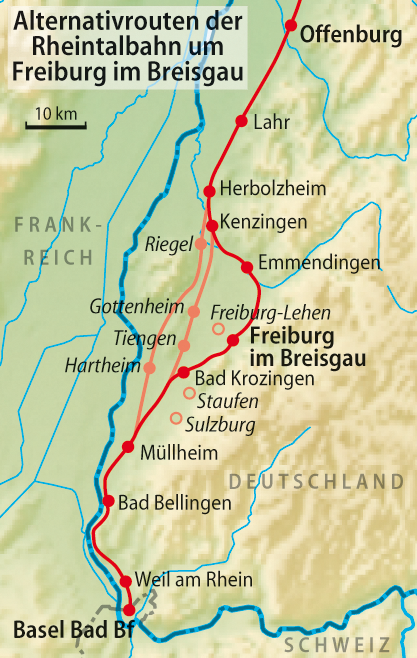
Neither the originally considered routes for the Rhine Valley Railway (orange), not the built route through Freiburg (red) passes through Sulzburg and Staufen.

Under article 1 of the Baden Railway Act of 1838, the Baden Mainline from Mannheim to Basel would be built "close to the mountains." That made it possible to run through the large town of Freiburg by using the route of the Rhine Valley Railway that was eventually built (red), rather than using one of the direct routes considered (orange). Nevertheless, none of the alternatives considered for the railway would have given a connection to Staufen (because of the hilly terrain around the Schlossberg) and to Sulzburg (because of its location in a valley of the Black Forest). Therefore, both town became increasingly marginalised economically as industry was established on the railway and many inhabitants of the outlying towns then moved to the railway towns.

Therefore, the construction of railways on various routes was discussed in 1884: Krozingen–Staufen, Schallstadt–Staufen–Sulzburg–Müllheim and Sulzburg–Heitersheim. Work that was started on the selected Krozingen–Staufen–Sulzburg route by Herrmann Bachstein was quickly abandoned in 1890. Therefore, on 25 February 1892, the town of Staufen addressed a petition to the government and the Landstände (estates) in Karlsruhe for a railway from Krozingen to Staufen. Ultimately, it was decided to build a standard gauge branch line on the route that had already been chosen. The two towns invited the Berlin company, Vering & Waechter, which already operated the Rhein–Ettenheimmünster Local Railway (Lokalbahn Rhein–Ettenheimmünster) and was involved in planning the Kander Valley Railway (Kandertalbahn). The company committed to the project on 3 April 1892. After obtaining a site for railway operations and the grant of a subsidy of 110,000 marks, it was granted the concession for the construction of the line on 15 April 1894 and the branch line was built quickly and inaugurated on 20 December 1894.

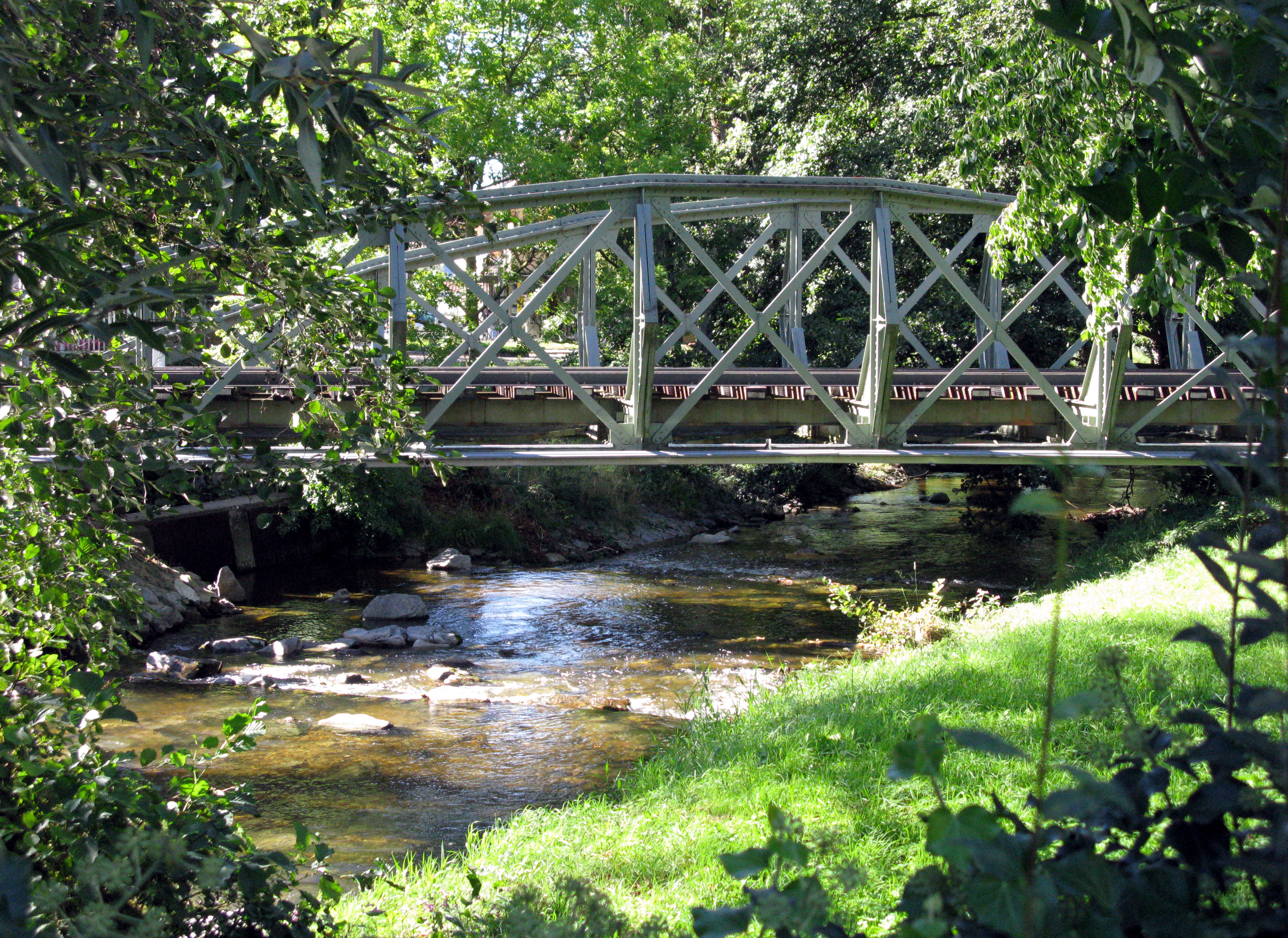
Railway bridge over the Neumagen

Nearly 70 percent of the line was built on a straight line. The only sharp curve, which had a radius of just 200 metres, was between Staufen station and the bridge over the Neumagen. The gradients, on the other hand, were not so favourable. Not even 20 percent of the line was horizontal. A total of at least 2,350 metres had a gradient of 1 in 50 (or 2.0%) to overcome. In February 1895, the line was added to the list of those to which the Convention concerning International Carriage by Rail would apply. The operation developed very favourably until the end of World War I; revenues were higher than were initially estimated. Already in 1904–05 the loading areas at Sulzburg station had to be increased.

In 1898, the Vering & Waechter company was taken over by the German Railway Operating Company (Deutsche Eisenbahn-Betriebs-Gesellschaft, DEBG). In the same year, the company took over the concession for operating the branch line. On 31 March 1901, the DEBG took over the concession along with the Kander Valley Railway and the joint workshop in Sulzburg for the price of 967,000 marks.

=== Construction of the branch line to Münstertal ===
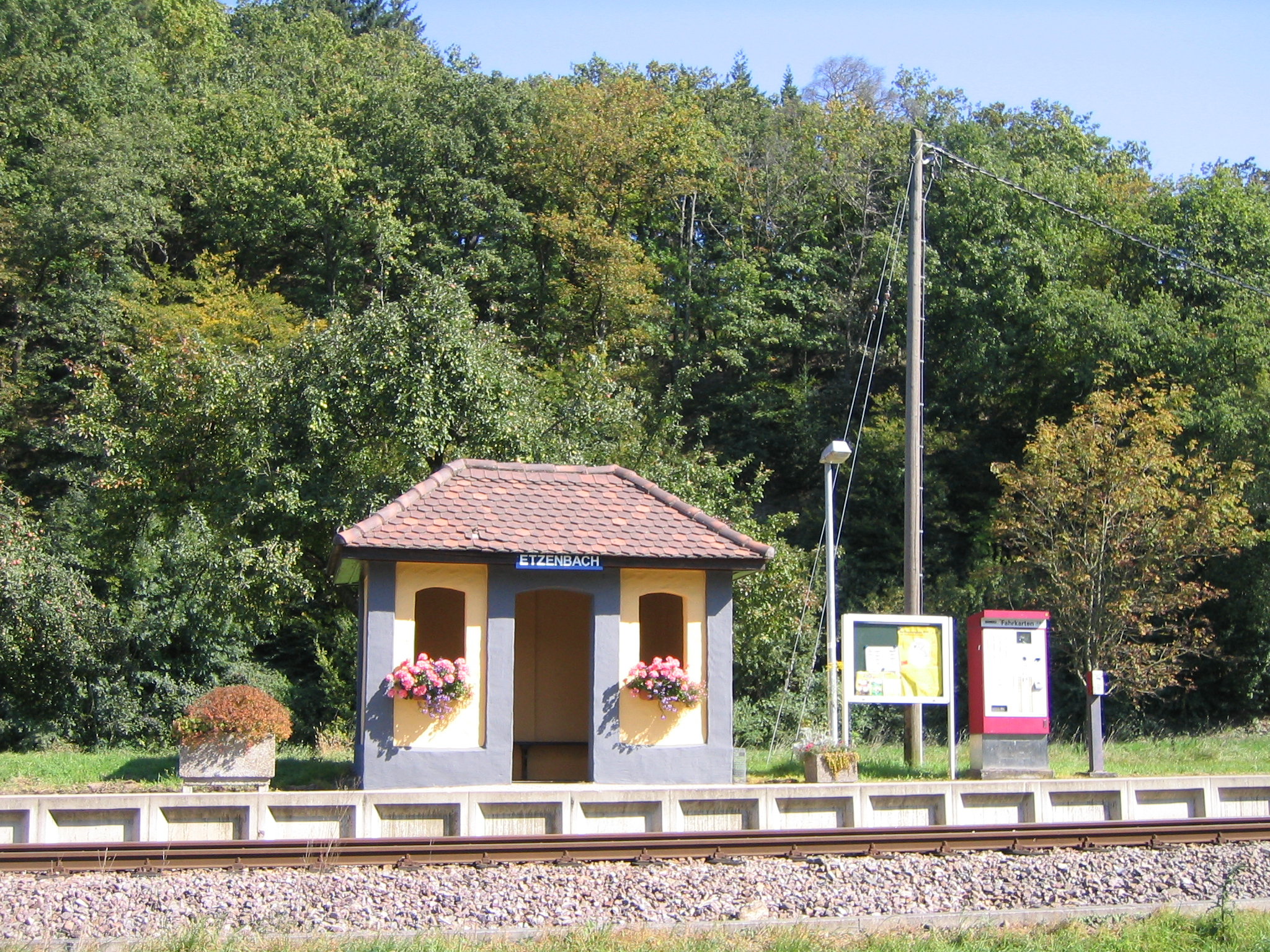
Etzenbach station

Between 1896 and 1912, various projects were developed to build a rail link to Münstertal. They failed due to the disunity of the then independent municipalities of Untermünstertal and Obermünstertal. Finally the DEBG was issued with a concession to build a branch line between Staufen and Untermünstertal on 30 July 1913. Of the estimated cost of about 89,000 marks per kilometre of line, the state of Baden agreed to fund 30,000 marks and the municipality of Untermünstertal agreed to fund 10,000 marks.

The construction, which had been contracted to the Vering & Waechter company, began in early October 1913. It was affected by the outbreak of war, but not interrupted, so that the new section of track was finally put into operation on 1 May 1916. For topographical reasons, Untermünstertal station had to be built on the eastern bank of the Neumagen. It would therefore have been necessary to build a junction near Staufen station to avoid a river crossing. That would have required the line to run through the town. It was decided, therefore, first to use the Neumagen bridge on the existing line and branch off at a set of points near the cemetery. Since no direct crossing over the Neumagen was possible at the newly built Staufen Süd station because of urban development, the line follows an S-curve on the western bank of the Neumagen until it crosses the river and continues on the eastern bank. A sharp curve (of 200 metres radius) was required only where the new line branched off from the original line. For over 60 percent of the line, it runs in a straight line. The branch to Münstertal climbs around 90.21 metres. Just one 100 metre-long section of the line is horizontal, while the longest gradient of 1 in 45 extends for over 1,071 metres. Untermünstertal station is reached on an approximately three metre-high embankment and the end of the line lies in a cutting that is nearly seven metres-deep.

=== Takeover by the SWEG and closure of the Sulzburg branch ===
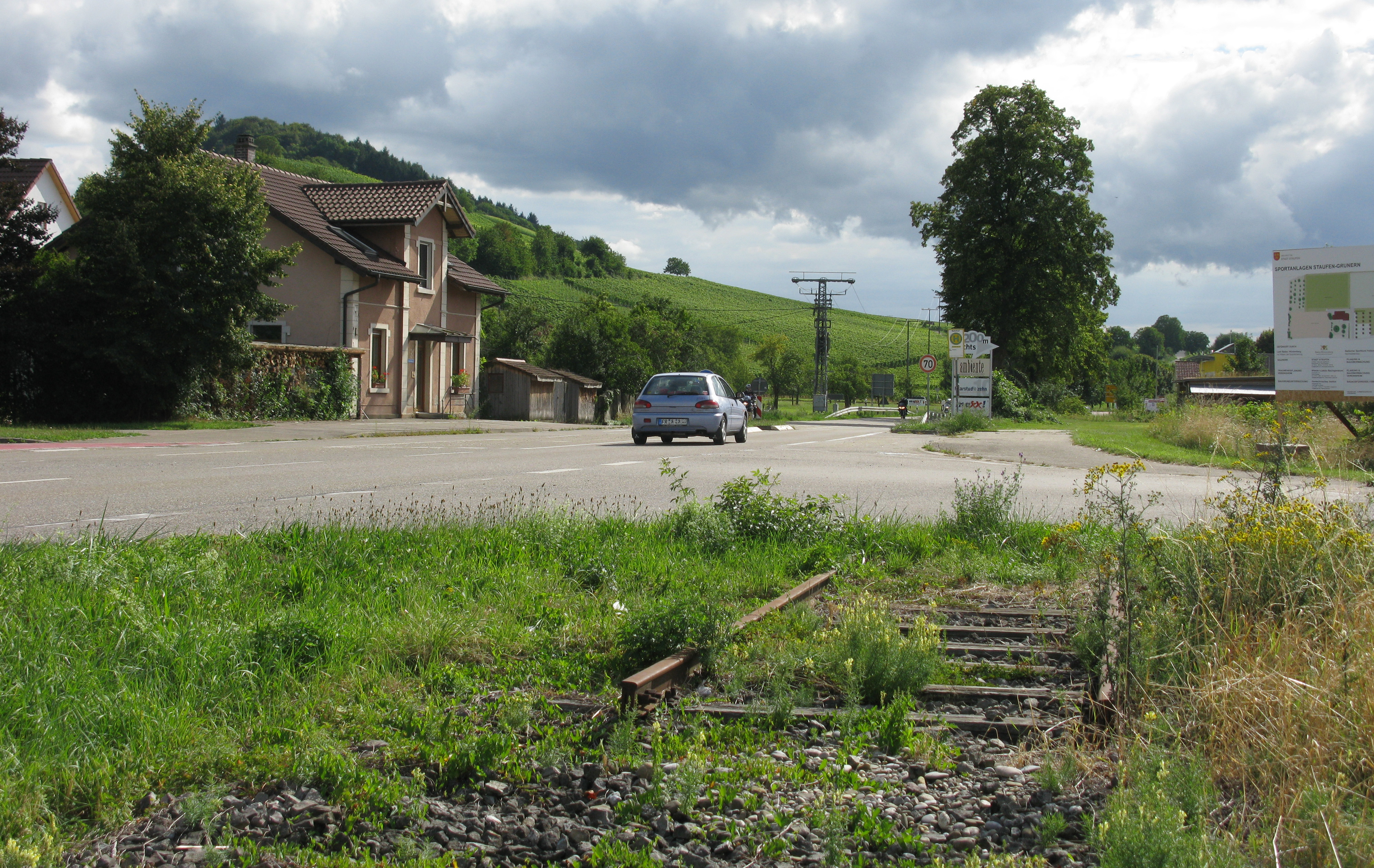
Track of the disused line at Grunern with former station restaurant

In 1963, the line was taken over by the Südwestdeutsche Verkehrs-Aktiengesellschaft (SWEG). On 27 September 1969, passenger services on the line to Sulzburg were abandoned and replaced by buses; the transport of goods between Grunern and Sulzburg ended on 15 March 1973 and the section was dismantled in the mid-1970s. Following the insolvency of the last rail-connected industrial establishment in Grunern, operations on the remaining section were closed in 1996. Today the line to Sulzburg is partly built over.

The freight yard in Staufen was closed on 30 September 2002. The points connecting the last siding to an industrial plant were dismantled two years later.

=== Electrification and modernisation ===
The cooperation agreement between Regio-Verkehrsverbund Freiburg (regional transport association of Freiburg) and the Nahverkehrsgesellschaft Baden-Württemberg (Local transport company of Baden-Württemberg, NVBW) that was contracted on 11 March 2009 provided for the electrification of the suburban railway network of the Freiburg region by 2018, It also provided for the electrification of the Bad Krozingen–Münstertal line during a full closure between 29 May 2012 and 9 June 2013.

First, operations were temporarily suspended on 29 May 2012 in order to renew the rails and sleepers. On 23 July 2012, the Regional Council approved the electrification of the railway line and related work for an estimated cost of €14 million. In early 2013, it became known that the electric railcars could not run at 80 km/h, but only at 60 km/h as state funds had not been authorised to upgrade the level crossings. In mid-February 2013, the funds were then released but despite a general authorisation, funds were not disbursed by the transport ministry

The electronic control centre in Staufen went into service in August 2013. On 21 September 2013, the state minister of transport, Winfried Hermann officially inaugurated electrified operations using the 15 kV AC catenary, which had been completed on 15 July 2013.

== Rail services ==
The line is entirely in the area where fares are set by Regio-Verkehrsverbund Freiburg.

Operator	Route	Frequency
SWEG	Bad Krozingen – Bad Krozingen Ost – Oberkrozingen – Staufen	Every 30 minutes
SWEG	Staufen - Staufen Süd – Etzenbach – Dietzelbach – Hof – Münstertal (Schwarzwald)	Every 60 minutes
SWEG	Freiburg im Breisgau – Schallstadt – Bad Krozingen – Staufen (– Münstertal (Schwarzwald))	Two train pairs a day (2016)

Services run every half-hour between Bad Krozingen and Staufen and continue hourly to Münstertal and there are additional services in the peak hour. Individual services are operated by Deutsche Bahn via Norsingen, Schallstadt, Ebringen, Freiburg-St. Georgen to Freiburg Hauptbahnhof, reversing in Bad Krozingen.

== Rollingstock ==
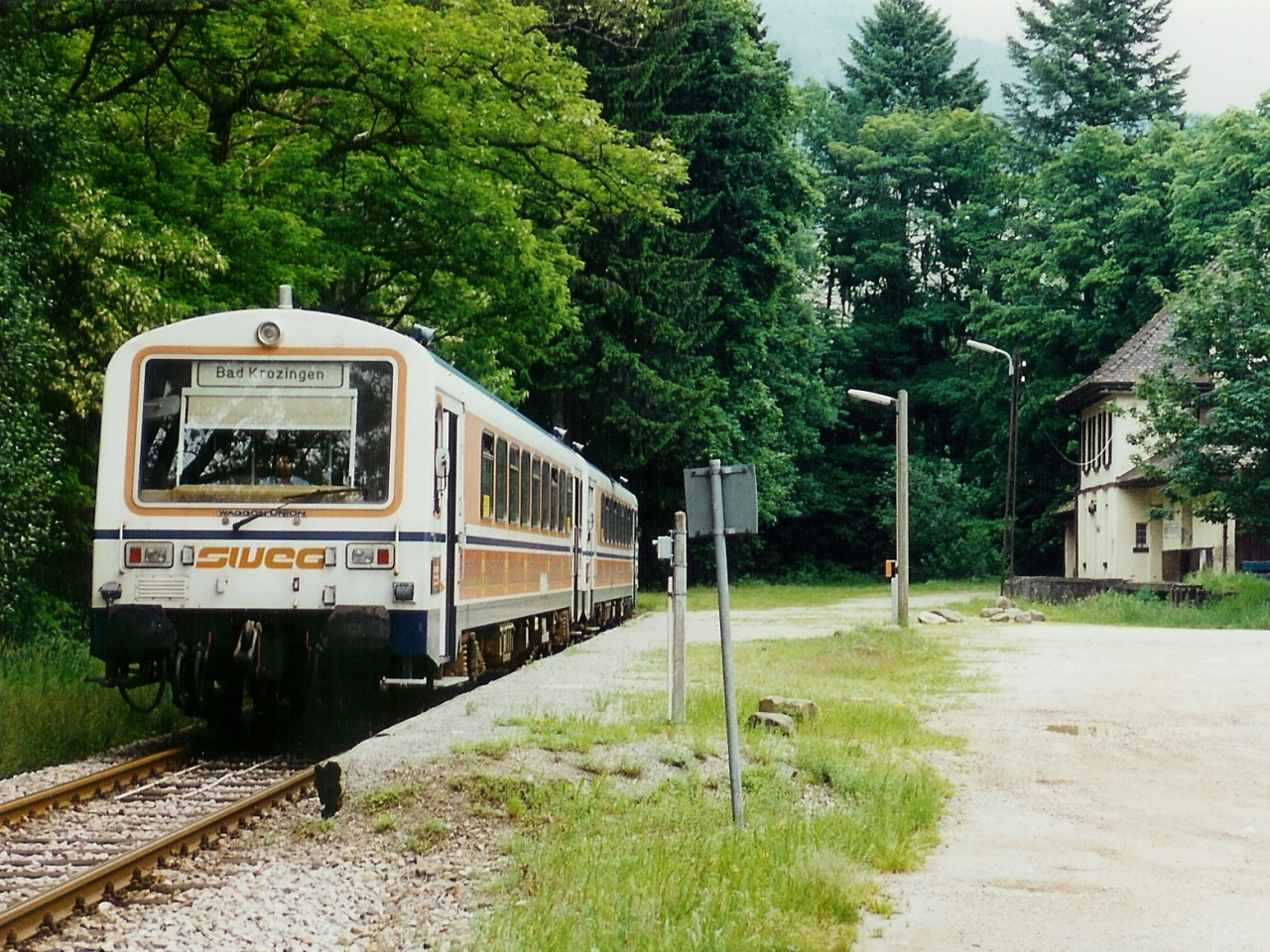
DMU on the Münstertal railway at the terminus in Munster in 1987

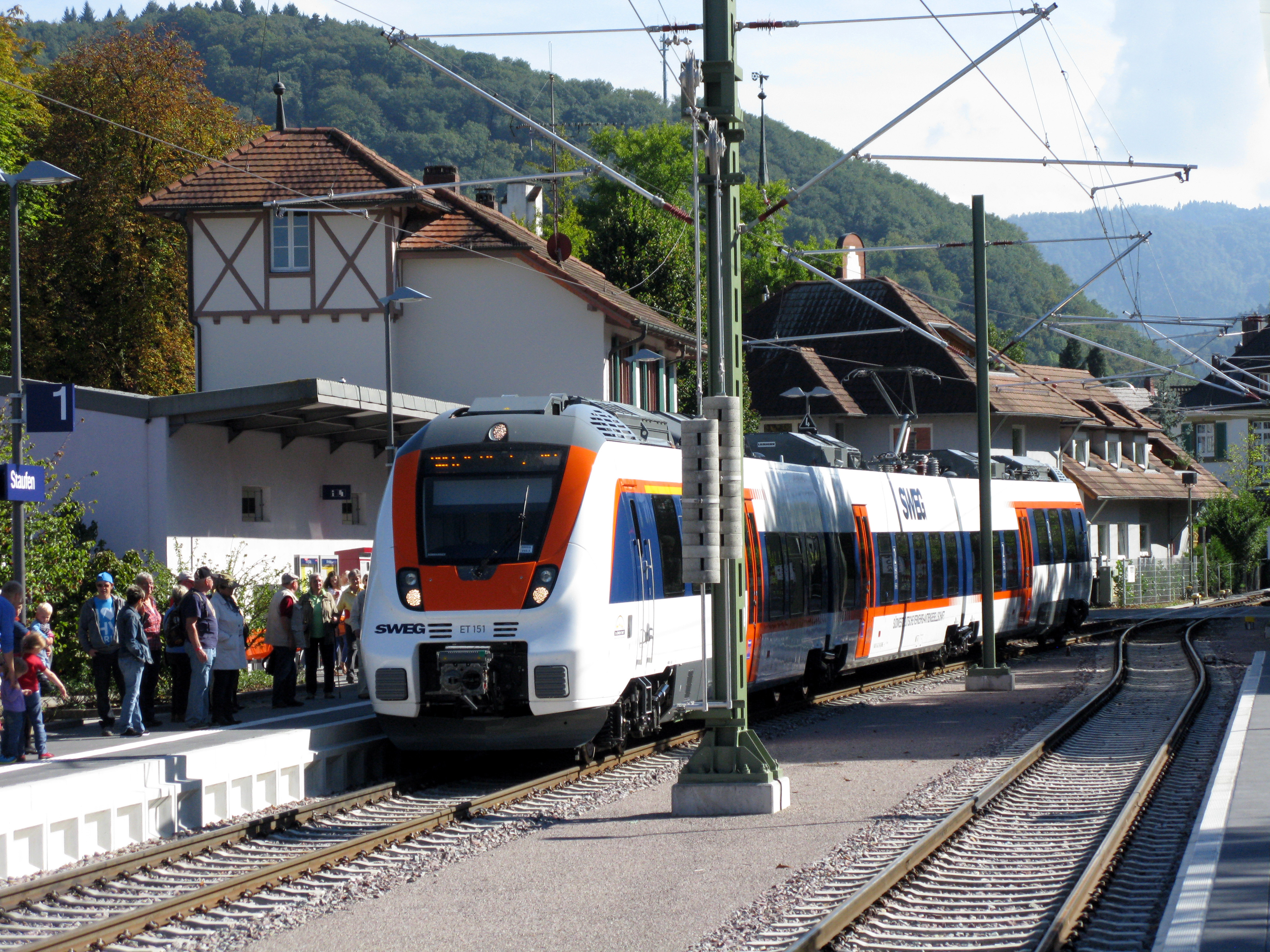
Bombardier Talent 2 of SWEG in Staufen station

The class NE 81 diesel multiple units that had been used on the Münstertal line from the early eighties were replaced in the 1990s by Regio-Shuttles.

The 11.0 km-long track was operated with three diesel railcars of this class in 2012. Since the delivery of two new electric vehicles of the Bombardier Talent 2 class (ET 150 and 151) was delayed from June to September, substitute Regioshuttles were hired from Ostdeutschen Eisenbahn-Gesellschaft (ODEG).

The two vehicles were delivered in early July 2013 to the SWEG depot in Endingen. The first test and training runs of the new railcars was originally planned to begin in April 2013, but they were delayed to the end of July because of delays in the approval process and the provision of funds by the State of Baden-Württemberg. The operations division first used a Talent 2 in passenger service on 9 September 2013.
