= Eurovapor =

European society of steam railway fans

Coordinates: 47°22′N 8°33′E

Eurovapor is a European association of railway fans dedicated to the preservation of steam locomotives and historic railway vehicles, based in Switzerland.

== History ==
Eurovapor stands for the Europäische Vereinigung zur betriebsfähigen Erhaltung von Dampflokomotiven und historischem Eisenbahnmaterial' which means 'European Society for Preservation of Working Steam Locomotives and Historic Railway Stock'.

It was founded in 1962 in Basel, Switzerland. The headquarters of the society is in Zürich. Its aim is not merely to preserve steam locomotives and historic wagons as museum exhibits, but to restore the vehicles and to operate them as a living witness to a bygone technological era. Eurovapor is mainly active in Switzerland and southern Germany. Its members are organised into sections and they voluntarily maintain and operate 15 steam engines and their associated wagons.

In May 1968 the first steam locomotive, the Class T 3, No.30, was taken over from the Southwest German Transport Company (SWEG) together with three wagons. They were restored to operational condition by 1970 since when they have been working, primarily on the Kander Valley Railway. By 1973 Eurovapor could already offer steam services on 5 routes: as well as the Kander Valley Railway, there were also the Solothurn-Zollikofen-Bern railway (SZB), the Vereinigte Bern-Worb Bahnen (VBW), the Waldenburgerbahn (WB) and the line from Metzingen to Bad Urach. From 1974 to July 1980 Eurovapor has also looked after steam trains on the Bregenzerwald Railway in Vorarlberg.

By the end of the 1970s, Eurovapor had procured, with the assistance of the Genossenschaft der Dampflokfreunde (GdF) larger locomotives as well, like the DB Class 23, no. 23 058, DRG Class 41, no. 41 073, and DRG Class 50, no. 50 2988. Together with the town of Blumberg the museum railway of Wutach Valley Railway was opened in 1977.

== Vehicle collection ==
The vehicle fleet since 1987 has comprised 15 steam locomotives, a diesel railcar, a railway crane and 60 wagons.

== Sections ==
In the meantime the sections have partly been made largely independent, in order to divide responsibilities better and to make it easier to be able to achieve charitable status in each country. These sections are however still linked to Eurovapor. They exist in Wutachtal (WTB e.V.), im Kandertal (Kandertalbahn e.V.) und im Emmental (Verein Historische Eisenbahn Emmental).

== Film ==
- SWR: Eisenbahn-Romantik – 35 Jahre Eurovapor (No. 271)
