= Kander Valley Railway =

Railway line in Germany

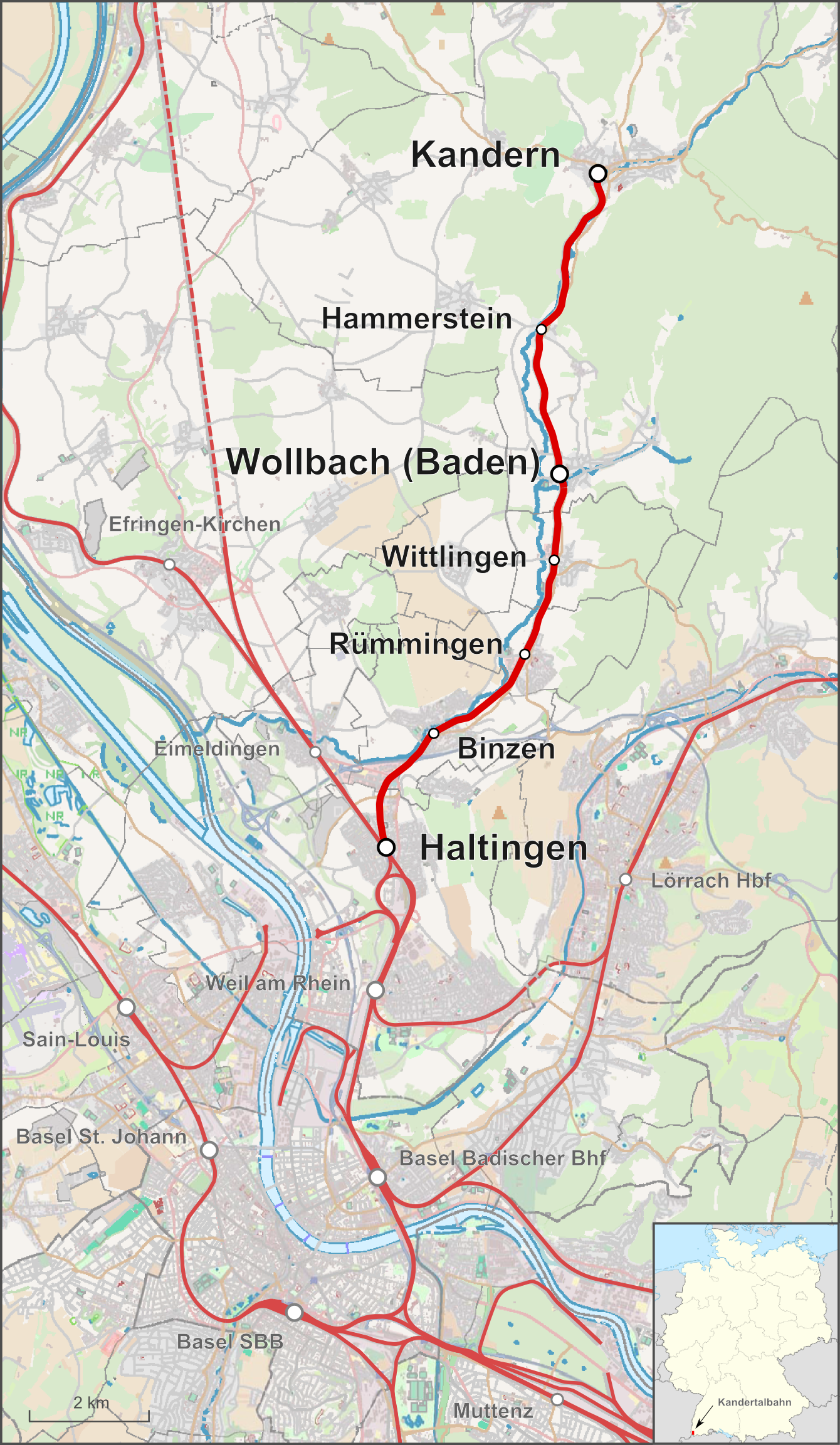

Overview
- Line number: 9440

Service
- Route number: 12733 formerly: 731

Technical
- Line length: 12.9 km
- Track gauge: 1435 mm
- Minimum radius: 200 m
- Operating speed: 30 km/h max.
- Maximum incline: 17 %

The Kander Valley Railway (German: Kandertalbahn, Alemannic: Chanderli) is a private heritage railway through the Kander valley in the southwest of the German state of Baden-Württemberg. The 13-kilometre-long branch line links Haltingen on the Rhine Valley Railway with Kandern.

== History ==
On 1 May 1895, the Kander Valley Railway was taken into service by a consortium of Vering & Waechter, Mitteldeutsche Creditbank and Moritz von Cohn. On 1 April 1899 the Deutsche Eisenbahn-Betriebsgesellschaft AG (DEBG) took over the Kander Valley Railway and ran in until 26 April 1963 when the Südwestdeutsche Verkehrs AG (SWEG) assumed operational control.

After the collapse of an embankment on 4 July 1983 near Wollbach services between Wollbach and Kandern were suspended and passenger services suspended until 31 December 1983. Goods services to Wollbach were reinstated on 1 April 1985. On 14. April 1985 the line was still officially closed.

Thereafter the Zweckverband Kandertalbahn took over the infrastructure and, since 1986, have operated a heritage railway here together with the Kandertalbahn e.V. – the owner of the railway vehicles.

The railway is still used today to transport timber. There are ideas to reactivate the line in the medium term and integrate it into the Regio S-Bahn Basel network.

== Museum operation ==
Since 1969 the Eurovapor Society has operated a heritage railway, initially with the SWEG’s historic vehicles. Following the closure of services by the SWEG, heritage services have been worked since 1986 by the Zweckverband Kandertalbahn. The vehicles themselves are owned by the Kandertalbahn Society.

The saison traditionally begins on 1 May and runs until the end of October. On Sundays, three shuttle services are operated between Kandern and Haltingen, on 1 Mai, on Ascension Day and for the Rossmärkt (stallion market) in Kandern additional trains are laid on. On 1 Mai and Ascension Day there is always a guest locomotive on duty; for the Rossmärkt, diesel railbuses operate extra services. Specials can also be booked, both with steam or diesel.

== Running and rolling stock ==
- Steam locomotive 30 (Prussian T 3, 1904) Chanderli – 1955–1966 on the Kander Valley Railway – in for a major service
- Steam locomotive 7 (formerly a monument in Staufen, 1907) – 1907–1937 on the Kander Valley Railway – actually in restoration
- Steam locomotive 8532 (E 3/3, 1915) Tigerli – stored in Kandern with boiler damage
- Steam locomotive BBÖ 378.78 (ÖBB 93.1378, 1927) – sold
- Diesel shunter V 7 (Deutz, Typ A8L 614 R, 1957) – operational, underwent major inspection 2019/20
- Diesel locomotive Em 3/3 (one off by Krupp, 1954) – operational, stored due to lack of authorization to run
- Diesel railcar VT 3 (Waggonfabrik Werdau, 1928) – Europe’s oldest operational diesel railcar
- Diesel locomotive crane No. 179 (Eisenbau Wyhlen AG, 1951) – sold

Passenger coaches from the 19th and 20th century complete the fleet.

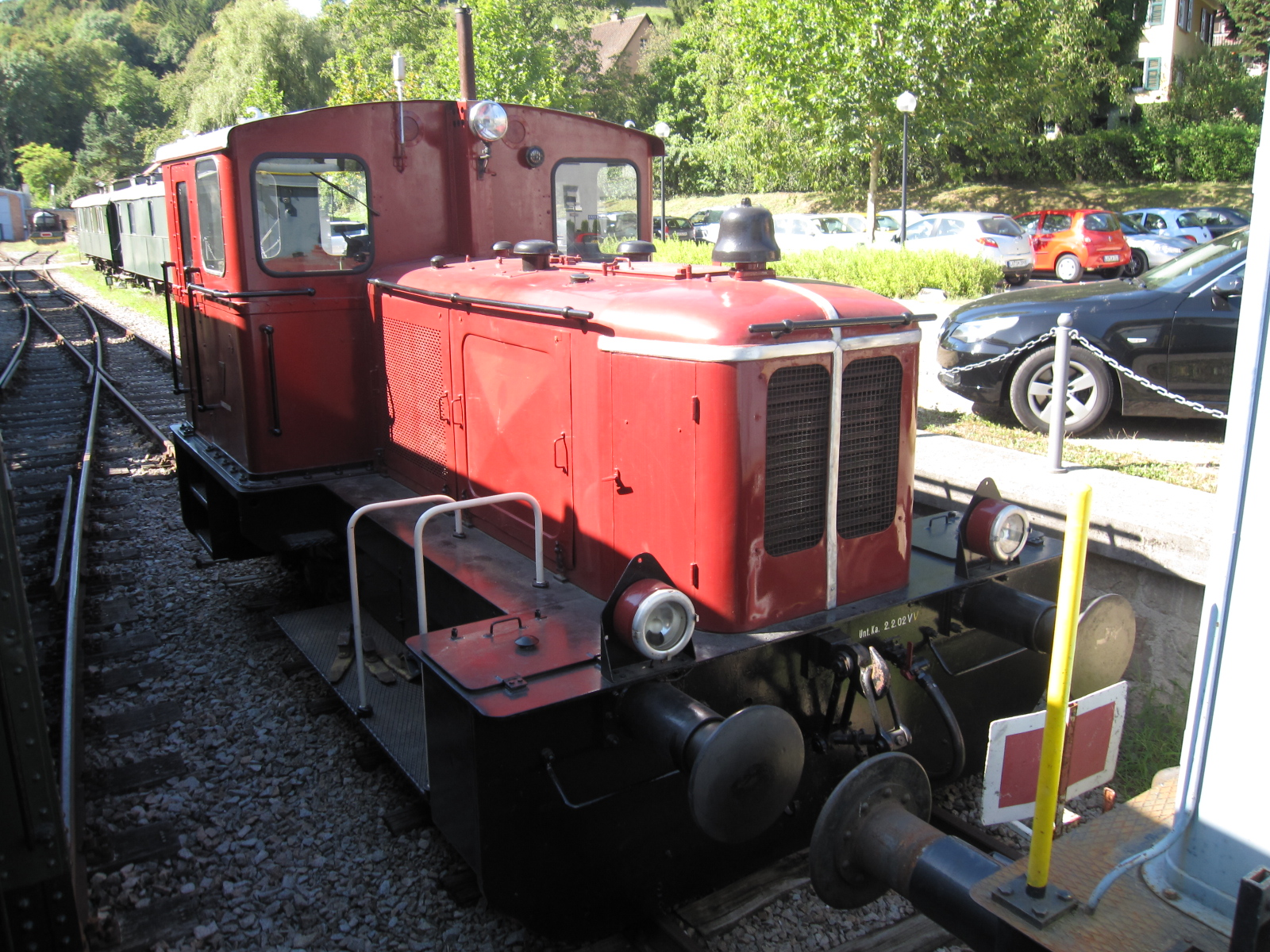
V 7 in front of Kandern station

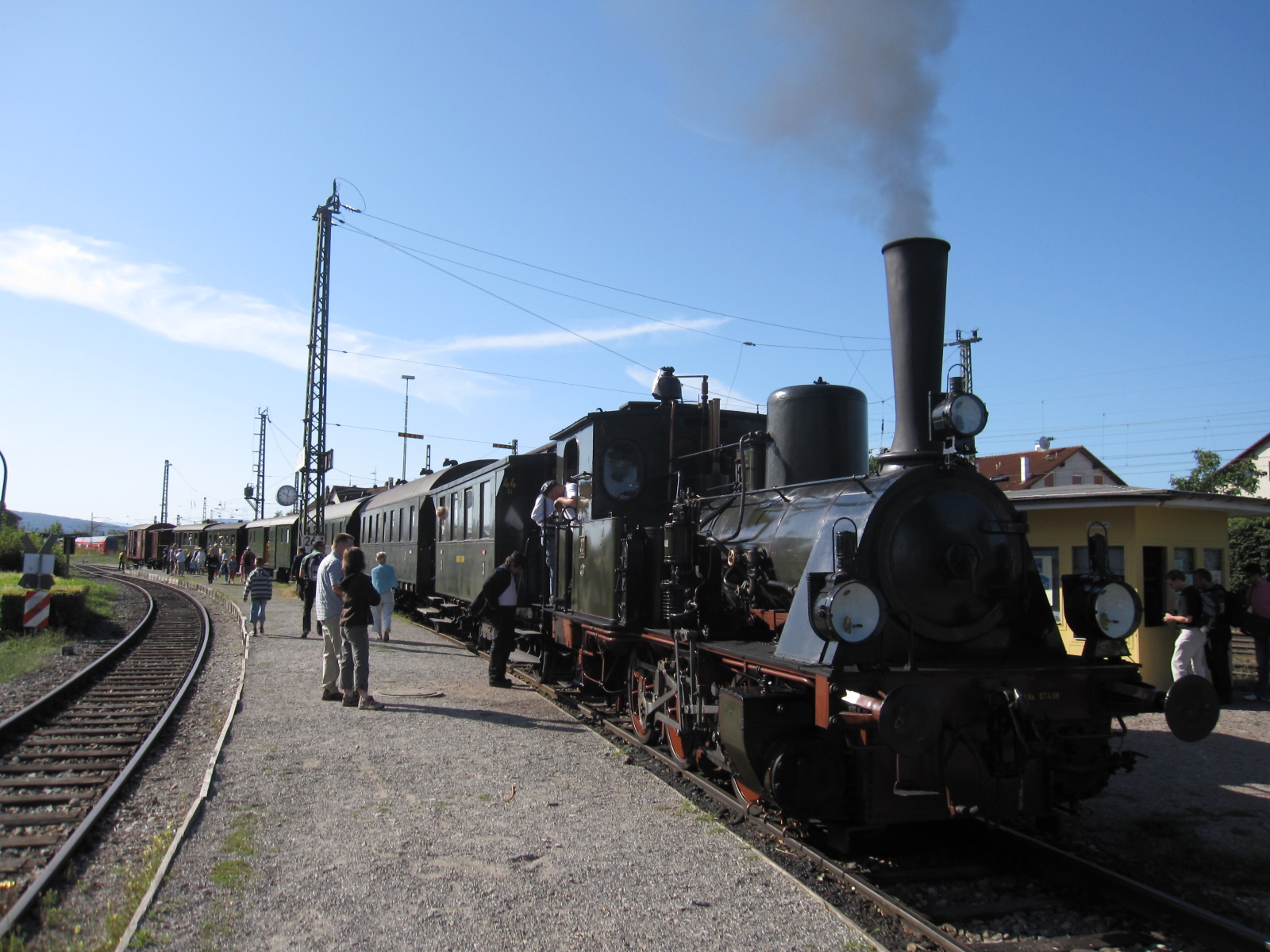
Loco no. 30 Chanderli near Haltingen

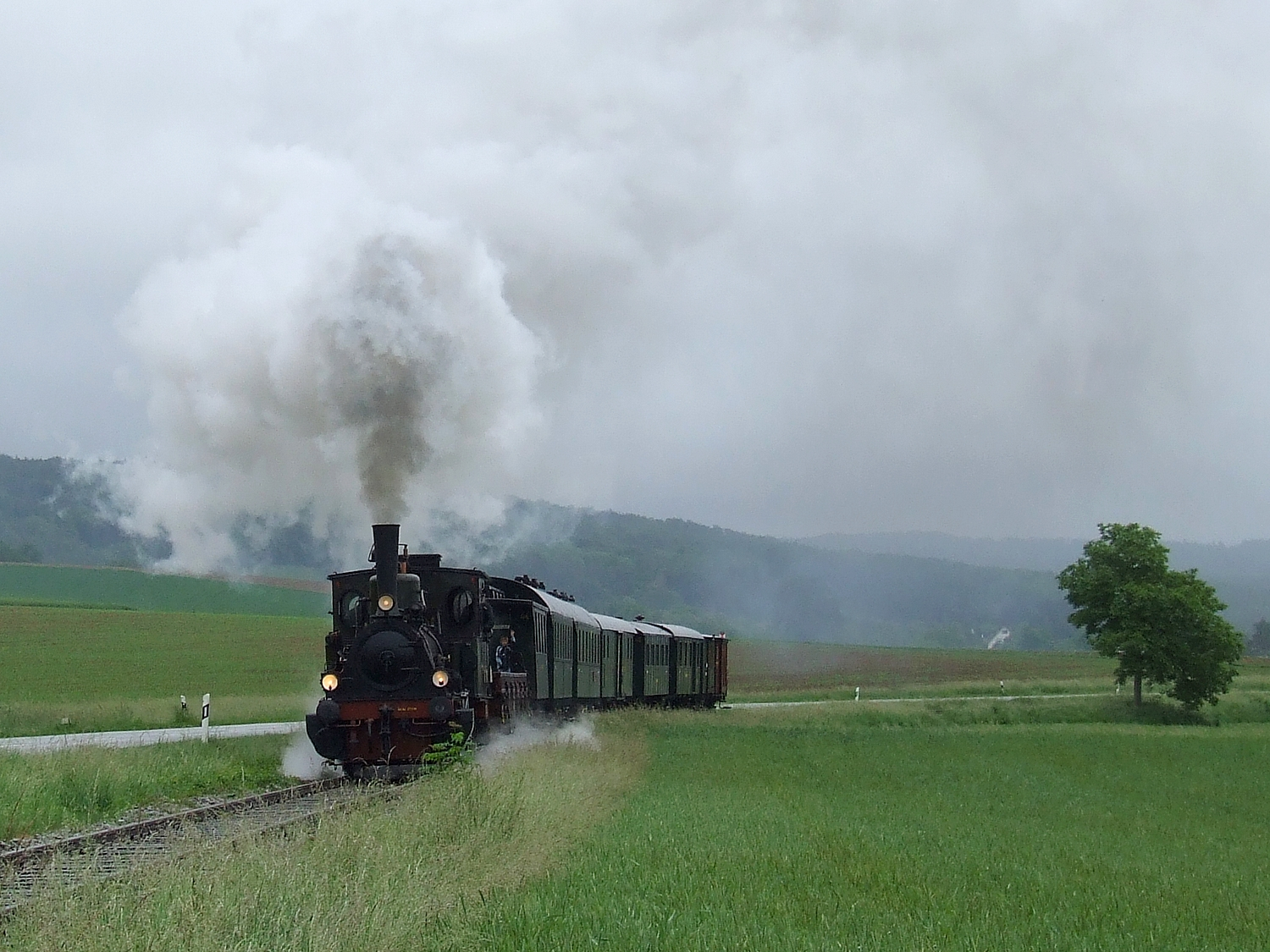
Loco. no 30 Chanderli climbing uphill shortly before Hammerstein

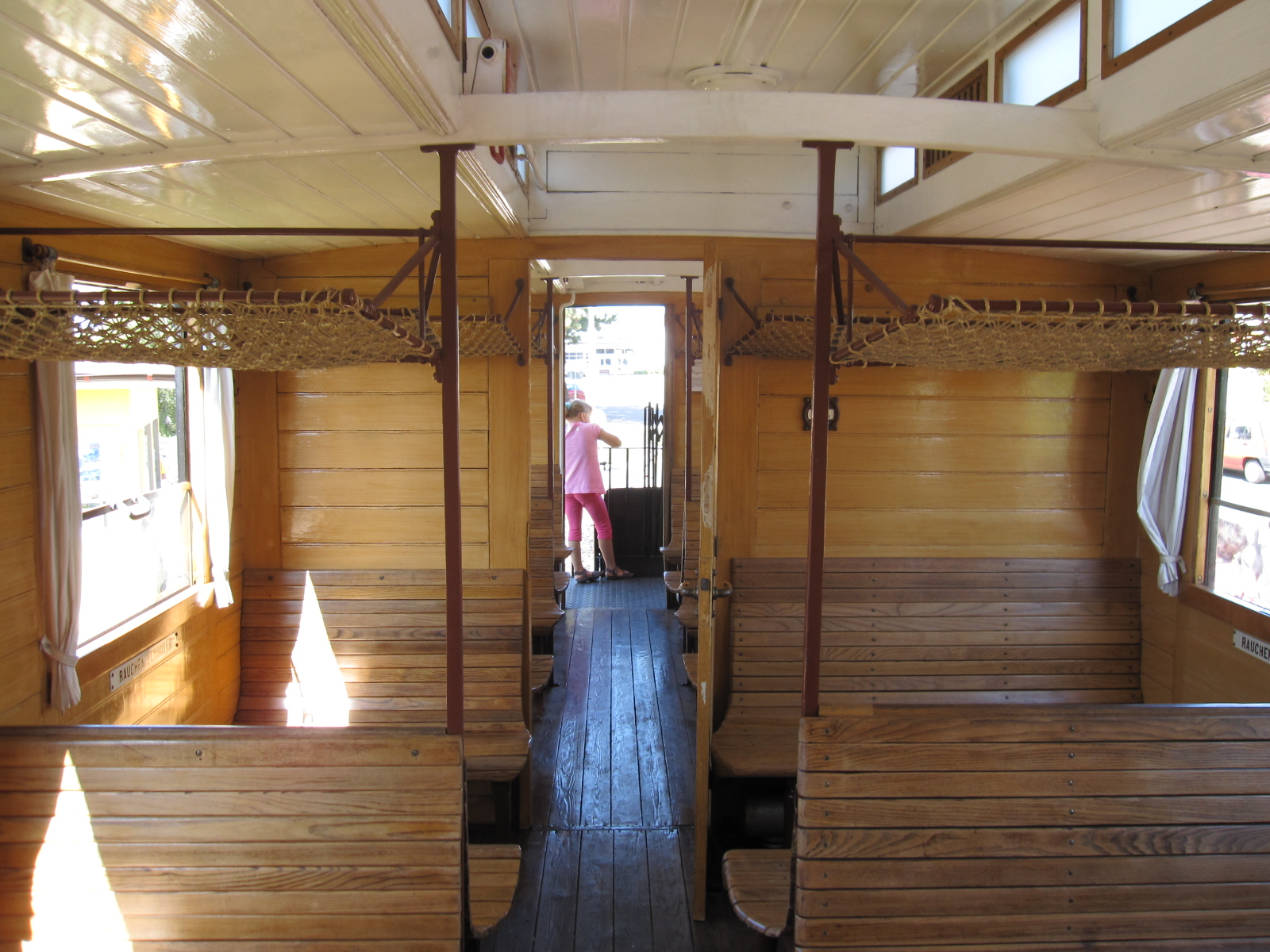
3rd class coach, Ci 44 built in 1894

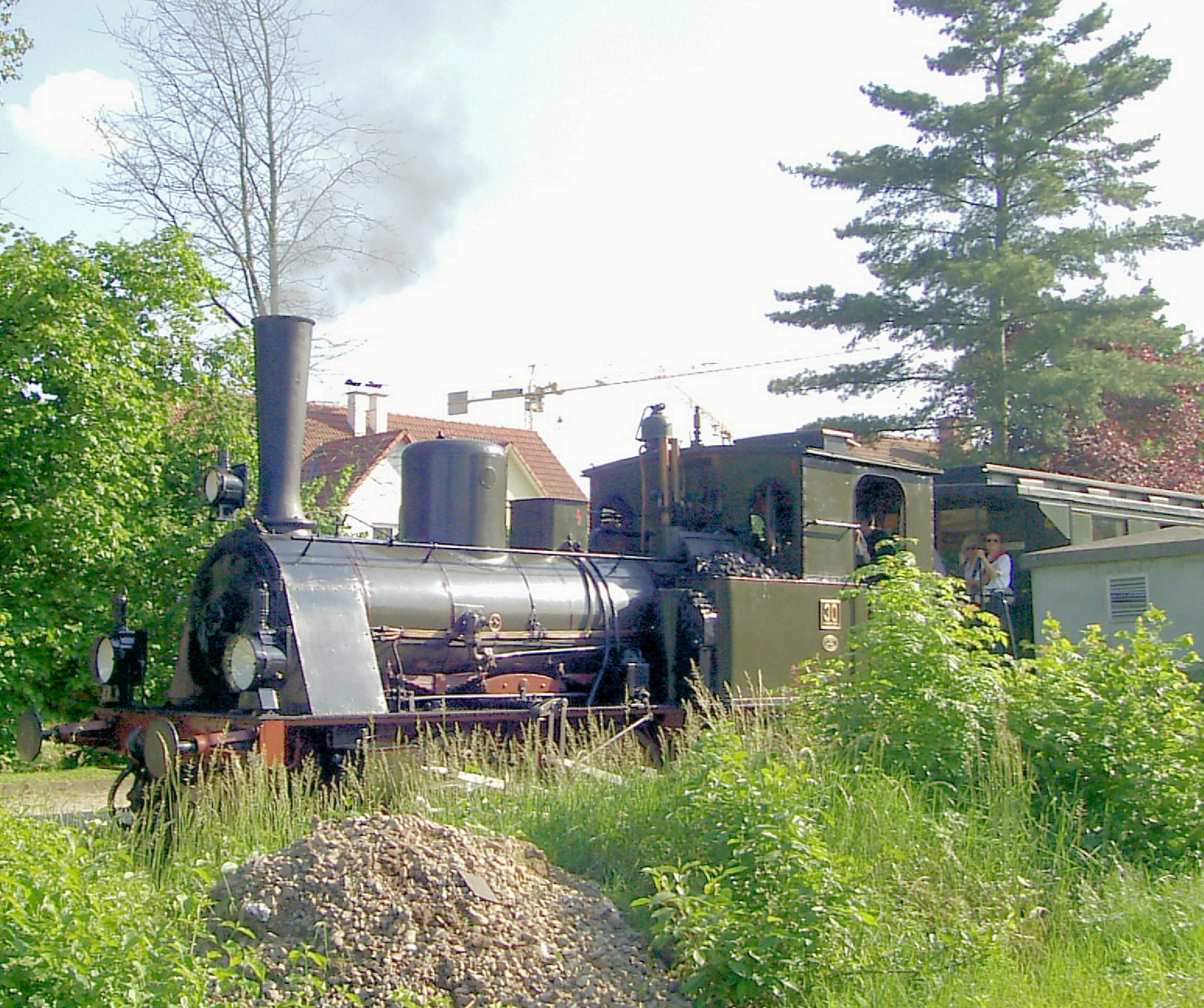
Loco no. 30 Chanderli in Binzen

== Literature ==
- Peter-Michael Mihailescu; Matthias Michalke (1985). Vergessene Bahnen in Baden-Württemberg [Forgotten tracks in Baden-Württemberg] (in German). Stuttgart: Konrad Theiss Verlag. pp. 114–117. ISBN 3-8062-0413-6.
- Renate Reimann: 100 Jahre „Chanderli“. In: Das Markgräflerland Vol. 2/1995, pp. 86–93
- Gerd Wolff; Hans-Dieter Menges (1992), Deutsche Klein- und Privatbahnen. Vol. 2: Baden (in German), Freiburg: EK-Verlag, pp. 355–363, ISBN 3-88255-653-6
