= Moritz von Cohn =

German-Jewish private banker (1812–1900)

Baron Moritz von Cohn (19 September 1812 - 29 April 1900) was a German-Jewish private banker.

Cohn was born in Wörlitz, in the Duchy of Anhalt-Dessau. As the proprietor of a private bank in Dessau, he advanced to be court-banker to the dukes of Anhalt and also over several decades administered the private fortune of the Prussian crown prince and later emperor Wilhelm I. He thus also made himself a strong financier of the capital for railroad construction, then developing in Germany. He died in Dessau, aged 87.
