= Chain boat navigation on the Main =

Example of a form of transport on the Main

Chain boat navigation on the Main was a special type of ship transport on the Main from 1886 to 1936. Along a chain laid in the river, chain boats pulled themselves upstream with several barges attached. The technology of chain shipping replaced the previous practice of towed shipping, in which the ships were pulled by horses.

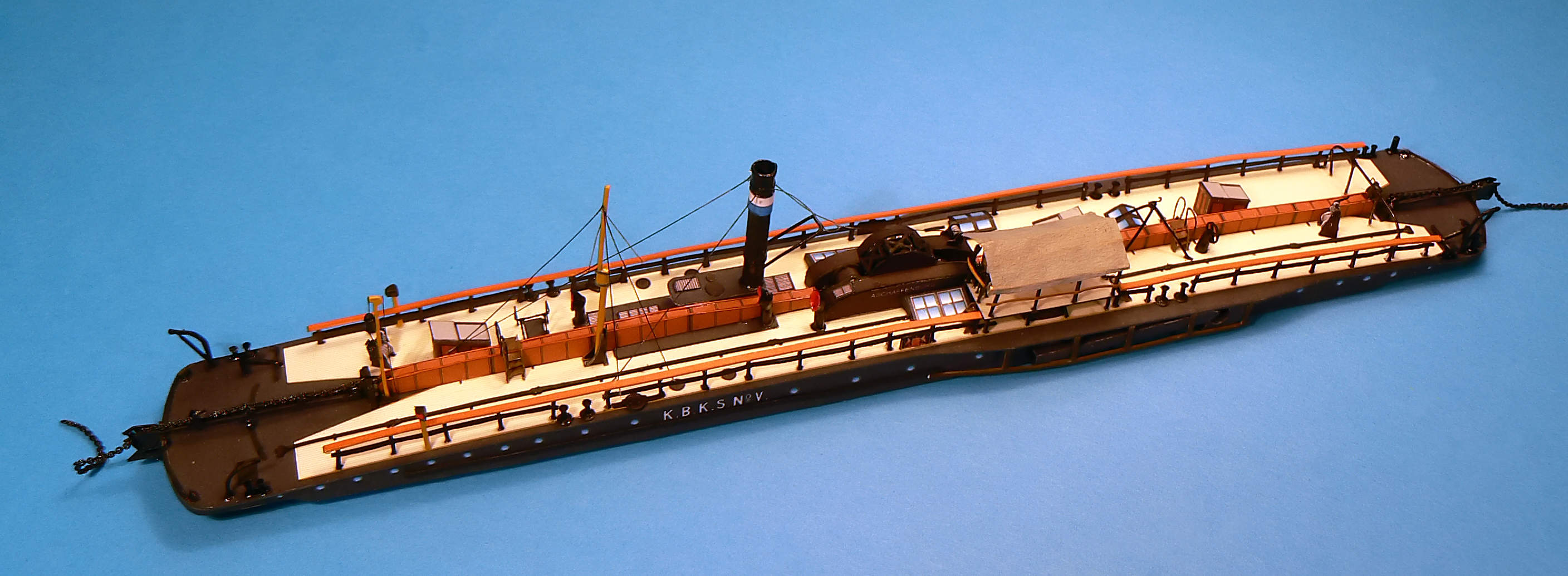
Model of the Bavarian chain boat K.B.K.S. Nr. V

As the canalisation project progressed upstream, the barrages required for this made chain towage more challenging, particularly due to the extended waiting times at the locks. This led to the emergence of a new competitor in the form of the propeller, which was made possible by the greater depth of the navigation channel. The use of diesel engines made the propeller a profitable option. The use of steam engines for the labour-intensive chain navigation became unprofitable, and this method was completely discontinued in 1936.

== History ==
=== Before chain boat navigation ===
The Main River has a relatively gentle gradient. Until the mean water level correction in the middle of the 19th century, the river was a slow-flowing shallow watercourse with numerous loops, bends, islands and, on occasion, several shallow river arms in close proximity to one another. In contrast, the occurrence of strong floods, particularly during the autumn and spring months, resulted in the flooding of areas, the erosion of riverbanks and sedimentation. Conversely, during the summer months, the water level in the channels, which were typically only half a metre deep, decreased to a few centimetres, resulting in the formation of shallows and sandbanks.

Upstream, the ship trains were towed by line riders. A typical train consisted of a chain of wooden vessels, each with a carrying capacity of 15 to 30 tonnes. They usually began with a Frankensau or a market boat and continued via Schelche, Schlumper and Nachen to the smallest vessel, the Ankernachen. The towpath often changed banks before the mouths of the tributaries or before steep slopes. At these points, horses and riders had to cross the navigation channel or be ferried across. Downstream, the ships drifted in the water current. Sails were set when the wind was favourable. The cost of towing the mostly empty or lightly loaded ships was high. Therefore, profit could usually only be made when the fairway was sufficiently deep and with fully loaded ships travelling downstream.

In 1828, the Stadt Frankfurt was the inaugural paddle steamer to traverse the Main between Mainz and Frankfurt. However, the venture was unsuccessful due to design flaws in the steam engine and the challenging navigation conditions in the heavily silted Main estuary. The trials were terminated as early as 1832. It was not until 1841, following the Free City of Frankfurt's accession to the German Customs Union and the completion of the Taunus Railway line from Frankfurt to Wiesbaden, that steam navigation on the Main resumed. However, it was unable to establish itself for several reasons. Firstly, the unfavourable fairways of the Main at low water levels during the summer months presented a challenge for steamboats with their relatively large draught, particularly given that the promised fairway improvements from the Bavarian state were not implemented to the desired extent. Secondly, the railway, which was constructed at the same time, was more efficient than steamships. It was able to travel at faster speeds and had shorter routes. The waterway from Mainz to Schweinfurt was 88 per cent longer. Furthermore, the railway was able to bypass customs offices, eliminating the need for lengthy waiting periods. It was also exempt from customs duties and tariffs, reducing its financial burden. As early as 1858, the unprofitability of steam navigation with paddle steamers led to the discontinuation of this mode of transport.

=== The time of chain boats on the Main ===
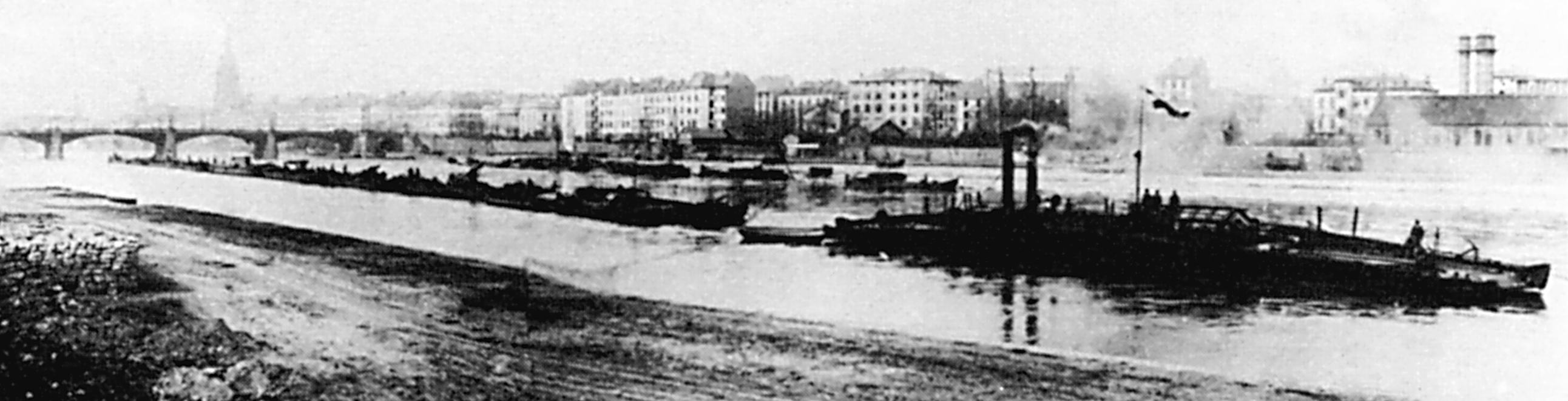
Chain boat tow on the Main (ca. 1896)

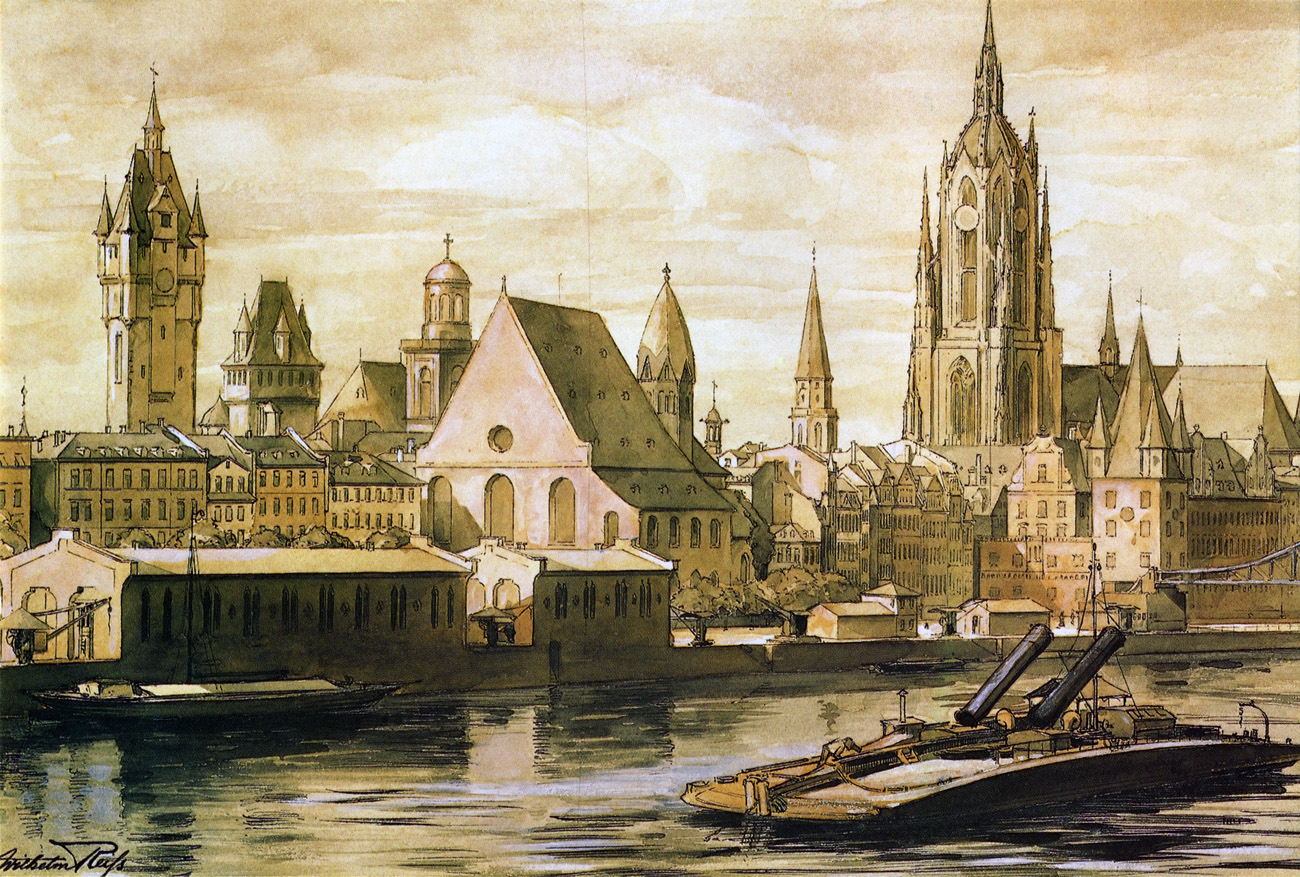
Chain boat of the Mainkette-AG in front of the "Mainkai" in Frankfurt

After navigation on the Main had lost more and more of its transport capacity to the railway and the use of wheeled steam tugs had failed due to the shallow navigation channel of the Main, Heino Held, owner of the Mainz-based forwarding and coal trading company C.J.H. Held & Cie., had the idea of saving navigation by introducing chain tug navigation. On 15 February 1871, he applied to the authorities in Prussia, Bavaria and Hesse for a corresponding licence, encouraged by the companies that had just started up on the Elbe. In 1872, the various states and towns along the Main then established a committee in Aschaffenburg. The committee was supported by Ewald Bellingrath, who had already played a leading role in the introduction of chain navigation on the Elbe and Neckar rivers. The committee discussed the merits of chain shipping and the canalisation of the Main. Mainz, which was part of the Grand Duchy of Hesse, was in favour of chain shipping as it feared that the canalisation of the Main would allow Rhine ships to bring their goods directly to Frankfurt, which would result in Mainz losing its position as a transfer point. Frankfurt, which was then part of Prussia, sought to become a Rhine port and only agreed to the chain once the canalisation to Frankfurt had been completed. The Bavarian state parliament was also opposed to the chain, citing concerns about competition for the Bavarian state railway. Initially, it only approved the chain as far as Aschaffenburg.

In 1885, the Hessian joint-stock company Mainkette-AG was granted a concession to operate chain shipping on the Main and through the Rhine to the port of Mainz. The Mainkette-AG laid the chain and the chain boats were built at the Neckar shipyard in Neckarsulm in 1886. The plans for the construction were provided by the company Gebr. Sachsenberg from Roßlau (Elbe), which had already gained many years of experience with the construction of chain boats and also supplied the entire machinery for travelling with the chain to the Neckar. From the Neckar to the Main, the chain ships could be transported directly by water, which would not have been possible from the Elbe. The chain ships were capable of pulling themselves and up to ten attached barges at speeds of around five kilometres per hour.

The line between Mainz and Aschaffenburg was inaugurated on 7 August 1886. By October of that year, all three chain boats (Mainkette I-III) were operational on this route. The Fränkische Kurier published a review of the early days of chain navigation:

That was the time when one day the "chain boat" surprised the villages and towns. What a cheer back then! As if an ocean liner had come up the Rhine and Main! [...] Metre by metre, the chain rose from the depths, dripping like an iron snake, rolled across the deck, crawled away, and suddenly it was back again to disappear into the wet element. And the children and old people stood and marvelled.

— Die Letzte Fahrt der „Mainkuh“,

In the following years, Mainkette-AG expanded its fleet of ships with three screw steam tugs. Initially, these were used mainly as feeder boats in Mainz-Kostheim and Frankfurt. However, they were then increasingly used for towing services between Mainz and Frankfurt itself.

The Main with the most important places

In 1892, the Bavarian government granted the Mainkette-AG's repeated request to extend its chain to Miltenberg, subject to the proviso that it could be cancelled at any time. However, just two years later, the Bavarian government passed a law to establish its own chain navigation on the Main, with the chain being extended to Lohr in the summer of 1895. In the absence of its own chain tugs, the Mainkette-AG was authorised to operate on this section of the river in return for a chain usage fee. From 1895 to 1901, the Hessian Mainkette-AG continued to operate its chain boats on the Bavarian sections of the river as far as Miltenberg or Lohr.

In 1898, the Bavarian kingdom established the Königlich Bayerische Kettenschleppschiffahrt-Gesellschaft (KBKS) in Würzburg, which was managed by the Bavarian state railway. The newly established state company was tasked with constructing five chain tug boats, designated K.B.K.S. No. I to V, at the Übigau shipyard in Dresden. The boats were prefabricated at the shipyard, transported by rail to Aschaffenburg, and then riveted together and launched between 1898 and 1900.

The Bavarian state built a shipyard near Schweinheim for maintaining its chain ships. It is located below river kilometre 88.8 between the banks of the Main and the former Mainländebahn railway.

However, following the deployment of all new Bavarian chain boats, the Hessian Mainkette-AG was forced to withdraw from Bavaria. The Königlich Bayerische Kettenschleppschiffahrt-Gesellschaft purchased the chain between Aschaffenburg and Miltenberg from the Mainkette-AG and extended it in the following years: 1900 to Kitzingen, 1911 to Schweinfurt and 1912 to Bamberg. The chain reached its greatest length of 396 kilometres. In 1910 and 1911, three additional boats, designated K.B.K.S. No. VI to VIII, were prefabricated in Übigau and assembled in Aschaffenburg. From 1912, eight Bavarian chain tugs were thus travelling between Aschaffenburg and Bamberg.

The chain boats were mostly only used for travelling uphill. In 1900, the Aschaffenburger Zeitung described the situation of chain navigation as follows:

In the month of June, the royal Bavarian chain ships transported 430 vehicles with a carrying capacity of 24,568 tonnes and 4,706 tonnes of cargo upstream in 22 tows. Downstream they towed 4 vehicles with a carrying capacity of 467 tonnes and 28 tonnes of cargo. The revenue for this totalled 8,026 M., 70 Pf.

— Aschaffenburger Zeitung,

Following the abdication of King Ludwig III in 1918, the designation K.B.K.S. (Königlich Bayerisches Kettenschiff) was amended to remove the first 'K.' for 'Königlich'. Consequently, the ship number eight was no longer referred to as K.B.K.S.NoVIII, but simply B.K.S.NoVIII. (Bayerisches Kettenschiff Nummero acht). In 1924, the designation was changed to DRG. KS NrVIII (Deutsche Reichsbahn-Gesellschaft Kettenschiff Nummer acht). Following the 1937 takeover by the Deutsche Reichsbahn, the designation was changed to DR.KS NrVIII (Deutsche Reichsbahn Kettenschiff Nummer 8).

=== The end of chain navigation ===
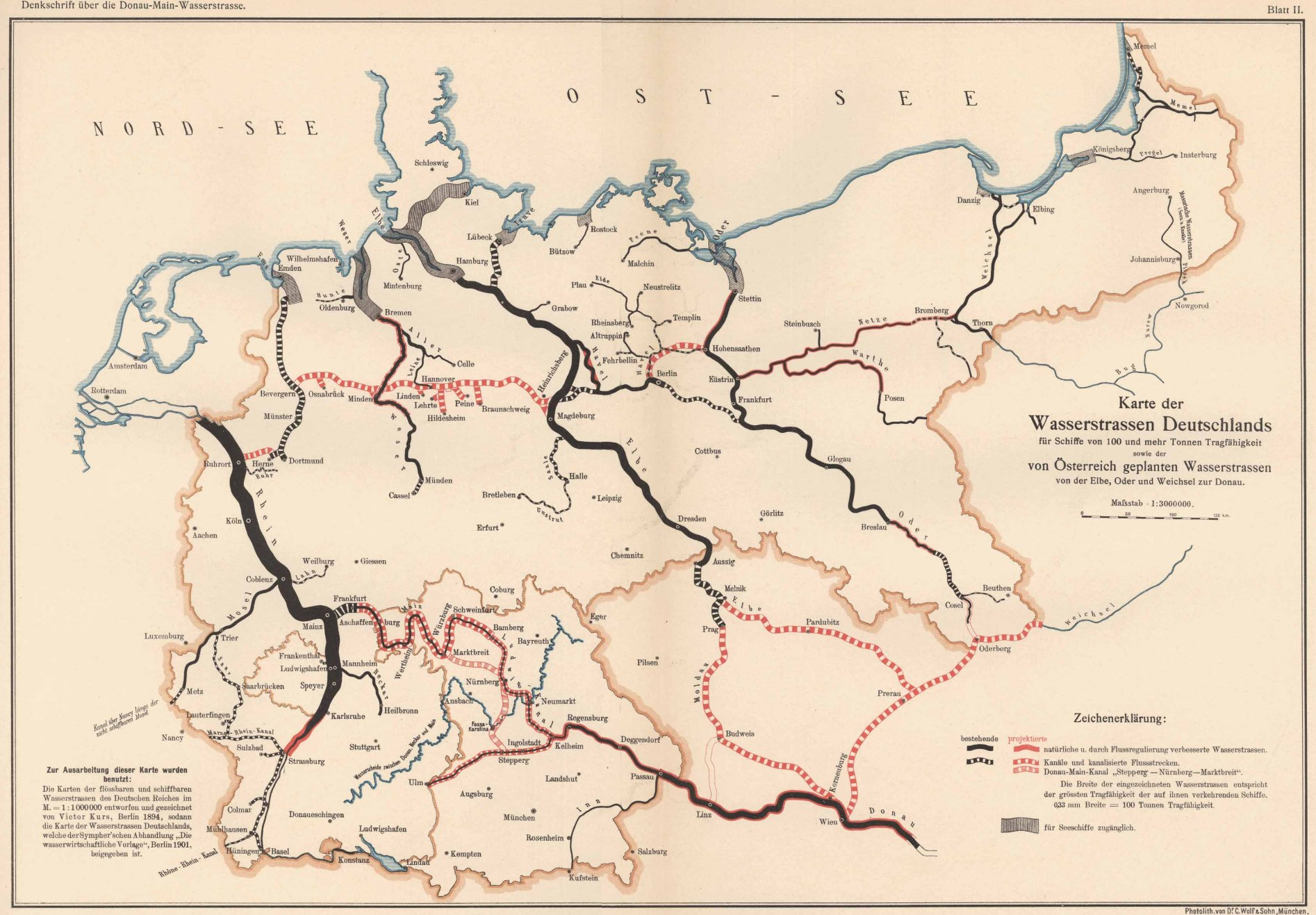
Existing and planned waterways in Germany, 1903.

As the people of Frankfurt were initially interested in the canalisation of the Main as far as their city, the Bavarian state now showed great interest in the canalisation of the Main as far as Aschaffenburg. All goods, in particular the Ruhr coal required to operate the Bavarian state railways, were to be transported there by ship, stockpiled, stored and distributed. This did not affect the state-owned Bavarian chain shipping company operating upstream on the Main, but the Mainz-based company Mainkette-AG had to bear the consequences. The damming of the river led to a greater water depth and, at the same time, a reduction in the flow speed. In particular, the long tows had to be split up at the locks of the barrages and sluiced separately. This could result in delays of up to five hours, as the barges had to be manhandled into and out of the locks.

The shift in profitability from chain shipping to propeller-driven vessels was significant. With the progressive canalisation of the Main as far as Aschaffenburg in 1921, the Mainkette-AG was only able to use its screw-driven boats economically and ceased tugboat operations entirely in the early 1930s.

In 1935, the Nuremberg Reichsbahn Directorate also had to state the following for the Bavarian route: "The volume of traffic on the chain tugboat service on the Main has declined extraordinarily in the first half of this year [1935] due to competition from screw boats, so that operations have almost come to a standstill and the question of completely closing down the company must be considered." The reason given for this was:

The screw tugs benefit from the fact that they are considerably cheaper to purchase and operate than the chain boats, despite the greater engine power required. A motorised screw tug of the same power as the chain tugs requires only half the operating crew (3 instead of 6). The entire capital expenditure for the chain and its renewal is eliminated. The screw tugs can also navigate the locks more quickly and easily than the chain boats, and there are no chain breakages. Another significant economic advantage in light traffic is that, as smaller units, they do not have to wait for a large train of ships to arrive and can therefore serve the traffic more quickly, and they can also transport according to the new traffic task that now arises in the water flowing at a much lower current downstream, thus utilising the downstream journey. [...] In addition to the tugboats, motorised barges have also recently been coming up from the Rhine, which therefore require neither screw tugs nor chain tugs.

— Mainschiffahrtsnachrichten 11,

Another disadvantage of chain dragging was the sideways movement of the chain across the river bed, which could result in the chain being pulled into the inside of the bend. This resulted in the chain occasionally dragging large stones into the navigation channel or edging up stones already in place. Furthermore, the chain was not returned to its original position each time it was lifted.

Bavarian chain navigation was completely discontinued in July 1936 and the chain was lifted in 1938. On 14 May 1938, the Fränkische Kurier described the last voyage of a chain boat on the Main:

The 'Mainkuh' has started its last journey to Bamberg in Aschaffenburg. The whole journey will be a single farewell, because her chain is now leaving the river forever, and everywhere on the Main, not just in the well-known old shipping towns and villages [...] a thousand memories are linked with this Main chain and its 'chain boats'. The Mää-, the Maa-, the Meekuh, as the chain tugboat was christened upstream on the Main, is known to every child on the Main. Even today. But tomorrow it will be part of the history of Main navigation.

— Die Letzte Fahrt der „Mainkuh“,

== The name Mainkuh ==
The chain tow had priority over other ships in front of dangerous river sections. These had to turn round and allow the towed convoy to pass. To warn the other ships, the chain ships emitted a loud whistle signal well in advance. Such a signal was also sounded before ships were coupled or uncoupled. If a towed convoy passed the home harbour of the chain tug or one of the barges, signals were also given. The families of the skippers were aware of the convoy's arrival and were able to provide provisions, clothing, and news via small boats, known as "Nachen." The tooting of the chain boats, which sounded like a loud mooing, and the loud rattling of the chains, reminiscent of a cowshed, led to the common name Mainkuh, or, depending on the dialect and pronunciation, the Lower Franconian Määkuh, Meekuh, Frankfurter Maakuh or Meankuh.

== Technical description ==
The chain boats travelled on a chain laid in the riverbed, which was only fixed in the river at the beginning and end. The bar-less chain consisted of iron links 118 mm long, 85 mm wide and 26 mm thick. The chain's own weight and its natural entanglement with the river bed meant that it could exert a tensile force of around 40,000 newtons (equivalent to around 4,000 kg). Extensions (booms) were attached to the bow and stern of the ship, which could be swung sideways in either direction. The chain was taken out of the river bed via the front boom and guided above deck along the ship's axis to the chain drive in the centre of the ship. Guide rollers ensured that the chain was accurately aligned. From there, the chain ran across the deck to the boom at the stern and back into the river. Thanks to the lateral mobility of the boom and the two rudders mounted fore and aft, it was possible to lower the chain back to the centre of the river, even when the river bent.

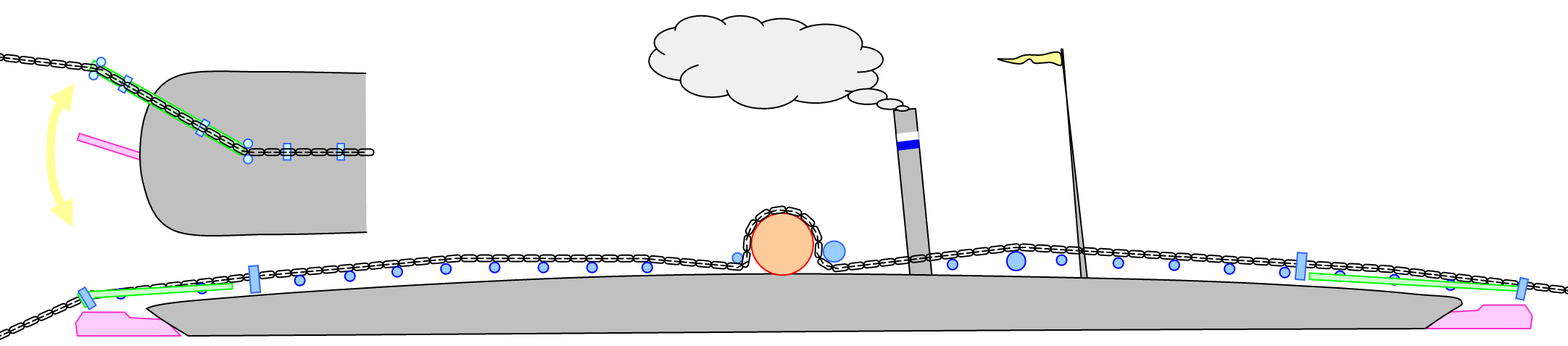
Schematic representation of the chain run on the Bavarian chain ships: Boom (green), rudder (violet), guide rollers (blue), drive roller (red)

Eduard Weiß, writing in the journal of the Association of German Engineers, described the ships as follows: "The appearance of the ship is peculiar in that it is highest in the middle and slopes too much towards the ends to minimise the loss of work caused by the lifting of the towing chain". This shape is typical of all chain tugs and is optimised for shallow water. The deeper the water, the lower the efficiency, as more and more energy is required to lift the chain from the bottom.

3D reconstructions of the Bavarian chain boat K.B.K.S. No. V

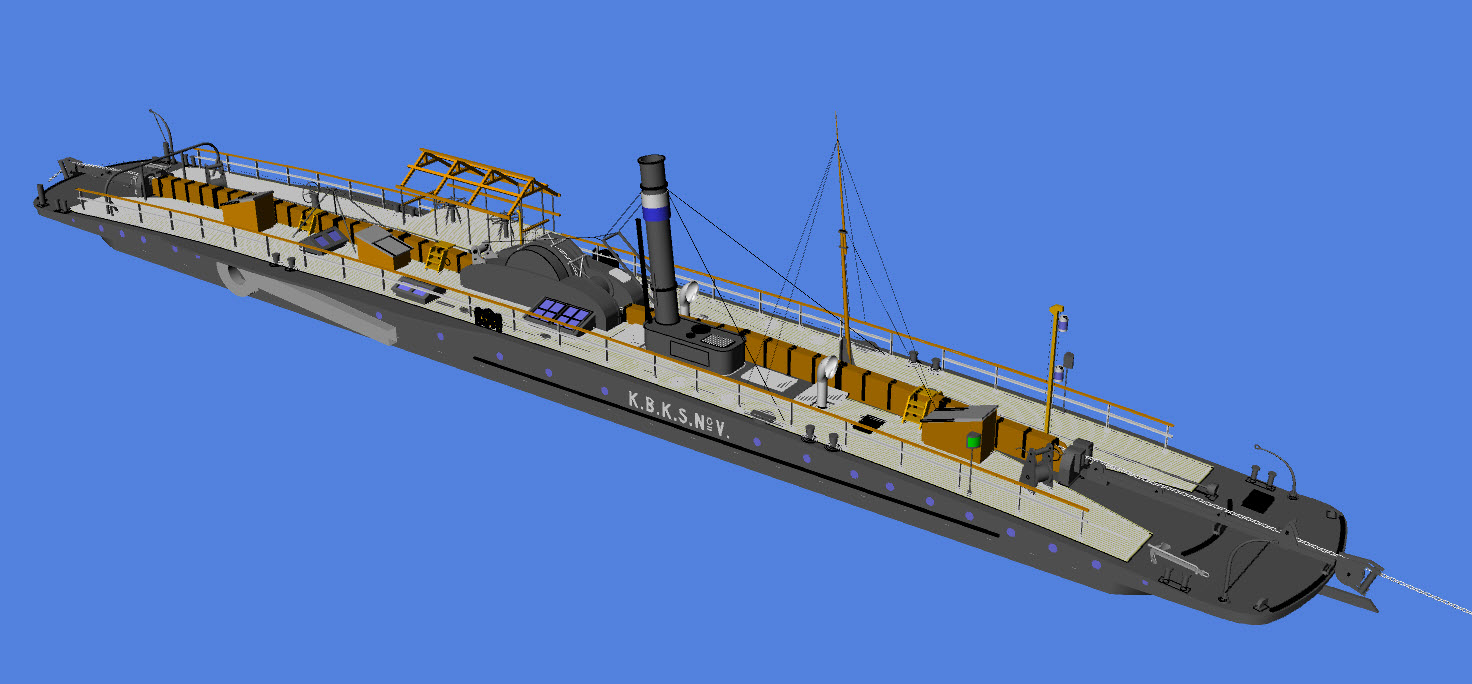
Total view

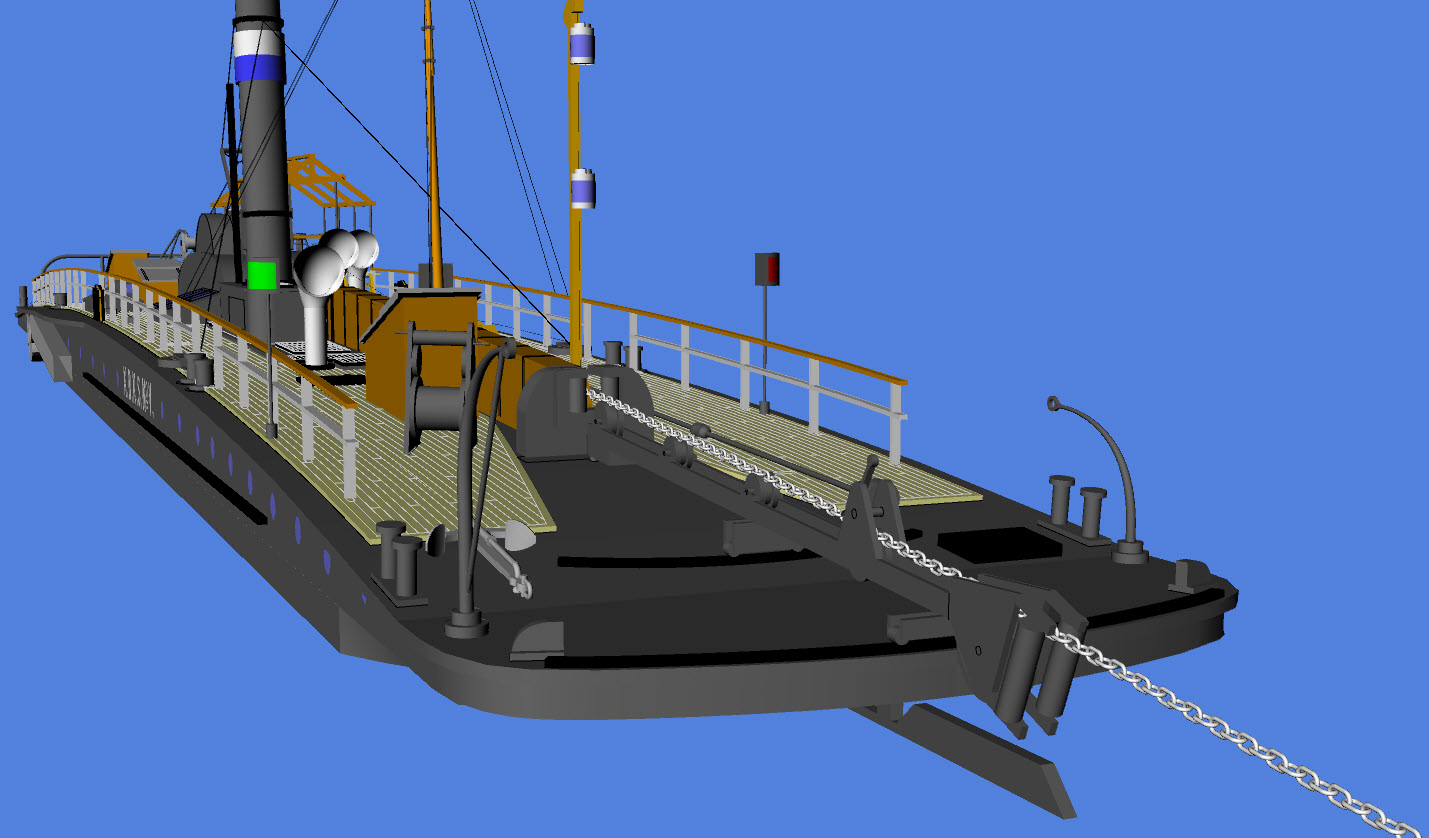
Bow view with boom

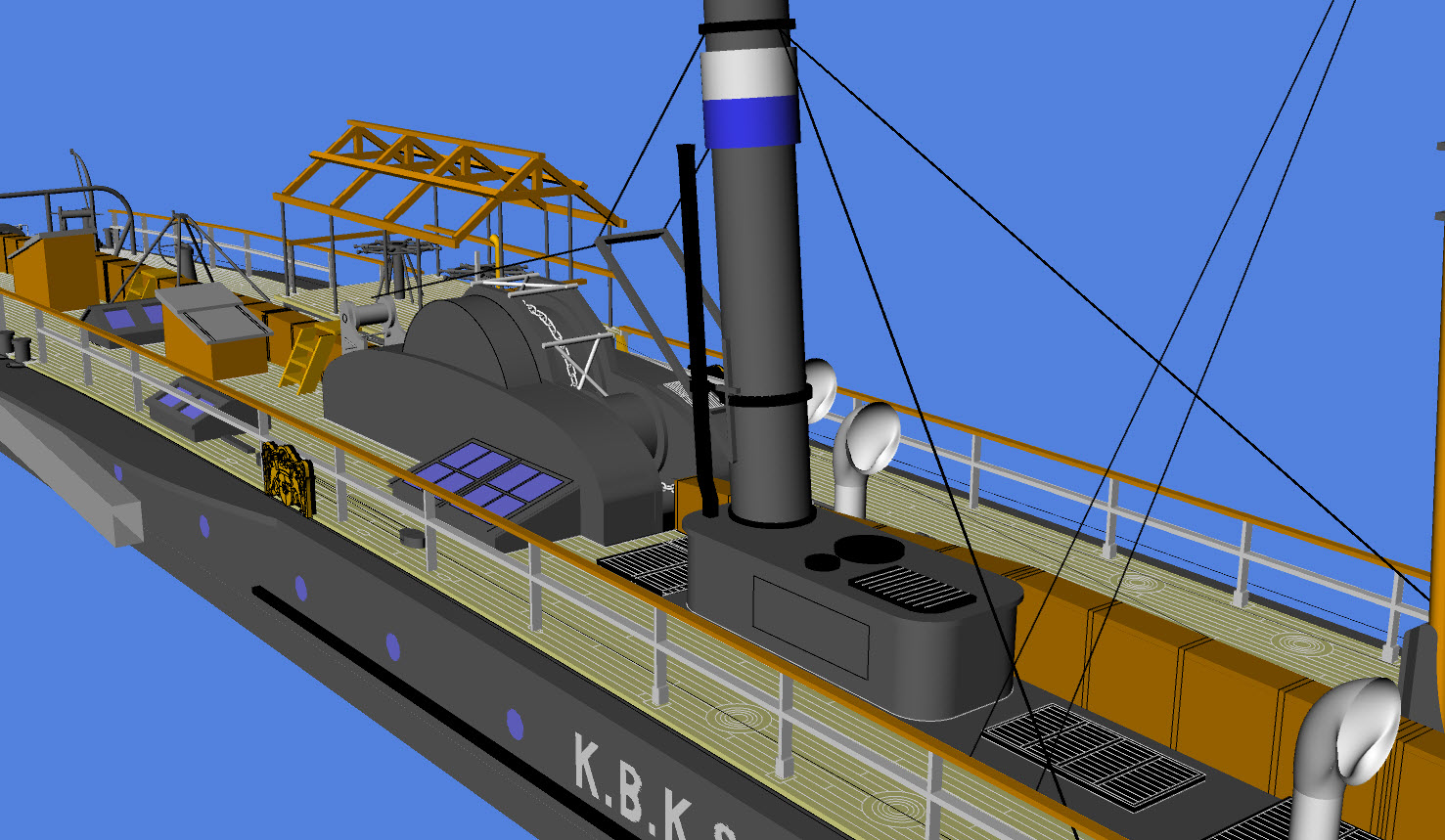
View of the centre aisle

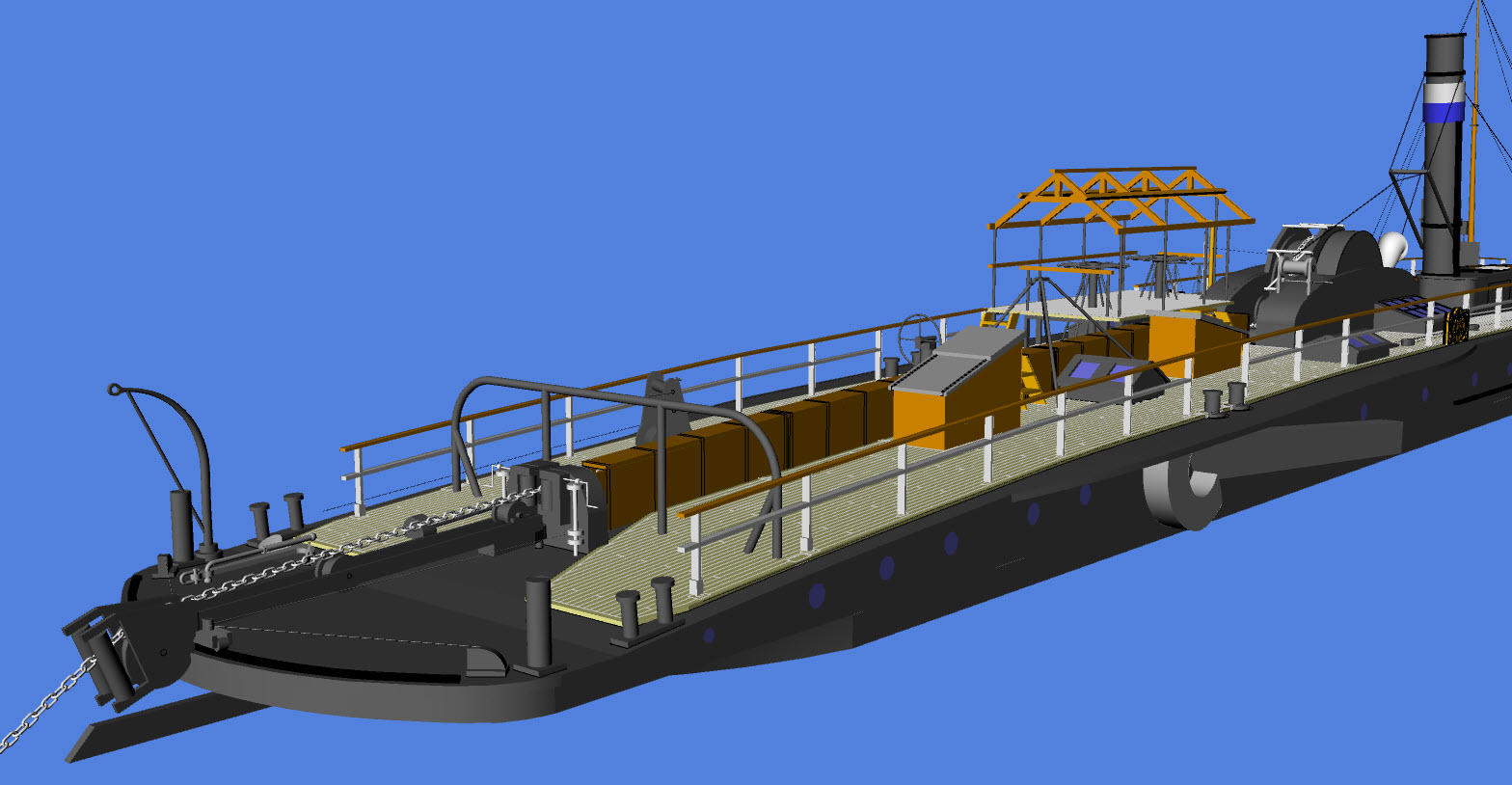
Stern view with boom

The chain lasted about 10 to 15 years. Due to the abrasive effect of the sand between the links, the chain broke more frequently. To prevent the chain from being fished up from the bottom using search anchors, catching devices in the form of locking hooks were fitted to the ships' booms to prevent the chain from running away after a chain breakage or while the chain was being repaired.

=== The chain ships of Hesse ===
The three Hessian ships, designated Mainkette I-III, had a length above deck of 49.80 metres and a breadth at the waterline of 7.05 metres. Apart from the chain drive in the form of a drum winch, they had no other independent propulsion. These ships were therefore dependent on the chain to move up and down the river. Ships meeting had to pass each other in a complicated manoeuvre. First, the chain had to be opened at shackles (called "chain locks") spaced 400 metres apart in the chain. Using an auxiliary chain and rope, the downstream ship had to leave the chain and anchor. Once the vessel travelling against the current had passed, the downstream vessel could re-enter the chain with a time loss of approximately 45 minutes.

The draught with 20 tonnes of coal on board was 0.60 metres. The ships were powered by an 88 kW (120 hp) steam engine. Typical of this type of ship were two funnels placed side by side. This was because the ship had two boilers, each with one fire. The coal consumption per hour was 3 hundredweights (150 kg).

=== The Bavarian chain ships ===
The Bavarian chain boats with the designations K.B.K.S. No. I-V were constructed in Übigau and, at 50 metres above deck (equivalent to 46.80 metres at the waterline), were slightly longer than the vessels of the Mainkette-AG. However, the width at the waterline was smaller at 6.40 metres (width above deck 7.40 metres). With a draught of only 0.56 metres, they had a displacement of 147 cubic metres, which equates to their weight in tonnes. With a propulsion power of 95 kW (130 hp) provided by a steam engine, they were able to pull up to 12 barges.

The Bavarian chain boats, designated K.B.K.S. No. VI-VIII, were slightly longer at the waterline than the previous version, at 48.00 metres. However, the width at the waterline remained unchanged at 6.40 metres. The steam engines on these ships were capable of 80 kW (110 hp) of propulsion power. Until 1924, the chain grip-wheel used for power transmission was manufactured by Bellingrath. Subsequently, a two-wheel chain wheel was used, around which the chain was looped.

A distinctive feature of the Bavarian ships was the incorporation of two water turbines, designed by Gustav Anton Zeuner, which served as precursors to the modern water jet propulsion system. This enabled the ship to be steered and to travel downhill without a chain at a speed of approximately 14 kilometres per hour. The additional drive also permitted directional corrections to be made while travelling on the chain, as well as facilitating turning manoeuvres.

The Bavarian chain ships were equipped with a single chimney. This feature can be folded down if required. The hull was divided into seven compartments, each separated by a watertight bulkhead. The crew consisted of the captain, a helmsman, two sailors, an engineer and two stokers. The sleeping quarters and cabins were situated on the lower deck. The steering platform was covered with a canvas cover and a sun/rain sail was stretched over it. The steering position was subsequently converted into a wheelhouse.

== Model ships ==
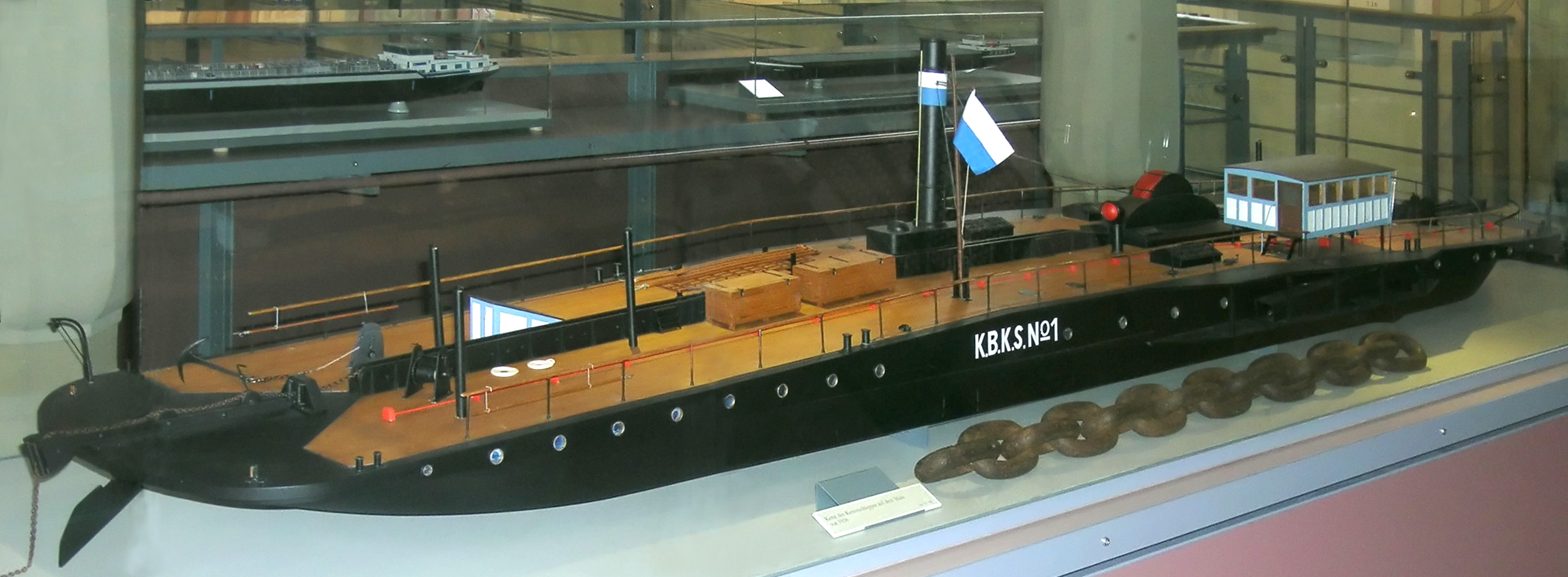
Chain boat with part of the original chain in the Wörth Maritime Museum

A model of a chain boat is on display at the Wörth am Main Maritime and Shipbuilding Museum, along with a piece of the original chain. Additionally, there is a 1:5 scale model of a double winch that winds and unwinds the chain at the touch of a button. A second model of a chain boat is on display in the meeting room of Wörth town hall and can be loaned to other museums and exhibitions if required.

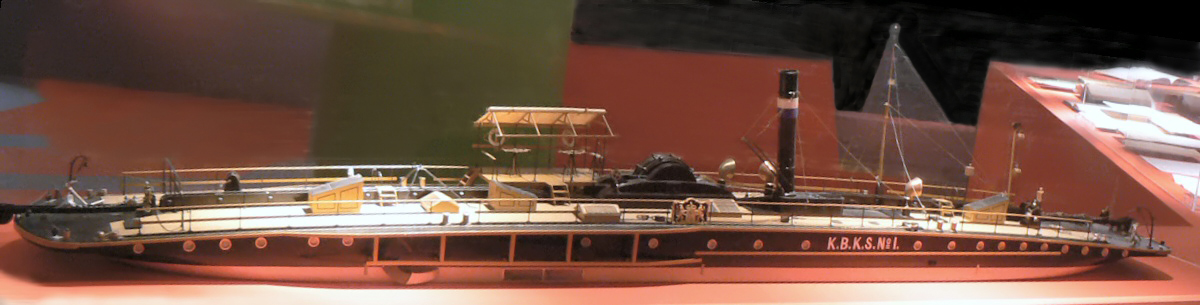
Chain ship K.B.K.S. No.I in the Nuremberg Transport Museum

The model of a chain tugboat on display at the local history museum in Elsenfeld allows the chain to be moved on the model. Additionally, the museum displays an original ship's bell from the Royal Bavarian Chain Steamship No. 4 and a piece of the original chain. Please note that the museum is only open a few days a year.

The Museum Stadt Miltenberg and the Schlossmuseum Aschaffenburg also have a model of a chain ship. A piece of the original chain can also be seen in Aschaffenburg.

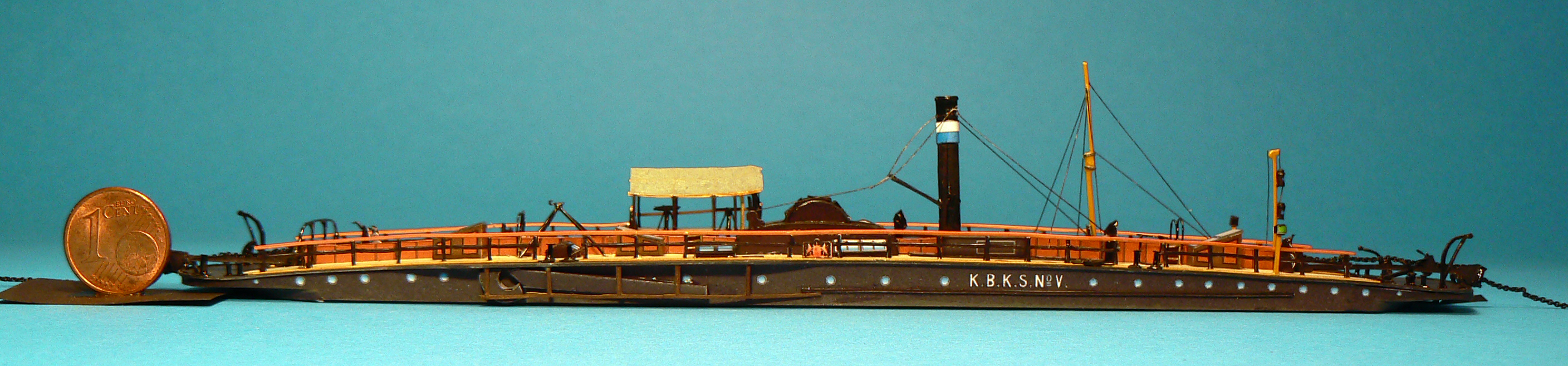
Cardboard model of the chain ship K.B.K.S. No.V

Another model (a shipyard model of the K.B.K.S. No. I on a scale of 1:25) is in the possession of the DB Museum in Nuremberg. However, this was only rarely exhibited at the museum. Since April 2010, the model has been on permanent loan in the Guild Hall of Aschaffenburg Castle.

The K.B.K.S. No. V chain ship is also available as a 1:250 scale cardboard model.

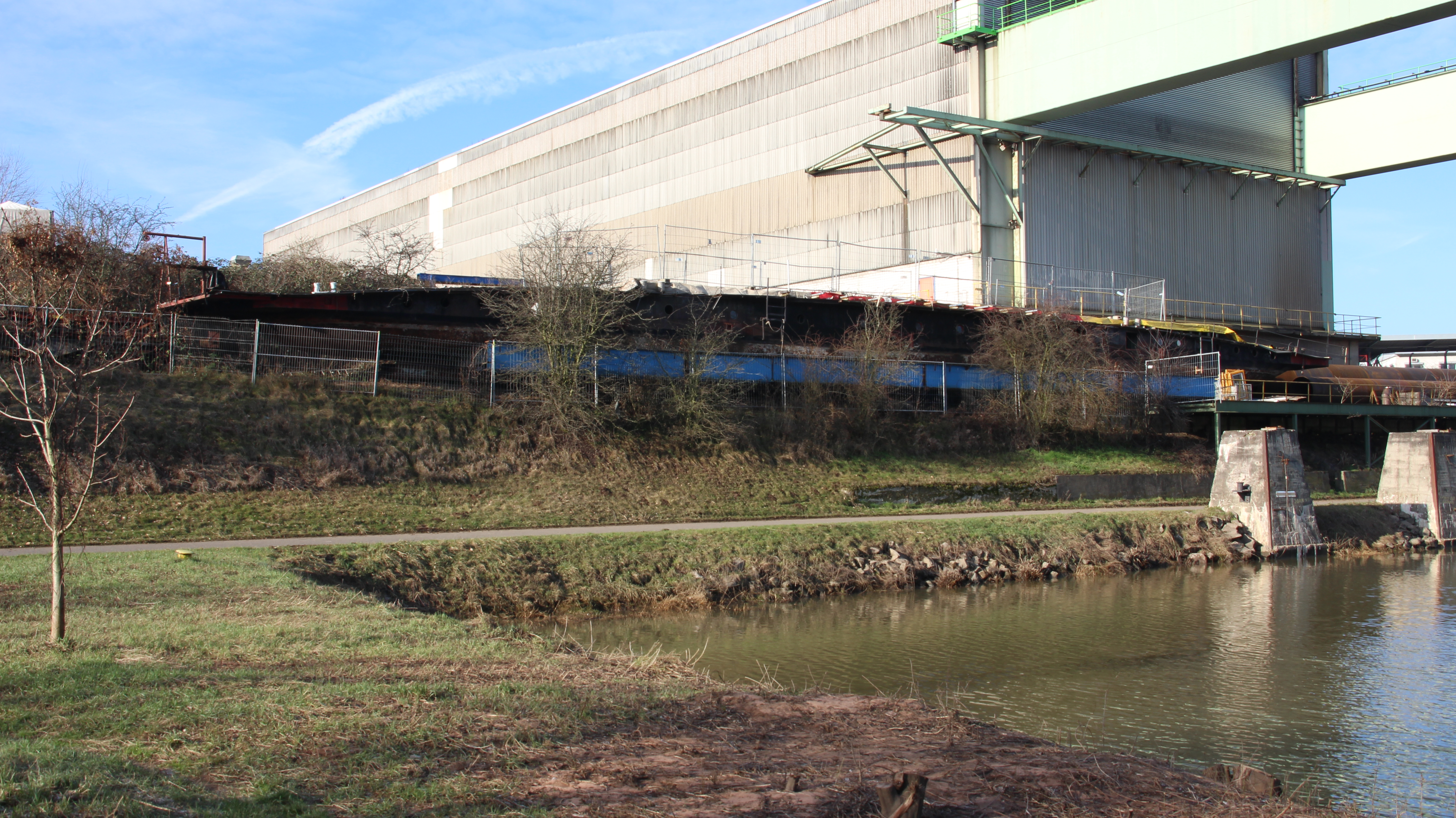
Hull of the last surviving Main chain ship in Aschaffenburg

== Germany's last chain ships ==
The final surviving example of a Main chain ship was on display in the former raft harbour of Aschaffenburg until March 2009. The Määkuh was used as a restaurant and jetty until the advent of the new millennium. The ship's superstructure had been modified to such an extent that it was no longer recognisable as a chain ship. Subsequently, she was moored in the Erlenbach am Main shipyard and has since been docked at the SMA harbour on the left bank of the Main at Main km 91 in Aschaffenburg, where she has remained since October 2009 (see illustration). The vessel has been dismantled and is no longer afloat. In the autumn of 2009, the associations "Technikdenkmal Määkuh" and "AbaKuZ e. V." initiated a campaign to prevent the vessel from being scrapped and to facilitate its subsequent reconstruction in its original form. In 2010, the ship was sold. The ship's hull, with a maximum clearance height of approximately 1.80 metres, was to be used as a café or exhibition space in the immediate vicinity of the castle in the future. However, the city council rejected the plans in 2015. In 2021, the future of the ship remained uncertain. The dimensions of the ship indicate that it belongs to the series K.B.K.S. No. I to V. As a result of its historical significance and exceptional rarity, it was included as a movable monument in Part A – Monuments – Book 71 of the list of monuments – City of Aschaffenburg.

The last remaining example of a chain ship that can be identified as such is the Gustav Zeuner, which was used on the Elbe and is now moored in Magdeburg as a museum ship.

== Literature ==
- Berninger, Otto. "Bericht der Reichsbahndirektion Nürnberg vom 7. August 1935 an die Hauptverwaltung der Deutschen Reichsbahn-Gesellschaft". Mainschiffahrtsnachrichten (in German). 11 – via Verein zur Förderung des Schifffahrts- und Schiffbaumuseums Wörh am Main.
- Schanz, Georg (1893). Studien über die bayerischen Wasserstraßen. Die Kettenschleppschiffahrt auf dem Main (in German). Vol. 1. Bamberg: Buchner.
- Zesewitz, Sigbert; Düntzsch, Helmut; Grötschel, Theodor (1987). Kettenschiffahrt (in German). Berlin: Technik. ISBN 978-3-341-00282-7
- Weiß, Eduard (1901). "Die Kettenschlepper der kgl. bayerischen Kettenschleppschiffahrt auf dem oberen Main". Zeitschrift des Vereines Deutscher Ingenieure (in German). 45 (17): 578–584.
- Betz, Helmut (1996). Die Mainschiffahrt: vom Kettenschleppzug zum Gelenkverband. Historisches vom Strom (in German). Vol. 12. Duisburg: Krüpfganz. ISBN 978-3-924999-13-1
