= Chain boat navigation on the Elbe and Saale rivers =

Type of ship transport in Germany

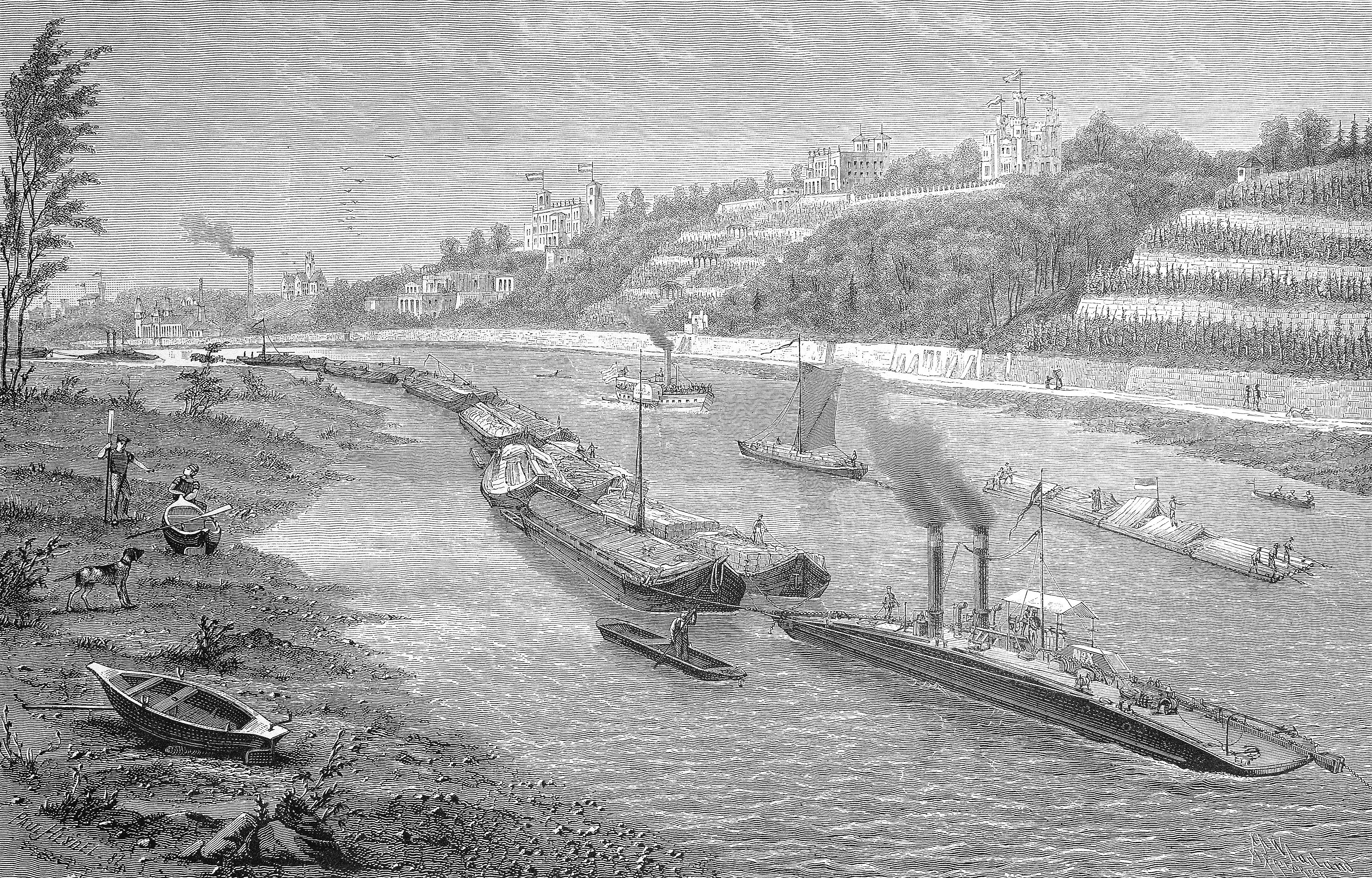
Chain steamer on the Elbe river near Dresden

Chain boat navigation on the Elbe and Saale rivers was a special type of ship transport that dominated motorised inland shipping on the Elbe and Saale river in the second half of the 19th century. A chain tug pulled several barges along a chain laid in the river. Until chain boat navigation revolutionised inland shipping in Germany from 1866 onwards, initially on the Elbe, towing was the predominant type of propulsion for upstream ships. After the chain was removed, up to 28 chain tugs sailed upstream of the Elbe over a total distance of 668 kilometres (Hamburg to Aussig in Bohemia). From 1890 onwards, the importance of chain shipping in the area of the lower Elbe continued to decline in favour of paddle steam tugs and was completely discontinued here by 1898. On the Upper Elbe, it was able to survive until 1926/27 and was then only used locally in Germany until 1943 in three short, particularly difficult sections of the Elbe. From 1943 to 1945, the last section of the route in Germany was the short section in Magdeburg, where chain boat navigation on the Elbe had begun. In Bohemia, it was still used until 1948. Chain boat navigation existed on the Saale from 1873 to 1921.

== Spread of chain boat navigation ==
=== Elbe river ===
Chain boat trips on the Elbe and Saale

On 16 June 1864, the Vereinigte Hamburg-Magdeburger Dampfschiffahrts-Compagnie – Martin Graff was the director of this company – received the concession for chain shipping on the Elbe. The first chain tug steamer, the "No. 1", built by the company's own shipyard in Buckau according to the French model, was used for testing on 15 August 1866 in the area of the Magdeburg bridges between Magdeburg-Neustadt and Buckau. On this approximately five-kilometre-long section, the Elbe has a particularly high current velocity due to the Domfelsen. The tests were successful and regular operations took place on this route.

Gradients and kilometres of route

Due to the high acquisition costs, the expansion of the chain by the Vereinigte Hamburg-Magdeburger Dampfschiffahrts-Compagnie was relatively slow. By 1868, the 51-kilometre-long chain had been laid between Magdeburg and Ferchland, in 1872 between Ferchland and Wittenberge (77 kilometres), and in 1874 between Wittenberge and Hamburg (165 kilometres).

The situation was different on the Upper Elbe. The company Kettenschleppschiffahrt der Oberelbe (KSO) under the direction of the engineer and general director Ewald Bellingrath in Dresden was responsible for this. He had recognised that a revolution in the Elbe shipping, which had become insignificant until then, could only take place with the use of modern technology. In the article The Chain boat navigation on the Elbe by A. Woldt it says about the first test run in Dresden:

At that time, in 1869, when the first test run on the route from Riesa to Dresden took place under his direction, the rule of the Bomätscher was still in full bloom, and they were so well aware of it that they did not fear the competition of the chain steamer in the least. On the contrary, they even pitied him, expecting at any moment that he would perish on one of the many dangerous rapids. But when the vessel with the train it had towed had elegantly and safely passed the notorious sharp corner of the Meissen carriage, the faces became noticeably longer, and after at the end even the horror of all horrors for the shipping of that time, the dangerous passage under the Augustus Bridge in Dresden, which narrowed the stream, had been covered without the slightest damage to the towing train, then the Bomätscher were overcome by a feeling of anger and enmity, and more than one stone, hurled from their midst, flew onto the vehicle.

Just a few months later, Bellingrath applied for the Saxon, Anhalt, and Prussian chain concession, which was granted to him in the same year (December 1870) for the Elbe line from Magdeburg to Schandau on the Bohemian border after tough efforts and overcoming all political and official difficulties. As early as 1 October 1871, i.e. only about ten months later, towing operations on this 330-kilometre-long route with nine chain steamers went into operation. Later, Bellingrath also ensured the further spread of chain shipping on other rivers in Germany and he is therefore often referred to as the "father of chain boat navigation".

In 1872, the "Prague Steam and Sailing Shipping Company" expanded the chain operation from the Bohemian border to Aussig and started with two chain tugs. In 1879, a third chain tug was added on this route, so that two to three tugs per day with an average of seven to eight barges sailed upstream from Schandau. In 1882, the company became the property of the "Austrian Northwest Steamship Company". In 1895, the chain is said to have even extended over a 777-kilometre route from Hamburg and via the Elbe and Vltava to Prague, although only on the section from Hamburg to Aussig did extensive and steady operation take place.

In 1881, Bellingrath's KSO bought the Elb-Dampfschiffahrts-Gesellschaft and the Hamburg-Magdeburger Dampfschiffahrts-Compagnie and merged with them to form the Kette – Deutsche Elbschiffahrts-Gesellschaft. It was headed by Bellingrath and was responsible for the entire German Elbe chain operation from Hamburg to the Bohemian border (630 kilometres).

=== Saale river ===
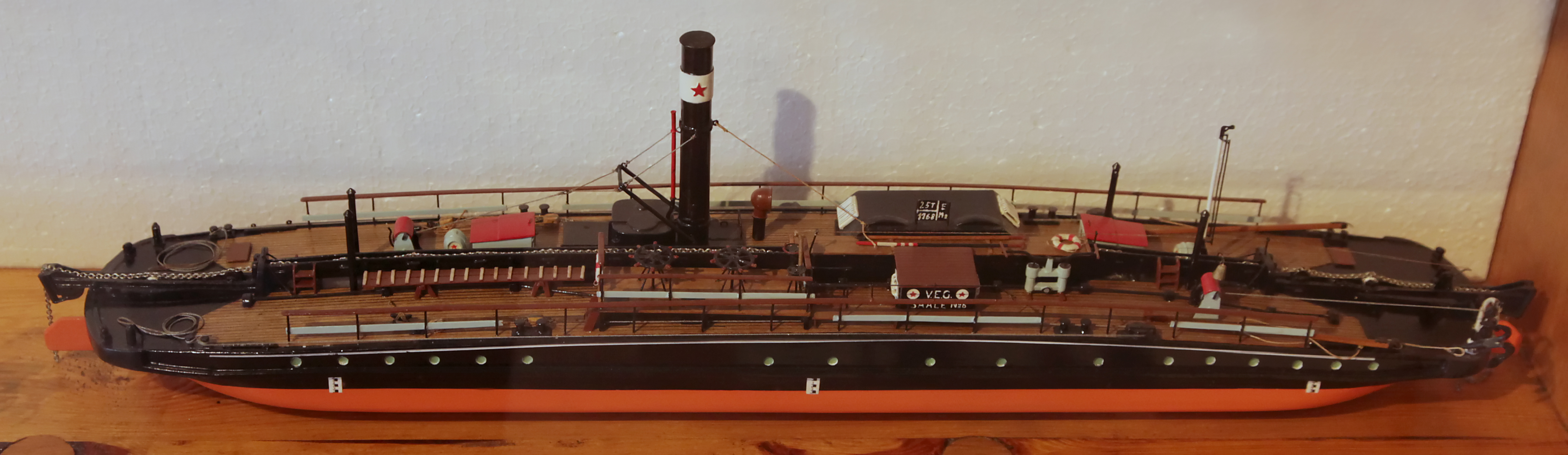
Chain tug steamer VEG Saale No. 6 (1903, model Theodor Grötschel)

In 1871, a "Steam and Tug Shipping Association on Saale and Unstrut" was founded in Artern. The plan was to equip short sections of the route with chains or ropes. However, this plan was never implemented by the company.

On the Saale, the 21 km long line from the mouth of the Saale in Barby to Calbe was put into operation in 1873, thus establishing a connection to the chain in the Elbe. Further expansion was postponed for the time being due to the difficult fairway and the seven locks upstream. The state of Anhalt, and especially the city of Halle, pushed for an extension of the chain. However, Prussia only considered an expansion to be sensible if the chain would reach Leipzig after the construction of the Elster-Saale Canal. After long negotiations, it was decided in 1881 to extend the chain to 105 km on a trial basis and thus to Halle; this was implemented in 1884.

Chain boat navigation on the Saale suffered a sharp decline with the outbreak of the First World War and was completely discontinued in 1921. The chain was taken out of the Saale in 1922.

== Effect of chain ships on the Elbe navigation ==
In the middle of the 19th century, the railways developed into a nationwide network and increasingly competed with tow shipping. Until then, the Elbe shipping industry had accepted the burden of the Elbe custom and the natural obstacles of the waterway, because it still had an advantage over the country roads. The Elbe toll was more than half of the total costs on the route from Hamburg to Saxony, and even 70% to Bohemia. Fluctuating water levels, and changes in the course of the river, as well as wind and weather, also resulted in transport delays and not infrequently losses of ships and cargo. The railway transported goods faster, more reliably and, because of the exemption from customs duties, also cheaper than the ship. Advancing industrialisation brought growth to both modes of transport, but the growth on the railway side was much greater. In addition, especially the goods subject to full customs duties left the Elbe and switched to the railway. These goods were also the higher-quality goods, the transport of which had brought in the highest revenues. Shipping traffic was increasingly limited to bulk goods such as pig iron, coal, guano, and saltpeter. It was not until 1863 that the Elbe toll could be significantly reduced and in 1870 it was completely abolished.

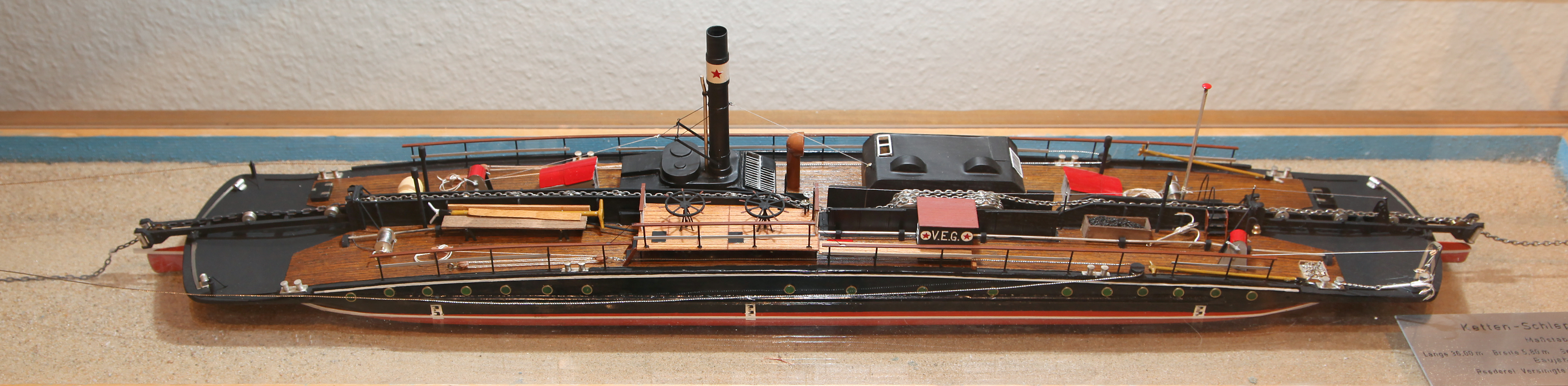
Chain tow steamer (around 1885, model)

Chain tugging revolutionised the Elbe chain shipping, which had been characterised by towing for centuries. Sailing operations were discontinued or only used as a makeshift. The heavy rigging became superfluous and could be replaced by additional cargo. The crew on the barges was reduced by more than half. The skipper became independent of many unfavourable weather conditions. The number of possible voyages of a ship increased almost threefold. Instead of two trips, six to eight trips were made annually, covering 8000 km annually. Accordingly, delivery times were shortened and more reliably adhered to, and costs fell, so that some goods that had been transferred to the railways switched back to the cheaper waterway.

Similar changes could very well have been made by paddle tug steamers, but the concessions of chain shipping guaranteed the skippers transport at fixed prices at all times and thus sufficient safety, to stop sailing operations and switch to towing operations. The size of the barges, which at that time was usually around 100 tonnes, could be increased. About ten years after the introduction of tug boating, barges with a typical carrying capacity of about 500 tons were built.

The volume of freight remained virtually constant for a very long period between 1830 and 1874. For example, the ships transported about 7 to 8 million quintals (350,000–400,000 tons) annually from Hamburg upstream. The shipping traffic downstream to Hamburg was somewhat lower at about 6 million quintals (300,000 tons). After the completion of chain shipping, the volume of freight increased steadily and after ten years reached about four times, namely 28 million hundredweights (1.4 million tons) upstream and 24 million hundredweights (1.2 million tons) downstream.

== Licence conditions and competition ==
In order to be able to operate chain shipping, the company responsible for the chain towing operation needed a licence from the responsible state, in which, among other things, the rights and obligations towards the skippers were regulated. Paragraphs 10 to 13 of the licence conditions for the Kettenschleppschifffahrt der Oberelbe (KSO) regulated the tariff. Accordingly, every tariff adjustment required the approval and authorisation of the Ministry of Finance. Tariffs were also fixed for at least one year and could not be changed during this time. The transport fees were to be calculated in proportion to the towing distance, regardless of the goods transported. In addition, the chain shipping companies were critically monitored by the Ministry of Finance. Every five years, the annual net income was reviewed to ensure that it did not exceed 10 per cent of the capital demonstrably invested in the company. If the profit was too high, the tariffs were reduced by the Ministry of Finance.

As a result of these regulations, the freedom of the chain shipping companies was very limited and they were unable to react flexibly to changes in the market. In contrast to chain shipping, the other types of towage were free to set tariffs according to supply and demand, adjust costs to the volume of freight transported or negotiate special conditions with individual customers.

However, paragraphs 6 and 9 of the licence document were even more drastic. The operator was obliged to transport every loaded or unloaded vehicle in the order in which it was registered, regardless of the route over which the vehicle was to be towed. Although the Kettenschifffahrtsgesellschaft was permitted to transport goods or vehicles on its own account, third-party vehicles had priority in transport under all circumstances, even if they had been registered later. This led to the virtual elimination of its own cargo shipping business.

Chain boat navigation was in direct competition with wheeled tugboats and the railway. However, the two German chain tugboat companies in Magdeburg and Dresden also competed with each other. In the early 1870s, the Vereinigte Hamburg-Magdeburger Dampfschiffahrts-Compagnie sold all of its former paddle tugboats to introduce chain tugboat transport between Magdeburg and Hamburg. However, this made it impossible for her to tow above Magdeburg. The entire towed clientele, who wanted to travel not only as far as Magdeburg but further up the Elbe, could only be served as far as Magdeburg. Here the skippers were left to their fate, often having to wait several days for onward transport. The Dresden-based KSO acted proactively and opened its own freight forwarding office in Hamburg with the aim of retaining the towing customers in Hamburg. The company used its own paddle steamer to tow the Hamburg-Magdeburg route and contracted two others. This guaranteed the skippers seamless transport from Hamburg to the Bohemian border.

After the pressure of competition from the paddle tugboats had increased, the KSO succeeded in having the licence relaxed in 1879. The government authorised the innovation that the company was no longer obliged to tow vehicles whose owners were themselves engaged in commercial wheel towing. It was also authorised to adjust the tariff rates itself as required. The enormous competition had an unfavourable effect on the results of the two chain companies and in 1880 the two companies came closer together and concluded joint contracts. In 1881, the KSO bought the Elb-Dampfschiffahrts-Gesellschaft and the Hamburg-Magdeburger Dampfschiffahrts-Compagnie and merged with them on 1 January 1882 to form the Kette - Deutsche Elbschiffahrts-Gesellschaft.

== Technical equipment ==
=== Chain ===
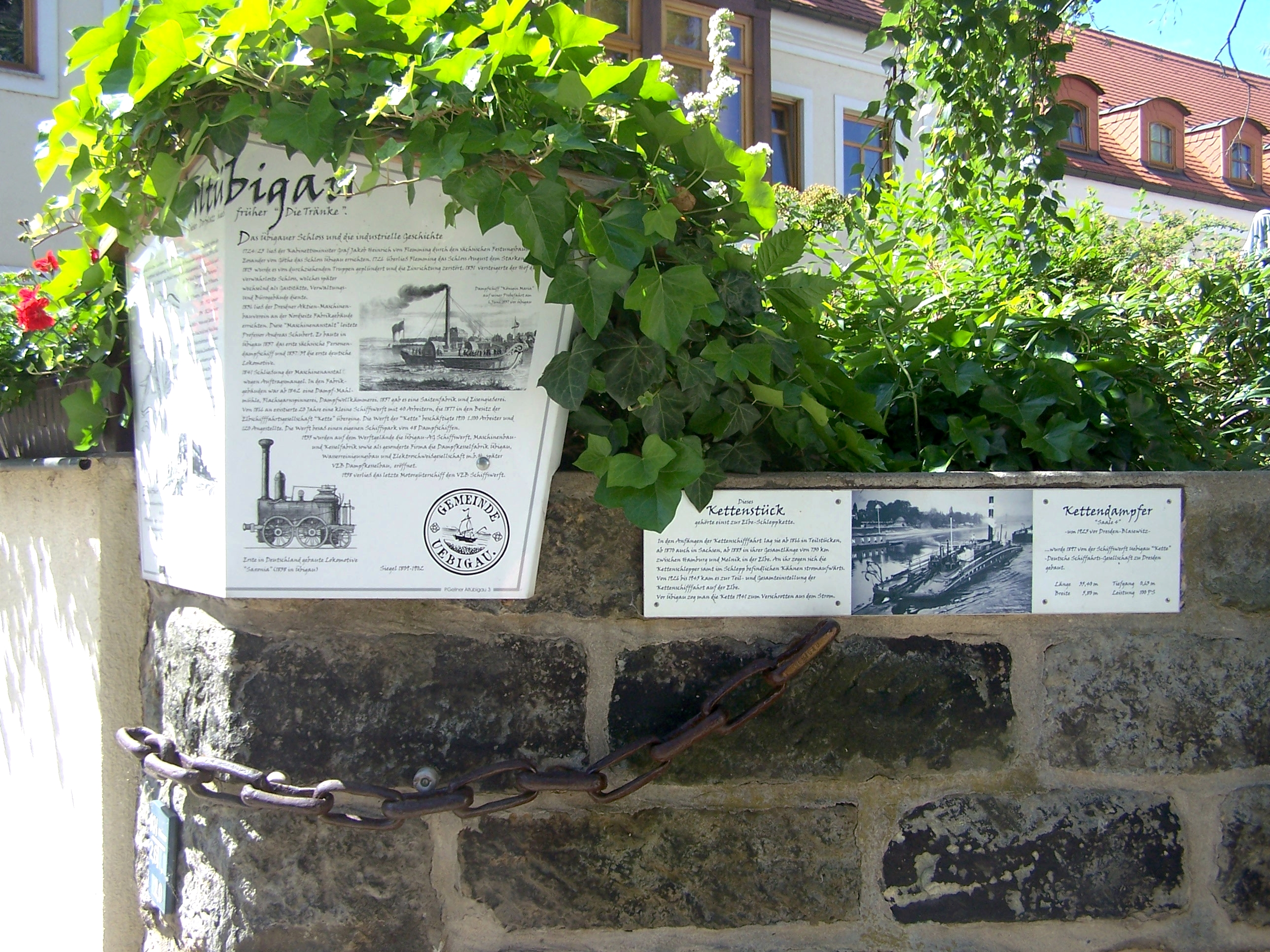
Information boards in Altübigau on chain boat navigation on the Elbe, including an original chain section

The chain for chain tugs on the Elbe was mainly imported from England by all three chain shipping companies. The Magdeburg company had also sourced part of the chain from Hamburg to Wittenberge from France. The reason for the import was the necessary high quality of the fire welding of the pre-bent chain links. At the beginning of chain boat navigation in Germany, this could not be guaranteed by domestic production. In 1880, the Oberelbe chain company attempted to manufacture the chain independently in its shipyard, the Übigau shipyard. It produced 3500 metres of chain. However, it was not possible to achieve consistently high quality in mass production.

The chain in the Elbe was a ship's chain without a bar, whose chain links were 4.5 times as long as the thickness of the round iron. At the beginning of chain boat navigation on the Elbe, a 22 millimetre thick chain was usually used. However, a 25 millimetre thick chain was also used on some sections of the route. The chain material used was a round bar with a low carbon content.

On the approximately 330-kilometre stretch from Magdeburg to the Bohemian border, the chain had stretched by 7500 metres in just three years due to stretching and wear. Many chain sections had to be replaced prematurely, so that after ten years only around 12 kilometres of the original chain were still in use. The heavily worn chain often broke and had to be repaired on the chain ship. The chain sections were replaced by chains with thicknesses of 25 and 27 millimetres.

"Chain lock" (red) to open the chain

To make it easier to replace sections of chain, there were shackles (called "chain locks") every 400 to 500 metres to make it easier to open the chain. These 'chain locks' were also intended to be opened when two chainships met on a chain. Corrosion and stretching of the chain, which also occurred during normal use, meant that the chain locks could no longer be opened, so the chain was simply separated at a normal chain link. To do this, a link was placed upright on the boom with a pair of pliers and compressed so much by hitting it with a sledgehammer that it tore open and could be widened with a crowbar until the next chain link was pulled through. After the manoeuvre was completed, the chain was closed again with a chain lock. If two chain tugs met, a complicated evasive manoeuvre was necessary in which the chain was transferred to the other tug via an auxiliary chain, the so-called exchange chain, which each chain tug carried. This manoeuvre meant a delay of at least 20 minutes for the towing convoy travelling upstream, while the ship travelling downstream lost around 45 minutes as a result of the manoeuvre.

Later, when the frequency of the chain tugs' encounters increased, the chain tugs (Nos. 5-10, XXI and XIII) were fitted with twin propellers, which enabled them to travel down to the valley with almost no loss of time. It was only here that they had to settle down again.

=== Chain tug ===
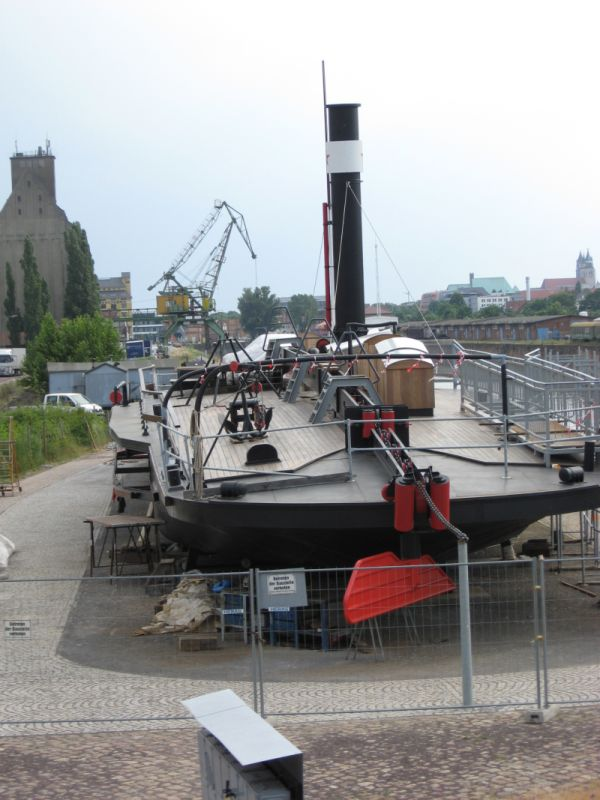
The Gustav Zeuner during the restoration in 2010

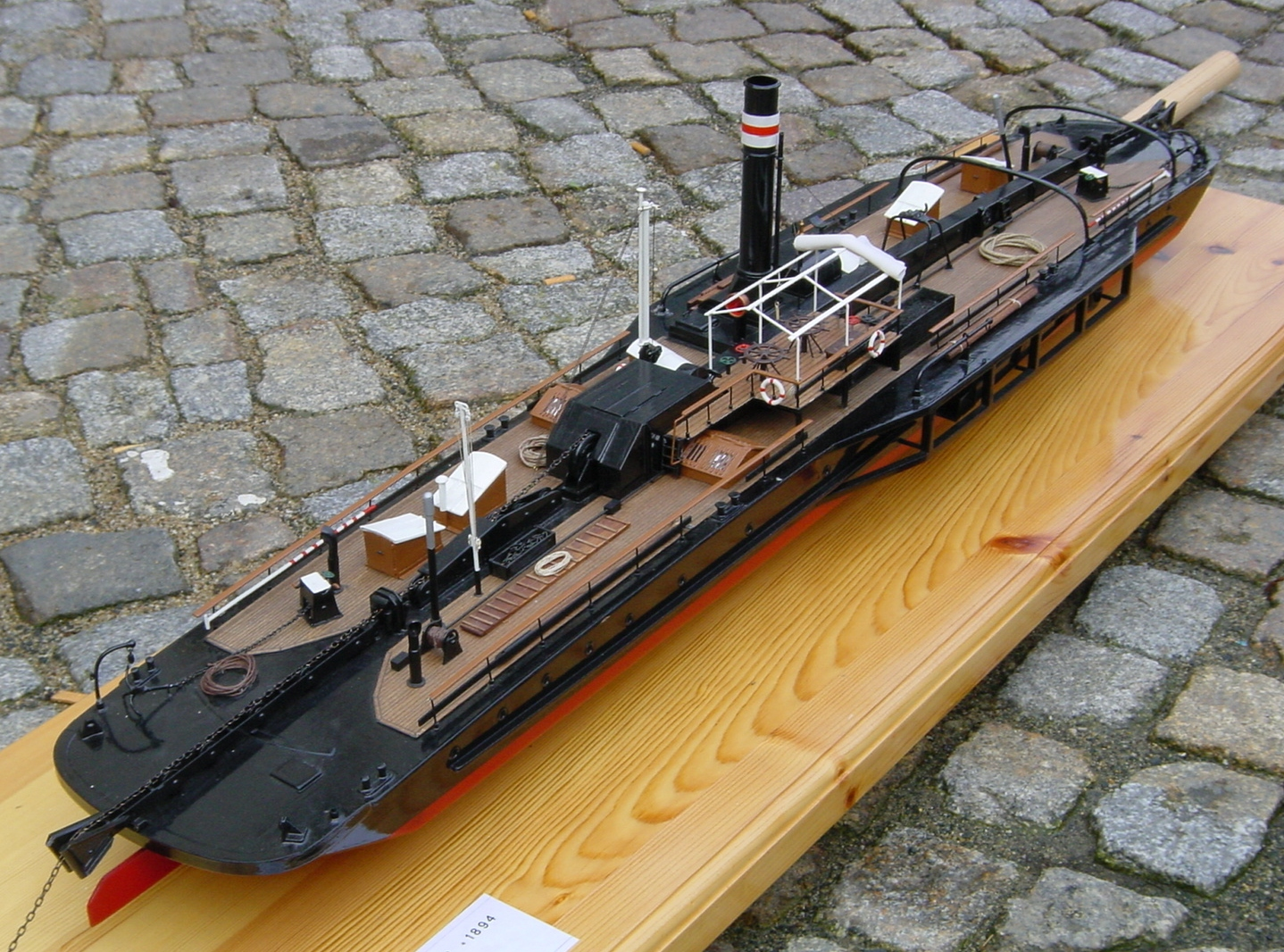
Model of the Gustav Zeuner chain tractor

The Elbe's chain tugs, built at the shipyards in Magdeburg, Dresden, Roßlau and Prague, were adapted to the conditions of the unregulated Elbe and were able to convert their relatively low engine power into towing capacity with good efficiency.

The chain steamer No. 1 used in Magdeburg in 1866 was built by the machine factory and shipyard of the Vereinigte Magdeburger Schiffahrts-Compagnie in Magdeburg-Buckau. With the exception of the deck, it was constructed entirely of iron, was 51.3 metres long, 6.7 metres wide and had a draught of 48 cm. It had rudders at both ends, which could be moved together from the centre of the ship. With the help of this control system and two movable arms attached to each end of the ship, which held the chain between rollers and could be rotated horizontally by almost 90°, it was possible to steer the ship in a direction other than that of the pulling chain without disturbing the winding of the chain. This was of great importance for the use of the Kettenschiff on curved river sections. On the deck of the ship were two drums 1.1 metres in diameter and 2.6 metres apart, each with four grooves. The chain, which was lifted out of the water by the ship at its bow, ran in an upward-sloping channel with guide rollers to the drum winch. There it looped around each drum 3½ times, passing from the first groove of the first drum to the first groove of the second drum, then to the second groove of the first drum, and so on. Finally, it was channelled to the stern of the ship in a sloping channel and sank back into the water.

The chain ships that followed were similar in principle, although they differed slightly in their dimensions or the design of the steam engine. The typical length of the ships was 38 to 50 metres, their width around 7 to 7.5 metres. From 1872, most of the chain ships were fitted with an additional twin-screw drive, which enabled them to travel "free" - i.e. without a chain. This was much easier on the chain.

Another change was made after Bellingrath realised that the chain breakages were largely caused by wear and tear on the drum winch mechanism. In 1892, he designed the chain gripping wheel named after him. The first newly-built chain ship equipped with it was the Gustav Zeuner in 1894. It was also equipped with a new type of drive in the form of two water turbines designed by Gustav Anton Zeuner (the forerunner of today's water jet propulsion), with which the ship could be steered and travelled down to the valley without a chain. With a length of over 55 metres and a width of over ten metres, the ship was larger than the previous chain ships and its dimensions were already approaching those of the smaller paddle tugs.

For the Saale, on the other hand, with its many tight bends and narrow locks, small chain ships less than 40 metres long and less than 6 metres wide were needed. Only one of the older chain ships on the Elbe met these requirements and was used on the lower Saale from 1873. After the chain was extended to Halle, chain ships built for other rivers were purchased and new ones were built.

== Tariff ==
The tariffs for barges were set within the concession. The costs resulted from a basic fee for the towed vehicle and an additional fee for the load. The tariff also depended on the section of river travelled. While higher tariffs of 130% of the standard tariff were charged on the sections of Bohemia with a higher volume of freight, reduced tariffs of only 50% of the standard tariff applied on the Hamburg - Magdeburg route.

Overall, the skipper generally found that he made only a small profit on the ascent (even made a loss on an empty run), while he derived the profit mainly from the downstream transports.

== The end of chain boat navigation on the Elbe ==
=== Number of tugs on the Elbe ===
Year	Chain tug	Wheel tractor
1882	31	28
1903	35	58
1922	23	63
1927	17	77

Chain boat navigation on the Elbe suffered greatly from the various trade customs. At the trading place, a skipper could not demand the immediate unloading of his cargo, but on the contrary had to grant 12 to 14 days of unloading time, depending on the quantity transported. This resulted in the fact that of the approximately 300-day season, only about 75 days were used for actual chain boat navigation on the Elbe, while 225 days were used for loading, unloading and lying under cargo. An improvement in delivery times through higher towing speeds was only possible to a limited extent as long as the merchants used the cargo ships as cheap magazines.

Chain boat navigation was superior to other types of ship operation wherever there were difficulties for shipping, such as rapids, steep bends in the valley path and shallows. At the time of chain shipping, the maximum permissible navigation depth at average water level on the stretch from Aussig to the Austrian border was just 54 centimetres, and between the Austrian border and Magdeburg it was 60 to 65 centimetres. Below Magdeburg to the mouth of the Havel, the shipping depth increased to 90 centimetres, further down the Elbe a draught of 90 to 100 centimetres could be reached at average water level. With the increase in traffic, the river was increasingly regulated: The gradients were levelled out more and more, the curves of the river and the shallows were reduced, thereby also reducing the advantages of chain boat navigation. On the other hand, the paddle tug steamers made progress and their coal consumption decreased. At the same time, the progressive regulation of the current made it possible to build larger and more powerful paddle tow steamers.

Another problem for competitiveness was the high depreciation of the chain companies. The chain itself tied up a lot of capital and had to be replaced after about ten years.

In the 1890s, more powerful side-wheel tug steamers increasingly became competition for the chain tugs. Initially, this mainly affected the sections downstream of the Elbe below Torgau with a lower gradient of less than 0.25 ‰ and high water depth. The Kette – Deutsche Elbschiffahrts-Gesellschaft itself also converted its fleet more and more to the more promising paddle tug steamers and decided in 1884 to stop renewing the chain between Hamburg and Wittenberge. From 1891 onwards, chain steamers were used less and less below Magdeburg, until in 1898 the Prussian ministers approved the cessation of chain shipping on the approximately 270-kilometre-long route between Hamburg and Niegripp (north of Magdeburg) and the chain was lifted in this section.

On the steeper routes in Saxony and Bohemia, the chain steamers were able to hold their own against the paddle tow steamers for a little longer due to the shallower water depth and the higher current speed. But here, too, profitability increasingly shifted in the direction of wheeled tractors. In addition, there was the economic crisis of 1901/1902, which led to the fact that in December 1903 the formerly competing towing companies of wheeled tugs and chain tugs – Kette with the Dampfschleppschiffahrts-Gesellschaft Vereinigte Elbe- und Saale-Schiffer – and thus formed the Vereinigte Elbschiffahrts-Gesellschaft on 1 January 1904. Chain tug shipping lost more and more importance, in the years 1926 and 1927 it was discontinued in further large sections and the chains were lifted.

In Germany, chain was still in operation on three difficult sections of the Elbe until 1943, after which only two chain steamers were still in service in Germany on a stretch of about eleven kilometres near Magdeburg until they were destroyed in a heavy air raid on the city on January 16, 1945. Chain shipping was discontinued in Bohemia in 1948.

The disused chain steamers were either scrapped or converted into workshop ships, steam winches, barges or jetties. The Gustav Zeuner is the last remaining chain ship on the Elbe. She was restored over several years as part of a job creation measure in Magdeburg and opened as a museum ship after completion of the work.

== Museums with exhibitions on chain boat navigation on the Elbe ==
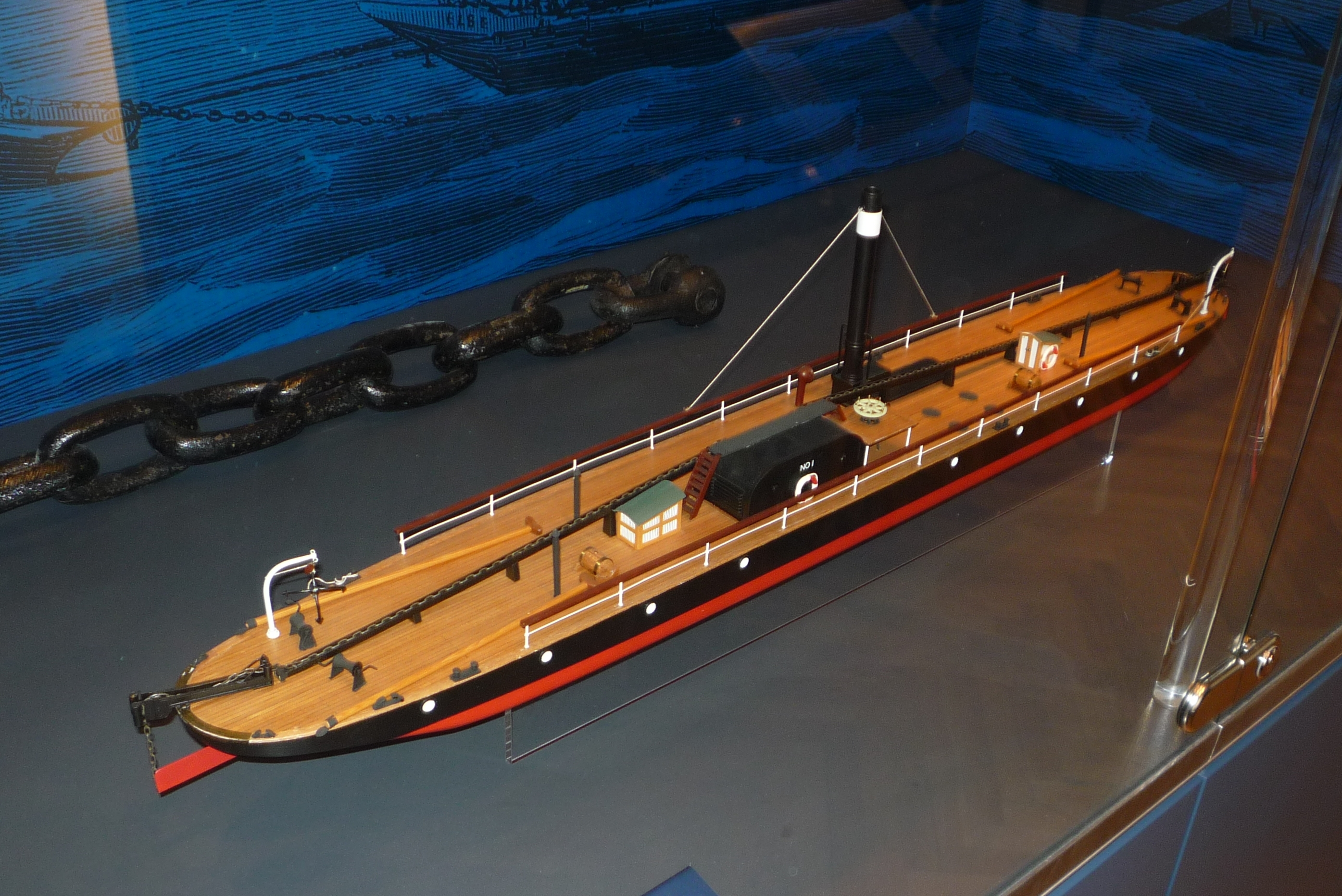
Model of the chain steamer No 1 in the Dresden Transport Museum

In the Elbe Shipping Museum in Lauenburg, part of the exhibition is dedicated to chain boat navigation on the Elbe. From August 2003 to 31 January 2004, a large special exhibition was held here in honour of the founder of chain shipping under the title Ewald Bellingrath – a life for the Elbe shipping. This special exhibition was subsequently shown in several other museums.

After three years of restoration, the chain steamer Gustav Zeuner was completed on 11 November 2010 and officially released as a museum ship. The ship is moored ashore in the former commercial port basin in Magdeburg. Over 150 workers were involved in the project run by the city of Magdeburg and the ARGE job centre.

== Bibliography ==
- Fölsche, Julius (1867). "Anfänge der Kettenschifffahrt auf der Elbe und der Seine" [Beginning of Chain Boat Navigation on the Elbe and the Seine]. Deutsche Bauzeitung (in German). 1. Berlin: Carl Beelitz: 306–307, 314–316 – via Wikisource.
- "Beschreibung des ersten deutschen Kettenschiffes zwischen Neustadt und Buckau" [Description of the First German Chain Ship Between Neustadt and Buckau]. Deutsche Bauzeitung (in German). 2. Berlin: Carl Beelitz: 100. 1868.
- "Dekret, die Ausübung der Kettenschifffahrt auf der Oberelbe betreffend; vom 20. Oktober 1869" [Decree Concerning the Practice of Chain Boat Navigation on the Upper Elbe; Dated October 20, 1869]. Gesetz- und Verordnungsblatt für das Königreich Sachsen vom Jahre 1869 (in German) (83). Dresden: Meinhold: 299–304. 1869 – via SLUB Dresden.
- Woldt, A. (1882). "Die Kettenschifffahrt auf der Elbe" [Chain Boat Navigation on the Elbe]. Die Gartenlaube (in German) (15): 251–254 – via Wikisource.
- "Meyers Konversations-Lexikon". Tauerei [Towing] (in German). Vol. 15. 1888.
- Zesewitz, Sigbert; Düntzsch, Helmut; Grötschel, Theodor (1987). Kettenschiffahrt [Chain Shipping] (in German). Berlin: VEB Verlag Technik. ISBN 3-341-00282-0.
- Jüngel, Karl (1993). Die Elbe – Geschichte um einen Fluß [The Elbe – History of a River] (in German). Anita Tykve Verlag. ISBN 978-3-925434-61-7.
- Rook, Hans-Joachim (1993). Rook, Hans-Joachim (ed.). Segler und Dampfer auf Havel und Spree [Sailors and Steamers on the Havel and Spree] (in German). Brandenburgisches Verlagshaus. ISBN 3-89488-032-5.
- Verein zur Förderung des Lauenburger Elbeschifffahrtsmuseums e. V., ed. (2003). Ewald Bellingrath – Ein Leben für die Schifffahrt [Ewald Bellingrath – A Life for Shipping]. Schriften des Vereins zur Förderung des Lauenburger Elbschiffahrtsmuseums e. V. (in German). Vol. 4. Lauenburg.
- Zesewitz, Sigbert (2017). Die Kettenschifffahrt auf Elbe und Saale [Chain Boat Navigation on the Elbe and Saale] (in German). Erfurt: Sutton Verlag. ISBN 978-3-95400-764-6.
