= Gustav Zeuner (ship) =

Historic chain tugboat preserved as a museum ship in Magdeburg, Germany

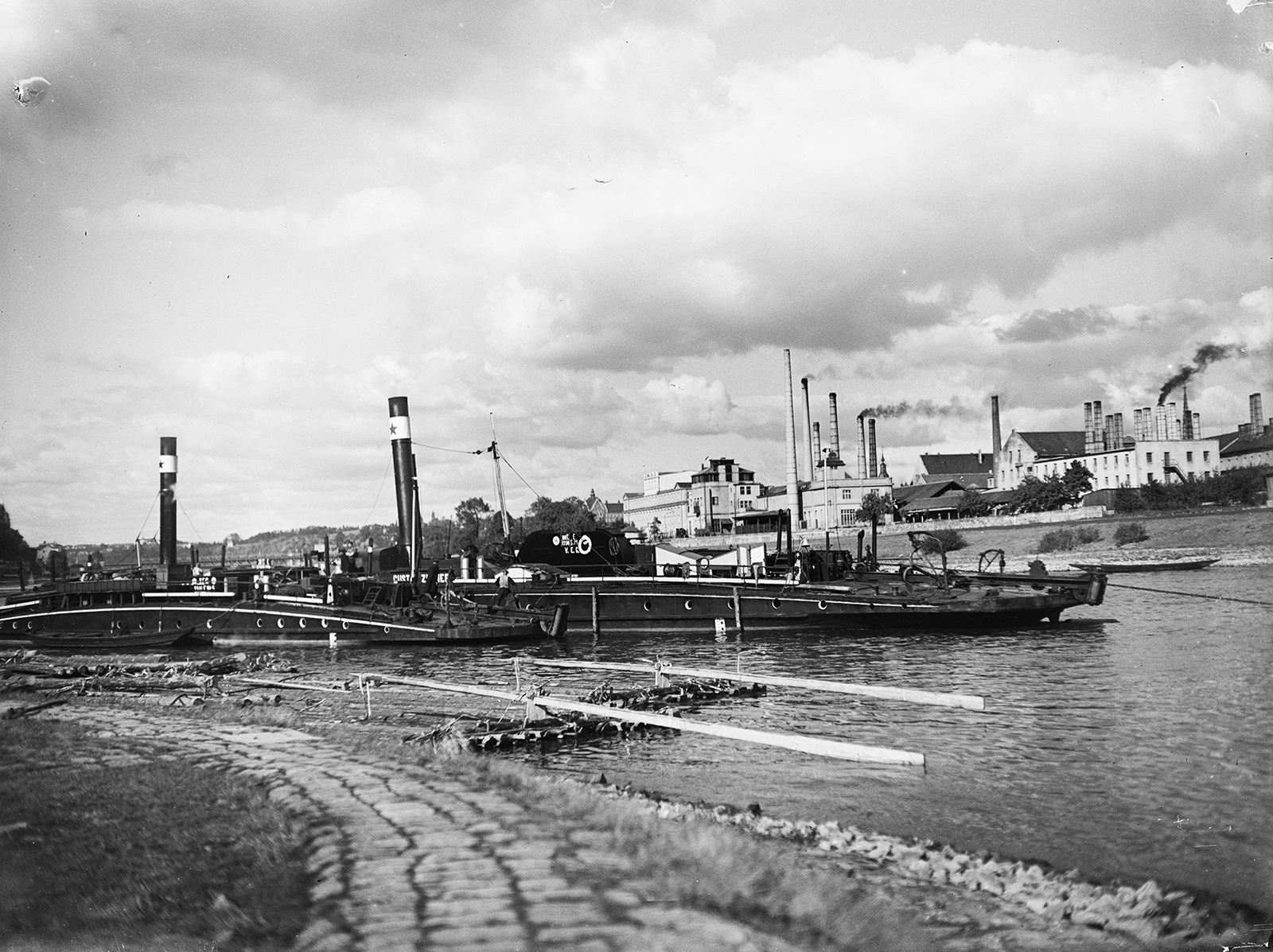
Gustav Zeuner (right) during chain change in Meißen, 1928

The ship Gustav Zeuner was built in 1894 at the Übigau Shipyard near Dresden as the first chain tug steamer of the second generation. It is the only almost completely preserved relic of chain boat navigation on the Elbe. The ship operated on the Elbe from 1895 to 1931 and is now a museum ship in the Magdeburg Trade Harbour. It is named after the German engineer Gustav Zeuner.

== History ==
With advancing industrialisation, bulk cargo traffic on the Elbe increased rapidly. The previously used paddle steamer tugs with low-pressure steam engines were too weak. To improve the towing transport system, new, more powerful tug steamers were sought. At that time, the required performance could only be provided by chain tugs.

The first concrete steps towards introducing chain navigation in Germany were taken on the Rhine and Elbe from 1862/1863. Chain navigation on the Elbe and Saale began with the first regular towing service using a chain tug in Magdeburg on the section between Magdeburg-Neustadt and Buckau. The extension of the chain to Hamburg was completed by 1874. In 1871, the chain was also laid on the upper Elbe as far as Kreinitz. By 1873, the KSO (Kettenschleppschifffahrt Oberelbe) owned 13 chain tugs. On the Saale, 105 km of chain were laid from the mouth to Halle (Saale) by 1903.

== The ship ==
The riveted iron chain tug was built from 1894 to 1895 at Übigau and commissioned there in 1895. This second-generation ship was equipped with a groundbreaking technical innovation: the “Bellingrath chain grip wheel” with a diameter of 2,320 mm. It also featured, far ahead of its time, two water turbines connected to the main engine via detachable couplings to improve manoeuvrability while travelling on the chain and to enable problem-free independent travel without the chain. These water turbines, an invention of Gustav Zeuner (the ship’s namesake), can be regarded as precursors to the modern waterjet drive. Important equipment included the towing gear with two tow ropes and two steam winches, a sturdy towing hook, anchors at bow and stern, manual anchor winches, bow and stern rudders, and pivoting outriggers for guiding the chain at bow and stern. These enabled the chain to be kept in the centre of the river even in tight bends. The anchors were conventional drag anchors with four flukes, typical for inland navigation at the time. After 1918, the grip wheel was replaced by chain drums.

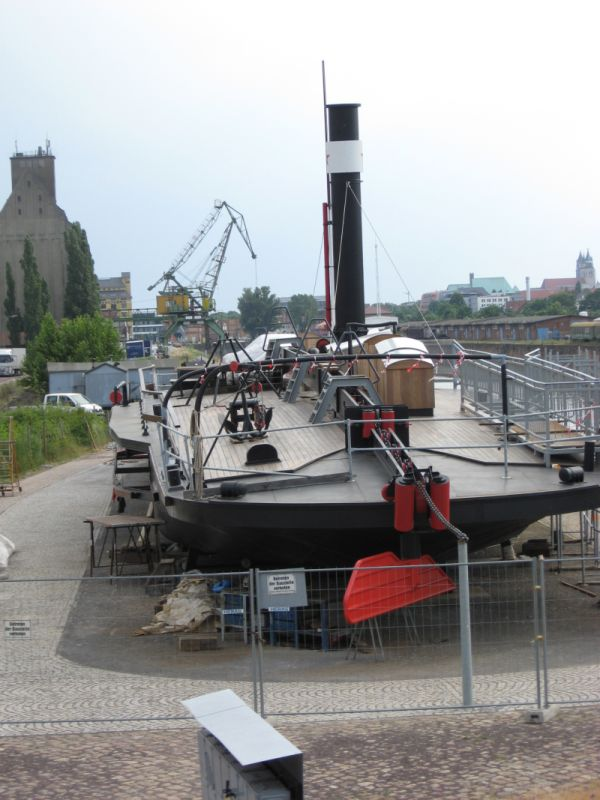
During restoration

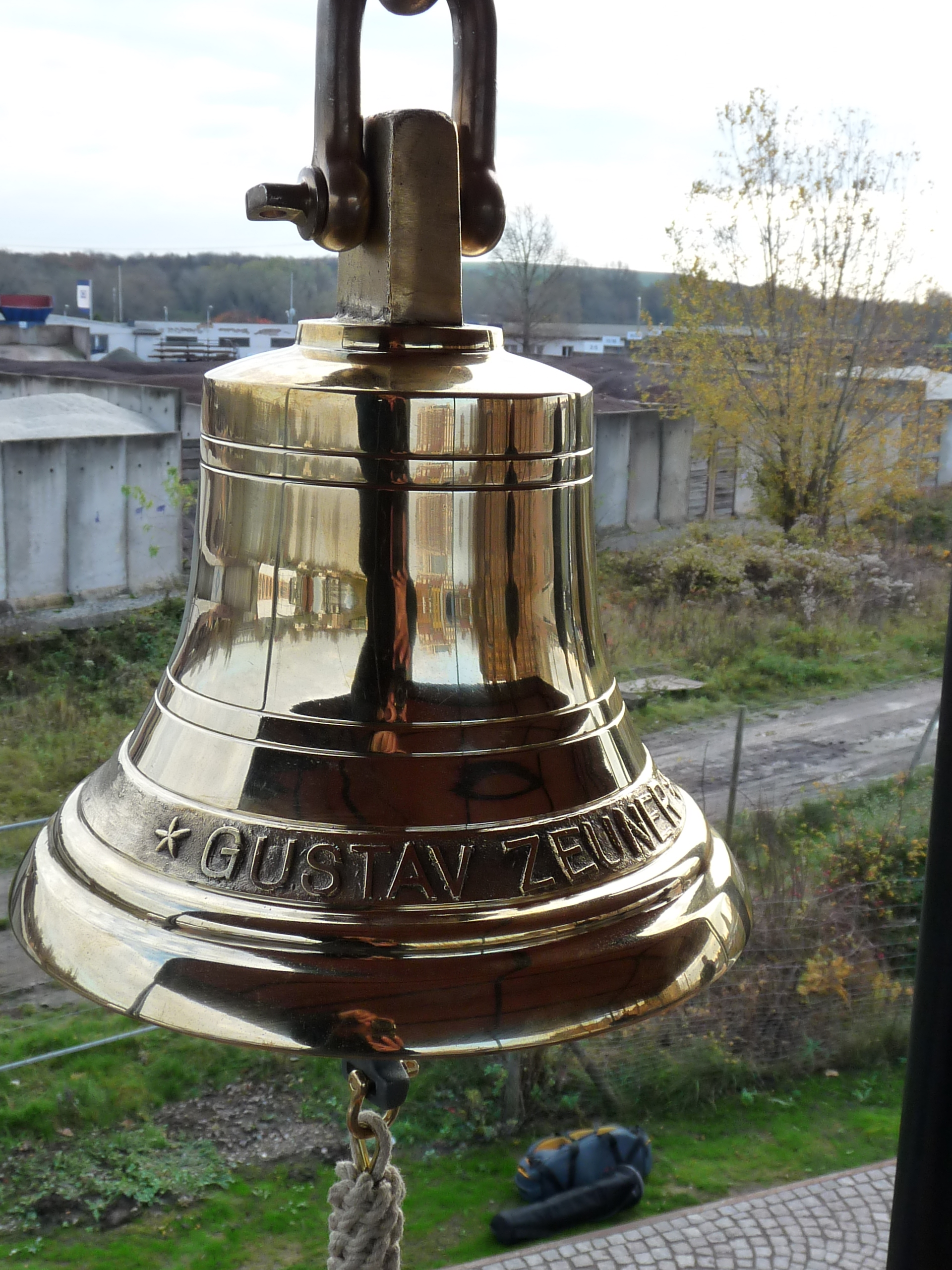
The ship’s bell

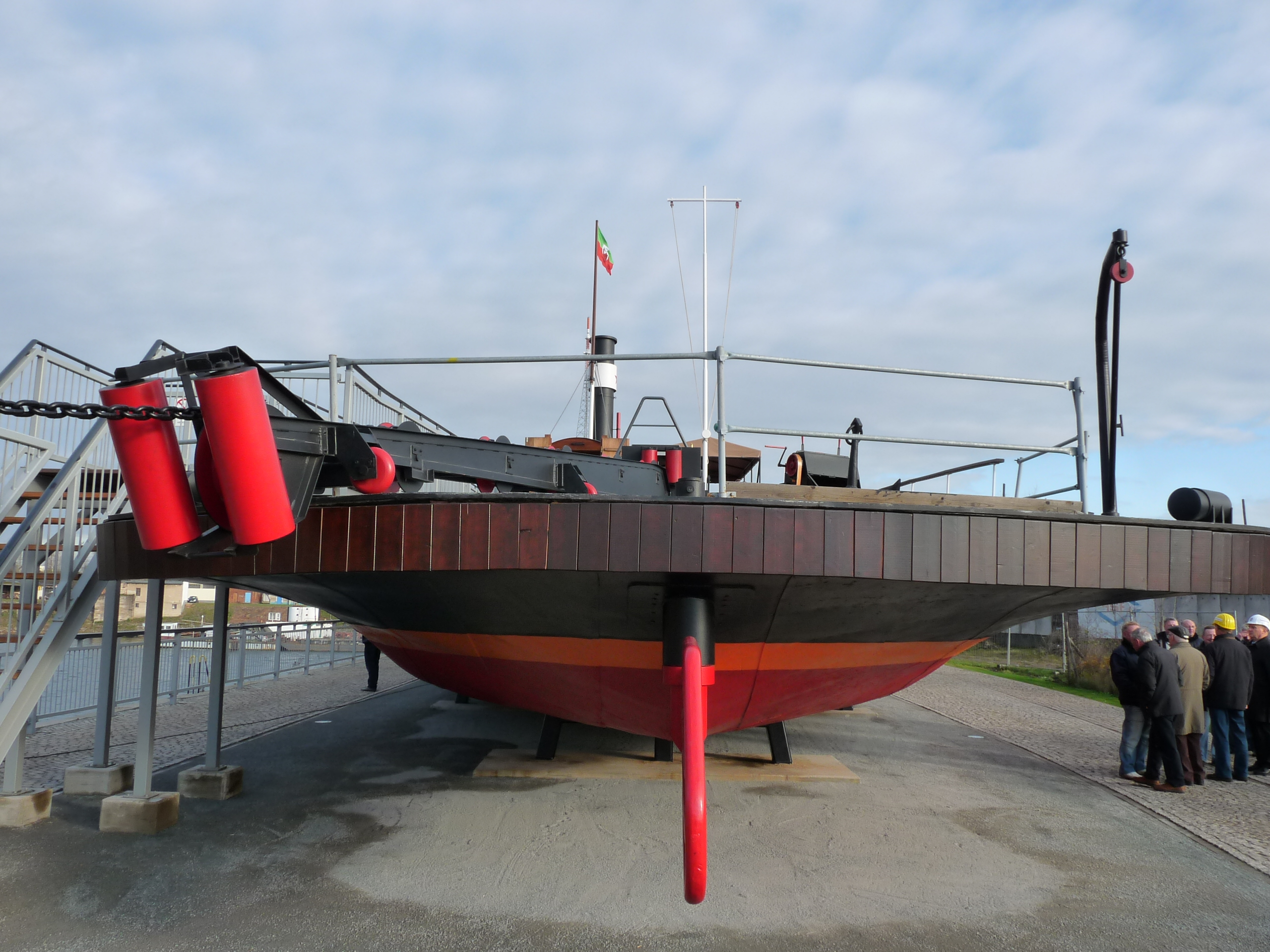
Bow view

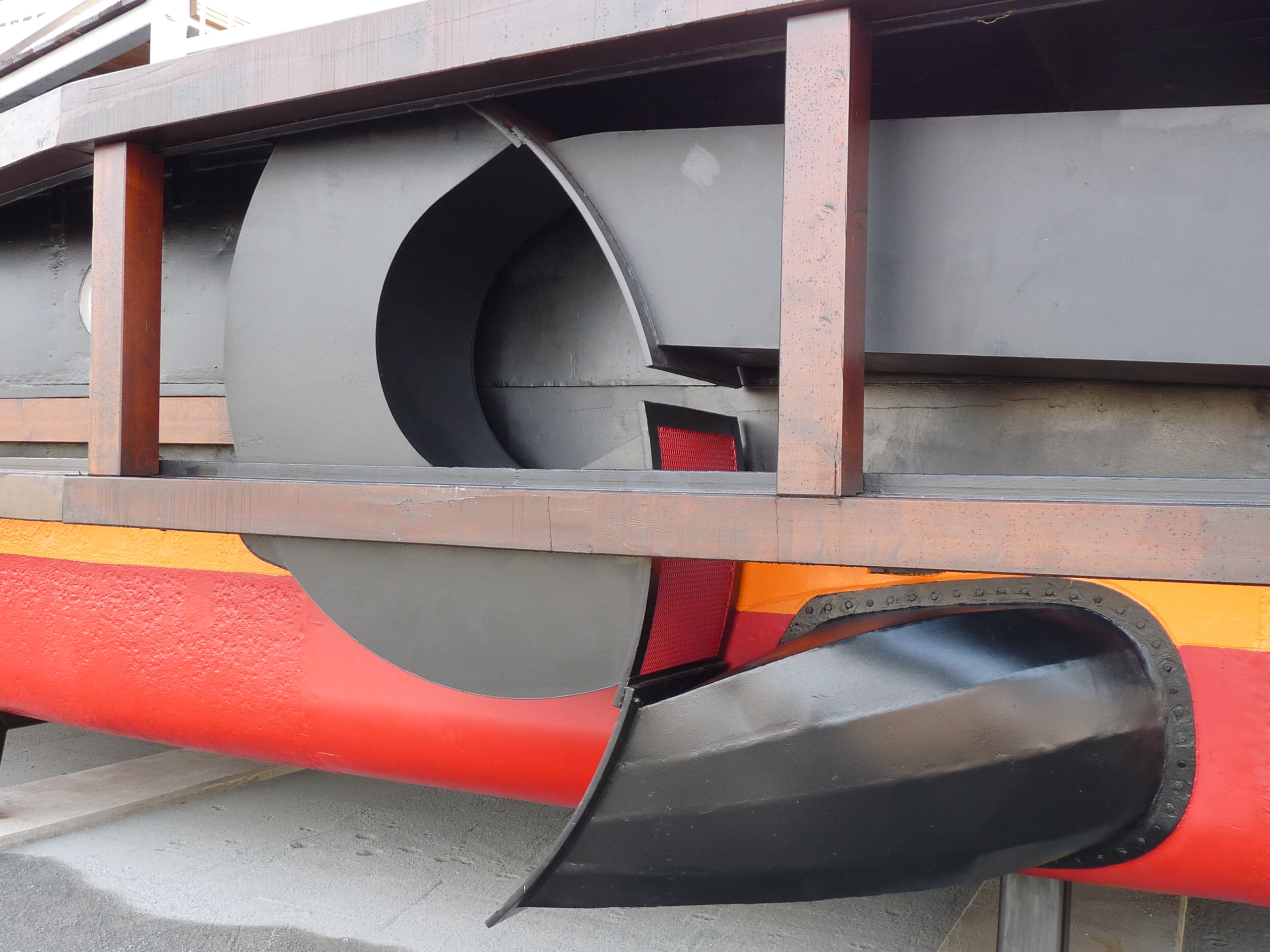
Outlet opening of the waterjet turbine on the side

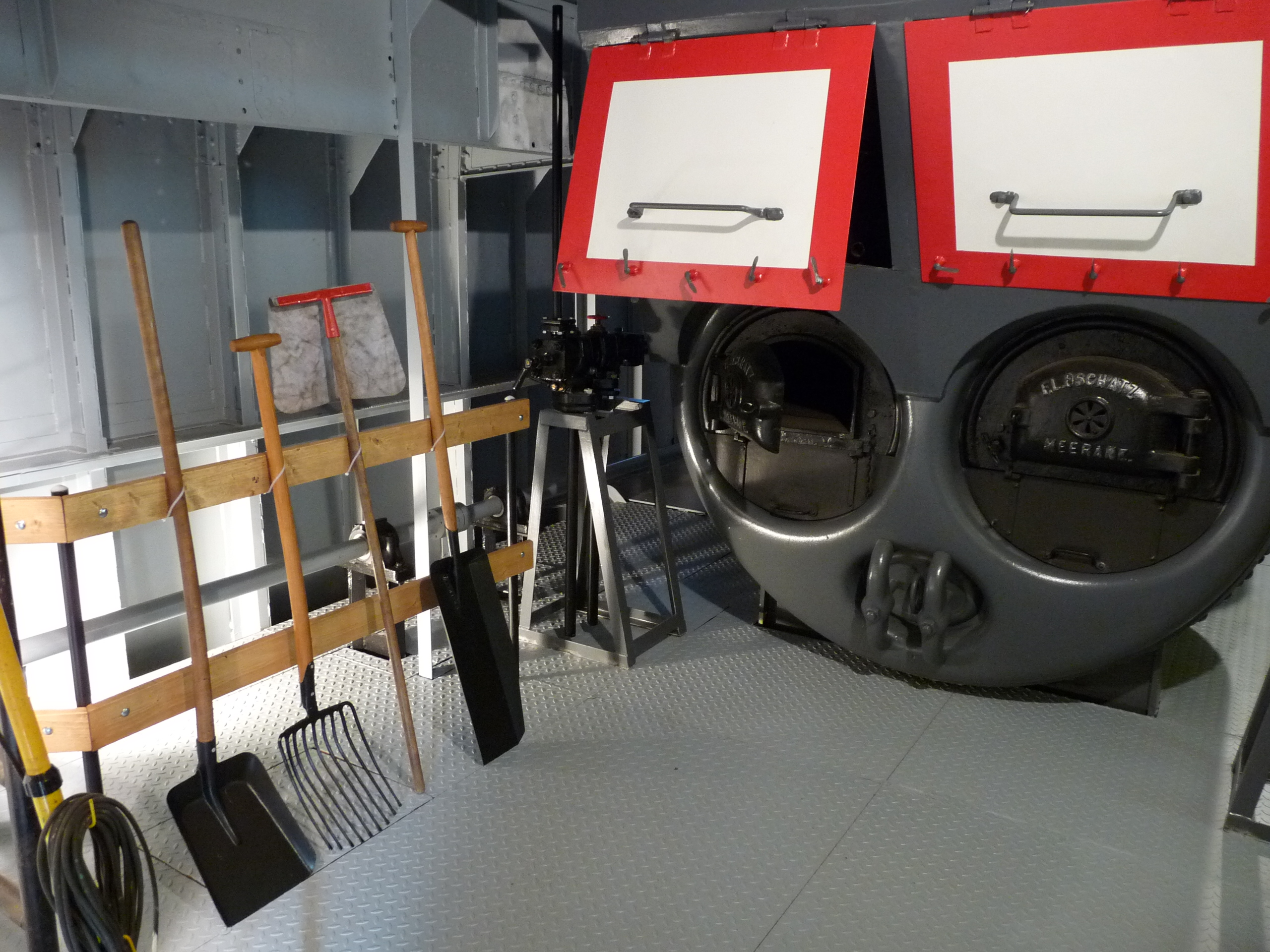
Boiler room

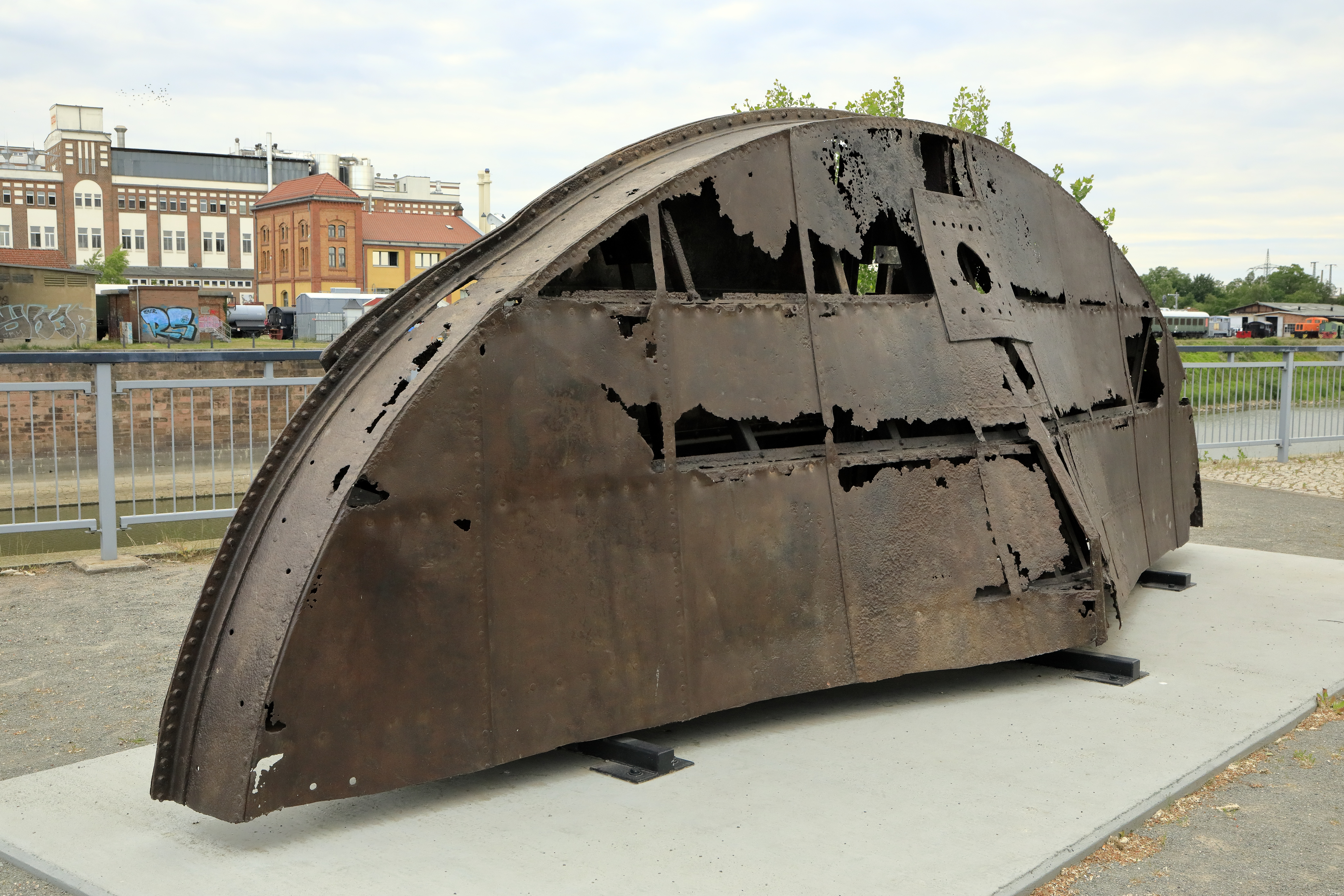
The original stern section, which had to be replaced during restoration

== Crew ==
The regular crew consisted of the captain, one engineer, two stokers, and two deckhands.

== Fate ==
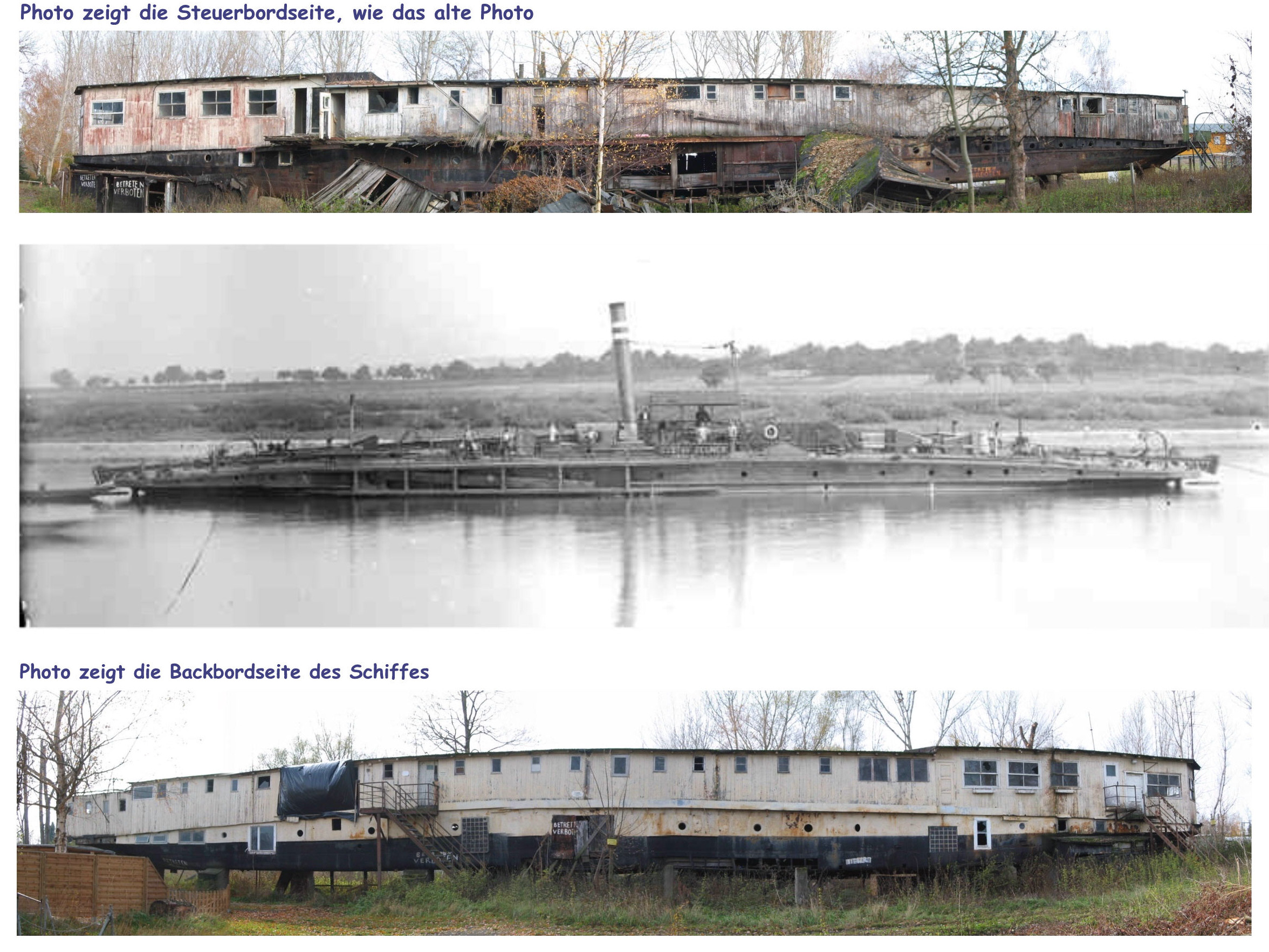
Remains of the chain tug before restoration

After chain navigation on the Elbe ended and the tug was decommissioned in 1931, the hull had various uses. In 1933 it was sold to Paul Michaelis in Magdeburg-Fermersleben, beached, fitted with wooden deck structures, and used as a boat shed and restaurant for the local water sports club. The ship lay in the area of Fermersleben Harbour 52.098808°N 11.667888°E on the western bank of the Elbe. Paddle boats stored inside were transported to the river via a cableway. Use of the tug, which also hosted weekend entertainment events, peaked again in the mid-1960s, but was later discontinued. The hull fell into decay. In 1988 the surviving hull was listed as a historic monument.

According to reports in the Magdeburger Volksstimme on 9 and 14 July 2005, the Gustav Zeuner was to be recovered through an employment-creation scheme and other contributors, made afloat again, and used as a museum ship. After clearing, sectioning, and transport to Magdeburg’s Science Harbour (formerly the Trade Harbour), detailed reconstruction and restoration began on 1 July 2006 by the “Gesellschaft für Innovation, Sanierung und Entsorgung (GISE mbH)” in cooperation with “Jobcenter ARGE Magdeburg mbH” and with support from the city of Magdeburg. Work was completed at the end of September 2010.

On 11 November 2010 the museum ship was officially handed over in the presence of Magdeburg’s Lord Mayor Lutz Trümper. The ship was not made afloat again. Its permanent exhibition site is beside the harbour basin, close to other historic floating exhibits such as a historic bucket chain excavator and the diving shaft Taucherschacht II. The site also includes a historic lift bridge and warehouse buildings, as well as numerous historic railway vehicles. The Gustav Zeuner can be visited free of charge on guided tours from Wednesday to Sunday during the summer months. In its first season, the newly restored museum steamer attracted more than 5,200 visitors.
