= Lutz Trümper =

German politician (born 1955)

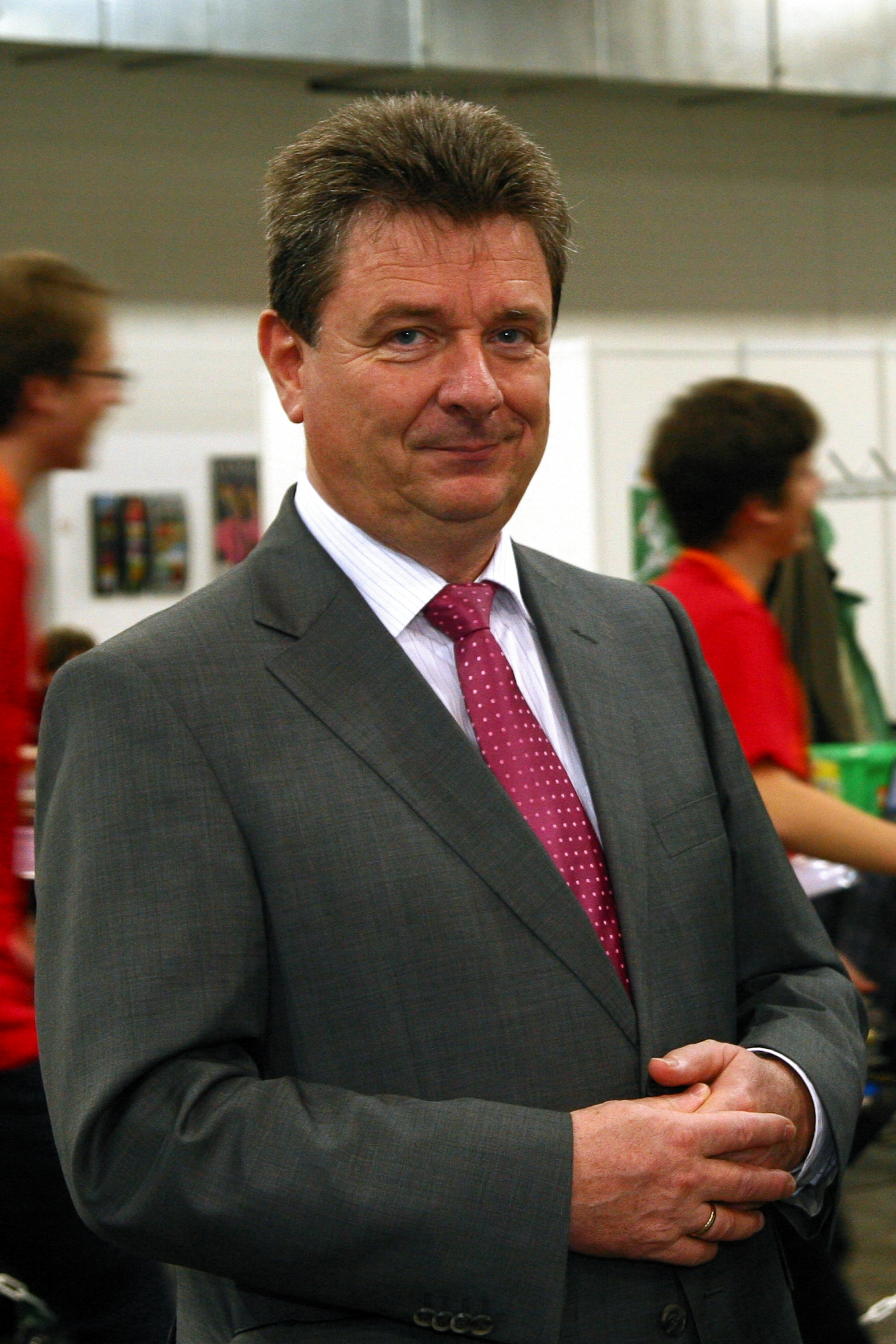
Trümper in 2012

Lutz Trümper (born 1 October 1955) is a German former politician for the Social Democratic Party of Germany (SPD) and former Mayor of the city of Magdeburg.

== Biography ==
Trümper was born 1955 in Oschersleben and became a teacher for chemistry and biology. He was Mayor of Magdeburg from 2001 to 2022. In the European migration crisis he was a sharp critic of the policy of his party SPD and left the party for some while. In January 2025, he confirmed his final resignation from the party due to dissatisfaction with the SPD's political actions.
