= Buckau (Magdeburg) =

Coordinates: 52°6′22″N 11°38′25″E

Buckau

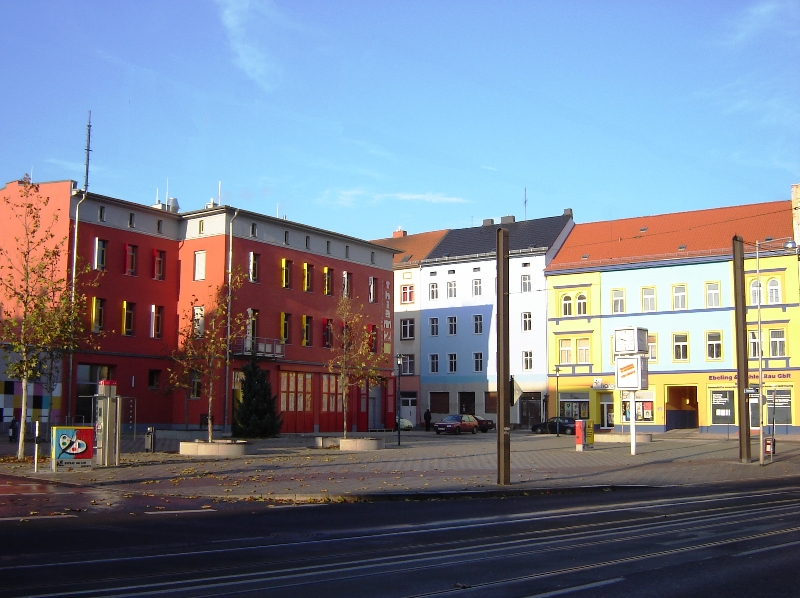
Thiemplatz

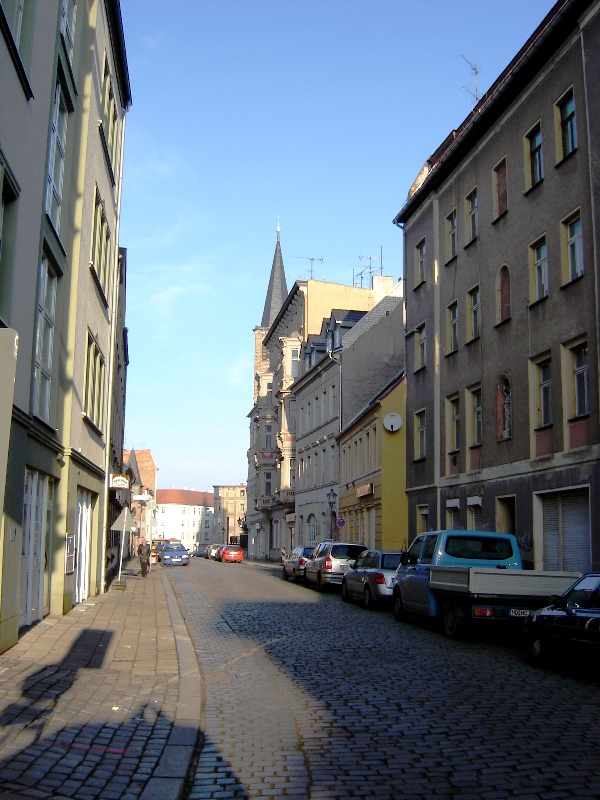
Engpass

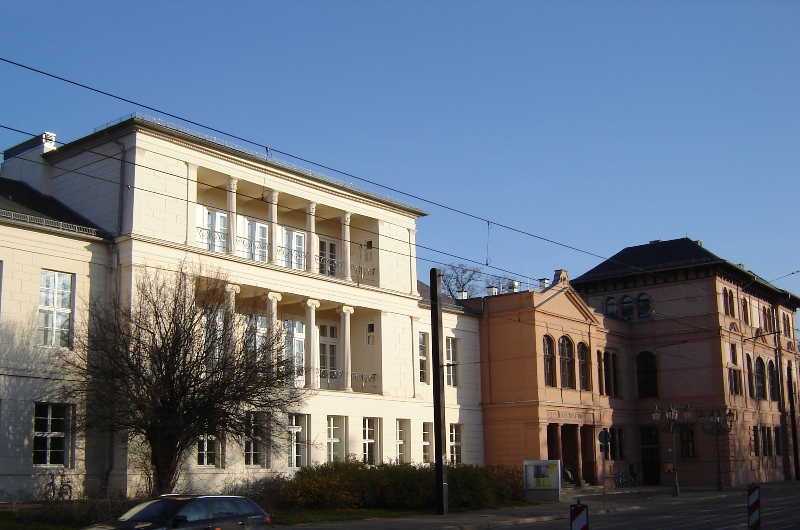
Gesellschaftshaus (1829)

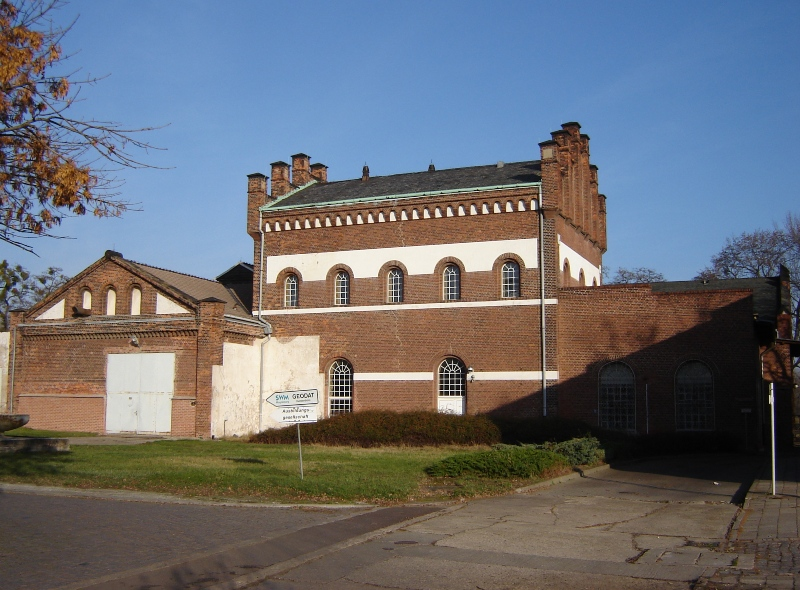
Waterworks (1856-1916)

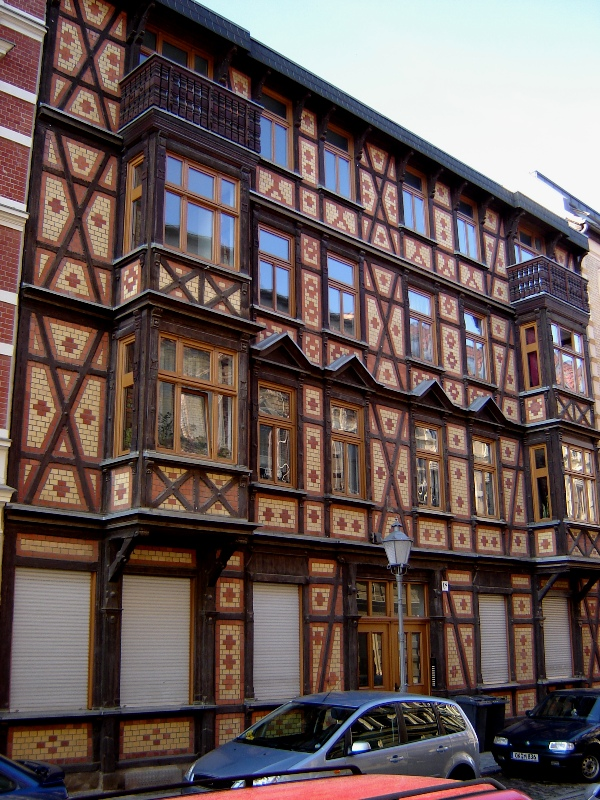
Rayon house (1890)

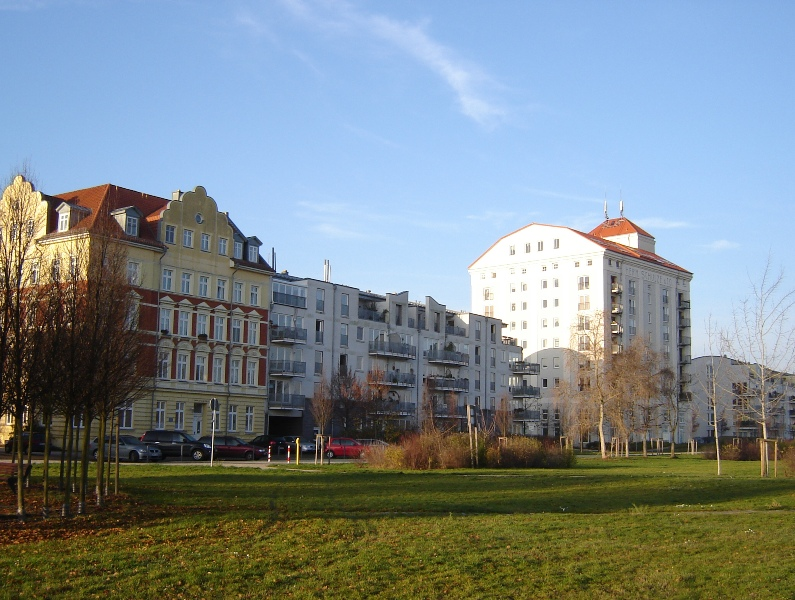
Flats by the Elbe (1998)

Buckau is a quarter of the city of Magdeburg, capital of the German state of Saxony-Anhalt. It covers an area of 2.1803 km^{2} and has a population of 6,217 (as of 31 December 2020). Its name originates from the Slavic name "Bukow". "Buk" means "beech" in Polish.

== Geography ==
Buckau lies directly on the river Elbe opposite the southern part of the Rotehorn Landscape Park. To the north, on the roads of Erich-Weinert-Straße and Schönebecker Straße towards Harnackstraße and Steubenallee is Magdeburg’s old town, the Altstadt. To the south the boundary with Fermersleben is the ‘’Schanzenweg and its projection to the banks of the Elbe.

West of Buckau, the railway line from Magdeburg to Leipzig Buckau with the S-Bahn stop of SKET-Industriepark and the roads of Schanzenweg and Schilfbreite form the boundary with the quarters of Leipziger Straße and Hopfengarten. Buckau ist also the start of the so-called chain of pearls of quarters which include Fermersleben, Salbke and Westerhüsen to the south. Apart from its northern and southern areas, the quarter is densely populated and still has several entire streets in the architectural Gründerzeit style. Buckau has its own station and is well served by local public transport services. There is a ferry over the Elbe from Buckau to the Rotehornpark.
