= 1910 =

1910 in various calendars
- Gregorian calendar: 1910; MCMX
- Ab urbe condita: 2663
- Armenian calendar: 1359; ԹՎ ՌՅԾԹ
- Assyrian calendar: 6660
- Baháʼí calendar: 66–67
- Balinese saka calendar: 1831–1832
- Bengali calendar: 1316–1317
- Berber calendar: 2860
- British Regnal year: 10 Edw. 7 – 1 Geo. 5
- Buddhist calendar: 2454
- Burmese calendar: 1272
- Byzantine calendar: 7418–7419
- Chinese calendar: 己酉年 (Earth Rooster); 4607 or 4400 — to — 庚戌年 (Metal Dog); 4608 or 4401
- Coptic calendar: 1626–1627
- Discordian calendar: 3076
- Ethiopian calendar: 1902–1903
- Hebrew calendar: 5670–5671
- Hindu calendars
- Vikram Samvat: 1966–1967
- Shaka Samvat: 1831–1832
- Kali Yuga: 5010–5011
- Holocene calendar: 11910
- Igbo calendar: 910–911
- Iranian calendar: 1288–1289
- Islamic calendar: 1327–1329
- Japanese calendar: Meiji 43 (明治４３年)
- Javanese calendar: 1839–1840
- Juche calendar: N/A
- Julian calendar: Gregorian minus 13 days
- Korean calendar: 4243
- Minguo calendar: 2 before ROC 民前2年
- Nanakshahi calendar: 442
- Thai solar calendar: 2452–2453
- Tibetan calendar: ས་མོ་བྱ་ལོ་ (female Earth-Bird); 2036 or 1655 or 883 — to — ལྕགས་ཕོ་ཁྱི་ལོ་ (male Iron-Dog); 2037 or 1656 or 884

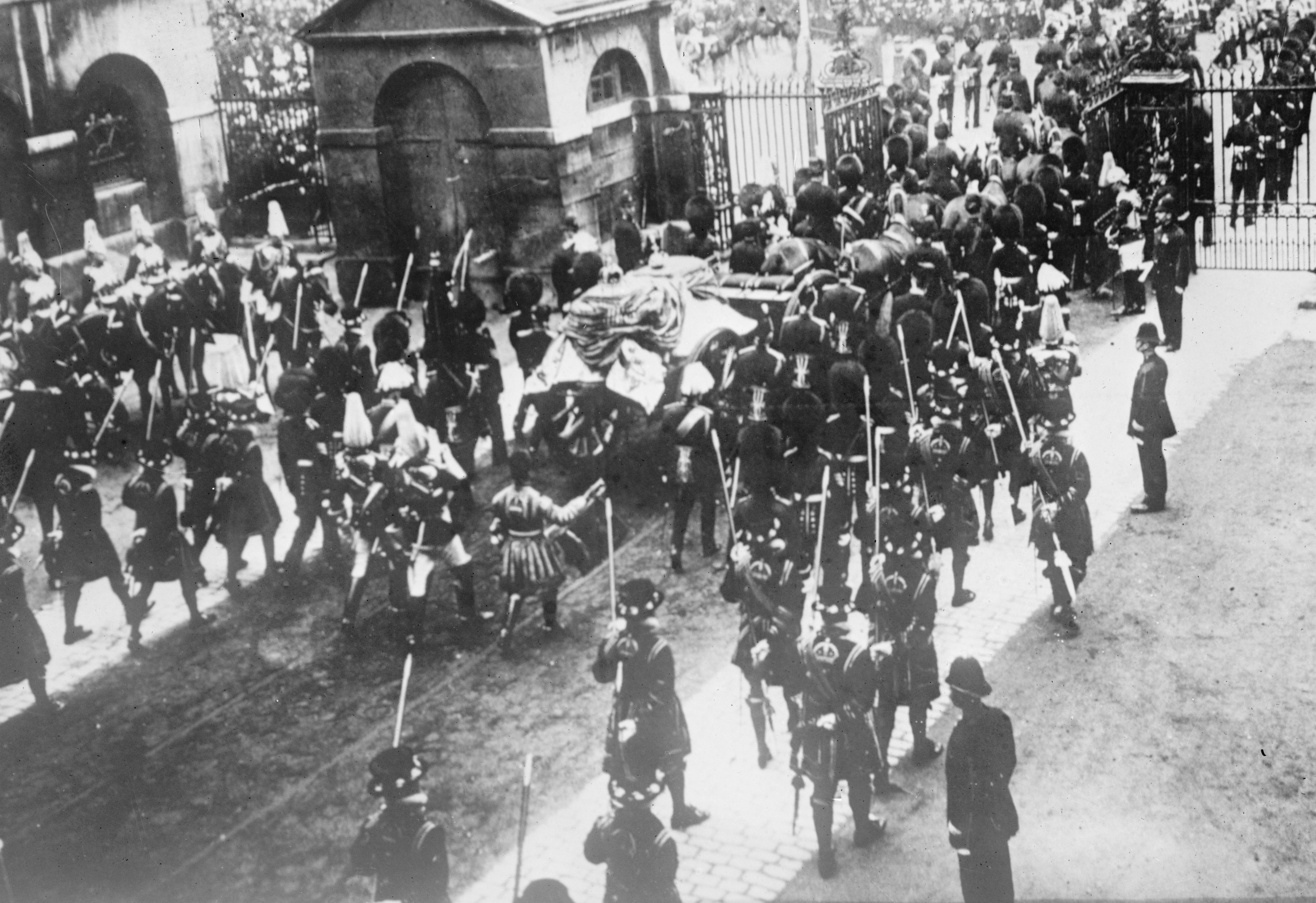
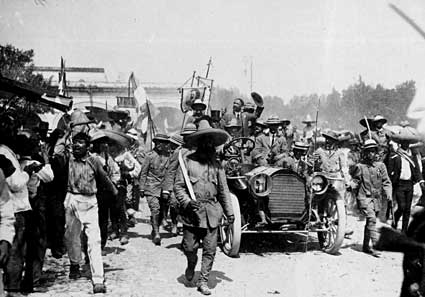
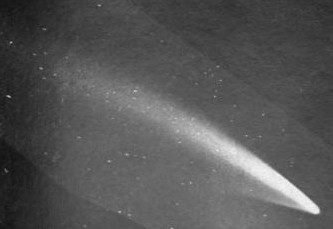
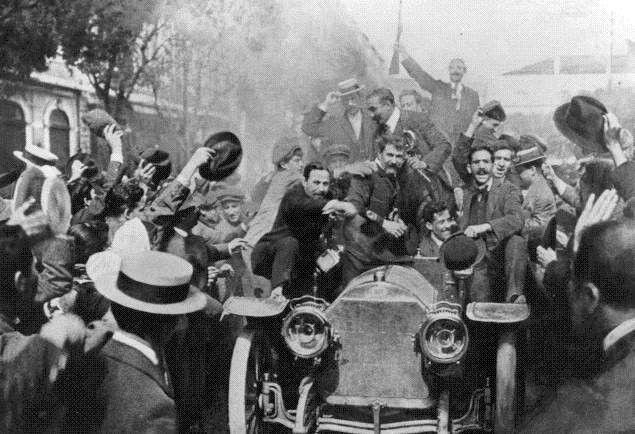
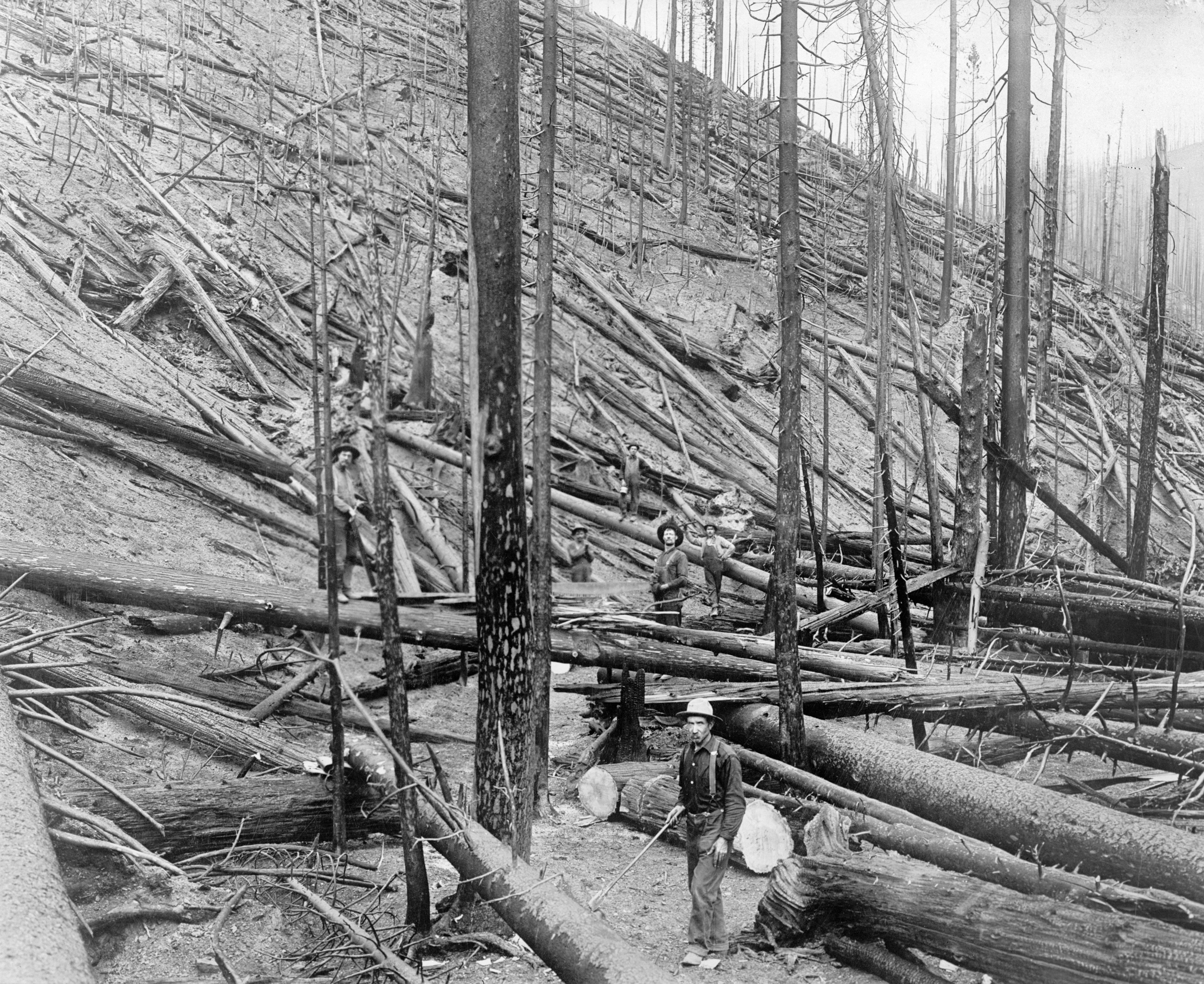
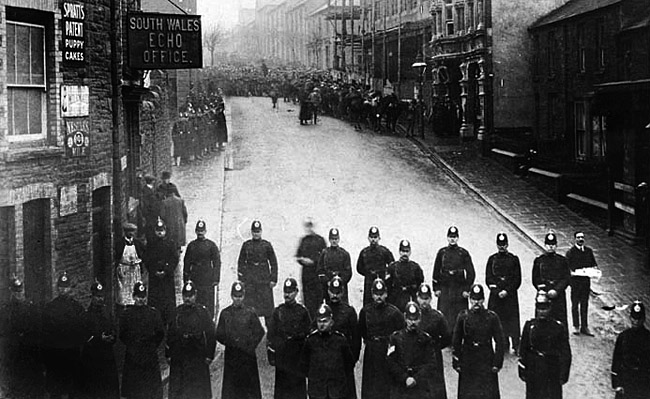
From top to bottom, left to right:
- The death of Edward VII ends the Edwardian era and begins George V's reign in the United Kingdom;
- The Mexican Revolution ignites a decade-long struggle reshaping the nation’s politics and society;
- The Great January Comet of 1910 captivates observers worldwide with a spectacular celestial display;
- The October 5, 1910 revolution in Portugal topples the monarchy and establishes the First Portuguese Republic;
- The Great Fire of 1910 burns over three million acres in the northwestern United States, one of the largest wildfires in American history;
- The Tonypandy riots erupt in Wales during a coal miners' strike, highlighting labor unrest and industrial hardships.

1910 (MCMX) was a common year starting on Saturday of the Gregorian calendar and a common year starting on Friday of the Julian calendar, the 1910th year of the Common Era (CE) and Anno Domini (AD) designations, the 910th year of the 2nd millennium, the 10th year of the 20th century, and the 1st year of the 1910s decade. As of the start of 1910, the Gregorian calendar was 13 days ahead of the Julian calendar, which remained in localized use until 1923.

== Events ==
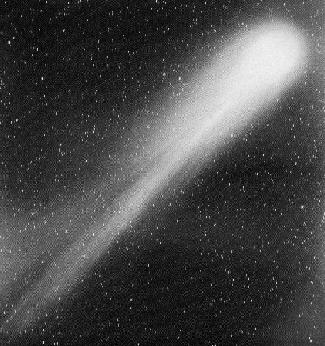
Halley's Comet's tail

=== January ===
- January 6 – Abé people in the French West Africa colony of Côte d'Ivoire rise against the colonial administration; the rebellion is brutally suppressed by the military.
- January 8 – Treaty of Punakha: The Himalayan kingdom of Bhutan becomes a protectorate of the British Empire.
- January 11 – Charcot Island is discovered by the Antarctic expedition led by French explorer Jean-Baptiste Charcot on the ship Pourquoi Pas?
- January 12 – Great January Comet of 1910 first observed (perihelion: January 17).
- January 15 – Amidst the constitutional crisis caused by the House of Lords rejecting the People's Budget, the January 1910 United Kingdom general election is held resulting in a hung parliament with neither Liberals nor Conservatives gaining a majority.
- January 21 – The Great Flood of Paris begins when the Seine overflows its banks.
- January 22 – Completion of construction of New York City's Metropolitan Life Insurance Company Tower, at 700 feet (210 m) the world's tallest building at this time, is celebrated.
- January 31
  - A coal mine explosion at the Colorado Fuel and Iron Company in Primero, Colorado, kills 75 miners.
  - American-born medical practitioner Hawley Harvey Crippen poisons his wife, Cora, and buries her body in the cellar of their London home (probable date).

=== February ===
- February 1 – A coal mine explosion at the Browder Coal Company in Drakesboro, Kentucky kills 34 miners.
- February 2 – A coal mine explosion at the Palau mine at Las Esperanzas in the State of Coahuila in Mexico kills 68 miners.
- February 5 – A coal mine explosion at the Jefferson Clearfield Coal Company mine at Ernest, Pennsylvania, kills 11 miners (10 Hungarian) but another 110 are able to escape.
- February 9 – French liner General Chanzy sinks in the Mediterranean after striking rocks off Menorca, with only one survivor of the 157 on board.
- February 12 – Chinese expedition to Tibet: A force of 2,000 Chinese troops march into Lhasa, the capital of Tibet; the 13th Dalai Lama, Thubten Gyatso, is forced to flee to British India.
- February 20 – Boutros Ghali, the first native-born Prime Minister of Egypt, is assassinated in Cairo.

=== March ===
- March – Albanian revolt of 1910: An uprising against Ottoman rule breaks out in Albania.
- March 1 – The Wellington, Washington avalanche sweeps away two Great Northern Railway (U.S.) passenger trains in the Cascade Mountains, killing 96, making it the worst snowslide accident in United States history.
- March 3 – Morocco signs accords with France in Paris, permitting the French to occupy Casablanca and Oujda in return for military training, as part of refinancing of loans.
- March 4 – The Rogers Pass avalanche buries a group of Canadian Pacific Railway workers clearing tracks in the Selkirk Mountains at Rogers Pass (British Columbia), making it the worst snowslide accident in Canadian history.
- March 8 – In France, Raymonde de Laroche is awarded Pilot's license No. 36 by the Federation Aeronautique Internationale, becoming the first woman authorized to fly an airplane.
- March 10
  - Slavery in China, which has existed since the Shang dynasty, is made illegal.
  - Release of In Old California, the first film made in Hollywood, California, directed by D. W. Griffith.
- March 17 – Progressive Republicans in the United States House of Representatives rebel against Speaker Joseph Gurney Cannon, removing him from the Rules Committee and stripping him of his power to appoint committee chairmen.
- March 18 – The first filmed version of Mary Shelley's Frankenstein comes out. Considered to be the first horror movie, it stars actor Charles Ogle as the monster.
- March 20 – The first clinic for treatment of occupational diseases is opened in Milan (Italy).
- March 23 – A rebellion by Rif tribesmen in Spanish Morocco is finally suppressed after 8 months. During the conflict, an estimated 8,000 Berbers and 2,000 Spanish soldiers have been killed.
- March 27 – A fire during a barn-dance in Ököritófülpös, Hungary, kills 312 people after ballroom decorations catch alight.

=== April ===
- April 5 – The Transandine Railway connecting Chile and Argentina is inaugurated.
- April 10 – Halley's Comet becomes visible with the naked eye (perihelion: April 20); Earth passes through its tail about May 19 (its next visit will be in 1986).

=== May ===
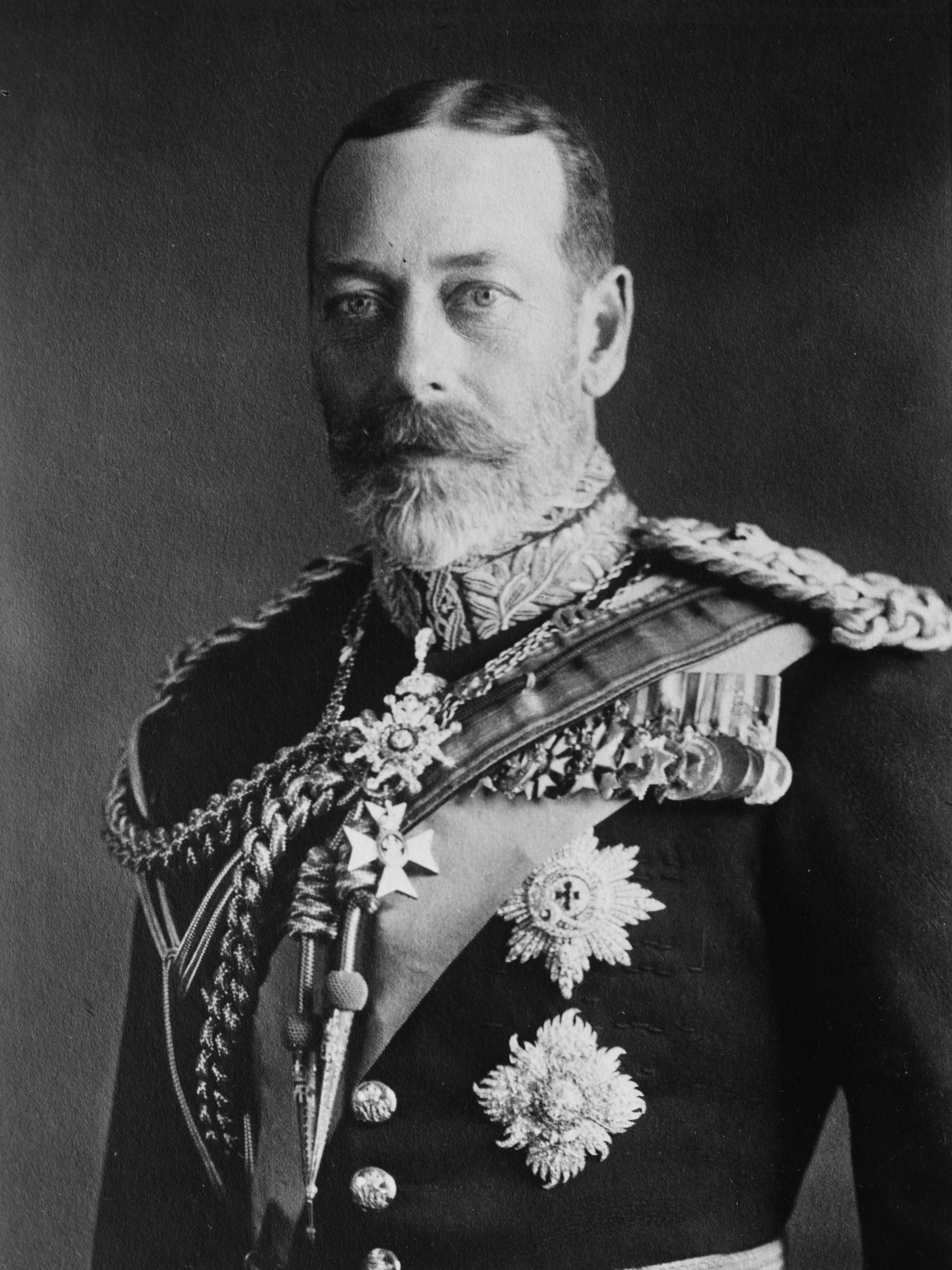
May 6: King George V

- May 6 – George V becomes King of the United Kingdom of Great Britain and Ireland upon the death of his father, Edward VII.
- May 31 – The Union of South Africa is created.

=== June ===
- June 2 – Charles Rolls became the first person to fly across the English Channel and back without stopping.
- June 3 – The Norwegian Antarctic Expedition, led by Roald Amundsen on the steamer Fram, departs from Christiania (modern-day Oslo). No announcement until later in the year of Amundsen's intention to reach the South Pole.
- June 5 – The Nanyang industrial exposition ("Nanking Exposition"), an official world's fair, opens in Qing dynasty China.
- June 14–23 – Edinburgh Missionary Conference is held in Scotland, presided over by John Mott, launching the modern ecumenical movement and the modern missions movement.
- June 15 – The British Antarctic Expedition, led by Robert Falcon Scott on the whaler Terra Nova, departs from Cardiff for the South Pole.
- June 22 – DELAG Zeppelin dirigible Deutschland makes the first commercial passenger flight, from Friedrichshafen to Düsseldorf in Germany; the flight takes 9 hours.
- June 25 – The ballet The Firebird, the first major work by Russian composer Igor Stravinsky, commissioned by Diaghilev's Ballets Russes, is premièred in Paris, bringing the composer international fame.

=== July ===
- July – First Girl Guide troops registered in the United Kingdom, under the supervision of Agnes Baden-Powell.
- July 4 – Jack Johnson defeats James J. Jeffries by technical knockout in the 15th round at Reno, Nevada, in the bout billed as the "Fight of the Century". Johnson retains his world heavyweight boxing title over the previously undefeated Jeffries, who had been promoted as boxing's "Great White Hope". The result sparks race riots across more than 25 states, leaving at least 20 people dead.
- July 9–10 – 'Fowler's match': the Eton v Harrow cricket match at Lord's ground in London, known after the captain of Eton College, Robert St Leger Fowler, and described as "what might just be the greatest cricket match of all time".
- July 12 – Charles Rolls becomes the first British aviation fatality when his French-built Wright aeroplane suffers a broken rudder at an altitude of 80 feet (24 meters) and crashes during a contest at Bournemouth.
- July 22 – A Wireless telegraph sent from the SS Montrose results in the identification, arrest and execution of murderer Dr. Crippen.
- July 24 – Ottoman forces capture the city of Shkodër to put down the Albanian Revolt of 1910.

=== August ===
- August 20 – The Great Fire of 1910 ("Big Blowup"), a wildfire that burns 4,700 square miles in the Inland Northwest of the United States, due to dry weather.
- August 22 – The Japan–Korea Treaty of 1910, by which the Empire of Japan formally annexes the Korean Empire, is signed (it becomes effectively void in 1945, which is formally recognised in 1965).
- August 28 – Montenegro is proclaimed an independent kingdom, under Nicholas I.
- August 29 – Emperor Sunjong of Korea abdicates and the country's monarchy is abolished.

=== September ===
- September 1 – Sport Club Corinthians Paulista is founded in Brazil by railwaymen; its Association football team will be the first FIFA Club World Cup champions in 2000.

=== October ===
- October
  - Infrared photographs are first published by Professor Robert Williams Wood, in the Royal Photographic Society's journal.
  - Approximate date of origin of Manchurian plague, a form of pneumonic plague which by December is spreading through northeastern China, killing more than 40,000.
- October 5 – 5 October 1910 revolution: The First Portuguese Republic is proclaimed in Lisbon; King Manuel II of Portugal flees to England.
- October 7 – Baudette fire of 1910, a wildfire that burns ca. 350,000 square miles in Minnesota and Ontario, including several towns.
- October 20 – The hull of White Star ocean liner RMS Olympic is launched, at the Harland and Wolff shipyards in Belfast.
- October 23 – Vajiravudh (Rama VI) is crowned King of Siam, after the death of his father, King Chulalongkorn (Rama V).

=== November ===
- November 7 – The first air flight for the purpose of delivering commercial freight takes place in the United States. The flight, made by Wright brothers pilot Philip Parmalee, is between Dayton and Columbus, Ohio.
- November 14 – In the first takeoff from a ship by a fixed-wing aircraft, Eugene Ely takes off from a temporary platform erected over the bow of the light cruiser USS Birmingham in Hampton Roads, Virginia.
- November 18 – Black Friday: 300 suffragettes clash with police outside the Parliament of the United Kingdom over the failure of the Conciliation Bill.
- November 20 – The Mexican Revolution begins, when Francisco I. Madero proclaims the elections of 1910 null and void, and calls for an armed revolution against the illegitimate presidency/dictatorship of Porfirio Díaz.
- November 22 – Revolt of the Lash at Rio de Janeiro: Mutineers in the Brazilian Navy, led by João Cândido, seize control of the new dreadnought battleship Minas Geraes and other ships, whose guns are aimed at the city as the crews demand improvements in their conditions (which are conceded on November 26 by the Brazilian government).

=== December ===
- December 3 – Modern neon lighting is first demonstrated by Georges Claude at the Paris Motor Show.
- December 10 – Giacomo Puccini's opera La fanciulla del West has its world première at the Metropolitan Opera in New York City, conducted by Arturo Toscanini and starring Enrico Caruso and Emmy Destinn.
- December 19 – The second 1910 United Kingdom general election (the last to be fought with an all-male electorate) concludes with confirmation of a majority for the Liberal Party in alliance with the Irish Parliamentary Party, resolving the battle of wills between the House of Commons of the United Kingdom and the House of Lords by giving a majority for restriction of the powers of the Lords and support for the Irish Home Rule movement.
- December 21 – Pretoria Pit disaster: a coal mine explosion at the Hulton Colliery Company of Westhoughton in Lancashire, England, kills 344 miners, with just one survivor.

=== Undated ===
- Henry Ford sells 10,000 automobiles.
- Hitachi, an electromechanics company, is founded as a mining machine repair factory in Ibaraki Prefecture, Japan.

== Births ==
=== January ===
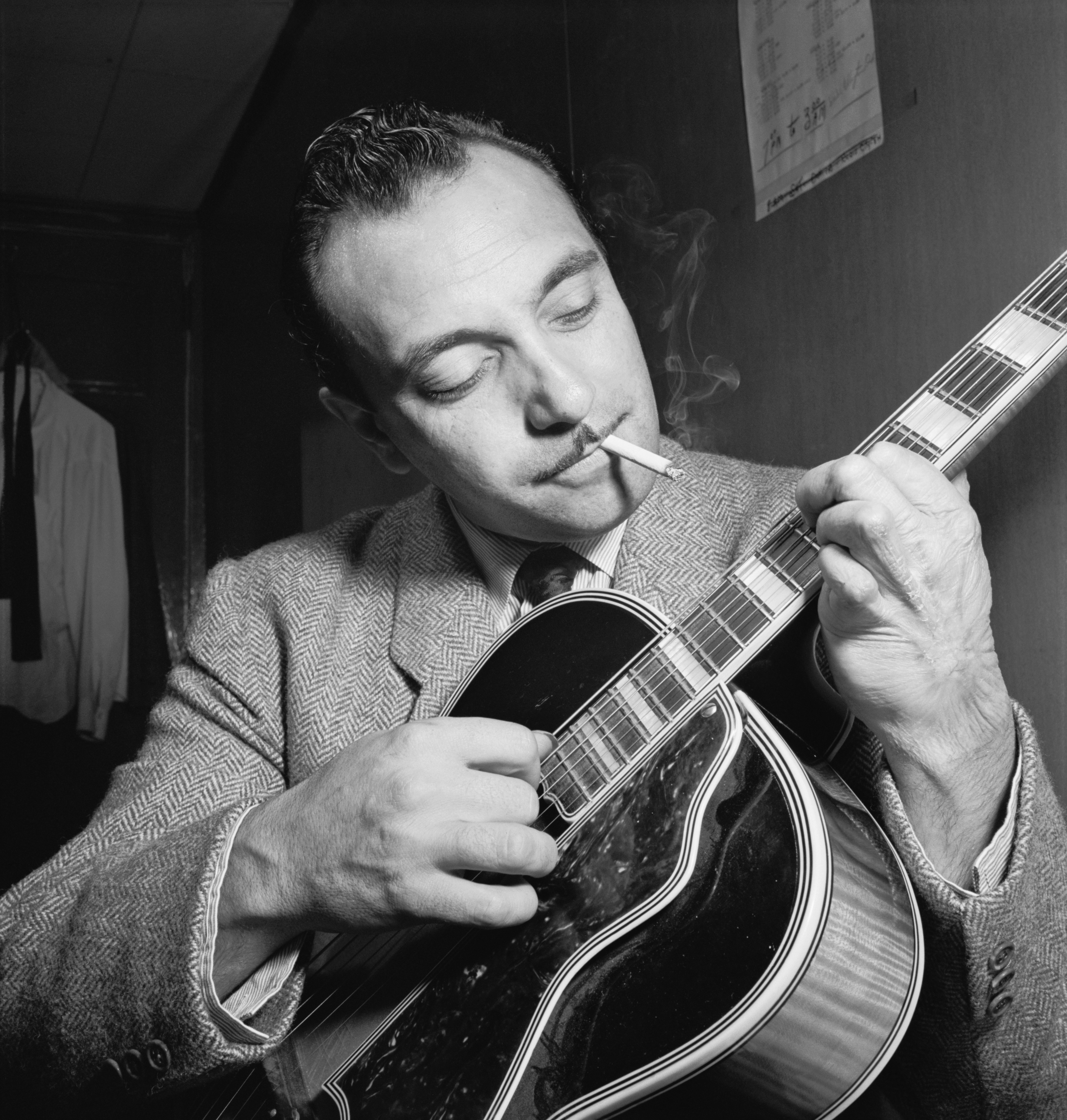
Django Reinhardt

- January 4
  - Josephine McKim, American Olympic swimmer (d. 1992)
  - Hilde Schrader, German swimmer (d. 1966)
- January 5 – Jack Lovelock, New Zealand Olympic athlete (d. 1949)
- January 6 – James "Lugs" Branigan, Irish police detective and boxer (d. 1986)
- January 8 – Galina Ulanova, Russian dancer (d. 1998)
- January 10 – Allal al-Fassi, Moroccan politician, writer, poet and Islamic scholar (d. 1974)
- January 11 – Trygve Bratteli, Norwegian politician, Prime Minister of Norway (d. 1984)
- January 12
  - Luise Rainer, German-born actress (d. 2014)
  - Patsy Kelly, American actress and comedian (d. 1981)
- January 21 – Károly Takács, Hungarian Olympic shooter (d. 1976)
- January 23 – Django Reinhardt, Romani-French jazz musician (d. 1953)
- January 27 – Edvard Kardelj, Yugoslav political leader, partisan (d. 1979)
- January 28 – John Banner, Austrian-born American actor (d. 1973)

=== February ===
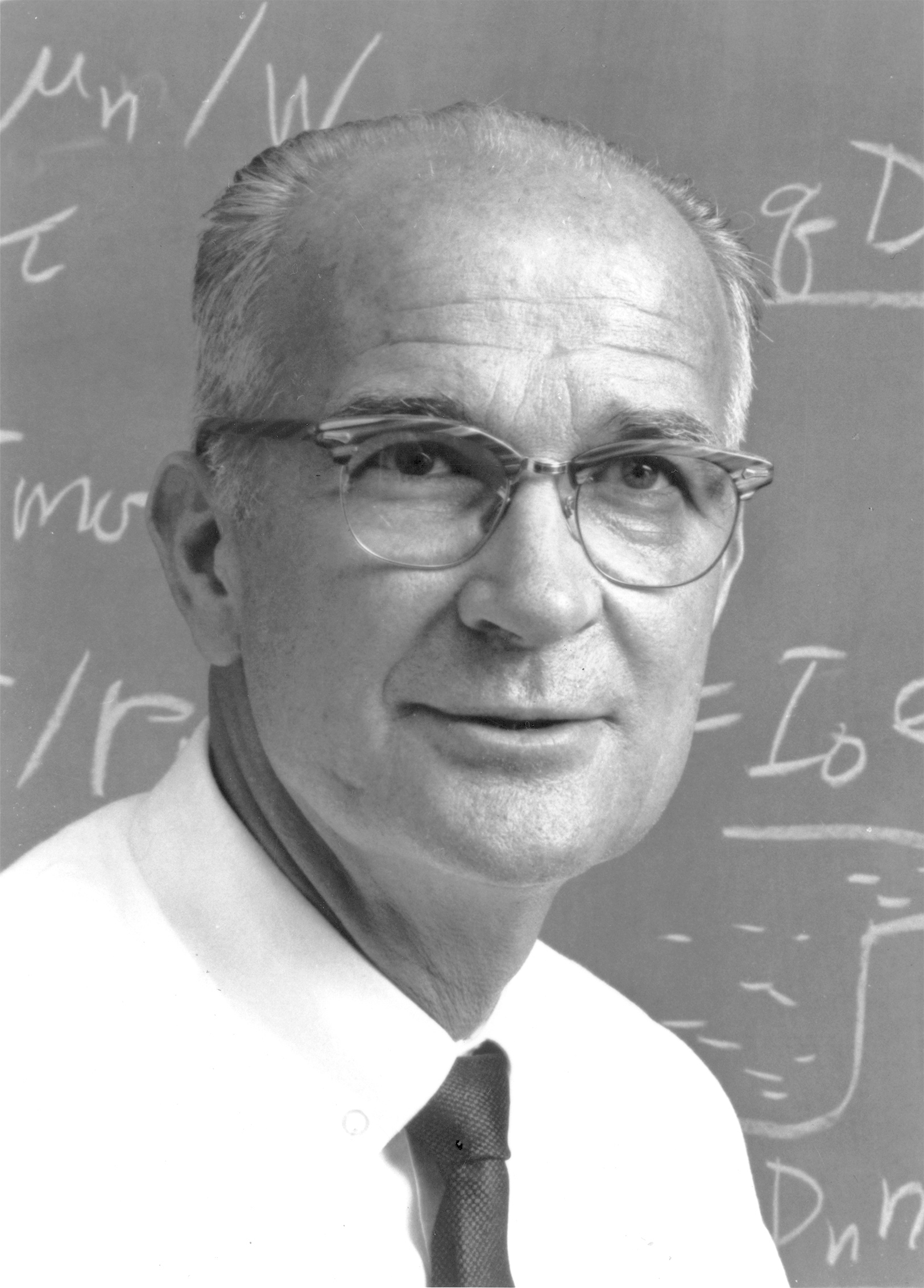
William Shockley

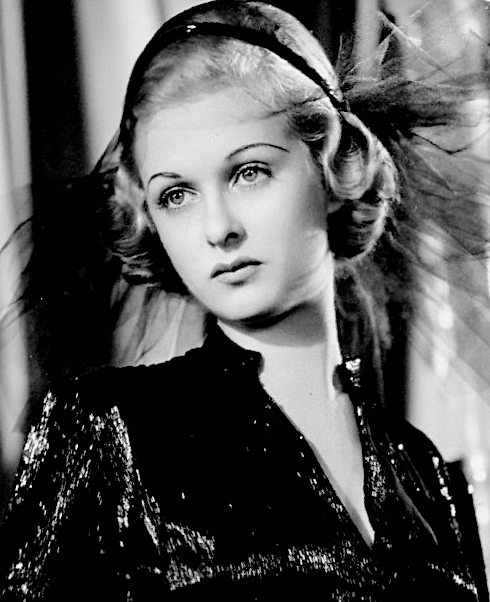
Joan Bennett

- February 5 – Francisco Varallo, Argentine footballer (d. 2010)
- February 9 – Jacques Monod, French biologist, Nobel Prize laureate (d. 1976)
- February 10 – Georges Pire, Belgian monk and humanitarian, Nobel Prize laureate (d. 1969)
- February 13 – William Shockley, American physicist, Nobel Prize laureate (d. 1989)
- February 15 – Irena Sendler, Polish humanitarian (d. 2008)
- February 17 – Marc Lawrence, American actor (d. 2005)
- February 21 – Douglas Bader, British fighter pilot (d. 1982)
- February 27 – Joan Bennett, American actress (d. 1990)

=== March ===
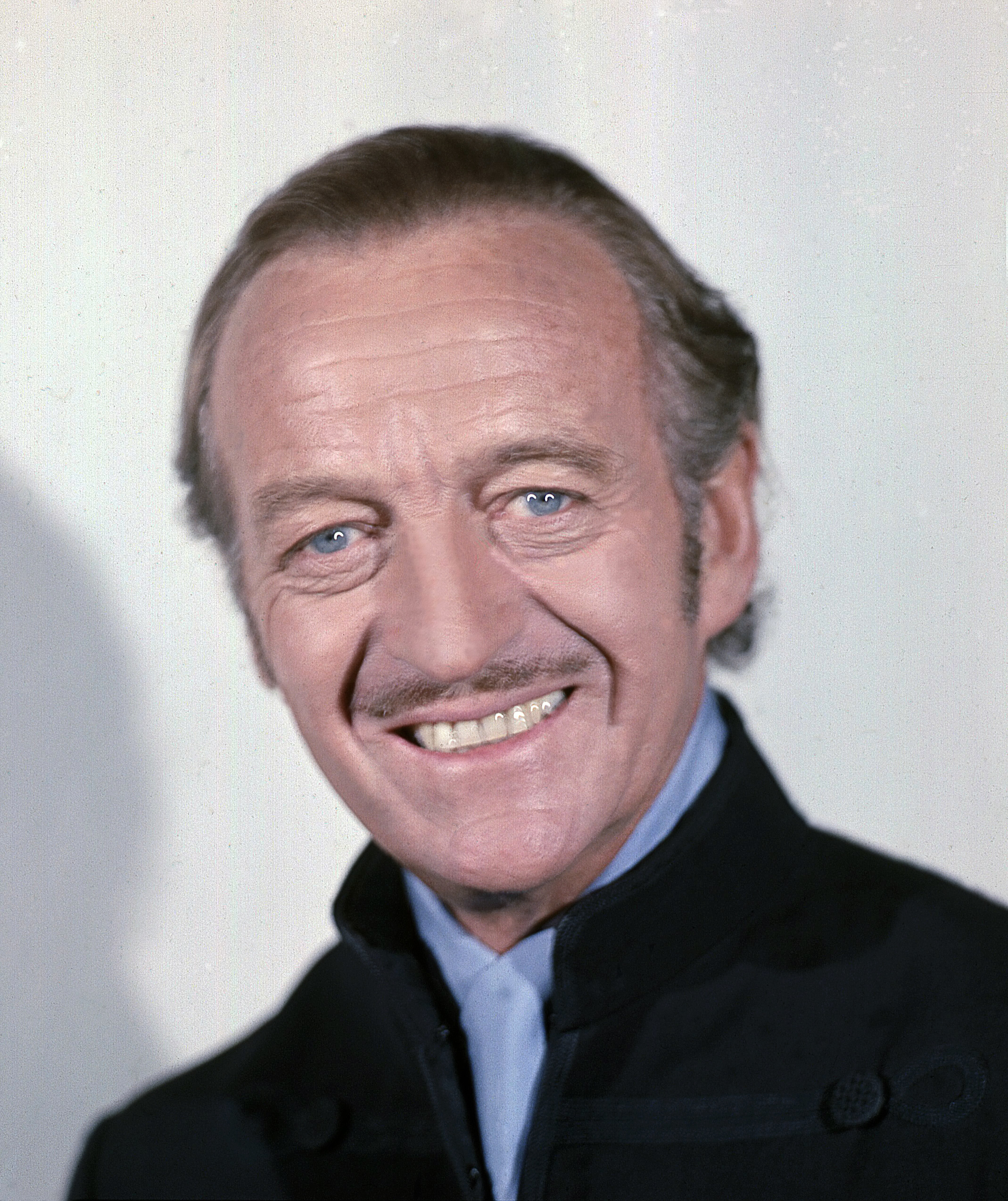
David Niven

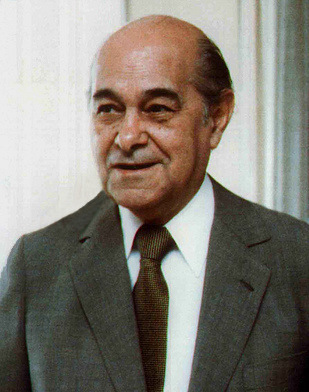
Tancredo Neves

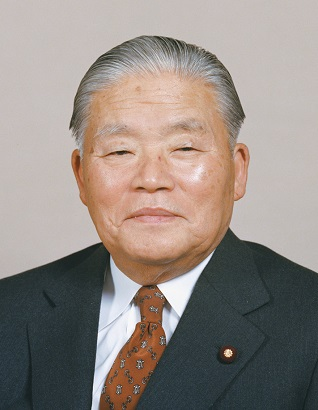
Masayoshi Ōhira

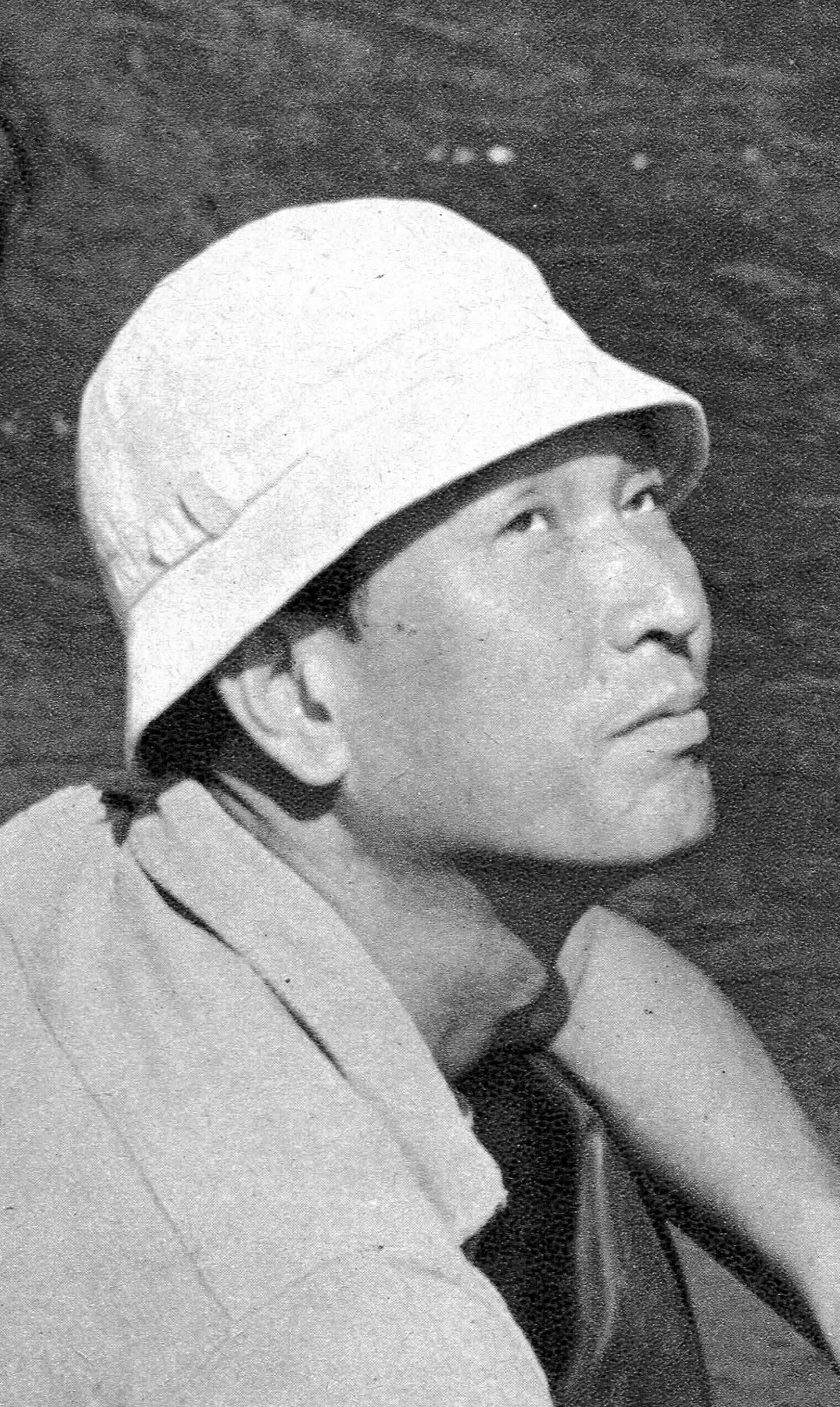
Akira Kurosawa

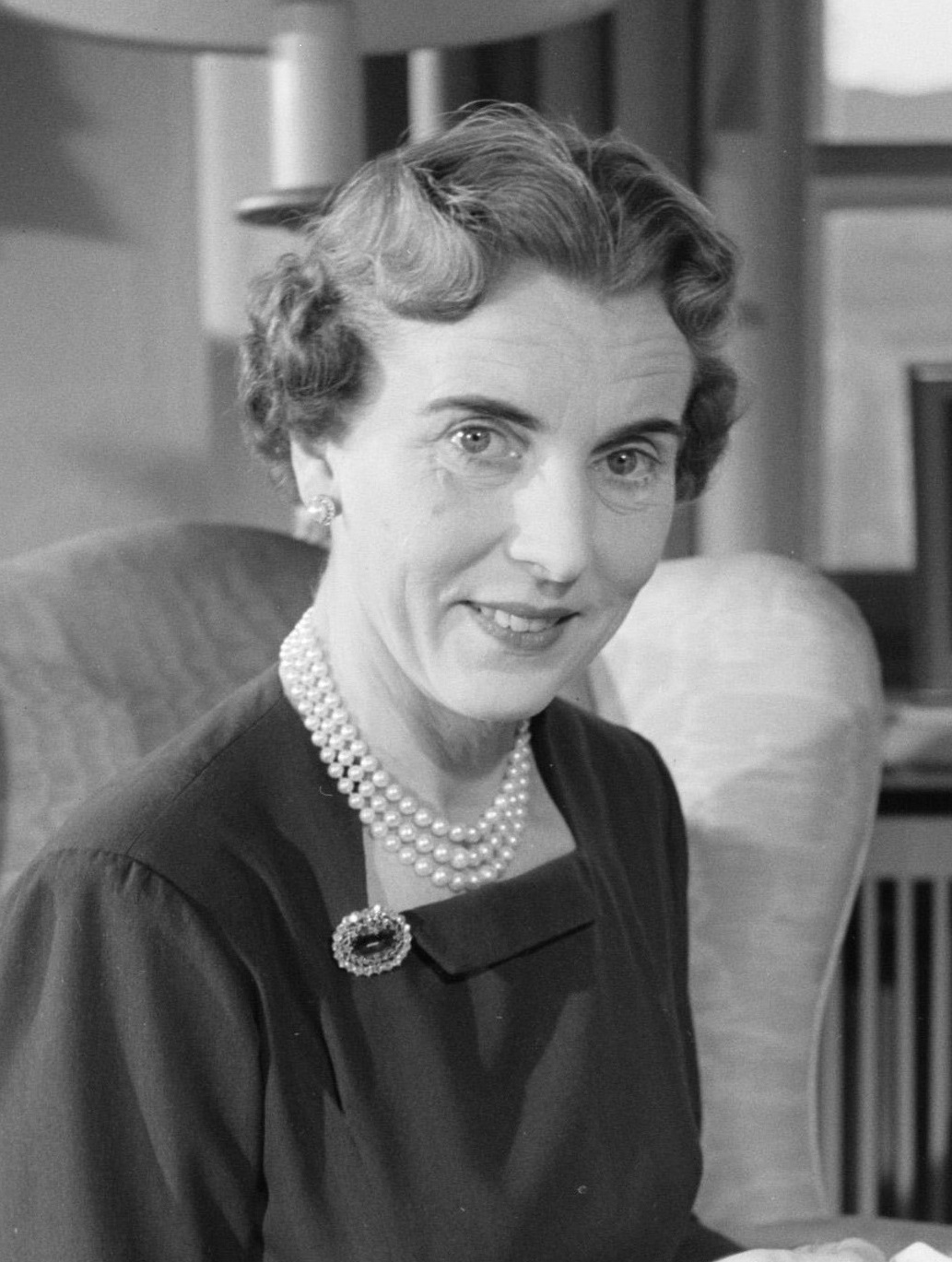
Ingrid of Sweden

- March 1
  - Archer Martin, British chemist, Nobel Prize laureate (d. 2002)
  - David Niven, British actor (d. 1983)
- March 4 – Tancredo Neves, President of Brazil (d. 1985)
- March 5
  - Momofuku Ando, Japanese inventor, businessman (d. 2007)
  - Ennio Flaiano, Italian screenwriter, playwright, novelist, journalist and drama critic (d. 1972)
- March 8 – Claire Trevor, American actress (d. 2000)
- March 9 – Samuel Barber, American composer (d. 1981)
- March 11 – Jacinta Marto, Portuguese saint (d. 1920)
- March 12 – Masayoshi Ōhira, Prime Minister of Japan (d. 1980)
- March 16 – Aladár Gerevich, Hungarian fencer (d. 1991)
- March 21 – Muhammad Siddiq Khan, Bangladeshi academic and librarian (d. 1978)
- March 23 – Akira Kurosawa, Japanese screenwriter, producer and director (d. 1998)
- March 24 – Richard Halsey Best, US Navy pilot (d. 2001)
- March 25 – Magda Olivero, Italian soprano (d. 2014)
- March 27 – Hugh Nibley, American scholar and Latter-day Saint apologist (d. 2005)
- March 28 – Ingrid of Sweden, Queen consort of Denmark (d. 2000)

=== April ===
- April 2 – Chico Xavier, Brazilian medium (d. 2002)
- April 4 – Barthélemy Boganda, 1st Prime Minister of the Central African Republic (d. 1959)
- April 9 – Nouhak Phoumsavanh, 3rd President of Laos (d. 2008)
- April 10
  - Paul Sweezy, American economist, editor (d. 2004)
  - Abdel Halim Muhammad, Sudanese physician and political activist (d. 2009)
- April 11 – António de Spínola, 14th President of Portugal (d. 1996)
- April 14 – Stanisław Kowalski, Polish supercentenarian, athlete (d. 2022)
- April 23
  - Yolande Le Calvez, French geologist, palaeontologist, geological engineer (d. 2001)
  - Simone Simon, French actress (d. 2005)
- April 26 – Tomoyuki Tanaka, Japanese film producer (d. 1997)
- April 27
  - Chiang Ching-kuo, President of the Republic of China (d. 1988)
  - Pascoal Ranieri Mazzilli, 2-time President of Brazil (d. 1975)
- April 30 – Levi Celerio, Filipino composer, lyricist (d. 2002)

=== May ===
- May 1
  - Raya Dunayevskaya, Russian-born philosopher, founder of Marxist humanism in the United States (d. 1987)
  - J. Allen Hynek, American astronomer, ufologist (d. 1986)
- May 12
  - Johan Ferrier, 1st President of Suriname (d. 2010)
  - Dorothy Hodgkin, British chemist, Nobel Prize laureate (d. 1994)
  - Giulietta Simionato, Italian mezzo-soprano (d. 2010)
- May 23
  - Scatman Crothers, African-American actor, musician (d. 1986)
  - Artie Shaw, American clarinetist, bandleader (d. 2004)
- May 24 – Ne Win, 4th President of Burma (d. 2002)
- May 28
  - Rachel Kempson, English actress (d. 2003)
  - T-Bone Walker, American singer, guitarist (d. 1975)
- May 29 – Ralph Metcalfe, American athlete (d. 1978)

=== June ===
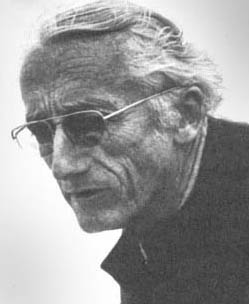
Jacques Cousteau

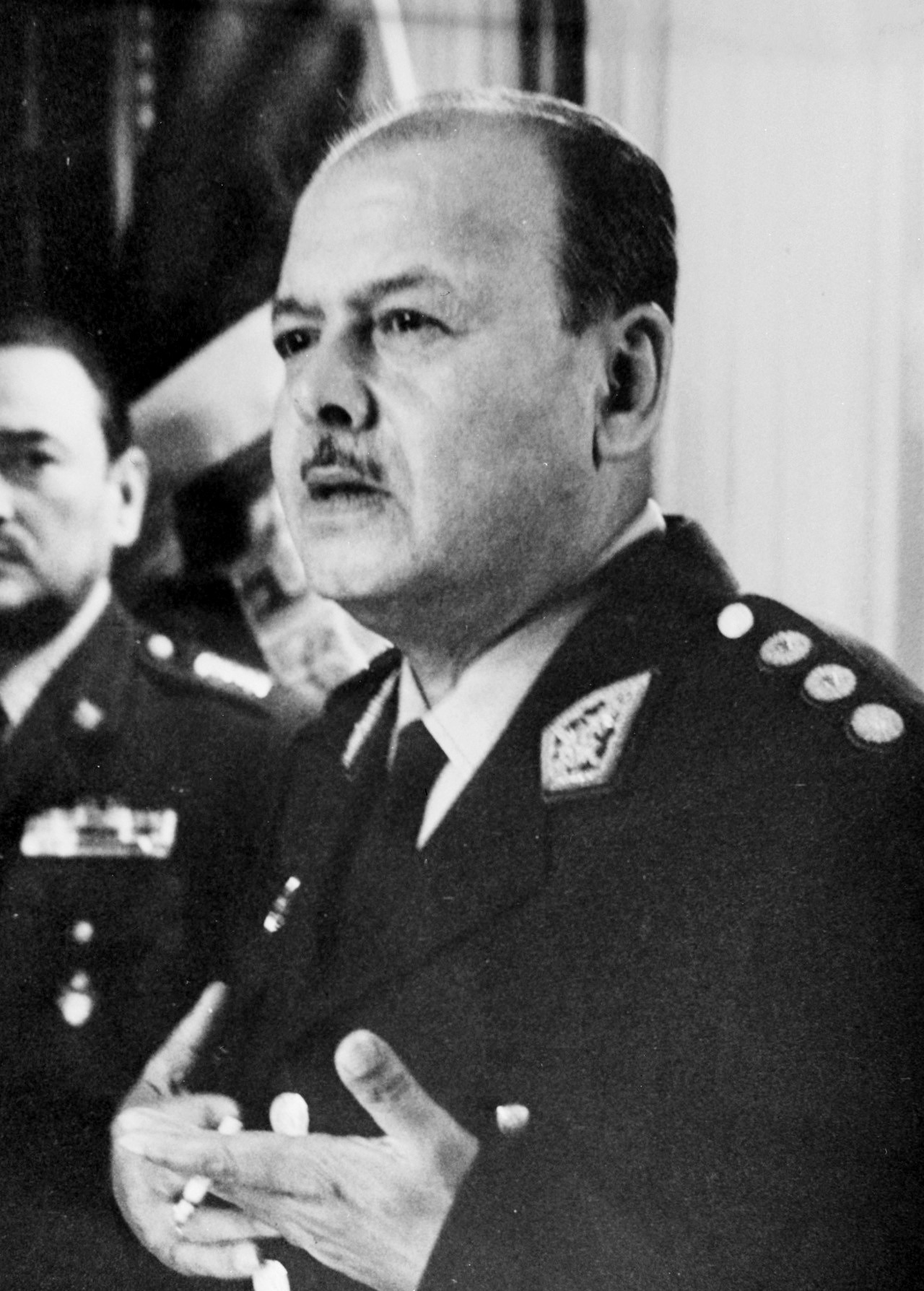
Juan Velasco Alvarado

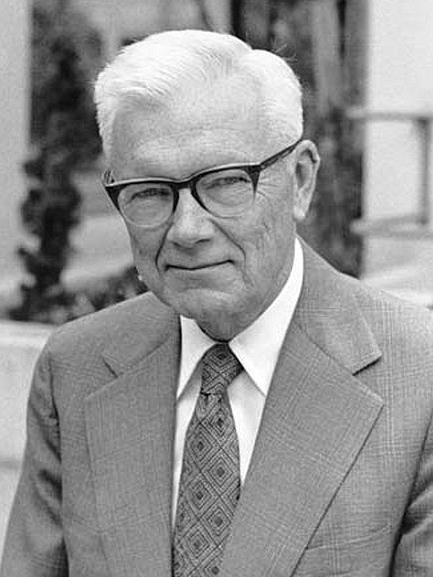
Paul Flory

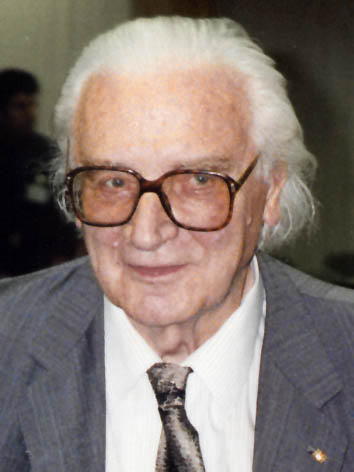
Konrad Zuse

- June 1 – Gyula Kállai, 48th Prime Minister of Hungary (d. 1996)
- June 4 – Christopher Cockerell, British engineer, inventor of the hovercraft (d. 1999)
- June 7 – Til Kiwe, German actor and screenwriter (d. 1995)
- June 9 – Robert Cummings, American actor (d. 1990)
- June 10
  - Abdul Rahman al-Eryani, President of the Yemen Arab Republic (d. 1998)
  - Armen Takhtajan, Soviet-Armenian botanist (d. 2009)
  - Howlin' Wolf, American blues musician (d. 1976)
- June 11 – Jacques Cousteau, French naval officer, explorer (d. 1997)
- June 12 – Ahmadu Bello, Nigerian politician, premier of Northern Nigeria (d. 1966)
- June 13 – Mary Wickes, American actress (d. 1995)
- June 14 – Rudolf Kempe, German conductor (d. 1976)
- June 15
  - Suleiman Frangieh, 10th President of Lebanon (d. 1992)
  - Alf Pearson, British variety performer with his brother Bob as half of Bob and Alf Pearson (d. 2012)
- June 16 – Juan Velasco Alvarado, general and President of Peru (d. 1977)
- June 17 – Red Foley, American country music singer (d. 1968)
- June 19
  - Paul Flory, American chemist, Nobel Prize laureate (d. 1985)
  - Abe Fortas, Associate Justice of the Supreme Court of the United States (d. 1982)
- June 22
  - Peter Pears, English tenor (d. 1986)
  - Konrad Zuse, German engineer (d. 1995)
- June 23
  - Jean Anouilh, French dramatist (d. 1987)
  - Gordon B. Hinckley, 15th president of the Church of Jesus Christ of Latter-day Saints (d. 2008)

=== July ===
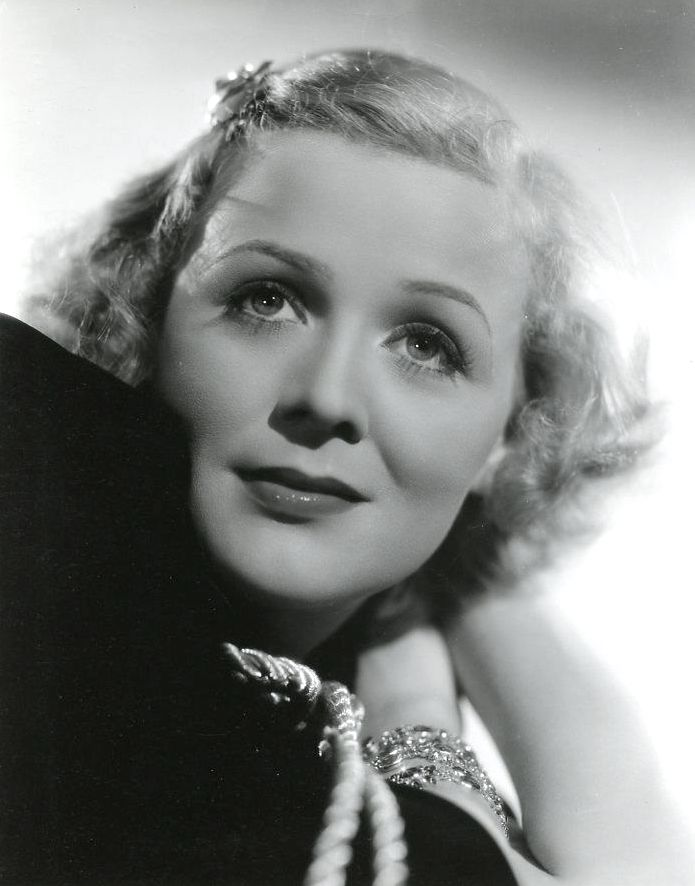
Gloria Stuart

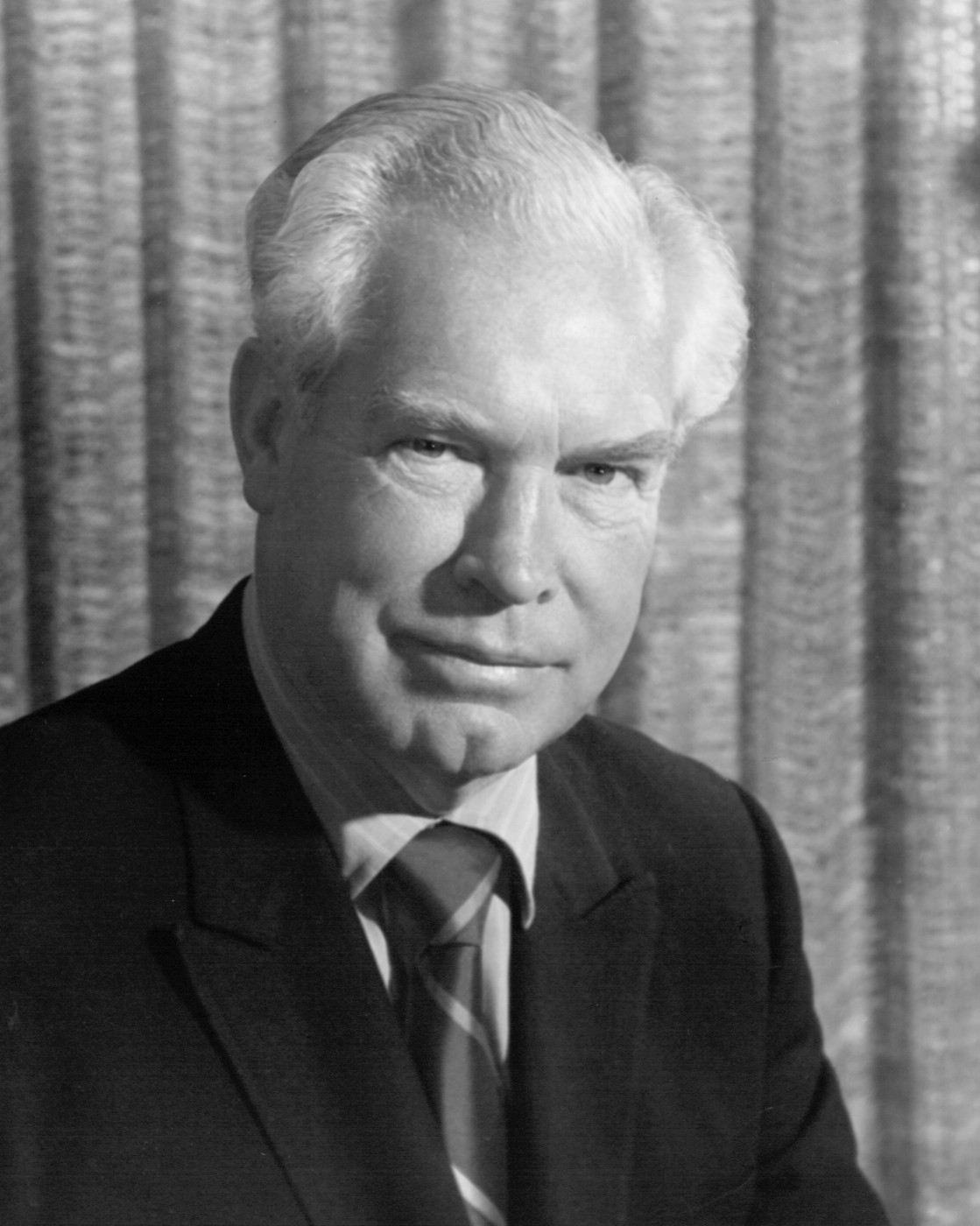
William Hanna

- July 4 – Gloria Stuart, American actress (d. 2010)
- July 9 – Govan Mbeki, South African anti-apartheid activist, politician (d. 2001)
- July 10 – Nguyễn Hữu Thọ, Vietnamese politician (d. 1996)
- July 11 – John Stapp, American U.S. Air Force officer, flight surgeon, physician and biophysicist (d. 1999)
- July 14 – William Hanna, American animator (d. 2001)
- July 17 – James Elliott Coyne, 2nd Governor of the Bank of Canada (d. 2012)
- July 18 – Mamadou Dia, 1st Prime Minister of Senegal (d. 2009)
- July 20 – Muriel Evans, American actress (d. 2000)
- July 27 – Lupita Tovar, Mexican-born American actress (d. 2016)

=== August ===
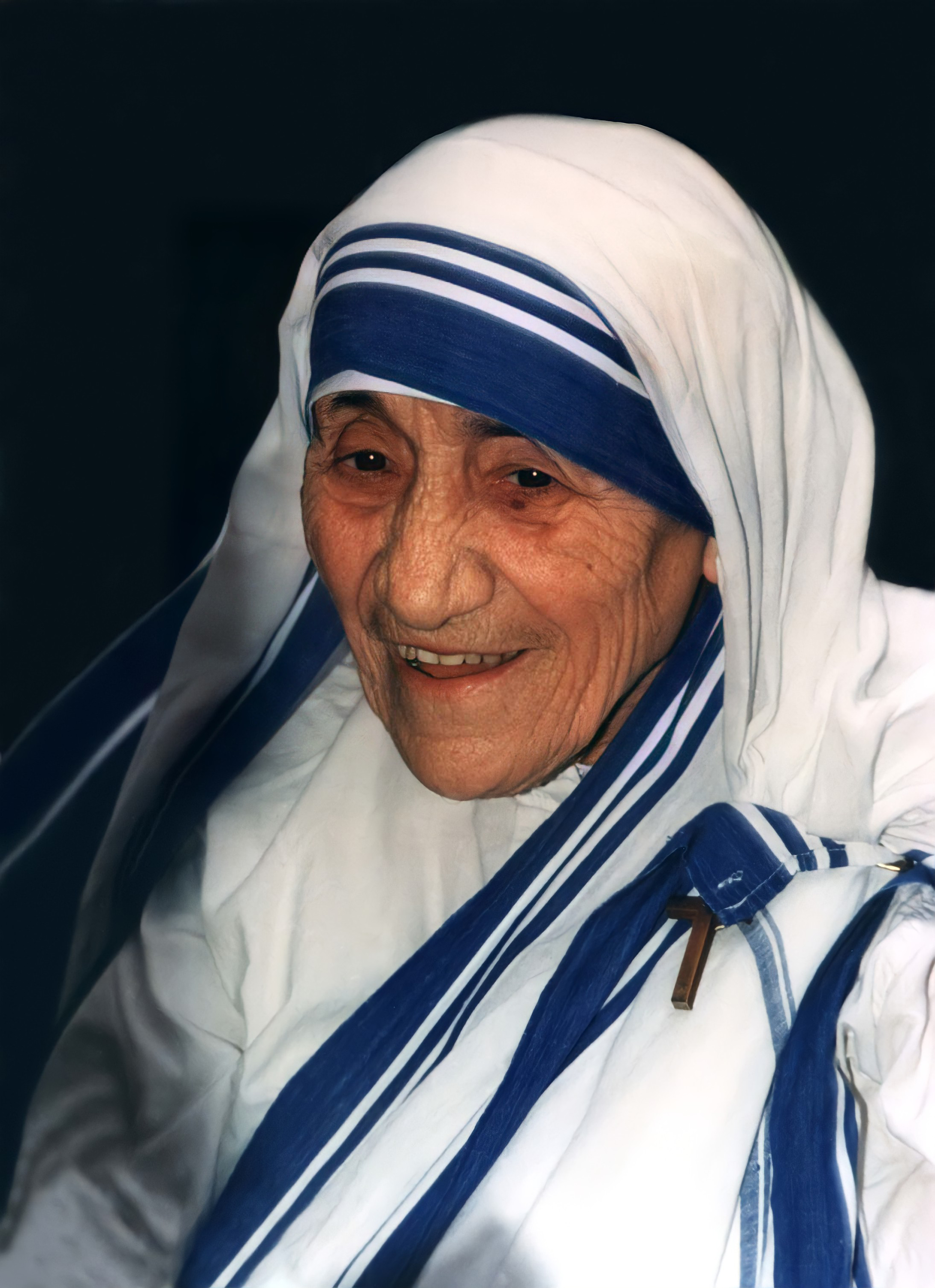
Mother Teresa

- August 4 – Anita Page, American actress (d. 2008)
- August 6 – Adoniran Barbosa, Brazilian musician, singer, composer, humorist and actor (d. 1982)
- August 7 – Lucien Hervé, Hungarian-born French photographer (d. 2007)
- August 12
  - Yusof Ishak, 1st President of Singapore (d. 1970)
  - Jane Wyatt, American actress (d. 2006)
- August 14 – Pierre Schaeffer, French composer (d. 1995)
- August 15 – Josef Klaus, 16th Chancellor of Austria (d. 2001)
- August 19 – Alphonsa of the Immaculate Conception, Indian saint (d. 1946)
- August 22 – Lucille Ricksen, American silent film actress (d. 1925)
- August 25 – Dorothea Tanning, American artist (d. 2012)
- August 26 – Mother Teresa, Macedonian-born Albanian-Indian nun, Nobel Prize laureate (d. 1997)
- August 28 – Tjalling Koopmans, Dutch economist, Nobel Prize laureate (d. 1985)

=== September ===
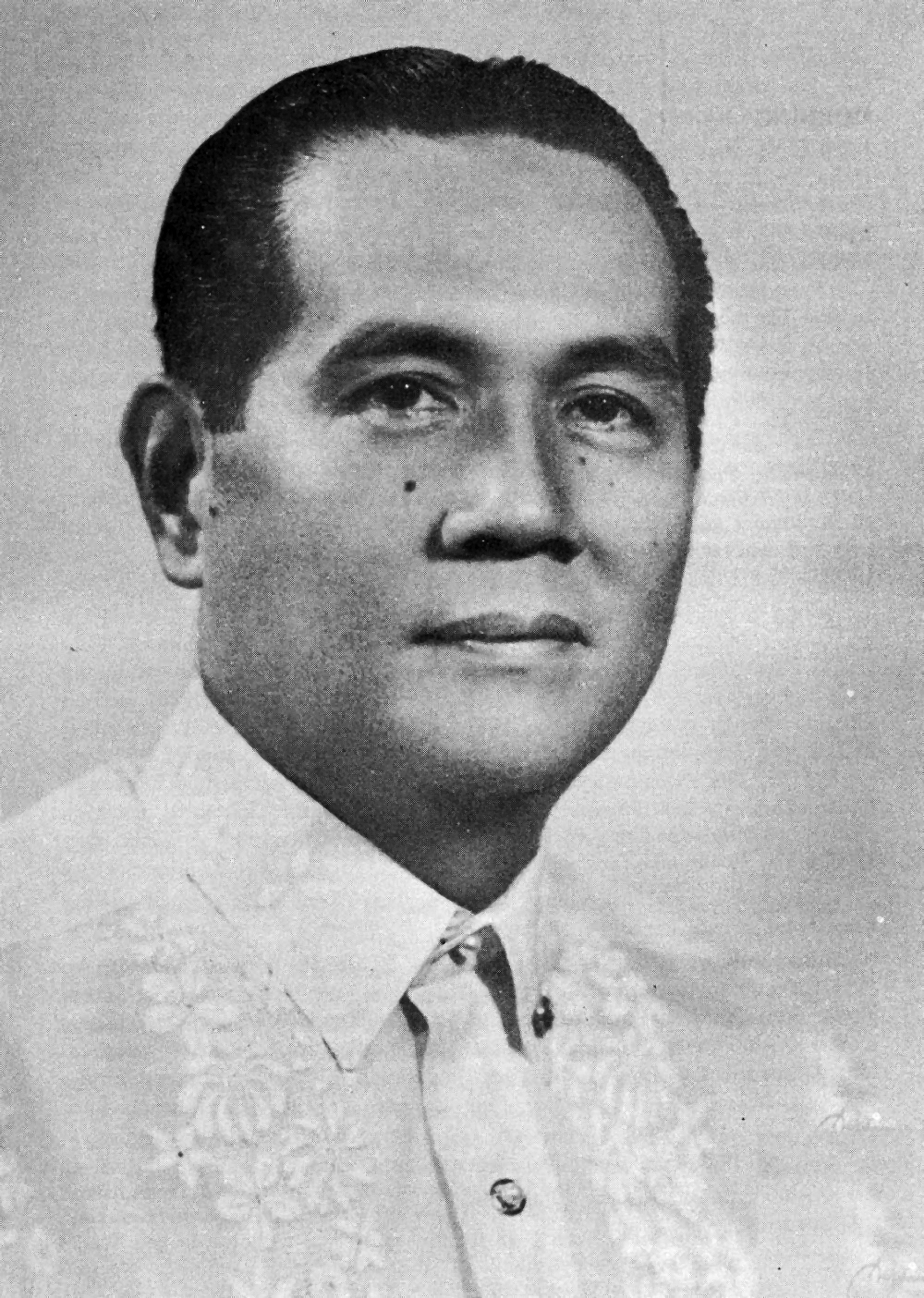
Diosdado Macapagal

- September 3 – Maurice Papon, French civil servant and collaborator (d. 2007)
- September 11 – Gerhard Schröder, German politician (d. 1989)
- September 14 – Jack Hawkins, British actor (d. 1973)
- September 16 – Erich Kempka, German chauffeur, bodyguard of Adolf Hitler (d. 1975)
- September 19 – Margaret Lindsay, American film actress (d. 1981)
- September 26 – Naomi Whitehead, American supercentenarian and the oldest living person in the United States
- September 28
  - Diosdado Macapagal, 9th President of the Philippines (d. 1997)
  - Wenceslao Vinzons, Filipino politician, resistance leader (d. 1942)
- September 29 – Virginia Bruce, American actress, singer (d. 1982)

=== October ===
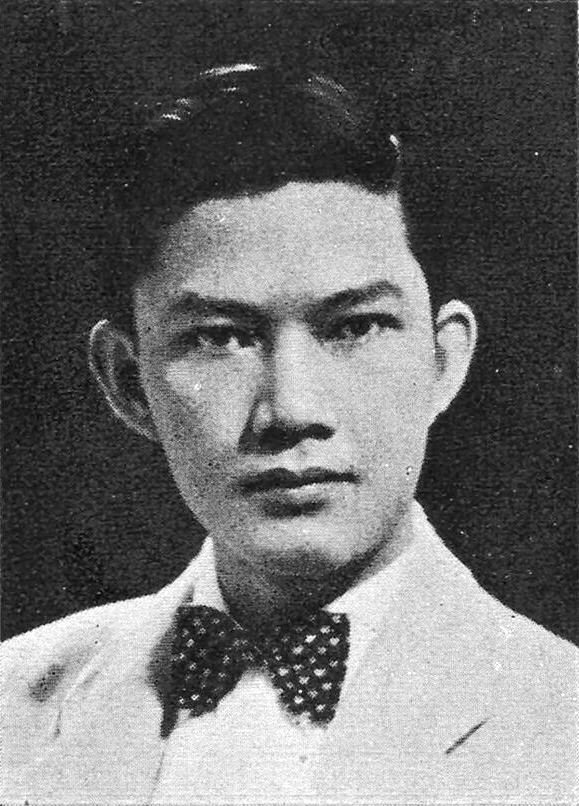
Ngô Đình Nhu

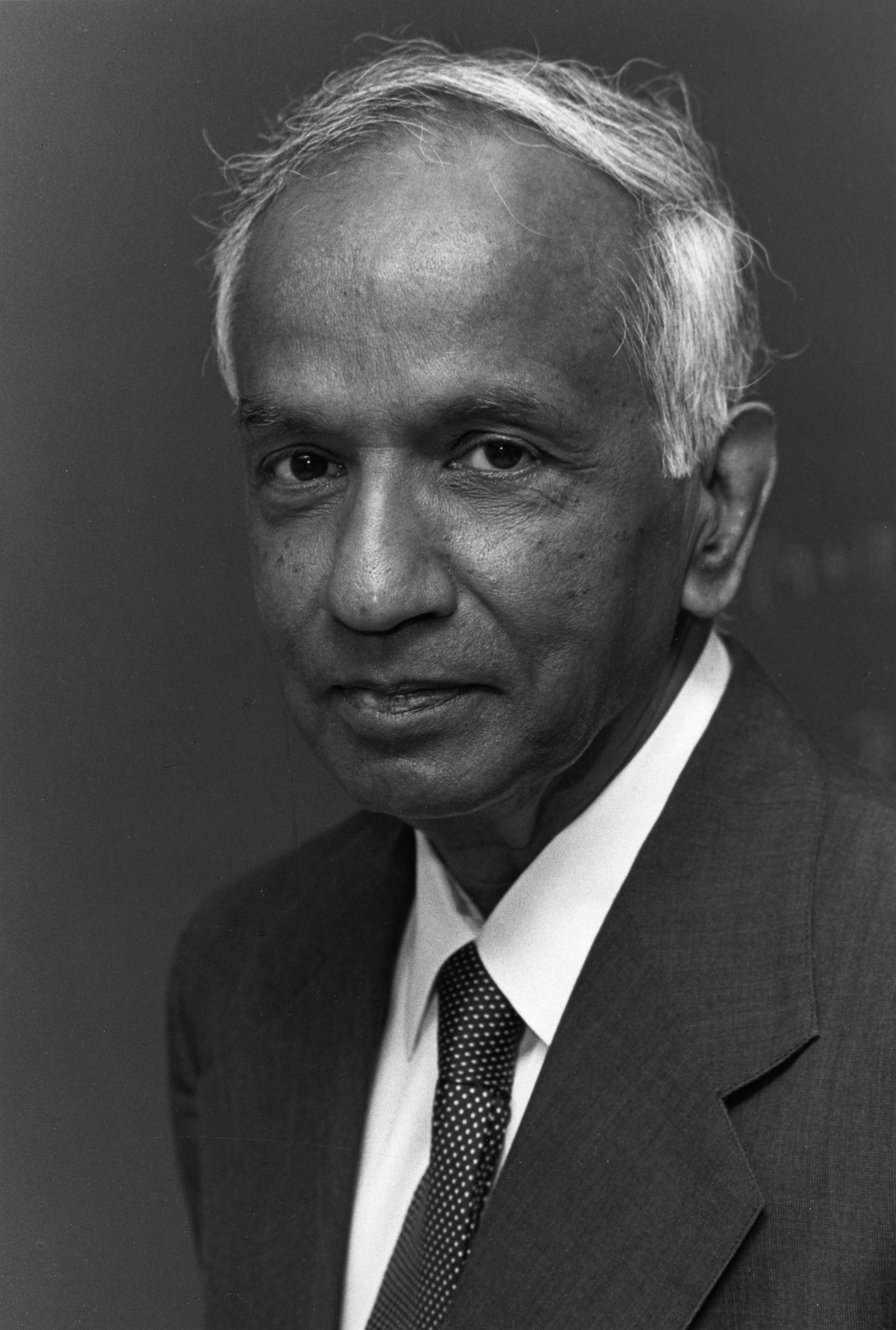
Subrahmanyan Chandrasekhar

- October 1 – Bonnie Parker, American outlaw, member of Barrow Gang (d. 1934)
- October 3
  - Sailor Malan, South African Battle of Britain fighter pilot (d. 1963)
  - Attilio Pavesi, Italian Olympic cyclist (d. 2011)
- October 7 – Ngô Đình Nhu, Vietnamese archivist and politician, State Counsellor of South Vietnam (d. 1963)
- October 8 – Gus Hall, American Communist leader (d. 2000)
- October 10 – Sir Albert Margai, 2nd Prime Minister of Sierra Leone (d. 1980)
- October 19
  - Farid al-Atrash, Arab composer, singer and actor (d. 1974)
  - Subrahmanyan Chandrasekhar, Indian-born American physicist, Nobel Prize laureate (d. 1995)
- October 22 – Bianca Tchoubar, French Ukrainian chemist specialising in reaction mechanisms (d. 1990)
- October 24 – Gunter d'Alquen, German journalist, propagandist and SS unit commander (d. 1998)
- October 25
  - Tyrus Wong, Chinese-born American artist (d. 2016)
  - David Lichine, Russian-American ballet dancer, choreographer (d. 1972)
- October 27
  - Jack Carson, Canadian-born American actor (d. 1963)
  - Herschel Daugherty, American television director (d. 1993)

=== November ===
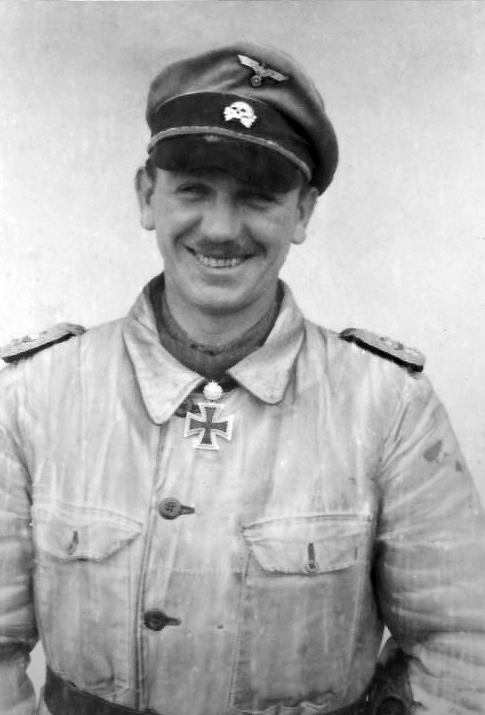
Kurt Meyer

- November 20 – Pauli Murray, African-American civil rights activist, lawyer, author and Episcopal priest (d. 1985)
- November 21 – Ibn Baz, Grand Mufti of Saudi Arabia (d. 1999)
- November 26 – Cyril Cusack, South African–born Irish actor (d. 1993)

=== December ===
- December 1
  - Dame Alicia Markova, born Lilian Marks, English ballerina (d. 2004)
  - Louis Slotin, Canadian physicist, chemist (d. 1946)
- December 4 – Ramaswamy Venkataraman, 8th President of India (d. 2009)
- December 7
  - Louis Prima, American singer-songwriter and bandleader (d. 1978)
  - Edmundo Ros, Trinidadian musician (d. 2011)
- December 15 – John Henry Hammond, American record producer (d. 1987)
- December 19 – Jean Genet, French writer (d. 1986)
- December 23
  - Princess María de las Mercedes of Bourbon-Two Sicilies (d. 2000)
  - Kurt Meyer, German Generalmajor der Waffen-SS, war criminal (d. 1961)
- December 29
  - Michel Aflaq, Syrian political theorist, founder of Ba'athism (d. 1989)
  - Ronald Coase, English-born economist, Nobel Prize laureate (d. 2013)
- December 30 – Paul Bowles, American author (d. 1999)
- December 31 – Mallikarjun Mansur, Indian classical vocalist (d. 1992)

=== Date unknown ===
- Fawzi Mulki, prime minister of Jordan (d. 1962)
- Ek Yi Oun, prime minister of Cambodia (d. 2013)

== Deaths ==
=== January ===
- January 1 – Harriet Powers, American folk artist (b. 1837)
- January 4 – Léon Delagrange, French pioneer aviator (b. 1873)
- January 5 – Léon Walras, French economist (b. 1834)
- January 12 – Bass Reeves, one of the first African-American Deputy U.S. Marshals west of the Mississippi River (b. 1838)
- January 13 – Andrew Jackson Davis, American spiritualist (b. 1826)
- January 25 – W. G. Read Mullan, American Jesuit, academic (b. 1860)
- January 27 – Thomas Crapper, British plumber (b. 1836)
- January 29 – Sir Charles Todd, Australian telegraph pioneer (b. 1826)
- January 30 – Granville Woods, African-American inventor (b. 1856)

=== February ===
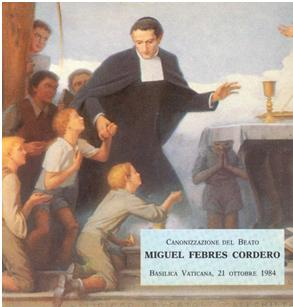
Miguel Febres Cordero

- February 6 – Alfonso Maria Fusco, Italian Roman Catholic priest, saint (b. 1839)
- February 7 – Elizabeth Martha Olmsted, American poet (b. 1825)
- February 9 – Miguel Febres Cordero, Ecuadorian Roman Catholic religious brother (b. 1854)
- February 10 – Lucy Stanton, American abolitionist (b. 1831)
- February 10 – Dirk Van Raalte, American Union soldier and politician (b. 1844)
- February 14 – Giovanni Passannante, Italian anarchist (b. 1849)
- February 20 – Boutros Ghali, Prime Minister of Egypt (assassinated) (b. 1846)
- February 23 – Vera Komissarzhevskaya, Russian actress (b. 1864)
- February 26 – Esther E. Baldwin, American missionary (b. 1840)

=== March ===
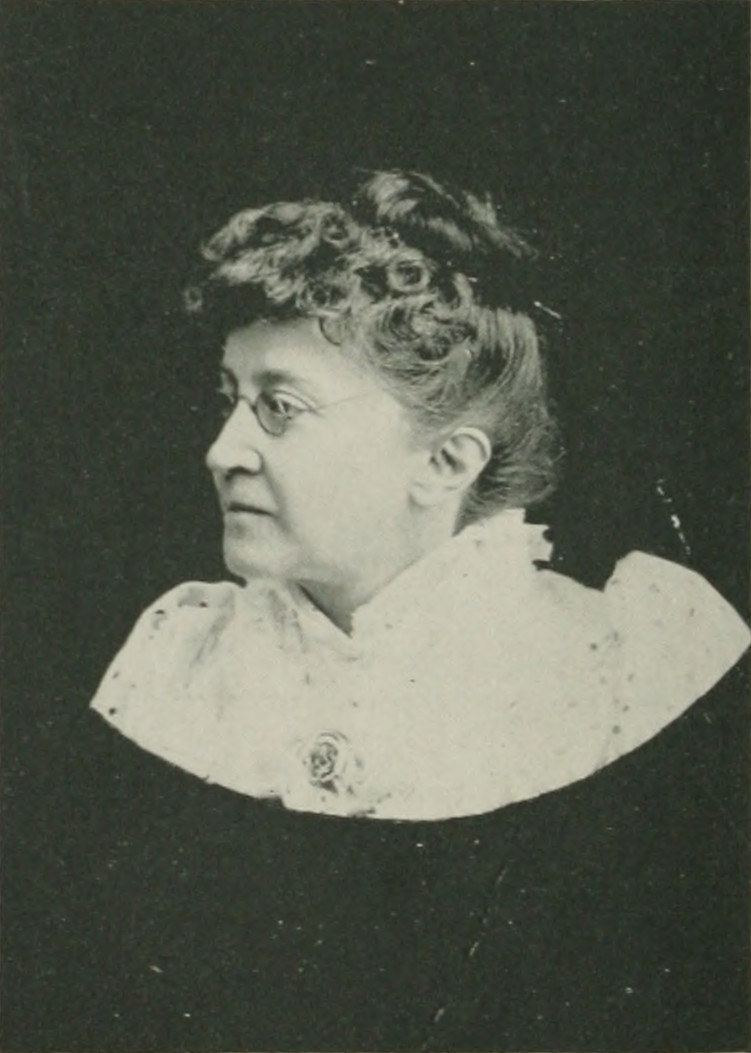
H. Maria George Colby

- March 1 – José Domingo de Obaldía, 2nd President of Panama (b. 1845)
- March 4 – Knut Ångström, Swedish physicist (b. 1857)
- March 9 – Fredrik von Otter, 8th Prime Minister of Sweden (b. 1833)
- March 10 – Karl Lueger, Austrian mayor (b. 1844)
- March 18 – Julio Herrera y Reissig, Uruguayan poet, writer (b. 1875)
- March 20 – Nadar, French photographer (b. 1820)
- March 24 – Carlo Mirabello, Italian admiral and politician (b. 1847)
- March 26 – An Jung-geun, Korean assassin (executed) (b. 1879)
- March 27 – Alexander Agassiz, American scientist (b. 1835)
- March 28 – David Josiah Brewer, American Associate Justice of the Supreme Court (b. 1837)
- March 29 – H. Maria George Colby, American fashion editor (b. 1844)
- March 30 – Jean Moréas, Greek poet, essayist and art critic (b. 1856)

=== April ===
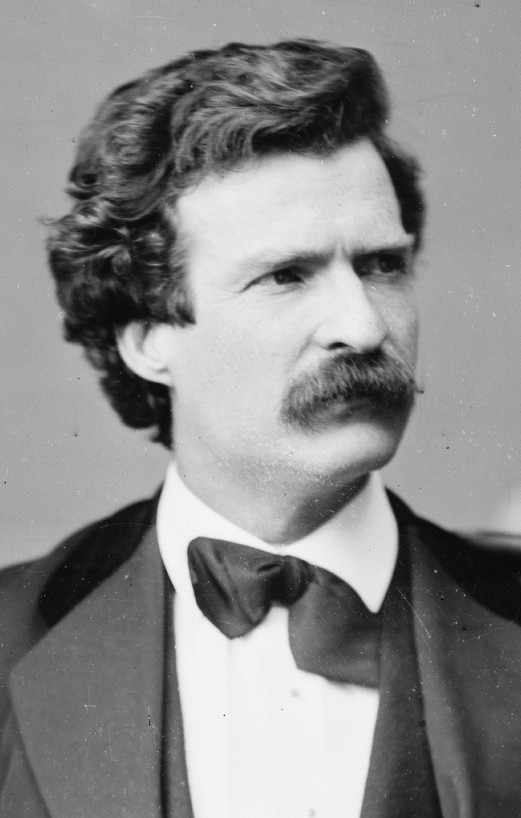
Mark Twain

- April 4 – Augusta Harvey Worthen, American educator and author (b. 1823)
- April 15 – Angelia Thurston Newman, American activist and author (b. 1837)
- April 12 – William Graham Sumner, American social scientist (b. 1840)
- April 21
  - Anne Isabella Robertson, Anglo-Irish writer and suffragist (b. circa 1830)
  - Mark Twain, American writer (b. 1835)
- April 26 – Bjørnstjerne Bjørnson, Norwegian writer, Nobel Prize laureate (b. 1832)

=== May ===
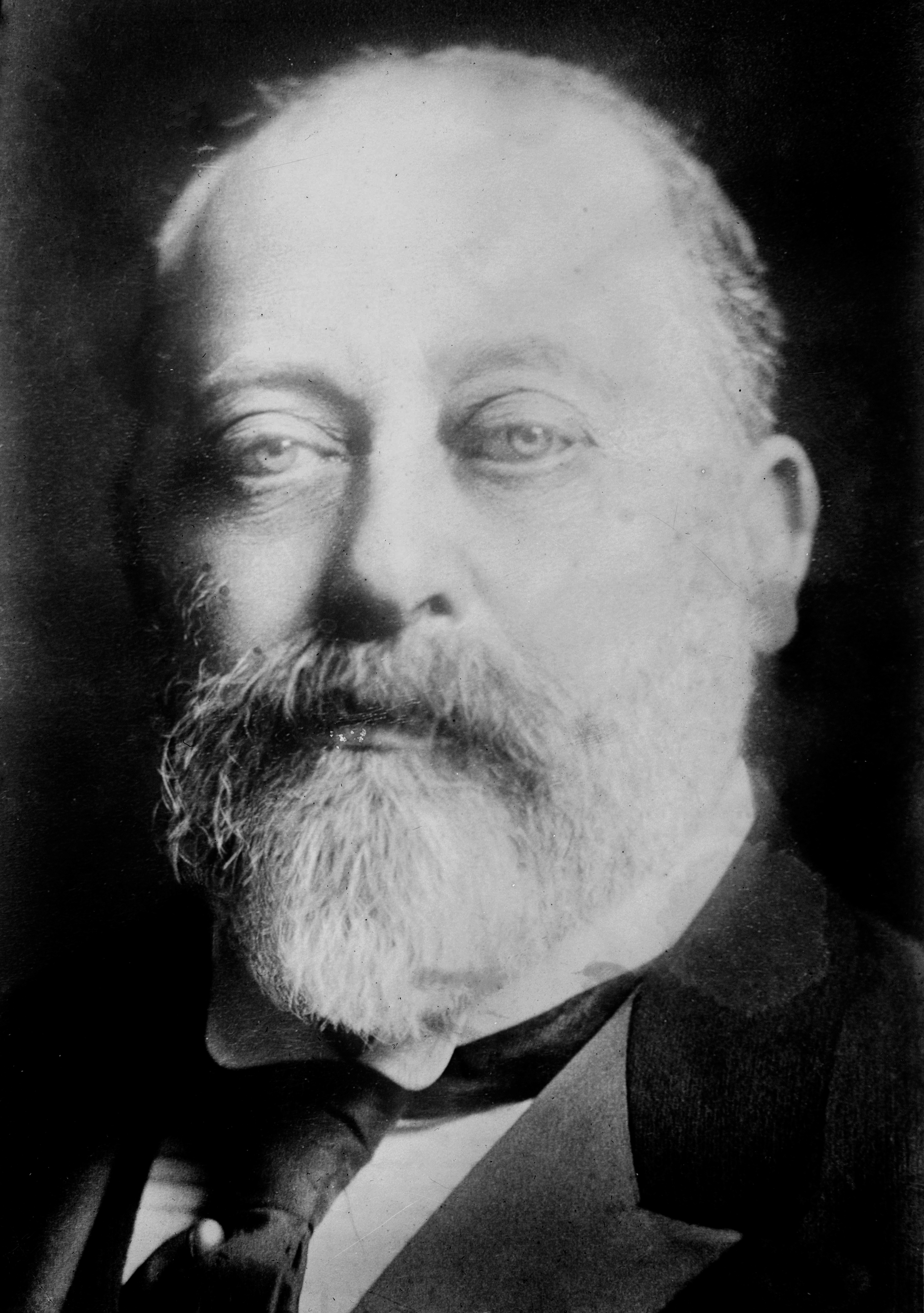
King Edward VII of the United Kingdom

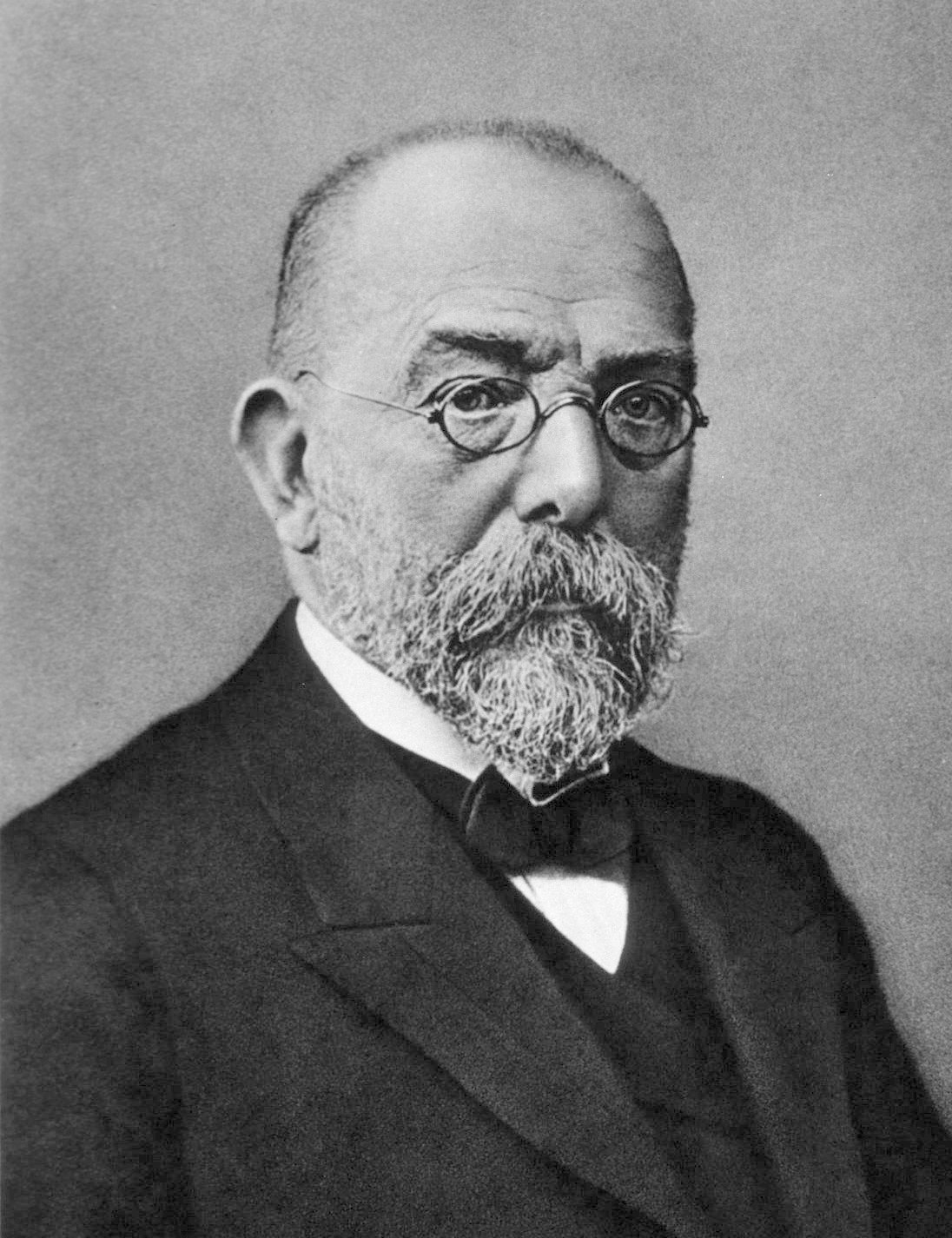
Robert Koch

- May 1 – Pierre Nord Alexis, President of Haiti (b. 1820)
- May 3 – Howard Taylor Ricketts, American pathologist (b. 1871)
- May 6 – King Edward VII of the United Kingdom (b. 1841)
- May 10 – Stanislao Cannizzaro, Italian chemist (b. 1826)
- May 12 – Sir William Huggins, British astronomer (b. 1824)
- May 18 – Pauline Viardot, French mezzo-soprano, composer (b. 1821)
- May 22 – Jules Renard, French writer (b. 1864)
- May 27 – Robert Koch, German physician, Nobel Prize laureate (b. 1843)
- May 28 – Kálmán Mikszáth, Hungarian novelist (b. 1847)
- May 29 – Mily Balakirev, Russian composer (b. 1837)
- May 31 – Elizabeth Blackwell, British-born American physician (b. 1821)

=== June ===
- June 5 – William Sydney Porter (alias O. Henry), American novelist (b. 1862)
- June 7 – Goldwin Smith, British-born Canadian historian and journalist (b. 1823)
- June 8 – Henry Granger Piffard, New York dermatologist and author of the first systematic treatise on dermatology in America (b. 1842)
- June 11 – Maria Schininà, Italian Roman Catholic religious professed (b. 1844)
- June 24 – Juan Williams Rebolledo, Chilean admiral and politician (b. 1825)

=== July ===
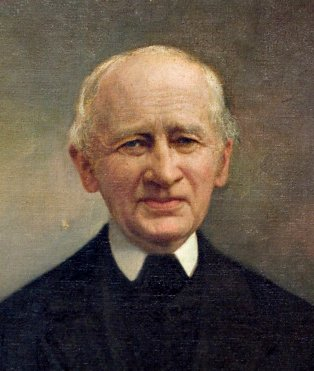
Johann Gottfried Galle

- July 1 – Max Honsell, German hydraulic engineer (b. 1843)
- July 3 – Tokugawa Akitake, Japanese daimyō, the last lord of Mito Domain, younger brother of the last shōgun Tokugawa Yoshinobu (b. 1853)
- July 4
  - Melville Fuller, American Chief Justice (b. 1833)
  - Kabua the Great, Marshallese iroijlaplap (b. c. 1820)
  - Giovanni Schiaparelli, Italian astronomer (b. 1835)
- July 10 – Johann Gottfried Galle, German astronomer (b. 1812)
- July 12 – Charles Rolls, British aviator, automobile manufacturer (b. 1877)

=== August ===
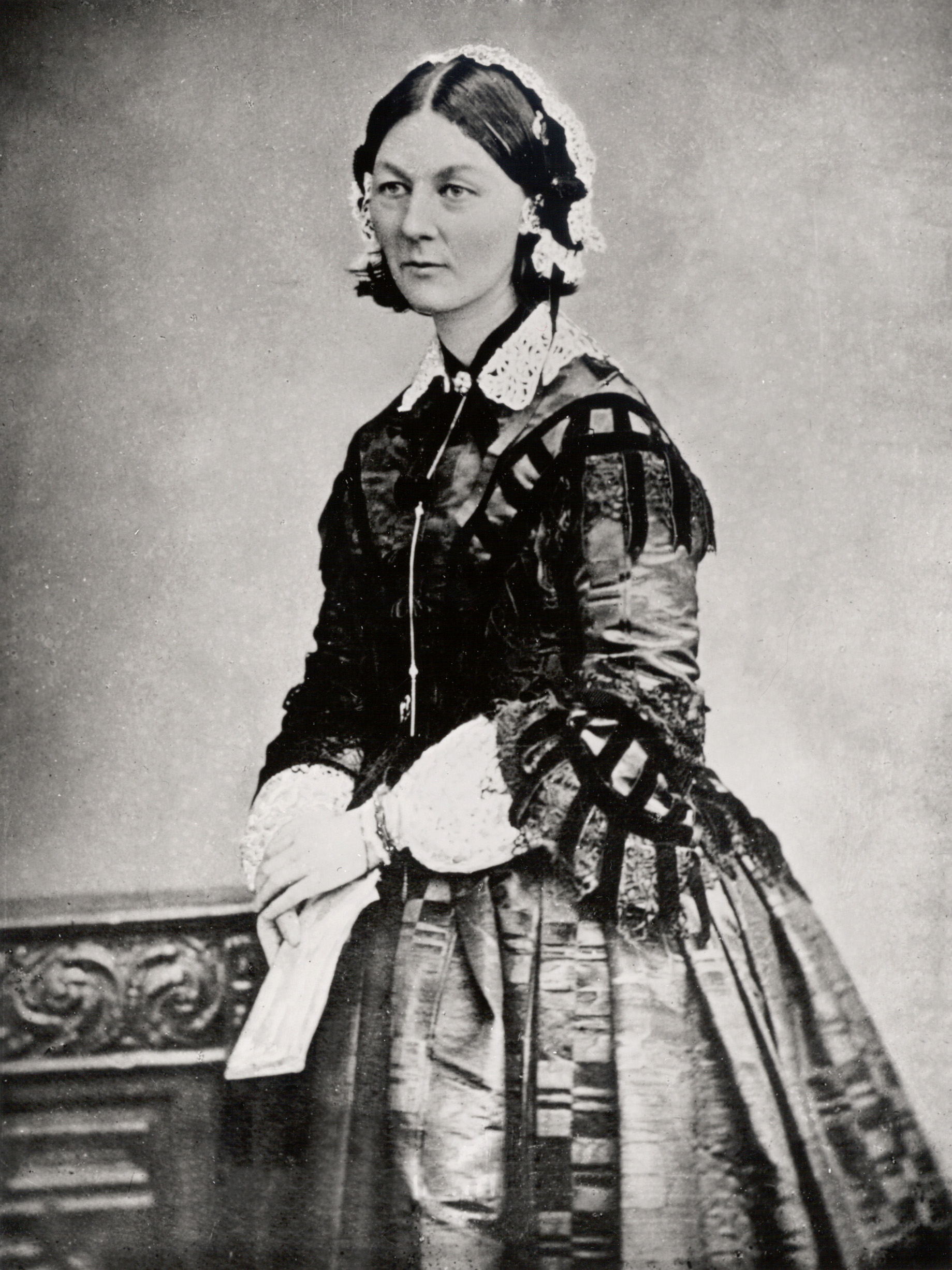
Florence Nightingale

- August 6 – Klemens Bachleda, Polish Tatra guide and mountain rescuer (b. 1851)
- August 10 – S. Isadore Miner, American journalist (b. 1863)
- August 13 – Florence Nightingale, British nurse (b. 1820)
- August 14 – Frank Podmore, British psychical researcher (b. 1856)
- August 15 – Constantin Fahlberg, Russian chemist (b. 1850)
- August 16 – Pedro Montt, 15th President of Chile (b. 1849)
- August 26
  - William James, American psychologist, philosopher (b. 1842)
  - Thomas Petrie, Australian explorer, gold prospector, logger and grazier (b. 1831)
- August 28 – Paolo Mantegazza, Italian neurologist, physiologist, anthropologist, and fiction author (b. 1831)

=== September ===
- September 1 – Alexander Mikhaylovich Zaytsev, Russian chemist (b. 1841)
- September 2 – Henri Rousseau, French painter (b. 1844)
- September 6 – Elías Fernández Albano, president of Chile (b. 1845)
- September 7
  - Emily Blackwell, American physician (b. 1826)
  - William Holman Hunt, British Pre-Raphaelite painter (b. 1827)
- September 14 – Lombe Atthill, Northern Irish obstetrician and gynaecologist (b. 1827)
- September 16 – Hormuzd Rassam, Iraqi archaeologist (b. 1826)
- September 23 – Tup Scott, Australian cricketer (b. 1858)
- September 27 – Jorge Chávez, Peruvian aviator (b. 1887)
- September 28 – Marie Pasteur, French chemist (b. 1826)
- September 29 – Winslow Homer, American painter (b. 1836)

=== October ===
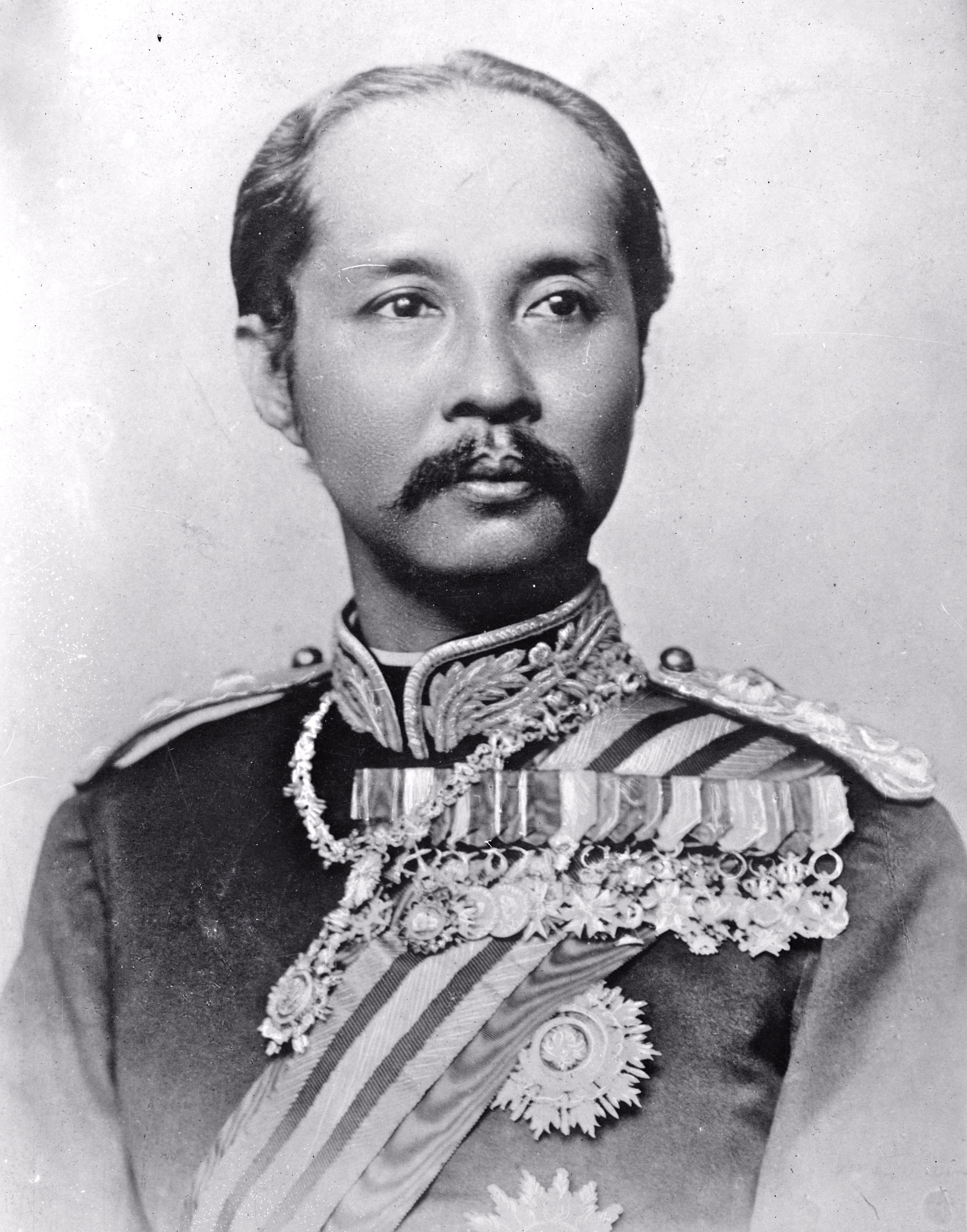
King Chulalongkorn

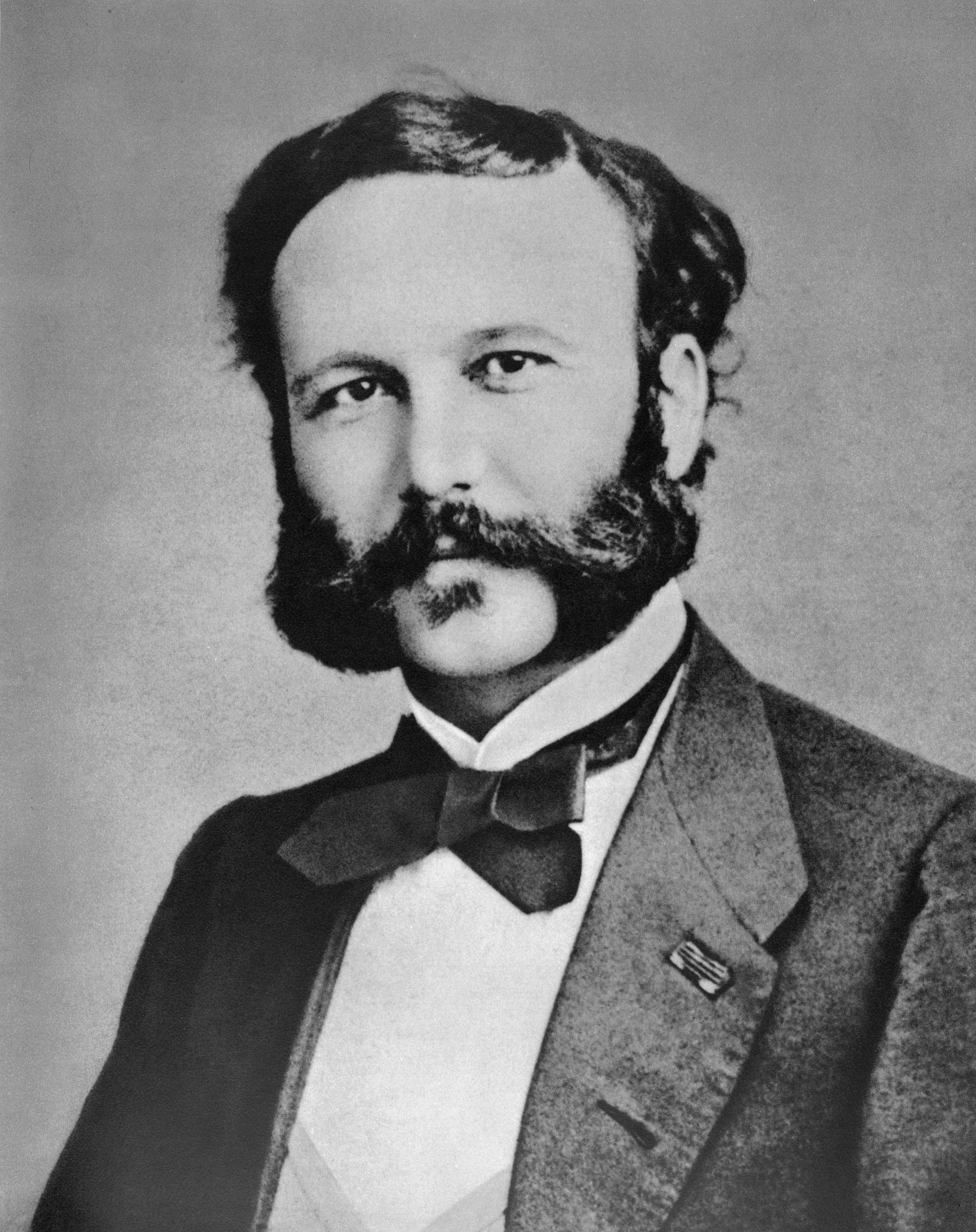
Jean Henri Dunant

- October 3 – Lucy Hobbs Taylor, American dentist (b. 1833)
- October 17
  - Carlo Michelstaedter, Italian philosopher (b. 1887)
  - Julia Ward Howe, American abolitionist, poet (b. 1819)
- October 21 – Charles van der Stappen, Belgian sculptor (b. 1843)
- October 23 – King Chulalongkorn (Rama V) of Siam (b. 1853)
- October 27 – Henrietta Gould Rowe, American litterateur (b. 1835)
- October 30 – Jean Henri Dunant, Swiss founder of the Red Cross, Nobel Prize laureate (b. 1828)

=== November ===
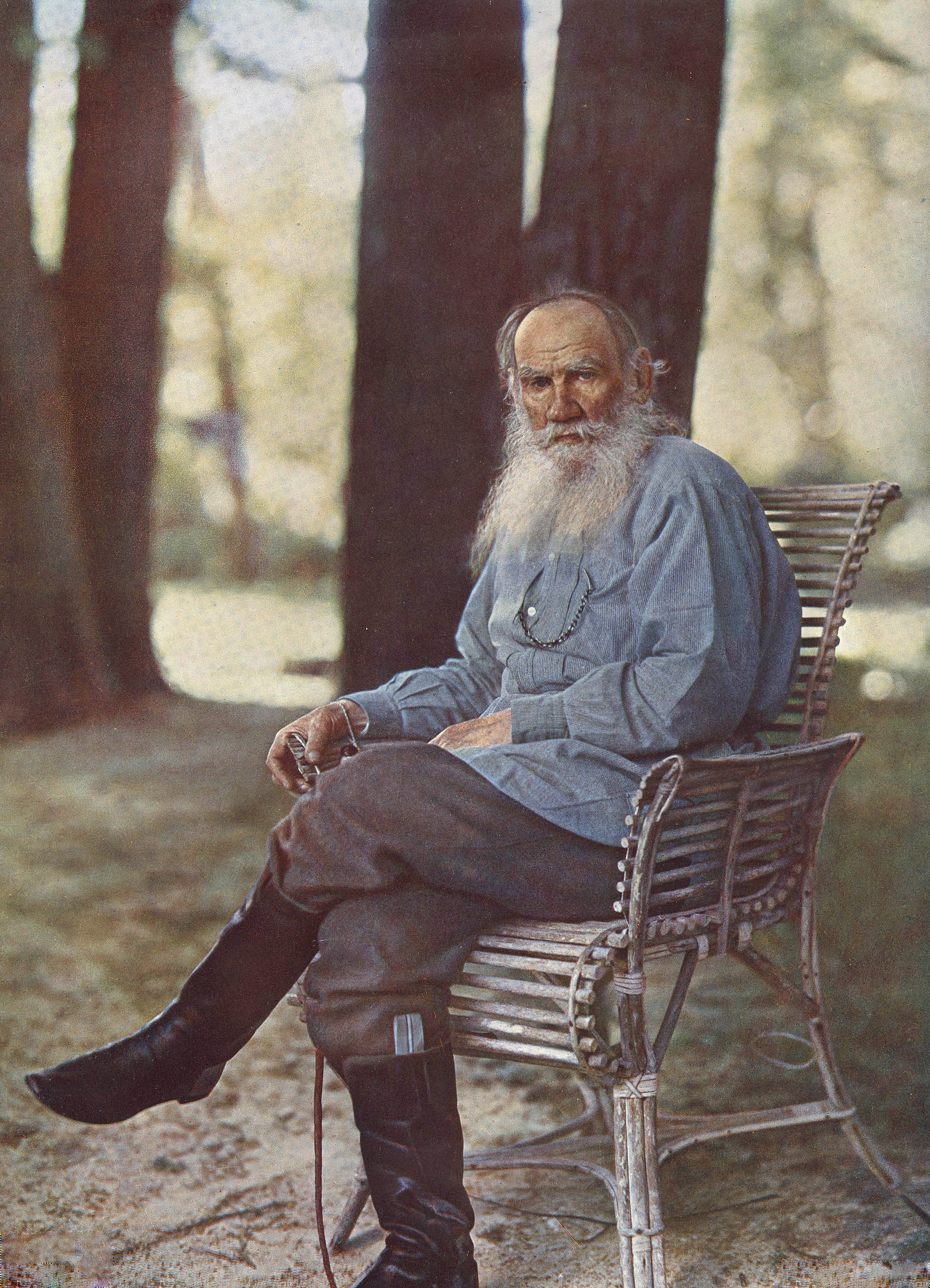
Leo Tolstoy

- November 6 – Giuseppe Cesare Abba, Italian patriot, writer (b. 1838)
- November 7 – Florencio Sánchez, Uruguayan playwright (b. 1875)
- November 13 – Isabel Grimes Richey, American poet (b. 1858)
- November 15 – Wilhelm Raabe, German writer (b. 1831)
- November 19 – Wilhelm Rudolph Fittig, German chemist (b. 1835)
- November 20 (N.S.) – Leo Tolstoy, Russian writer (b. 1828)
- November 23
  - Hawley Harvey Crippen, American murderer (executed) (b. 1862)
  - Octave Chanute, French-American engineer, aviation pioneer (b. 1832)

=== December ===
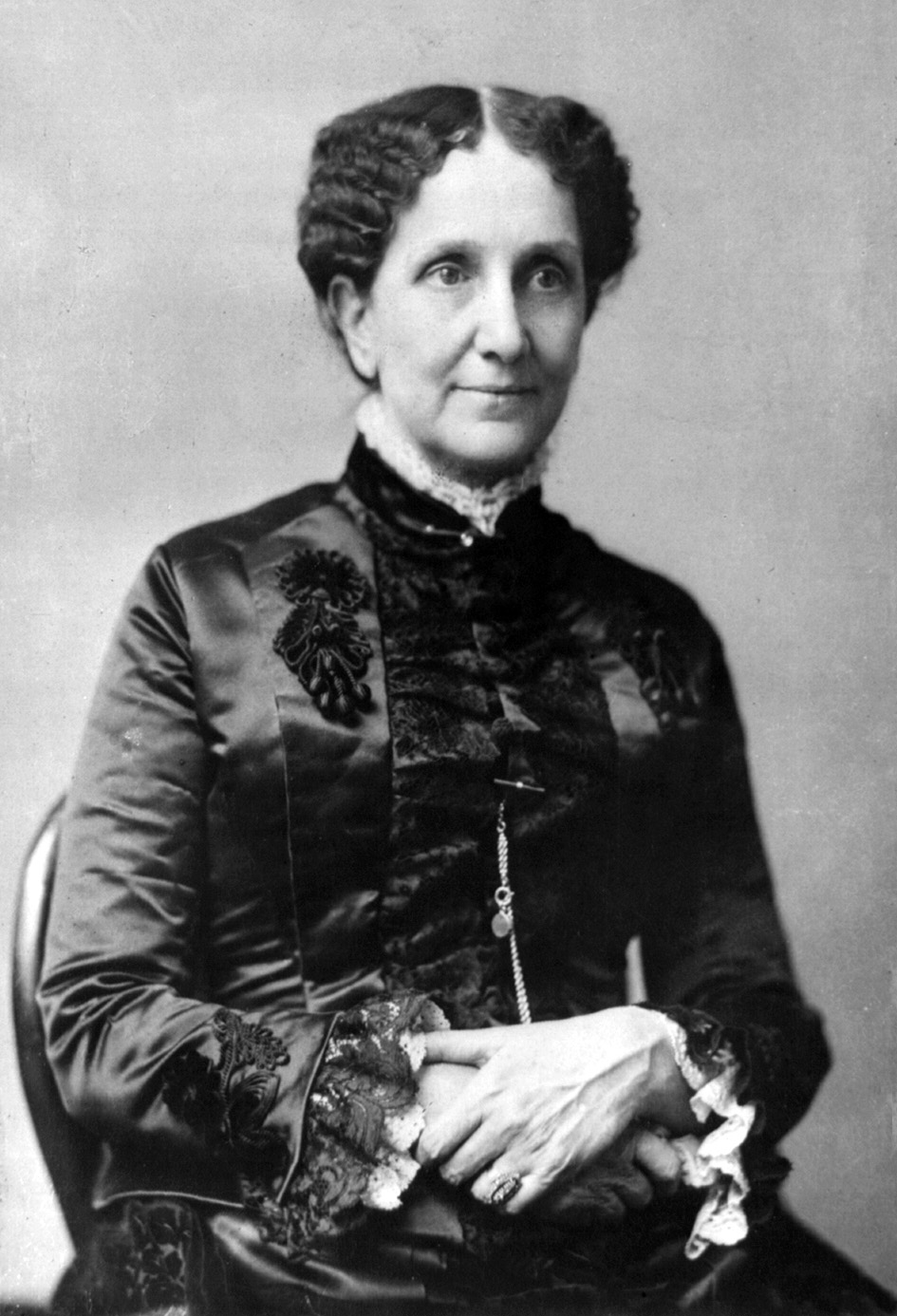
Mary Baker Eddy

- December 1 – William Pryor Letchworth, American businessman and philanthropist (b. 1823)
- December 3
  - Mary Baker Eddy, American religious leader, founder of Christian Science (b. 1821)
  - Wesley Merritt, American general (b. 1836)
- December 8 – Paškal Buconjić, Herzegovinian Catholic bishop (b. 1834)
- December 28 – Benjamin Pitman, English-born American stenographer and crafts promoter (b. 1822)
- December 29 – Reginald Doherty, British tennis player (b. 1872)
- December 31 – John Moisant, American aviator (b. 1868)

=== Date unknown ===
- Emma Bedelia Dunham, American poet and teacher (b. 1826)

== Nobel Prizes ==

- Chemistry – Otto Wallach
- Literature – Paul Heyse
- Medicine – Albrecht Kossel
- Peace – Permanent International Peace Bureau
- Physics – Johannes Diderik van der Waals
