= Max Honsell =

German hydraulic engineer

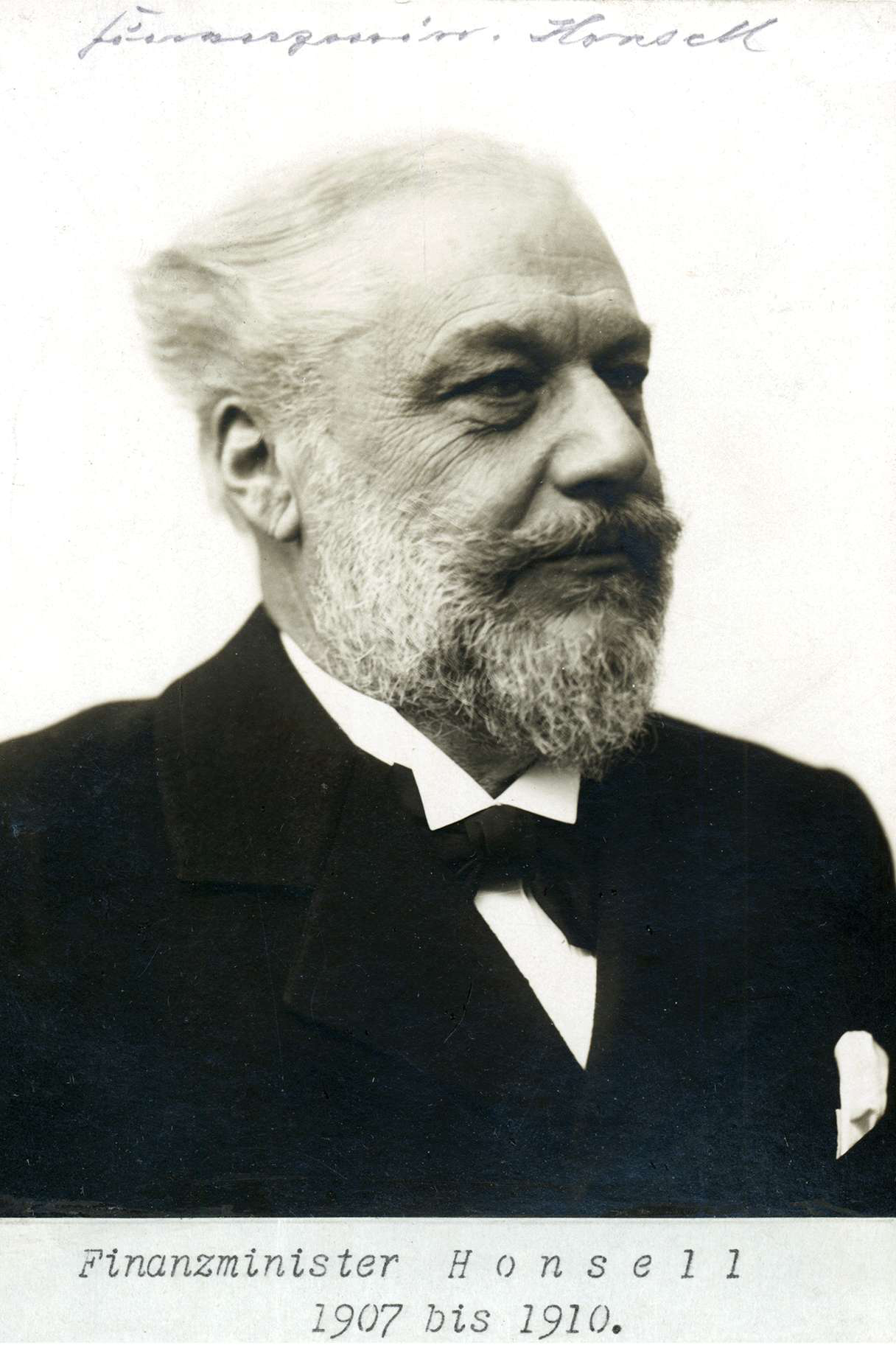
Max Honsell, Baden Minister of Finance 1906–1910

Max Honsell (10 November 1843 in Konstanz † 1 July 1910 in Karlsruhe) was a German hydraulic engineer, professor at the Technical University of Karlsruhe, and member of parliament and Minister of Finance of the Grand Duchy of Baden.

== Life ==
Max Honsell spent his childhood and youth with three brothers and a sister as the son of the court judge Carl Honsell in Constance or on weekends on the nearby Lake Constance island of Reichenau, where the family had a large house directly on the lake. His professional place of work was the Baden capital and residence city of Karlsruhe. There he died at the age of 66 as a result of a long-lasting sarcoma.

His wife, Sophie Honsell, was the daughter of Bernhard August Prestinari. The Reichenau writer Lilly Braumann-Honsell was his niece.

Members of the family were repeatedly involved in Baden politics. His father-in-law, Bernhard August Prestinari, and his uncle, Eugen von Seyfried, were already members of the Baden Assembly of Estates. His daughter Luitgard Himmelheber was involved in women's politics and was one of the first ten female representatives on the city council of Karlsruhe.

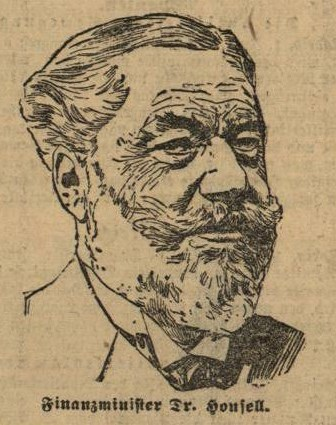
Max Honsell, from the obituary of the Badische Presse of 2 July 1910

The engineering tradition continued, not least in his grandson Max Himmelheber, who invented chipboard based on the experience of his parents' furniture factory.

== Work ==
=== Technical ===
Honsell was a graduate of the Polytechnic School of Karlsruhe. In 1865 he entered the service of the Grand Duchy of Baden Regional Directorate of Hydraulic and Road Construction and quickly took on responsibility there.

He planned and managed the construction of the Karlsruhe Rhine port and the expansion of the Mannheim port.

The correction of the Upper Rhine begun by Johann Gottfried Tulla had already been completed to a large extent, but Honsell completed it, corrected it where new challenges arose, and defended it on the basis of scientific investigations.

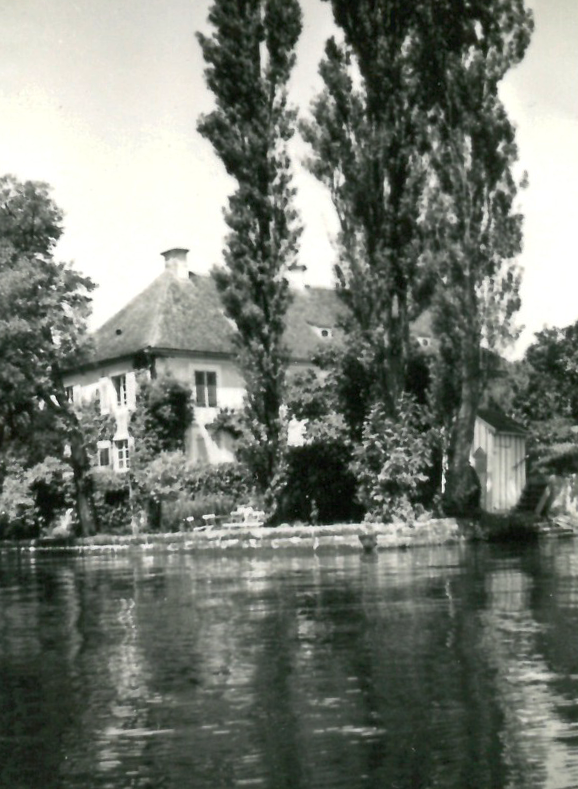
House of the Honsell family, Reichenau Island, ca. 1940

One of his most significant hydraulic engineering contributions was to make the Upper Rhine navigable from Mannheim upwards to Strasbourg, for which he drew up the planning in which he designed a low-water fairway. He did not live to see the completion of the execution of Honsell's Rhine regulation, which had begun in 1907. The first tugboats operated from 1913. For a long time, Honsell had to hold back ex officio on the question of cargo shipping above the terminus in Mannheim, Baden. It was only with the appearance of a plan for a canal on the left bank of the Rhine on the Alsatian side at the 3rd Maritime Congress in 1888 in Frankfurt am Main that the Grand Duke was convinced that navigation on a regulated Rhine—in which Baden could then also participate—was always better than a canal that led past Baden. With the regulation of the Rhine, Baden prevailed over the canal projects. Honsell provided the technical justification for this in an essay spread over several consecutive issues in the renowned journal Central Gazette of the Building Administration, among others. After the First World War, France enforced the total use of the Rhine for itself via the Treaty of Versailles in 1919 and built the Rhine Lateral Canal from 1928 onwards, which later led to significant environmental impacts.

All structural measures were checked by Honsell for their economic benefit and, if this was not recognizable, rejected.

From 1886 onwards, he set up systematic water level monitoring and improved the flood news service on the Rhine.

=== Organizational ===
In addition to his professional authority, which was quickly recognized internationally, he possessed a high degree of organizational skill and assertiveness. For example, he reorganized Baden's waterways' administration and supervision by separating them from road construction, at least for Baden's main waterway, the Rhine, and concentrating them on three Rhine construction inspections. After the devastating flood disasters of 1882 and 1883, Honsell seized the opportunity and, in 1883, pushed through the founding of the Central Office for Meteorology and Hydrography and took over its management.

=== Scientific ===
The Baden office was the leading office in the field of hydraulic engineering in Germany. On 9 March 1883, the Reichstag decided to set up a Reich Commission to investigate the current conditions of the Rhine and its most important tributaries, in which Honsell and his scientific assistant Maximilian von Tein did the main work. The results of the study were published in eight "booklets" (in fact, some of them multi-volume books). This work is still of fundamental importance today in terms of flood events and flood protection in the 19th century in this area. With regard to the Rhine, another important step was not taken until the 1970s by the "Flood Study Commission for the Rhine."

In 1883 he was appointed an extraordinary member of the Prussian Academy of Civil Engineering by Emperor Wilhelm I.

From 1887 until he took over the Ministry of Finance, he was professor of hydraulic engineering at the Technical University of Karlsruhe. In recognition of his scientific achievements, the Technical University of Karlsruhe awarded him an honorary doctorate in November 1906.

With the study of Lake Constance and the lowering of its flood levels in 1879, Honsell proposed one of at least nine projects to date (2017) for the regulation of Lake Constance. None of them has ever been carried out because the interests of the many residents involved are apparently too different, and in the meantime, the fear of irreparable damage has probably become too great. The topic tends to resurface during major flood events, most recently in 1999.

Throughout Europe, Honsell was considered a proven expert in river engineering and inland shipping. For this reason, he was often appointed as an expert in commissions throughout the German-speaking world: Austria, Switzerland, Württemberg, the two Hessians, Cologne, and others. He declined a call to the Vienna Technical University (1891) and one to the Technical University in Munich (1896).

Already in his first years of work, still as a simple engineer at the Mannheim Inspectorate, he translated and published the article by the French hydraulic engineer Louis Fargue, which won a prize in France during the years of the Franco-German War in 1871, from whom he had learned a great deal for his future work during a five-month study visit in 1869.

=== Political ===
On May 1, 1902, Max Honsell gave the ceremonial lecture to celebrate the 50th anniversary of the reign of Grand Duke Friedrich in his presence in the auditorium of the Technical University of Karlsruhe. In addition to the obvious personal appreciation for Max Honsell, the lecture also showed the great importance Frederick I attached to technical development by making the university a center of his reign anniversary.

From 1903 to 1906, Honsell was a member of the First Chamber of Baden appointed by the Grand Duke, and as a commission, he elected the Budget Commission for himself. However, he never belonged to a political party.

In October 1906, the Grand Duke appointed him Baden's Minister of Finance. He was the first engineer to hold this post, which he held until his death.

=== Scientific policy advice ===
The scientific justification of the Rhine flood of 1882/1883 as a result of exceptionally high precipitation, which the member of parliament Georg Thilenius illustrated in the German Reichstag using diagrams from Max Honsell's book Flood Catastrophes, is considered an early example of scientific policy advice in Germany.

=== Public perception: A "Honselle" ===
As finance minister, Max Honsell made few friends. His term of office was initially marked by declining government revenues and exploding government spending. Baden had been particularly involved in the field of railways beyond its means. His task as finance minister was to restructure the state treasury—which is why he has also been called the "savings minister." The officials were annoyed by the cancellation of some privileges. On 1 January 1909, the law concerning the costs of business trips and removals of civil servants came into force. According to this, daily rates for business trips were no longer granted as a lump sum, but graded according to the actual duration of "the foreign business (including the necessary rest breaks and any waiting times for the departure of the train)". In ⁣⁣Daxlanden⁣⁣, the local history says, the angry officials soon discovered that if they extended a business trip a little by taking a break in the inn, they could pay for their consumption with the difference in the graduated daily allowance. The "Viertele" enjoyed on this occasion thus became the "Honselle."

== Honors ==
Above all, but not only, for his services as a hydraulic engineer, he was awarded medals by many European institutions.

- Knight's Cross First Class of the Order of the Württemberg Crown (10 November 1881)
- Commander's Cross Second Class of the Württemberg Order of Frederick on 7 November 1888
- Prussian Order of the Red Eagle Second Class (13 September 1893)
- Second class with star of the Bavarian Order of Merit of St. Michael on 10 June 1894
- Commander's Cross with Star of the Austro-Hungarian Order of Franz Joseph on 1 August 1897
- Baden Grand Cross of the Order of the Zähringer Lion on 21 December 1907
- Prussian Order of the Crown First Class (12 May 1908)
- Grand Cross of the Grand Ducal Order of Merit of Hesse (6 June 1908)
- Grand Cross of the Saxon Order of Albrecht on 31 March 1909

A road, a bridge and also a measuring ship are named after him in Karlsruhe, which sails the Rhine and the Neckar to monitor the water quality. Frankfurt am Main named both Honsellstraße and Honsellbrücke after Max Honsell. In addition, Rastatt and Kehl each have a Honsellstraße.

== Bibliography ==
- Fuchs, Rudolf (1912). Max Honsell. G. Graunsche Hofbuchdruckerei und Verlag.
- Bleines, Walter (1972). "Honsell, Max". Neue Deutsche Biographie. Vol. 9. Berlin: Duncker & Humblot. pp. 602–603. ISBN 3-428-00190-7.
