= Maria Schininà =

Italian Roman Catholic nun

Blessed Maria Schininà
- Born: 10 April 1844; Ragusa, Kingdom of the Two Sicilies
- Died: 11 June 1910 (aged 66); Ragusa, Kingdom of Italy
- Venerated in: Roman Catholic Church
- Beatified: 4 November 1990, Saint Peter's Square, Vatican City by Pope John Paul II
- Feast: 11 June
- Attributes: Religious habit
- Patronage: Sisters of the Sacred Heart of Jesus

Maria Schininà (10 April 1844 – 11 June 1910), also known by her religious name Maria of the Sacred Heart of Jesus, was an Italian Roman Catholic nun and the founder of the Sisters of the Sacred Heart of Jesus (1889). Her adolescence demonstrated no particular spiritual emphasis though the death of her father and the marriage of her brother prompted a sudden inner conversion that saw her reach out and collaborate with the ill and the poor; she began in 1885 the foundations for what would become the religious congregation that she set up in 1889.

Her beatification cause started in 1975 and culminated in the formal beatification that occurred on 4 November 1990.

== Life ==
Maria Schininà was born on 10 April 1844 in Ragusa to the nobles Giambattista Schininà and Rosalia Arezzo as the fifth of eight children. Her baptism was celebrated in the local parish church in that same month. Her childhood or adolescence did not demonstrate particular inclinations to faith or religion. The priest Vincenzo Di Stefano oversaw her initial education until she turned 21.

Her father died in 1865 and it prompted a radical inner change to alter her own life and the 1874 marriage of the final child - a brother - prompted her to take care of her mother and to dedicate her life to the outcast as well as to the sick and the poor; she removed all of her elegant clothes and dressed like the poor while giving her clothes to the poor. Her mother later died in 1884. In 1877 the Carmelite Salvatore La Perla chose her to act as the directress of the new Pia Unione delle Figlie di Maria - she had joined it in 1875 - and attracted people to the union while wanting to lead a "true social revolution" in the light of the Gospel and its teachings while later deciding in 1885 to found a religious order upon the advice of the Franciscan Archbishop of Siracusa Benedetto La Vecchia. That same archbishop heard her and five others make their solemn profession on 9 May 1889 as soon as the order - the Sisters of the Sacred Heart of Jesus - was established. Schininà met and received a blessing from Pope Leo XIII in Rome in a private audience that happened in 1890 and the pope hailed the work that she was doing. In 1908 she tended to those that the Messina earthquake had affected.

Schininà died on 11 June 1910. Her order received the decree of praise from Pope Pius XI on 27 November 1936 and later full papal approval from Pope Pius XII a decade later on 11 March 1946. The order was later aggregated to the Order of Friars Minor Conventual on 9 February 1955 and in 2005 had 533 religious in 59 houses in locations such as Poland and Canada.

== Beatification ==
Schininà's spiritual writings were approved by theologians on 2 January 1949. The beatification process opened in two informative processes in which one had run in Ragusa from 2 April 1937 until 1945 while the second opened a decade later in 1956 and closed in 1957; the Congregation for the Causes of Saints later validated these processes over two decades later on 25 November 1983. The formal introduction to the cause came under Pope Paul VI on 16 January 1975 in which she was titled as a Servant of God. The C.C.S. received the Positio and passed it to theologians who assented to its contents on 13 December 1988 with the C.C.S. following on 21 March 1989. Pope John Paul II confirmed her heroic virtue and named her as Venerable on 13 May 1989.

The process for a miracle spanned from 5 March 1981 until 11 January 1982 and received C.C.S. validation on 17 December 1983; a medical board confirmed it as a miracle on 25 October 1989 as did theologians on 2 February 1990 and the C.C.S. on 13 March 1990. John Paul II approved it on 9 April 1990 and beatified the late nun on 4 November 1990.

The current postulator for this cause is Sr. Concetta Aranzulla.
