= Anne Isabella Robertson =

Irish writer and suffragist

- Born: Anne Isabella Robertson c. 1830
- Died: 21 April 1910; Dublin

Anne Isabella Robertson (c. 1830 – 21 April 1910) was a writer and leading suffragist in Ireland.

== Life ==
Born Anne Isabella Robertson in about 1830 to Major Archibald Robertson. Her father was president of the African Institute, established in Paris for the suppression of slavery. She was one of the women who presented a petition on Women's suffrage in 1868 along with her sister. Robertson led the Irish campaign for the next few years. She spoke at Manchester and Birmingham meetings. She was the President of the Irish National Society for Women's Suffrage in 1871 as well as secretary of the Dublin Branch of the Women's suffrage society. Before that she had written novels on politics and religious life in Ireland as well as discussing women's employment. Robertson was active in Lydia Becker's Married Women's Property campaign. She spoke eloquently on women's suffrage and she travelled to Edinburgh in 1873 to meet Eliza Wigham and the Edinburgh National Society for Women's Suffrage. She was well regarded in this field and the John Stuart Mill's London Suffrage Society ordered 1,000 copies of her essay "Women's Needs to be Represented" to be distributed. Robertson is considered one of Ireland's first suffragists. She lived with her sister and mother in Sandymount, Dublin. Both predeceased her.

== Writings ==
- Myself and My Relatives: A Story Of Home Life (1863) OCLC 56711339
- A Tipperary Shot in Once A Week, vol 11, October 15 (1864) OCLC 191223193
- Yaxley and Its Neighborhood: A Novel In Three Volumes (1865) OCLC 266328320
- The Story of Nelly Dillon, 2vols. (1866) OCLC 558532551
