= Börsenstraße 2–4 =

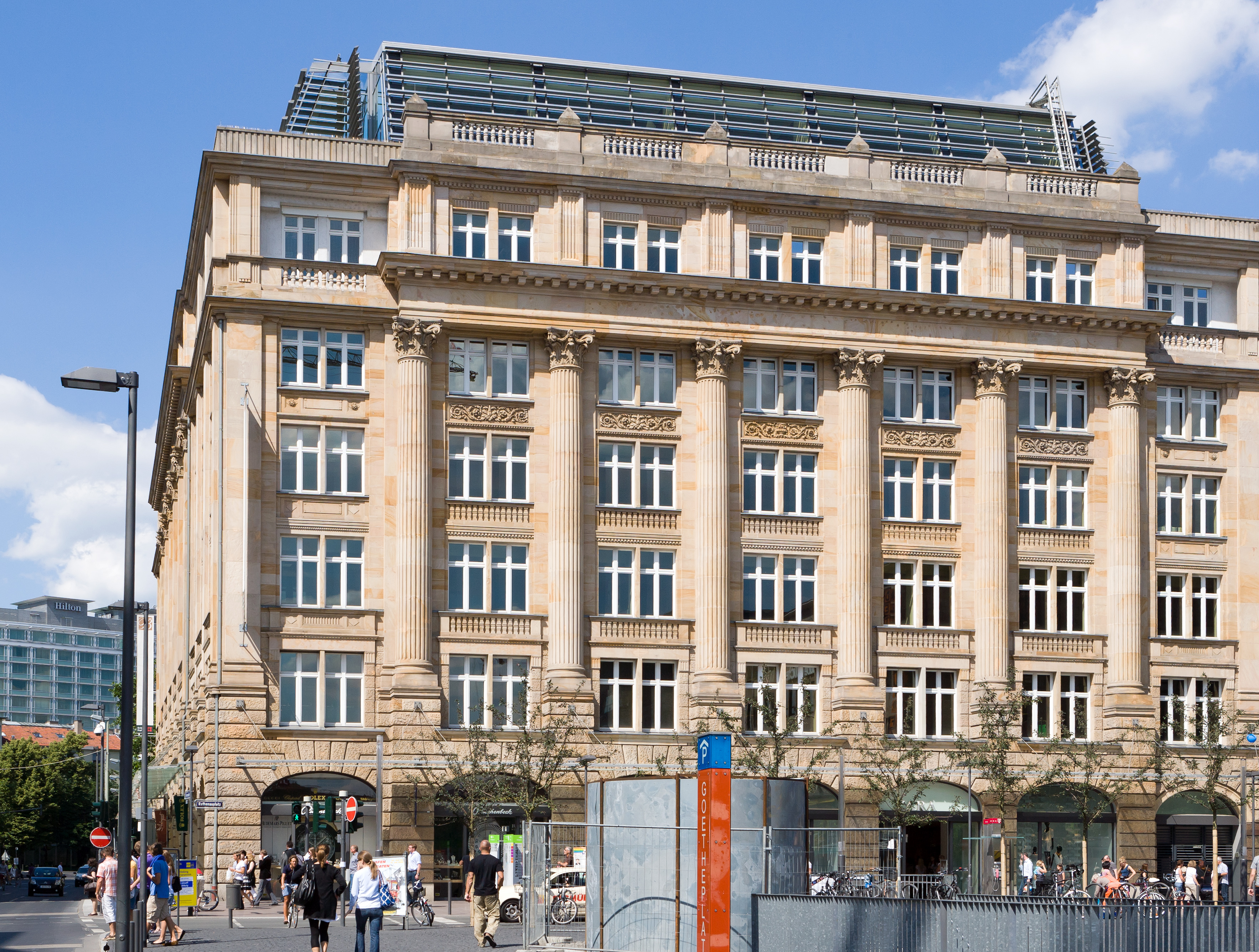
- Interactive map of the Börsenstraße 2–4 area

General information
- Architectural style: Neoclassical
- Coordinates: 50.114512°N 8.677012°E
- Completed: 1913

Height
- Height: 30 m (98 ft)

Technical details
- Floor area: 12,736 m^{2} (137,090 sq ft)

Börsenstraße 2–4 is an 8-story low-rise neoclassical building in Frankfurt, Germany. It directly faces the Börsenstraße (Stock Exchange Street) and the Freßgass to the west, the Börsenplatz (Stock Exchange Square) and the Frankfurt Stock Exchange to the north, and the Biebergasse and the Rathenauplatz to the south. The Hauptwache is located fifty metres down the Biebergasse in the eastern direction. It thus occupies a highly central position in the Frankfurt central city district.

The building was completed in 1913, and was built for the lace and tulle merchant Sigmund Strauss and designed by the architects Wilhelm Schmitt and Hermann Ritter. It is a listed cultural heritage site. The interior of the building was renovated in 1995. The building is owned by Commerzbank and its main tenants are international financial institutions, particularly the German branch of the investment bank N M Rothschild & Sons. The ground floor is occupied by a Zara store and smaller upmarket stores. Until the early 2000s, the main tenant was the German office of JPMorgan. Börsenstraße 2–4 was formerly also the seat of the Frankfurt Oberjustizkasse and of the Frankfurter Allgemeine Zeitung newspaper until 1961. It was also the seat of the Bizonal Economic Council, the first de facto West German parliament and the immediate predecessor of the Bundestag.

== Tenants ==
- N M Rothschild & Sons (current)
- JPMorgan (former)
- Frankfurter Allgemeine Zeitung (former)
- Frankfurt Oberjustizkasse (former)
- Bizonal Economic Council (former)
- Kunstsalon Ludwig Schames (former)
