= Bizone =

Joint occupied zone in western Germany

Bizone Bizonia (1947–1948) Trizone (1948–1949) Trizonesien
- 1947–1949
- Flag
- Anthem: Trizonesien-Song (unofficial)
- Occupation zones of Germany, with the beige areas out of joint Allied control (the former eastern territories of Germany according to the joint British, Soviet and US Potsdam Agreement of 1945 and the formerly western German Saar, following a French and US decision of 1946) and the state Free Hanseatic City of Bremen (established as a US exclave within the British zone as of early 1947)

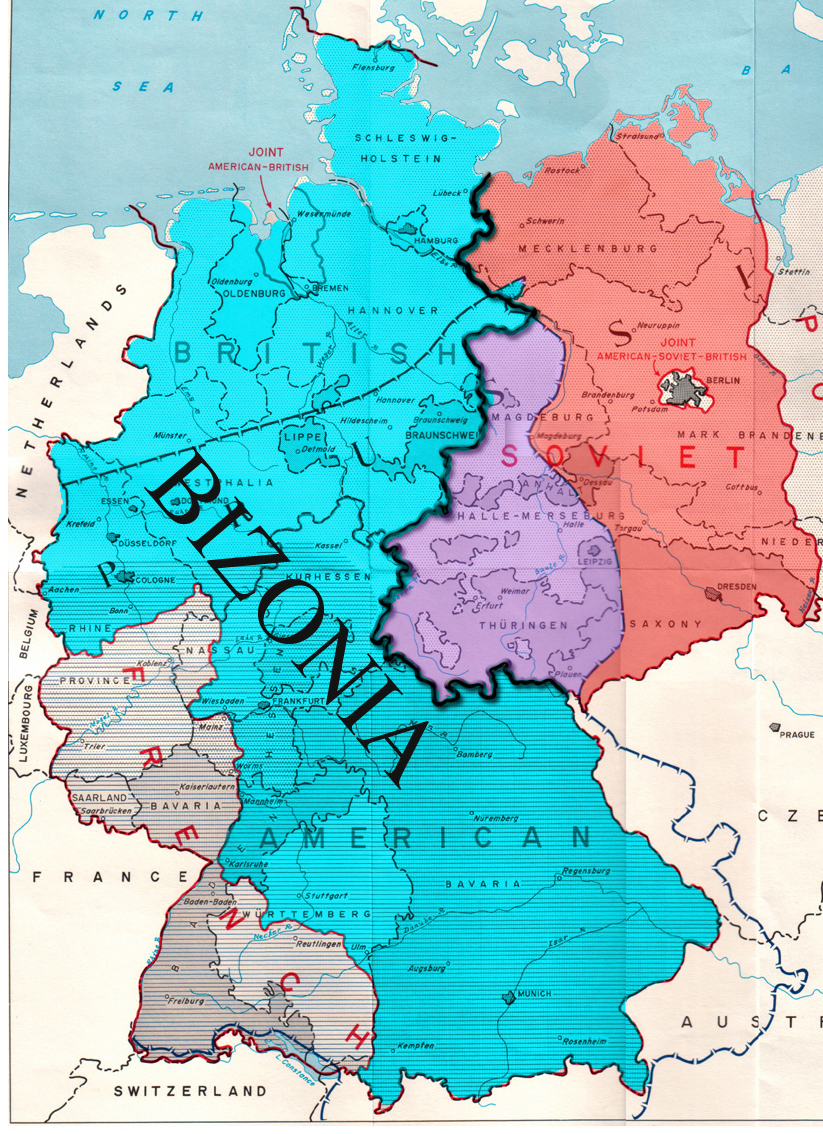
- Capital: Frankfurt am Main
- Common languages: German; English; French; Bavarian; Low German
- Religion: Christianity (Catholic, Lutheran); Judaism
- Government: Occupied administration
- Legislature: Bizonal Economic Council
- Historical era: Aftermath of World War II
  - Established: 1 January 1947
  - Disestablished: 23 May 1949

Population
- 39 million
- Currency: AM-Mark (to 20 June 1948); Deutsche Mark (from 20 June 1948)
Preceded by
American zone
British zone
French zone
Succeeded by
West Germany
- Today part of: Germany

The Bizone (German: [ˈbiːˌt͡soːnə]) or Bizonia was the combination of the American and the British occupation zones on 1 January 1947 during the occupation of Germany after World War II. With the addition of the French occupation zone on 1 August 1948 the entity became the Trizone (German: [ˈtʁiːˌt͡soːnə]; sometimes jokingly called Trizonesia (German: Trizonesien, German pronunciation: [tʁit͡soˈneːzi̯ən])). Later, on 23 May 1949, the Trizone became the Federal Republic of Germany, commonly known as West Germany.

== History ==
=== Division of Germany into occupation zones ===
At the conclusion of World War II, the Allies began organising their respective occupation zones in Germany. The easternmost lands were permanently annexed to either Poland or the Soviet Union. The lands that were to remain "German" were divided four ways: The Americans occupied the South, the British the West and North, France the South-West, and the Soviets Central Germany (the future East Germany). Berlin was similarly divided into four zones.

=== Initial breakdown of four-zone cooperation ===
Cooperation between the four occupying powers broke down between 1945 and 1947. The Soviet Union, which encouraged and partly carried out the post-war expulsions of Germans from the areas under its rule, stopped delivering agricultural products from its zone in Germany to the more industrial western zones, thereby failing to fulfill its obligations under the Potsdam Agreements to provide supplies for the expellees, whose possessions had been confiscated. At Potsdam, it had been agreed that 15% of all equipment dismantled in the Western zones – especially from the metallurgical, chemical, and machine manufacturing industries – would be transferred to the Soviets in return for food, coal, potash (a basic material for fertilisers), timber, clay products, petroleum products, etc. The Western deliveries had started in 1946.

The Soviet deliveries – desperately needed to provide the eastern expellees with food, heat, and basic necessities, and to increase agricultural production in the remaining cultivation area – did not materialise. Consequently, the American military administrator, Lucius D. Clay, stopped the transfer of supplies and dismantled factories from the Ruhr area to the Soviet sector on 3 May 1946 while the expellees from the areas under Soviet rule were deported to the West until the end of 1948. As a result of the halt of deliveries from the western zones, the Soviet Union started a public relations campaign against American policy and began to obstruct the administrative work of all four zones.

=== Local governance by zone ===
The Soviets had established central administration in their zone for nutrition, transport, jurisdiction, finance, and other areas already in July 1945, before the participants of the Potsdam Conference had officially agreed to form central German administrations. The central administrations (Zentralverwaltungen) in the Soviet zone were not a form of German self-government, but were rather subdivisions of the Soviet Military Administration in Germany (SVAG), which had the legislative power. The states in the Soviet zone had only limited functions.

After Potsdam, in the summer of 1945, the Control Commission for Germany – British Element (CCG/BE) in Bad Oeynhausen created central offices (Zentralämter) for its zone. Its chairpersons were appointed by the British military government and were more influential than the minister-presidents of the states in the British zone, which at the time were administrative bodies rather than republics. After March 1946 the British zonal advisory board (Zonenbeirat) was established, with representatives of the states, the central offices, political parties, trade unions, and consumer organisations. As indicated by its name, the zonal advisory board had no legislative power, but was merely advisory. The Control Commission for Germany – British Element made all decisions with its legislative power.

In reaction to the Soviet and British advances, in October 1945 the Office of Military Government, United States (OMGUS) encouraged the states in the US zone to form a co-ordinating body, the so-called Länderrat (council of states), with the power to legislate for the entire US zone. It created its own central bodies (Ausschüsse or joint interstate committees) headed by a secretariat seated in Stuttgart. While the British and Soviet central administrations were allied institutions, these US zone committees were not OMGUS subdivisions, but instead were autonomous bodies of German self-rule under OMGUS supervision.

France had not participated in the Potsdam Conference, so it felt free to approve some of the Potsdam Agreements and ignore others. Generally the French military government obstructed any interzonal administrations in Allied-occupied Germany; it even blocked interstate co-operation within its own zone, aiming at total decentralisation of Germany into a number of sovereign states. Therefore, the states in the French zone were given a high level of autonomy but under French supervision, inhibiting almost any interstate co-ordination.

=== Interzone efforts ===
At a conference of representatives of the states (Länder) within the American and British zones of occupation during 5-11 September 1946, decisions were taken on administrative bodies for the economy (Minden), transportation (Frankfurt am Main), food and agriculture (Stuttgart), postal and radio communications (Frankfurt am Main), and a German Finance Commission (Stuttgart). On 6 September, at the conference in Stuttgart, US Secretary of State James F. Byrnes delivered a Restatement of Policy on Germany, referring to the need for German economic unity and the development of its economic powers, as well as the strengthening of the Germans' responsibility for their own politics and economy, repudiating the Morgenthau Plan.

=== Formation of Bizonia ===
At the conference of minister-presidents of the Länder in the British and American zones on 4 October 1946 in Bremen, proposals were discussed for the creation of a German Länderrat (Länder Council), after the US example. In New York on 2 December 1946, British Foreign Secretary Ernest Bevin and his American counterpart James F. Byrnes agreed on the economic unification of the American and British zones, effective 1 January 1947.

The Americans and the British united their zones on 1 January 1947, creating the Bizone, in order to advance the development of a growing economy accompanied by a new political order in northwestern, western and southern Germany. In early 1947 the British zonal advisory board was restructured according to the example of the US zone Länderrat, so that the states in the British zone were empowered as autonomous legislating bodies, with the British military government confining itself to supervision. No agreement with the Soviets was possible. Allowing the states in the Soviet zone to govern the central administrations, then still subject to the SVAG, would have meant the end of communist rule in the east. If the state parliaments and governments were not clearly dominated by communists, as had resulted from the last somewhat free elections in the Soviet zone in 1946, the Soviet Union would have had to waive the establishment of a communist dictatorship in the Soviet zone. The Soviets had begun mass expropriations of entrepreneurs, real estate owners, and banks in September 1945, a process that had continued ever since.

The Bizone was the first step in coordinating the policies in at least two zones of occupation in Germany, which up to that time had operated mostly unconnected due to French obstructionism. The establishment of the Bizone became the nucleus of the future West Germany, ignoring for the time being the SVAG dominated policy in the Soviet zone and the anti-collaboration attitude imposed onto the states in the French zone. At the Washington Conference of Foreign Ministers (4–8 April 1949) France agreed to merge its zone with the Bizone into the Trizone. The unification of the three zones materialised only six weeks before the formation of the Federal Republic of Germany on 24 May 1949, with France only reluctantly having permitted the participants from its zone to join the necessary preparations.

The economic management of the two zones was handled by the Administrative Council for the Economy, based in Minden. Later, administrative cooperation expanded, paving the way to a West German rump state, even though many West German politicians were still strongly opposed to this. With the Bizone, the foundation for new constitutional and economic developments was laid, cemented by the currency reform of June 1948. On the other hand, Germany was now on a track to the eventual division into an East and a West. The United States and the United Kingdom had emphasised the administrative and economic nature of the Bizone, but it still counts as the basis for the founding of the Federal Republic of Germany, which took over the rights and duties of the administration of the Bizone (Article 133 of the Grundgesetz).

On 29 May 1947, the American and British military governments signed an agreement creating an Economic Council for the Bizone, to be based in Frankfurt am Main.

Lewkowicz argues that the establishment of the Bizone was the most significant factor in the creation of two blocs in Europe and therefore in the configuration of the Cold War international order.

=== Trizonia, end of inter-Allied control, and formation of West Germany ===
Bizonia governance was extended to include the French occupation zone on 1 August 1948 and the resulting structure was unofficially called either Trizonia or Trizonesia. Relations among the four occupying powers continued to deteriorate, and the quadripartite structures became unmanageable. In March 1948, the Allied Control Council ceased to operate and was replaced for the Trizone by the Allied High Commission. Subsequently, the Trizone became the Federal Republic of Germany, commonly known as West Germany, on 23 May 1949. The Soviet-sponsored Kommandatura ceased to operate in June 1948.

== Geography and population ==
The Bizone included the Länder Schleswig-Holstein, Hamburg, Lower Saxony, Bremen, North Rhine-Westphalia, Hesse, Bavaria, and Württemberg-Baden – the northern part of the later Baden-Württemberg – but not the states of the French zone, to wit Württemberg-Hohenzollern, Baden, Rheinland-Pfalz, or those in the Soviet zone Mecklenburg, Brandenburg, Saxony-Anhalt, Thuringia, and Saxony. Neither part of Berlin was part of the Trizone nor were any former parts of Germany, such as the Saarland, which, since February 1946, had not been under the joint allied (French) occupational control. The Bizone had a population of approximately 39 million.

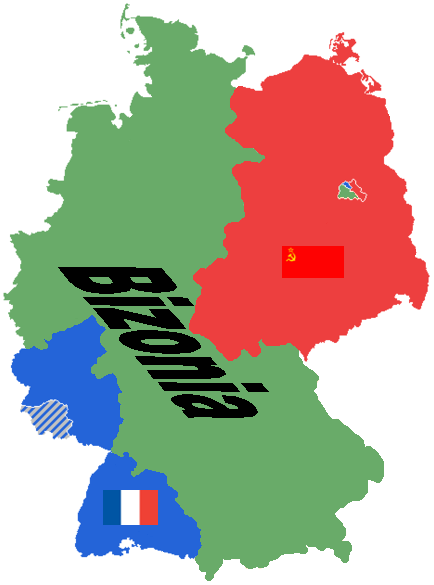
Bizone

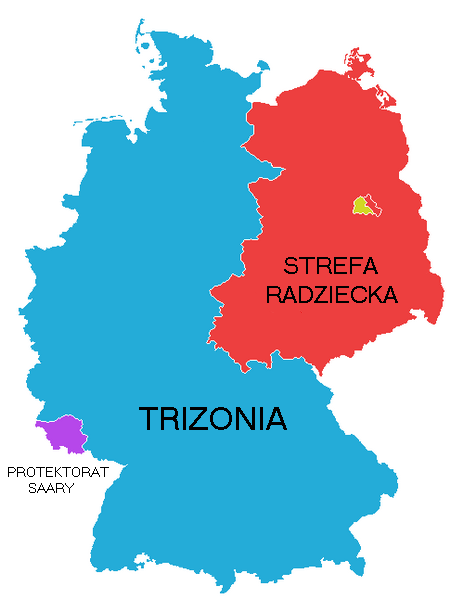
Trizone

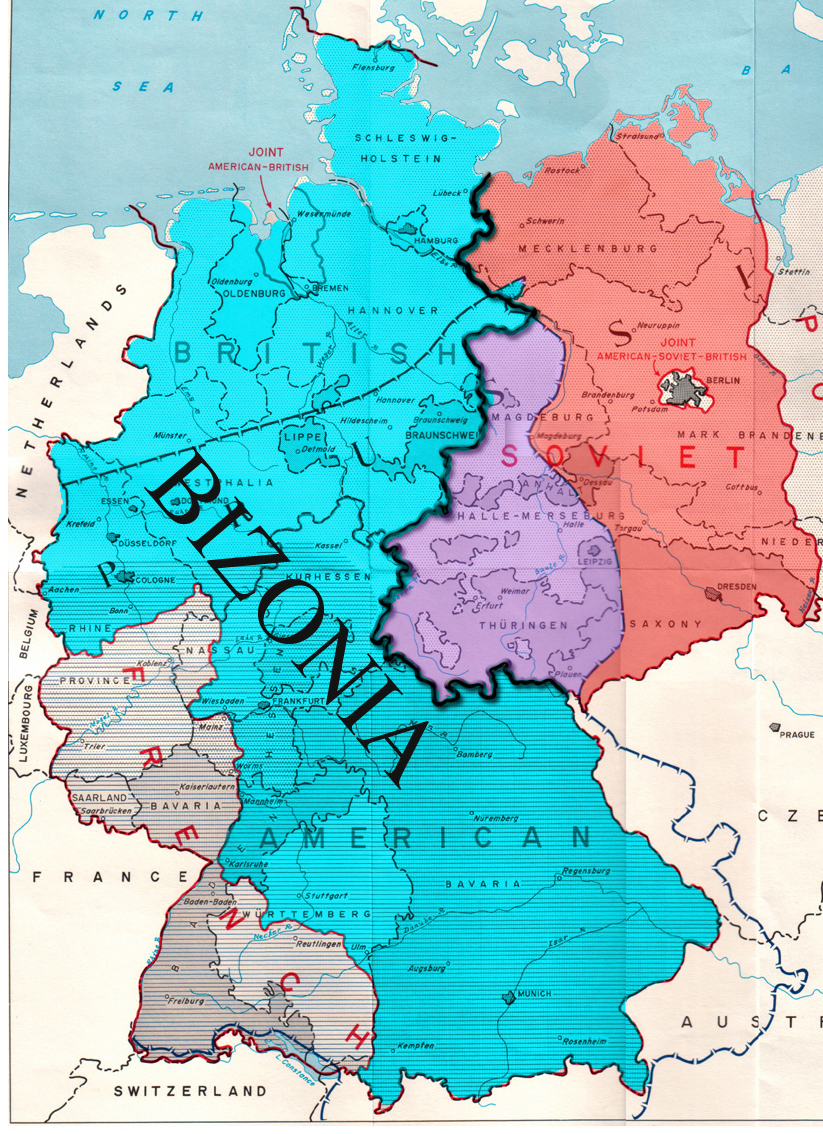

== British military deployments ==
- British Army of the Rhine (later British Forces Germany, now British Army Germany)
- Royal Air Force Germany

== United States military deployments ==
- United States Air Forces in Europe
- U.S. Seventh Army
- U.S. Third Army
