= Trizonesien-Song =

1948 German carnival song

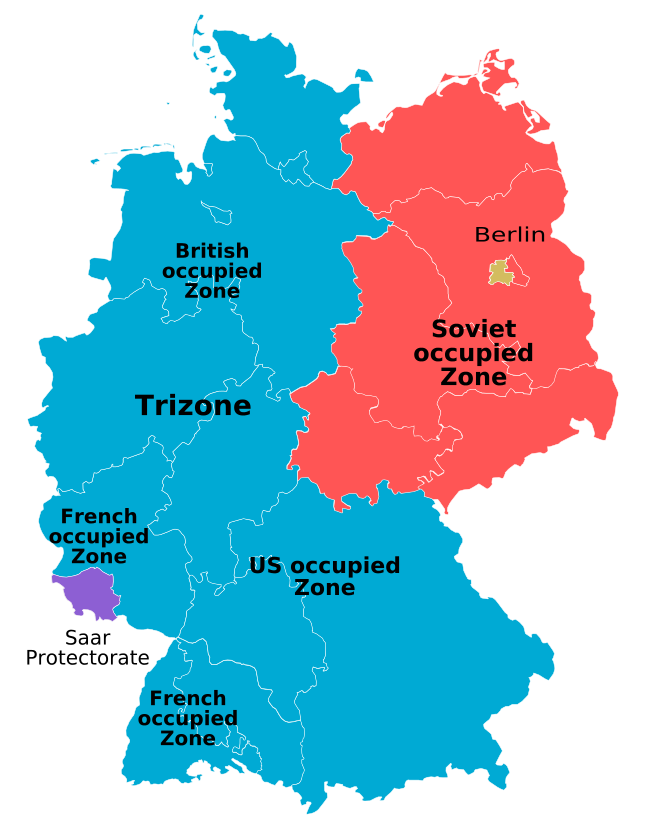
The partition of Germany in 1948

"Trizonesien-Song" ('Trizonesia Song') is a humorous German carnival song written by Karl Berbuer in 1948. It took on the role of a frivolous national anthem substitute for West Germany at a time when there was no official anthem. The song is a self-deprecating, ironic statement of the three western zones' unsolved constitutional status while the three powers, the United States, the United Kingdom and France, occupied the west of Germany.

== History ==
On 8 April 1948, France joined the Bizone, previously formed of the US and UK occupied areas of Germany since the end of World War II. This led to the area being renamed to the Trizone. Berbuer had the idea for the song in 1947 while sitting in a restaurant near Cologne Cathedral where the Bizone was being discussed. Someone in the group mentioned the new word 'Bizonesia'. With the addition of France, Berbuer created the word 'Trizonesia'. He premiered the song on 11 November 1948; the official date of publication was 17 December 1948.

At the time, there was no official German national anthem. The "Deutschlandlied" had ceased to be official since the surrender of Nazi Germany to the allies. Because of this and the popularity of the song, it was used at sporting events as an alternative song to represent Germany. In England, it was initially seen as an indication of an emerging revanchism, but was also later played as a replacement national anthem. At a football match in a British prisoner-of-war camp, the song was played alongside "God Save the King" as a national anthem. It was also played at a cycle race in Cologne in 1949 at the awards ceremony. The allied military officers present mistook it for the German national anthem, and rose from their seats.

In 1950, the West German chancellor Konrad Adenauer held a press conference in Berlin addressing this occurrence, where he said: "I believe it was last year at a sporting event in the Cologne Stadium. There were also Belgian military present. At the end the national anthems were played, and the band, who obviously had a very efficient and intelligent leader, and had no particular instructions about what should be played for Germany, played the lovely carnival song Ich bin ein Einwohner von Trizonesien [sic]. What I'm telling you now is secret — not for publication: many Belgian soldiers stood up and saluted, believing that it was the national anthem."
