= Ranks and insignia of the Reichsbahn =

Ranks and insignia of the Reichsbahn show the grades, titles, and rank insignia of the Deutsche Reichsbahn during the period 1935–1945.

== Pay grades, titles, and army equivalent ==
Paygrade in the Reichsbahn	Equivalent paygrade in the Reichsbesoldungs- Ordnung	Titles	Army equivalency
17a	-	Reichsbahnhelfer	Unteroffizier
17	-	Bahnwart; Schrankenwart	Unteroffizier
16	A10b	Amtsgehilfe; Pförtner; Botenmeister	Unteroffizier
15	-	Maschinist; Materialaufseher; Leitungsaufseher/Leitungsoberaufseher; Rottenführer; Rangieraufseher; Bahnhofsschaffner/Oberbahnhofsschaffner; Fahrladeschaffner/Oberfahrladeschaffner; Triebwagenschaffner/Triebwagenoberschaffner; Zugschaffner/Oberzugschaffner; Weichenwart/Oberweichenwart	Unteroffizier
14a		Obermaschinist	Unteroffizier
14	A10a	Wagenaufseher; Amtsmeister; Hausinspektor; Oberbotenmeister; Reichsbahnbetriebsassistent	Feldwebel
13	A9a	Lokomotivheizer; Triebwagenführer	Feldwebel
12	-	Materialmeister; Leitungsmeister; Rottenmeister; Rangiermeister; Lademeister; Stellwerksmeister; Oberlokomotivheizer; Reichsbahnbetriebswart	Feldwebel
11	A8a	Reservelokomotivführer; Wagenmeister; Signalwerkführer; Telegrafenwerkführer; Werkführer; Reichsbahnassistent	Oberfeldwebel
10	-	Zugführer	Oberfeldwebel
9a	-	Oberleitungsmeister; Oberrottenmeister; Oberrangiermeister; Oberlademeister; Oberstellwerksmeister; Oberwagenmeister; Obersignalwerkführer; Obertelegrafenwerkführer; Oberwerkführer; Oberzugführer	Oberfeldwebel
9	A7a	Lokomotivführer; Signalwerkmeister; Telegrafenwerkmeister; Wagenwerkmeister; Werkmeister; Reichsbahnsekretär	Stabsfeldwebel
8	A5b	Seesteuermann	Leutnant
7a	A4d	Oberlokomotivführer; Signaloberwerkmeister; Telegrafenoberwerkmeister; Wagenoberwerkmeister; Oberwerkmeister; Reichsbahnobersekretär	Leutnant
7	A4c2	Reichsbahninspektor	Oberleutnant
6	A4b1	Reichsbahnoberinspektor	Hauptmann
5	A3b	Reichsbahnamtmann with less than three years in the grade	Hauptmann
5	A3b	Reichsbahnamtmann	Major
4	A2d	Reichsbahnoberamtmann	Major
3	A2c2	Reichsbahnrat	Major
2	A2b	Reichsbahnoberrat	Oberstleutnant
1a	A1b	Reichsbahndirektor	Oberst
1	A1a	Ministerialrat; Vizepräsident; Abteilungspräsident	Oberst
B7a	B7a	Präsident RBD	Generalmajor
B4	B4	Ministerialdirektor	Generalleutnant
B3b	B3b	Staatssekretär und Stellvertretender Generaldirektor	General
B3a	B3a	Reichsverkehrsminister und Generaldirektor	Generaloberst

== Uniform regulations of 1935 ==
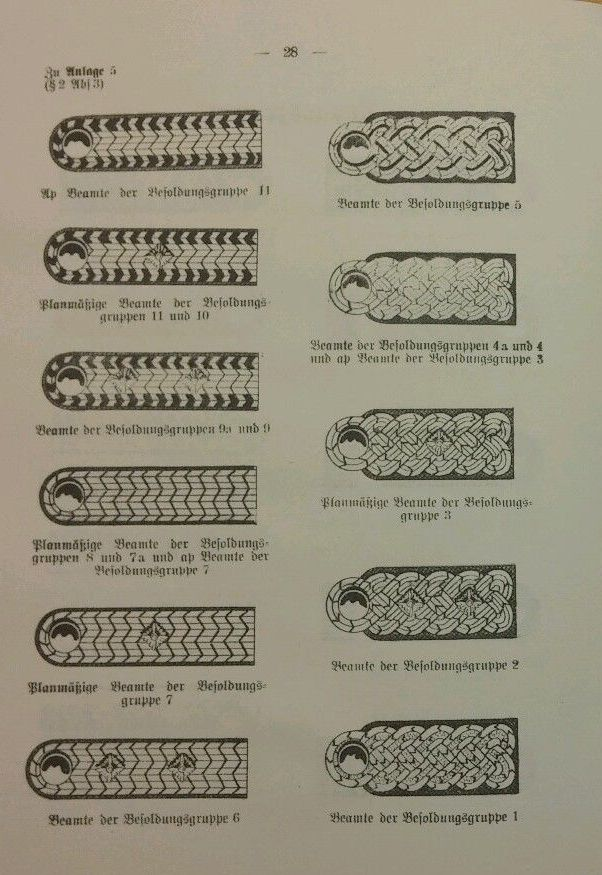
Rank insignia for paygrades 1–11.

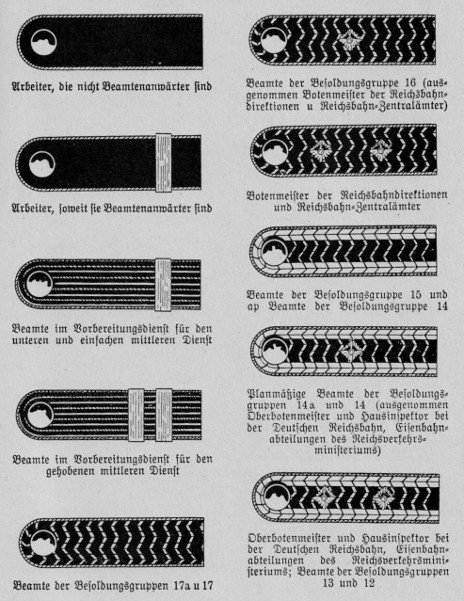
Rank insignia for paygrades 12–17a and workers.

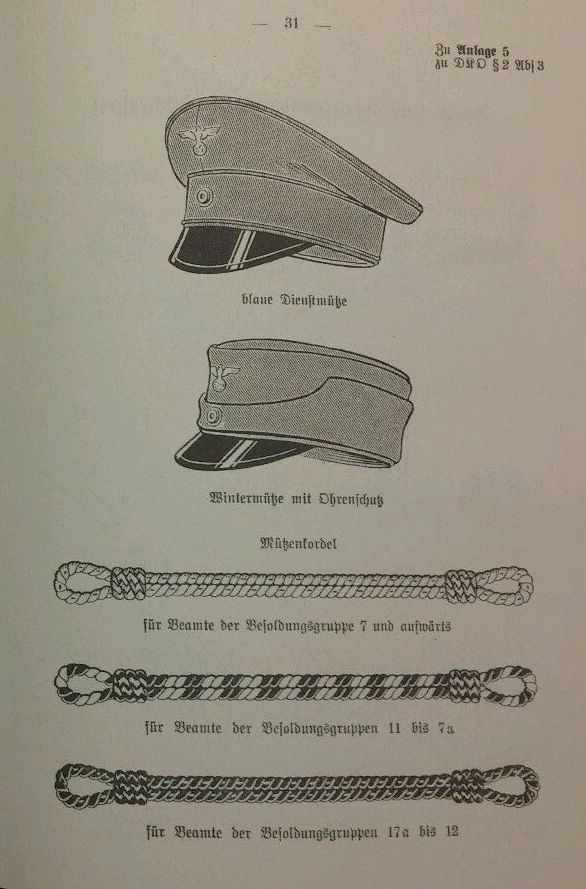
Uniform details for paygrades 1-17a. Chin straps from top to bottom: Higher and upper career groups, middle career group, lower career group.

== Uniform regulations of 1941 ==
The first uniform regulations of 1941 exchanged the pips on the epaulets for rosettes. They also introduced collar patches denoting career groups.

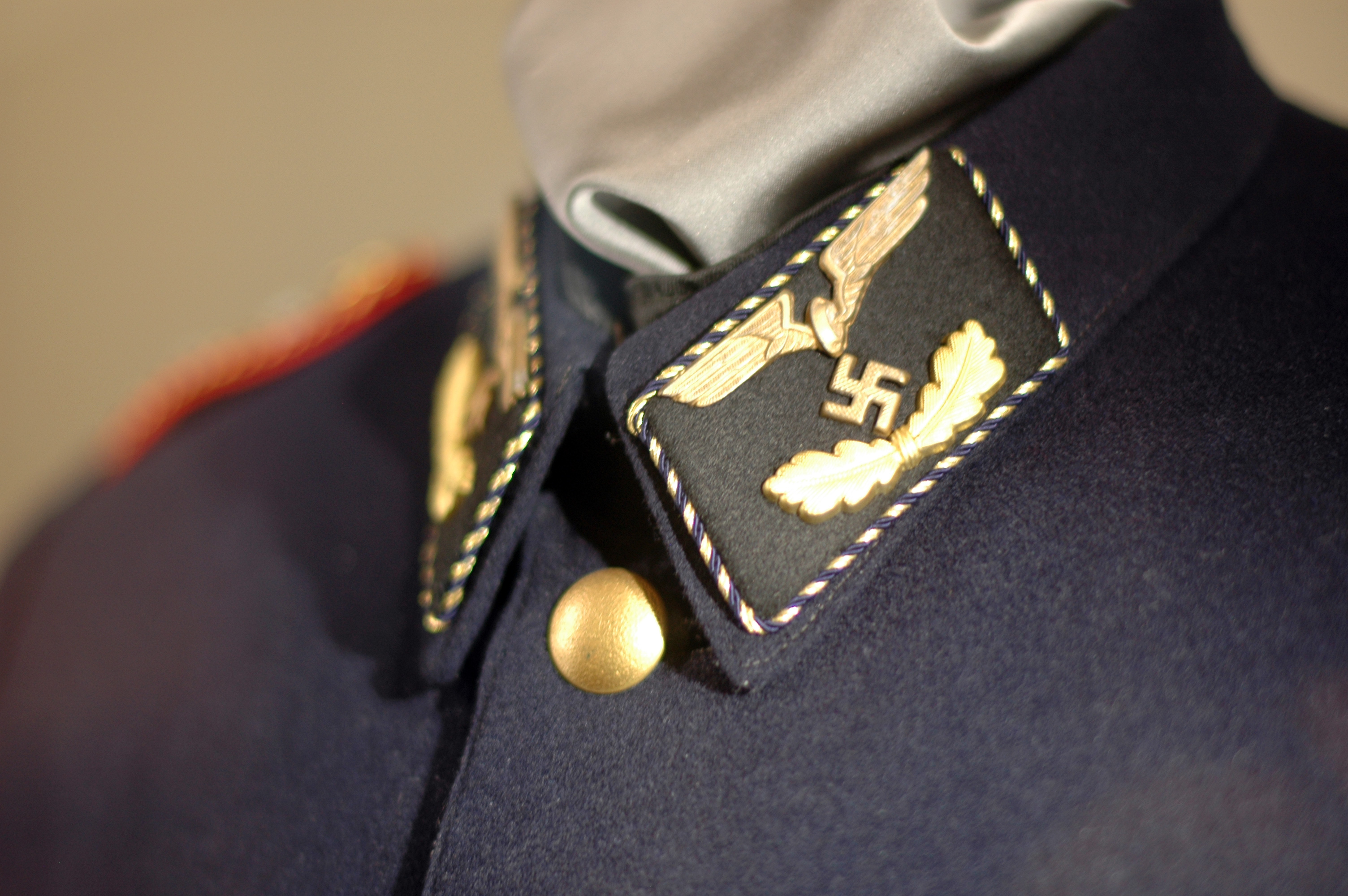
Collar patch for railway officials of the middle career group, 1941.

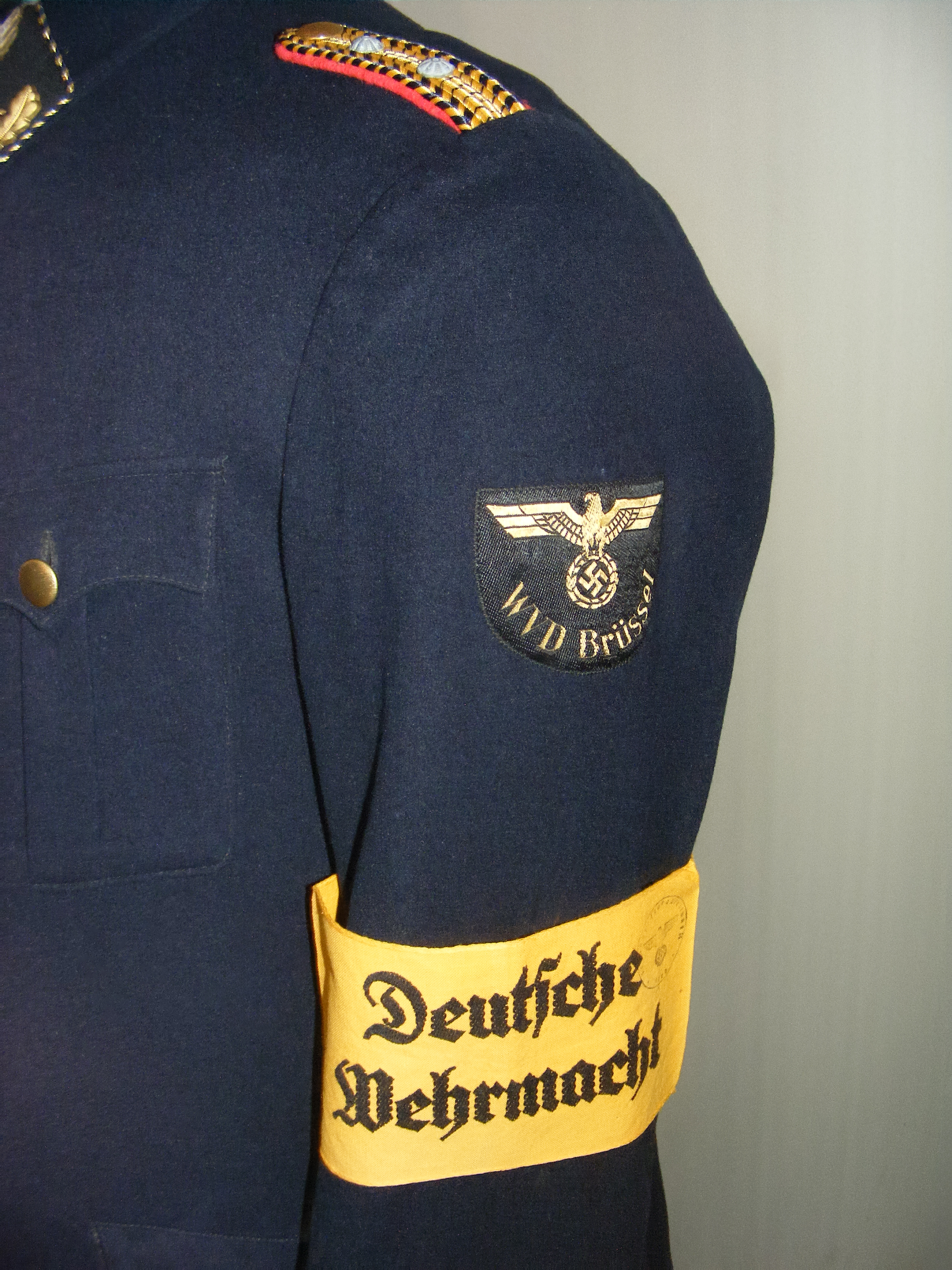
Rank insignia for a railway official in paygrade 9a/9, serving in Wehrmachts-Verkersdirektion Brüssel (occupied Belgium. The yellow armlet denotes him as a combatant according to the law of war.

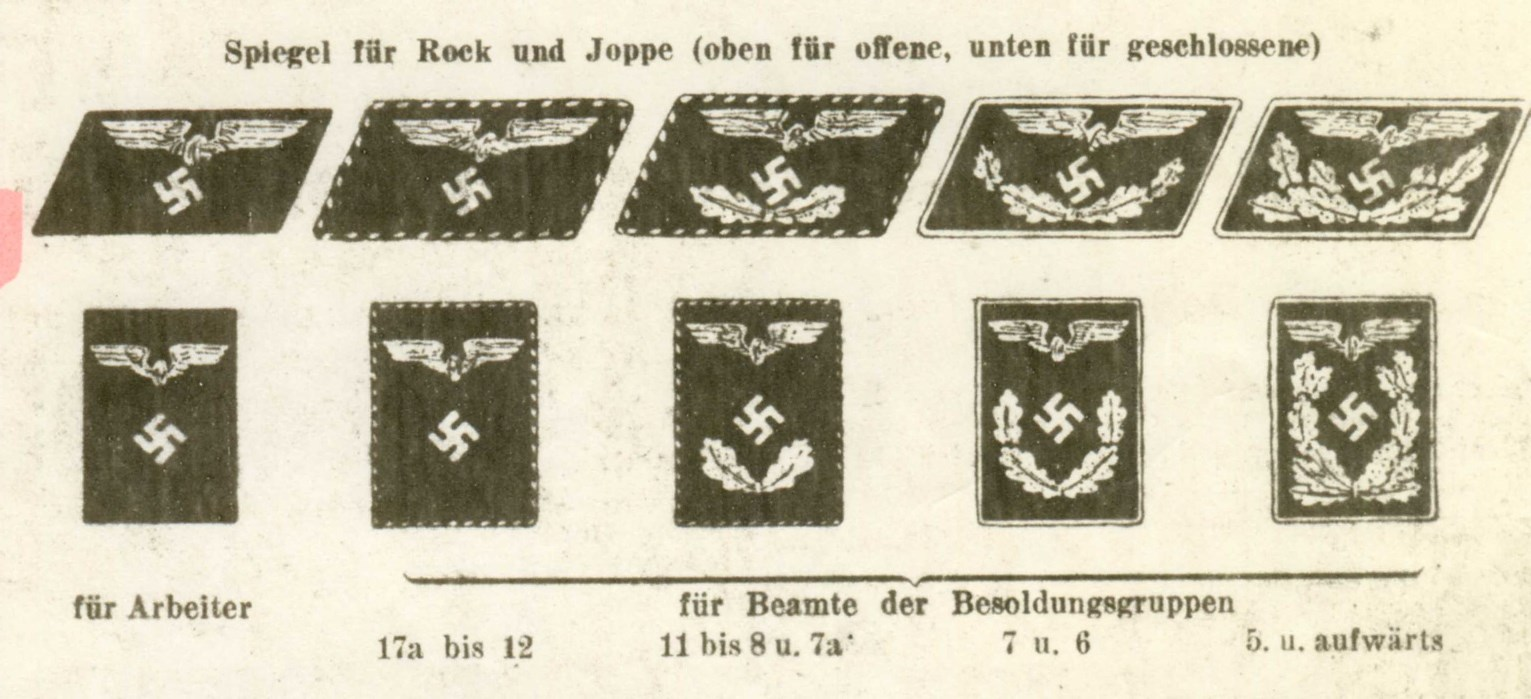
Collar patches for railway workers and officials.

Shoulder boards, collar tabs, tunics, coats, caps, cuff titles and belts according to the 1941 regulations.
