= Deutsche Reichsbahn service ranks =

Since its beginning until the year 1991, service ranks were a permanent element of service with the Deutsche Reichsbahn, the former German national railway system, whether as a civil servant or as an employee. Every railroad employee was obliged to wear the conferred insignia while on duty and entitled to do so off duty. The service rank was conferred with a certificate. The first conferral was designated as a certification, each additional conferral as a promotion.

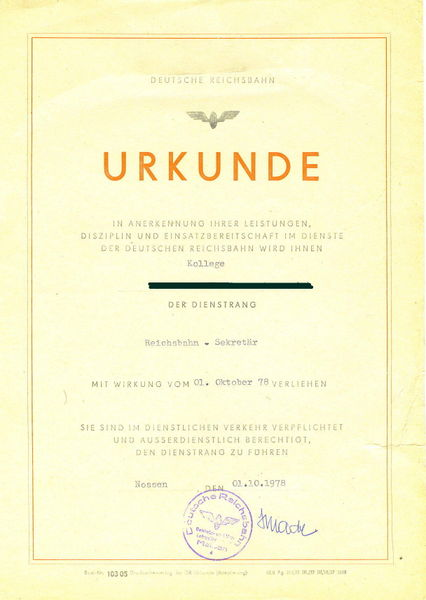
Certificate for Reichsbahn secretary

== Weimar Republic ==
=== Service Ranks from 1924 to 1935 ===
As a result of a competition, a single service uniform that eliminated of the previous badges and embellishments was introduced throughout the Reich for all members of the Reichsbahn. Service rank and respective division were recognizable from the collar insignia.

== Nazi Germany ==
=== Service Ranks from 1935 to 1945 ===
==== Uniform regulations of 1935 ====
In July 1935, a new uniform was introduced with specialty and division badges and epaulets as rank insignia for civil servants and workers.

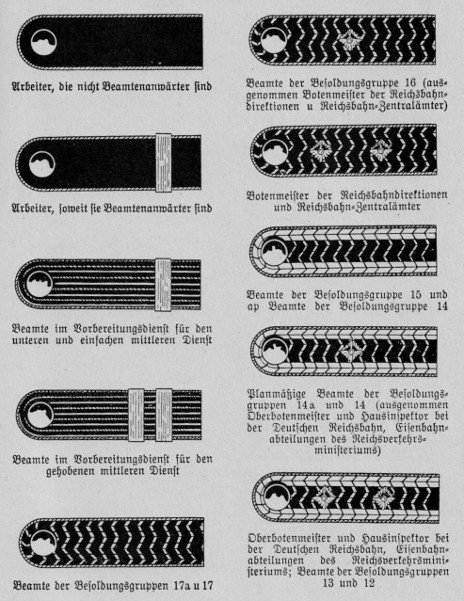
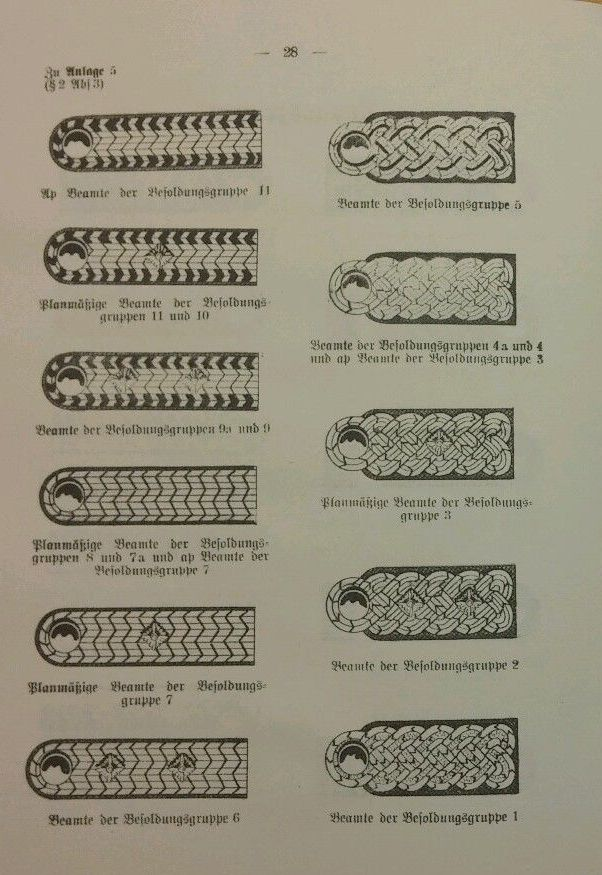
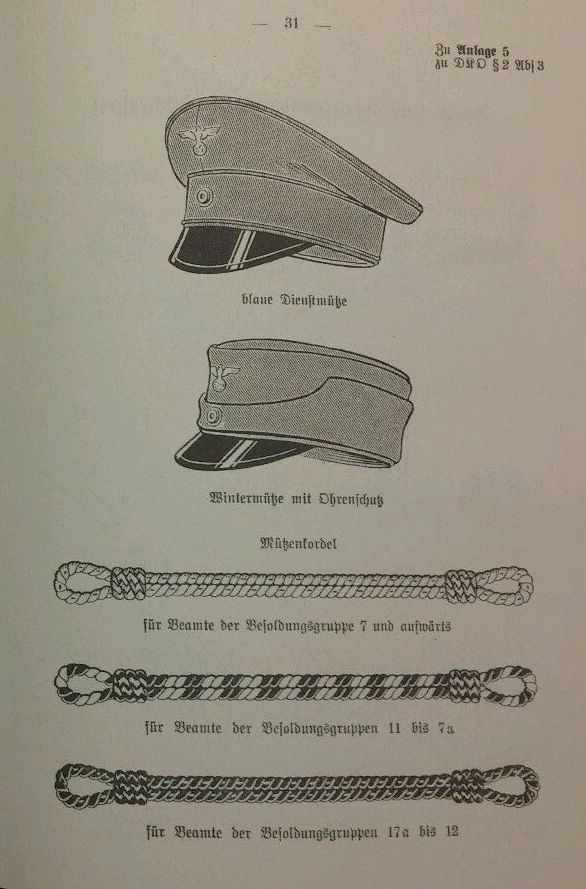
Rank insignia for the Deutsche Reichsbahn according to the uniform regulations of 1935.

==== Uniform regulations of 1941 ====
Shoulder boards, collar tabs, tunics, coats, caps, cuff titles and belts according to the uniform regulations of 1941.

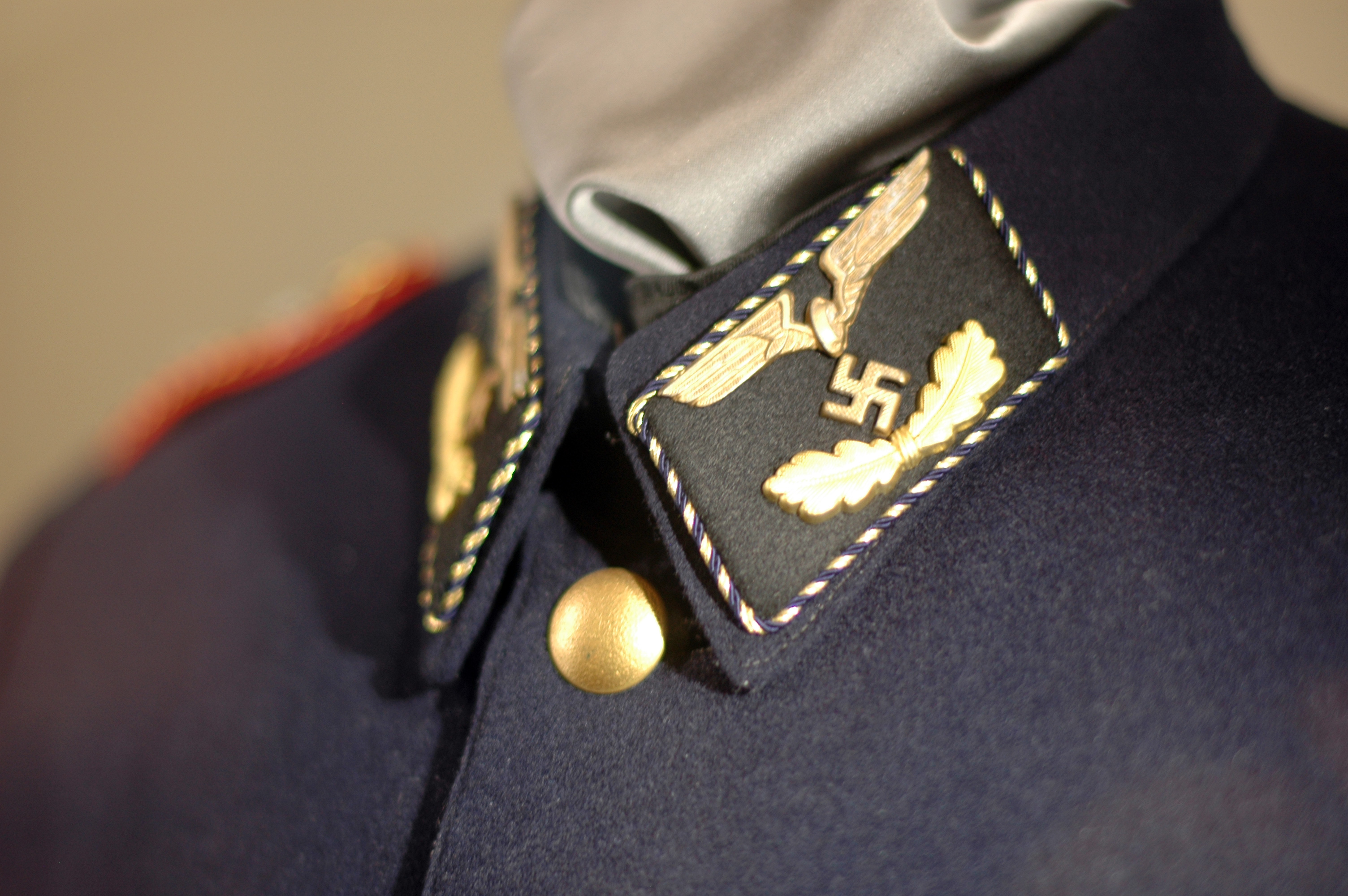
Collar patch for railway officials of the middle career group, 1941.

Rank insignia for a railway official in paygrade 9a/9.

The first uniform regulations of 1941 exchanged the pips on the epaulets for rosettes. They also introduced collar patches denoting career groups.

== East Germany ==
=== Service Ranks from 1945 to 1957 ===
After the end of the Second World War, the pre-war service ranks were retained in the German Democratic Republic in the Deutsche Reichsbahn (East Germany). The uniforms, however, were soon brought into accord with the Soviet model. This was especially apparent in the epaulets. Basically, many railway employees wore uniforms, and the military cut and service grades reflected the semi-military character of the railways in the GDR. This was combined with an overly elevated degree of security awareness, readiness, and secrecy.

=== Service Ranks from 1957 to 1962 ===
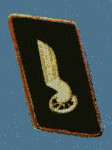

The collar insignia borders of rank groups I to IV bore the colors of the respective main service branch. The example shows a collar insignia of the main service branch operations and traffic service (red).

==== Rank group I ====
The cap gimp of this rank group was blue interwoven with gold.

Service Rank	Abbreviation	Epaulet
Lehrling B+V-Helfer	Lehrl BV-Helf	
Lehrling	Lehrl	
Eisenbahner	Eb	
Reichsbahn-Unterassistent and Zugschaffner	RUAss und Zsch	
Reichsbahn-Assistent	RAss	

==== Rank Group II ====
The cap gimp of this rank group was blue and gold in the relationship of 2:2.

Service Rank	Abbreviation	Epaulet
Ingenieurschüler first semester	Ingsch	
Ingenieurschüler after the first semester	Ingsch	
Reichsbahn-Untersekretär, Zugführer, Lokomotivheizer	RUS, Zf, Lokh	
Reichsbahn-Sekretär and Reservelokomotivführer	RS und ResLf	
Reichsbahn-Obersekretär and Lokomotivführer	ROS and Lf	
Reichsbahn-Hauptsekretär and Oberlokomotivführer	RHS and OLf	

=== Service Ranks from 1962 to 1974 ===
The main service branches were recognizable from the colors of the piping on the caps as well as by the borders of the epaulets and collar insignia.

In this context

1. red for operations and traffic service
2. blue for mechanical management
3. gray for coach management
4. green for railroad property and construction
5. yellow for security and communications

==== Rank group I ====
The cap gimp of this rank group was blue interwoven with gold.

Service Rank	Abbreviation	Epaulet
Eisenbahner	Eb	
Reichsbahn-Unterassistent and Zugschaffner	RUAss and Zsch	
Reichsbahn-Assistent	RAss	

Apprentices wore epaulets as with the Eisenbahner service rank, but instead of the star, one or two loops in gold with blue stripes were worn.

==== Rank Group II ====
The cap gimp of this rank group was blue and gold in the relationship of 2:2.

Service rank	Abbreviation	Epaulet
Reichsbahn-Untersekretär, Zugführer and Lokomotivheizer	RUS, Zf and Lokh	
Reichsbahn-Sekretär and Reservelokomotivführer	RS and ResLf	
Reichsbahn-Obersekretär and Lokomotivführer	ROS and Lf	
Reichsbahn-Hauptsekretär and Oberlokomotivführer	RHS and OLf	

Students of the Gotha Engineering School, the Eisenach and Altenburg high schools and the Dresden engineering school for Railroad Studies wore the epaulets similar to the service rank of Reichsbahn-Untersekretär, except that instead of the stars, a gold loop with blue stripes was worn.

After the second semester, students in the engineering schools wore epaulets similar to Reichsbahn-Untersekretär, except that instead of stars, two gold loops with blue stripes were worn.

=== Service Ranks from 1974 to 1991 ===
The color differentiation of the main service branches was retained (see 1962 to 1974)

The collar insignia borders of rank groups I to IV bore the colors of the respective main service branch. The example shows a collar insignia of the main service branch operations and traffic service (red).

Service ranks were discontinued by the Reichsbahn in 1991. Every employee received a note which stated only that he was entitled to continue wearing the previous rank "off duty".

==== Rank group I ====
The cap gimp of this rank group was blue interwoven with gold.

Service Rank	Abbreviation	Epaulet
Lehrling Teilausbildung	Lehrl Teilausb	
Lehrling leaving the 8th class	Lehrl 8. Kl	
Lehrling leaving the 10th class	Lehrl 10. Kl	
Lehrling leaving the 10th class with Abitur	Lehrl Abi	
Reichsbahn-Unterassistent	RUAss	
Reichsbahn-Assistent	RAss	
Reichsbahn-Oberassistent	ROAss	
Reichsbahn-Hauptassistent	RHAss	

==== Rank Group II ====
The cap gimp of this rank group was blue and gold in the relationship of 2:2.

Service Rank	Abbreviation	Epaulet
Reichsbahn-Untersekretär	RUS	
Reichsbahn-Sekretär	RS	
Reichsbahn-Obersekretär	ROS	
Reichsbahn-Hauptsekretär	RHS	

==== Rank Group III ====
Service Rank	Abbreviation	Epaulet
Student der Ingenieurschulen	Stud Ing	
Student der Hochschule	Stud HfV	
Absolvent der Hochschule	Abs HfV	
Reichsbahn-Inspektor	RI	
Reichsbahn-Oberinspektor	ROI	
Reichsbahn-Amtmann	RA	
Reichsbahn-Oberamtmann	ROA	

==== Rank Group IV ====
Service Rank	Abbreviation	Epaulet
Reichsbahn-Rat	RR	
Reichsbahn-Oberrat	ROR	
Reichsbahn-Hauptrat	RHR	

==== Rank Group V ====
Service Rank	Abbreviation	Epaulet
Reichsbahn-Direktor	RD	
Reichsbahn-Oberdirektor	ROD	
Reichsbahn-Hauptdirektor	RHD	
Stellvertreter des Generaldirektors der DR	Stv. GD	
Stellvertreter des Generaldirektors der DR, Staatssekretär, Stv. Minister	Stv. GD	
Minister für Verkehrswesen und Generaldirektor der DR	GD	

== See also ==
- Deutsche Reichsbahn (East Germany)
- Deutsche Bundesbahn
