= Landesjustizkasse =

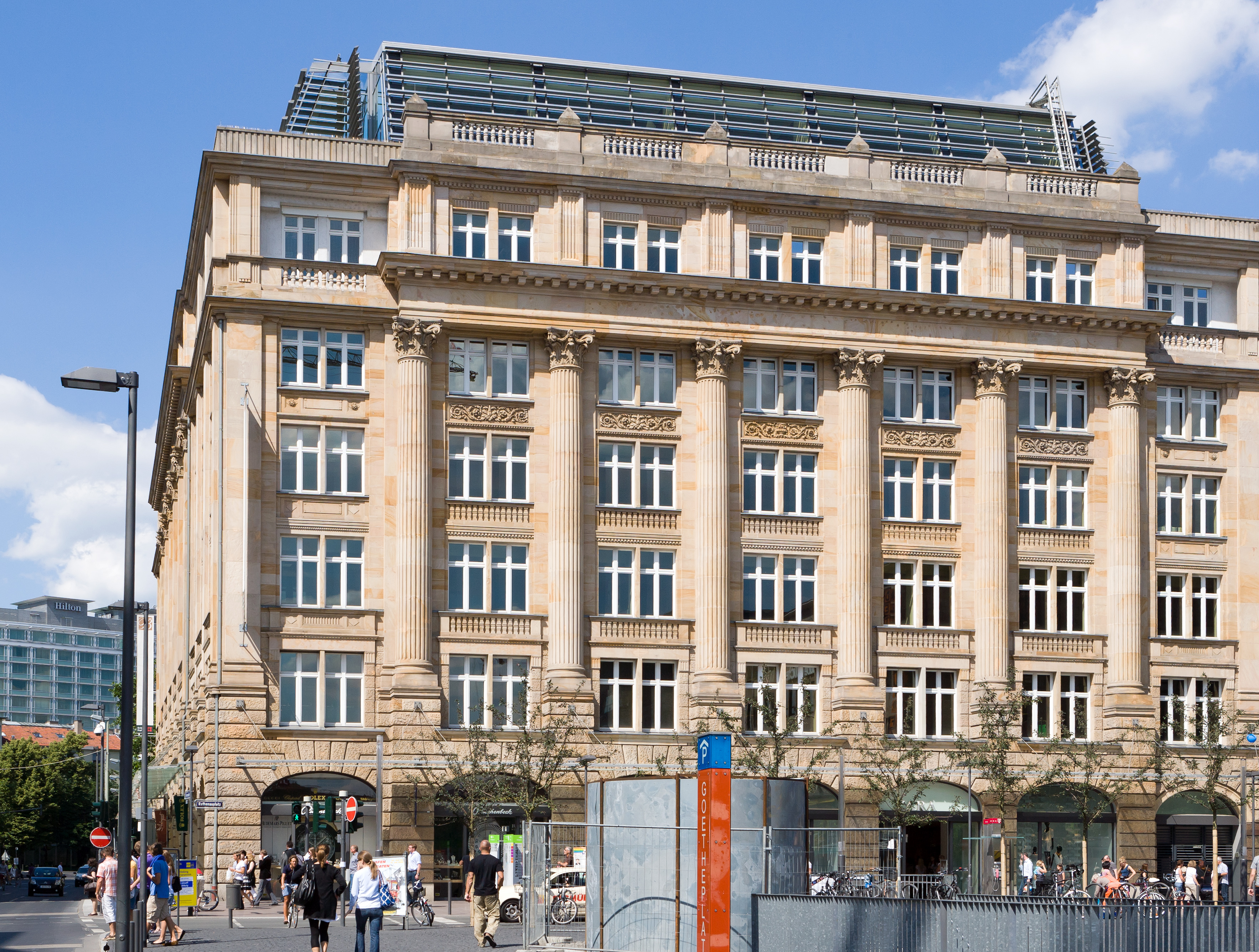
Börsenstraße 2–4, where the Frankfurt Oberjustizkasse formerly had its offices, along with other tenants

A Landesjustizkasse (lit., "state justice treasury"), Oberjustizkasse (lit., "higher justice treasury") or simply Justizkasse (lit., "justice treasury") is a financial institution within the German judicial system traditionally attached to an Oberlandesgericht (higher state court). Some German states have more than one Oberlandesgericht, but now only one Landesjustizkasse. In some other states the Justizkasse has been merged into a central state treasury.

A Landesjustizkasse or Oberjustizkasse is the central enforcement authority for claims of the state within its jurisdiction area (commonly the entire state), is responsible for the accounting of the judicial authorities in the area, clearing transactions with institutions within the judicial system, court costs, cash deposits of the lower courts, and other tasks. It thus partially functions as an internal bank for the judiciary.

The head of a Landesjustizkasse or Oberjustizkasse typically holds (or held) the civil service rank Oberregierungsrat (senior government councillor), Regierungsdirektor (government director) or Leitender Regierungsdirektor (senior government director); the directorship is itself a function, not a civil service rank. According to the states' regulations about the representation of the state (Vertretungsordnung), the head of a Landesjustizkasse or Oberjustizkasse is one of the direct representatives of the state in the judicial field, together with the Minister of Justice, the attorney general and the President of the Correctional Service.

The older designation Oberjustizkasse has been replaced with Landesjustizkasse or other designations. Some German states with more than one Oberjustizkasse have centralized them into one Landesjustizkasse, while other states have merged the Justizkasse into a central state treasury with broader responsibilities than the judicial system. The last institution known as an Oberjustizkasse, the Oberjustizkasse in Hamm with over 160 employees and which handled claims of over a billion euro annually, was renamed Zentrale Zahlstelle Justiz in 2015.
