= Deutsche Reichsbahn (East Germany) =

State railway of the German Democratic Republic (1945–1993)

- "DR-Kreis" logo used from 1949 to 1994
- Industry: Rail transport
- Predecessor: Deutsche Reichsbahn
- Founded: 7 October 1949; 76 years ago
- Defunct: 1 January 1994; 32 years ago
- Fate: Merged with Deutsche Bundesbahn
- Successor: Deutsche Bahn
- Headquarters: 33 Voßstraße, East Berlin, East Germany
- Area served: East Germany (1949–1990); Germany (1990–1994)

Deutsche Reichsbahn (DR; German pronunciation: [ˈdɔʏtʃə ˈʁaɪçsˌbaːn], lit. 'German Realm Railways') was the state-owned railway in the German Democratic Republic (East Germany) from 1949 and 1990, and the New States after German reunification until 1 January 1994. It was operated by the Ministry for Transport and was the largest employer in East Germany.

The DR was formed from Deutsche Reichsbahn assets in the Soviet occupation zone as a separate entity from the Deutsche Bundesbahn (DB) in West Germany. It was responsible for passenger and freight railway services in East Germany and certain locations in West Berlin. Both DR and DB continued as separate entities in reunified Germany until 1994, when they merged to form Deutsche Bahn.

== Organisation ==
The DR was created as a state-owned firm upon the founding of the German Democratic Republic (GDR or East Germany) on 7 October 1949 and directly subordinated to the Main Administration for Transportation of the Soviet Military Administration of Germany until 1951. In 1951, the Main Administration for Transportation was dissolved and became the East German Ministry for Transport. In April 1953, this was abolished and the General Directorate for Railroads became the Ministry for Railroads (Ministerium fuer Eisenbahnwesen (MFE)). In November 1954, it was reorganised into the Ministry for Transport (or in some translations, Ministry for Traffic)( Ministerium für Verkehrswesen). There were now separate secretariats for rail, water and highways and in 1957 a section for Civil air was added.

The DR was formed from the assets of the pre-existing national Deutsche Reichsbahn located in the Soviet occupation zone in the aftermath of World War II. From November 1954 until November 1989, the GDR Minister of Transport also occupied the position of the Director General of the DR (Generaldirektor der Deutschen Reichsbahn). The headquarters of the DR were located in East Berlin at No. 33 Voßstraße, close to the Berlin Wall and across from the site of the former Reich Chancellery. It was administratively subdivided into eight regional directorates (Reichsbahndirektionen) with headquarters in Berlin, Cottbus, Dresden, Erfurt, Greifswald, Halle, Magdeburg, and Schwerin.

Mitropa provided the catering services to the DR, both on board trains and in stations.

== Passenger service ==
The DR was centrally directed according to socialist principles within the context of a centrally-planned command economy. By 1989, 17.2% of the passenger transport volume in the GDR was handled by the DR – three times the market share of the Deutsche Bundesbahn (DB) in West Germany. Fares were fairly cheap, but trains tended to be overcrowded and slow, owing in part to the poor condition of most railway lines in the GDR. The DR did offer a limited number of express trains such as the "Neptun" (Berlin – Copenhagen), "Vindobona" (Berlin – Vienna), "Karlex" (Berlin – Carlsbad), and "Balt-Orient-Express" (Berlin – Bucharest).

== Electrification ==
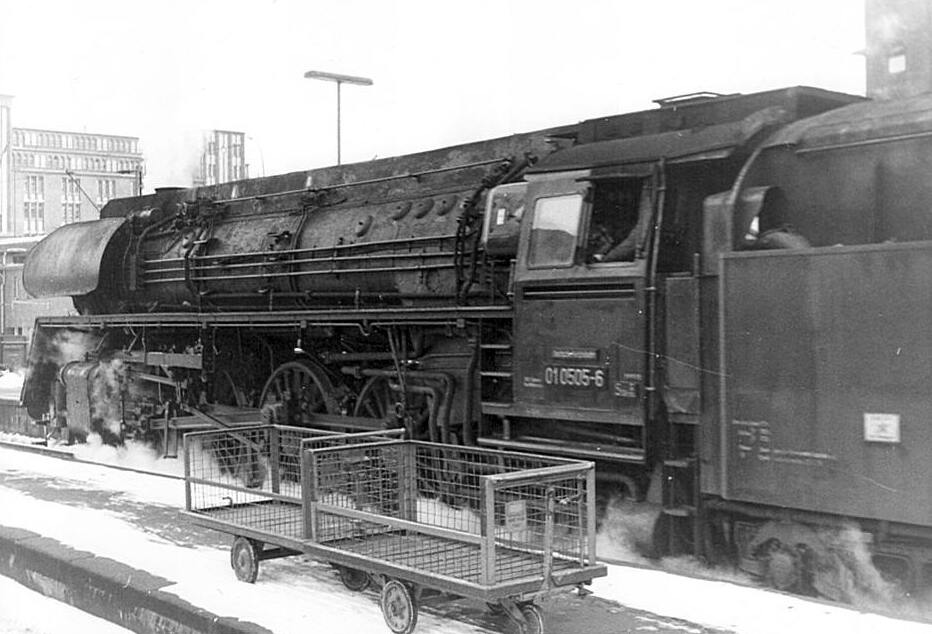
In March 1971, the DR's Interzone express departs Hamburg for Berlin with class 01.5 steam power, a 4-6-2 "Pacific".

Steam engines were the workhorses after the war and remained important for a long time into the period of German partition. The DR's last steam engine (on normal-gauge tracks) was taken out of service on 28 May 1988. Much of the electrified rail network that existed in (present-day) eastern Germany in 1945 had been removed and sent to the Soviet Union as war reparations in the early years of Soviet occupation. By the early 1970s, only a small portion of the tracks in the GDR had been electrified in comparison with those in Western Europe; the GDR leadership chose to reduce the pace of electrification and instead relied on mostly Russian-made diesel locomotives due to the easy availability of fuel from the Soviet Union at subsidised prices.

When the GDR's energy costs began to rise dramatically in the early 1980s (in part because the Soviet Union ceased to subsidize the price of fuel sold to the GDR), the DR embarked on a large rail electrification campaign as the GDR's electrical power grid could be supplied with electricity generated from the burning of domestically produced lignite. The electrified rail network grew from 11.5% in 1979 to 27.3% by 1990.

== The DR in Berlin during the Cold War ==
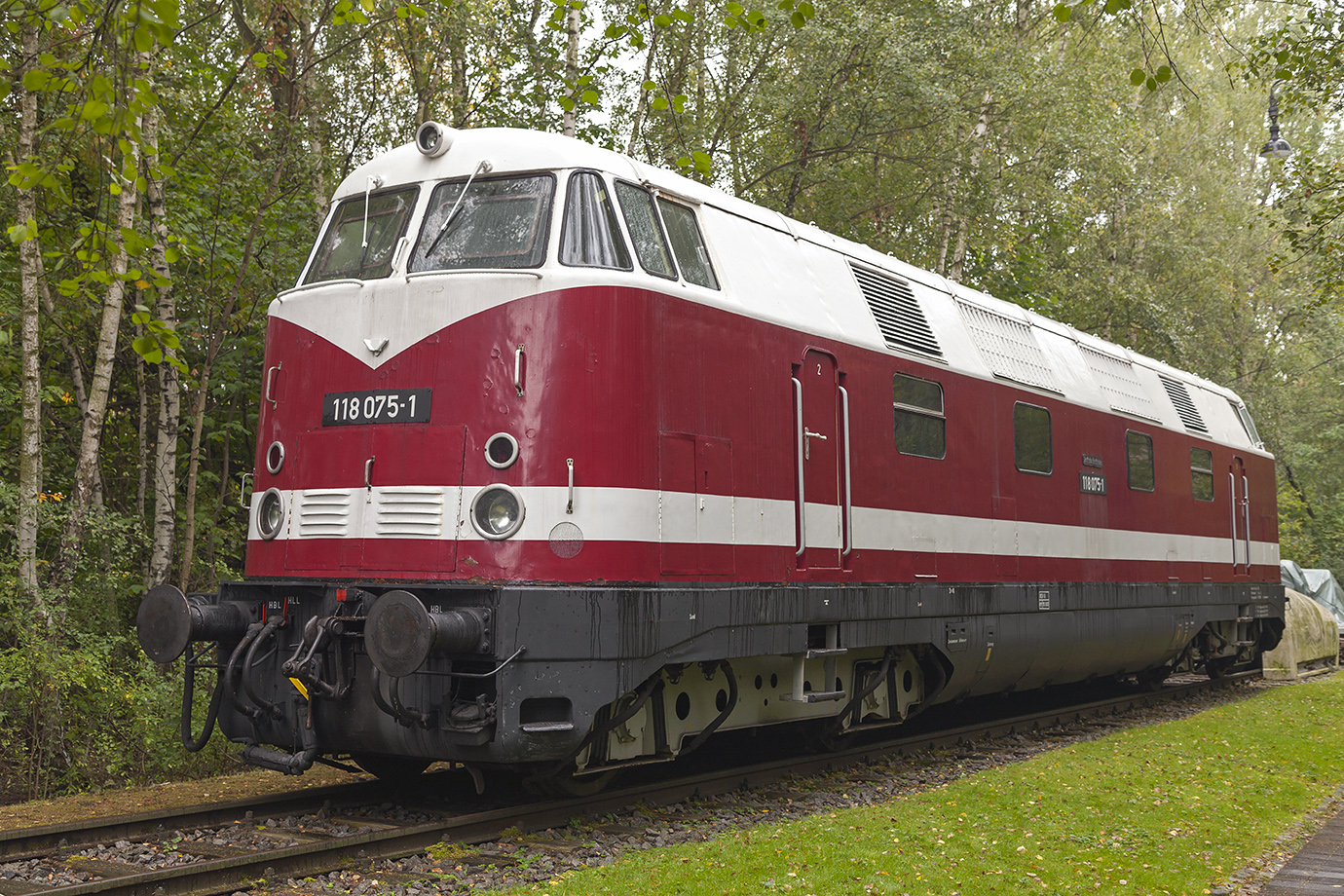
DR Class V 180 built by Lokomotivbau Karl Marx Babelsberg (LKM).

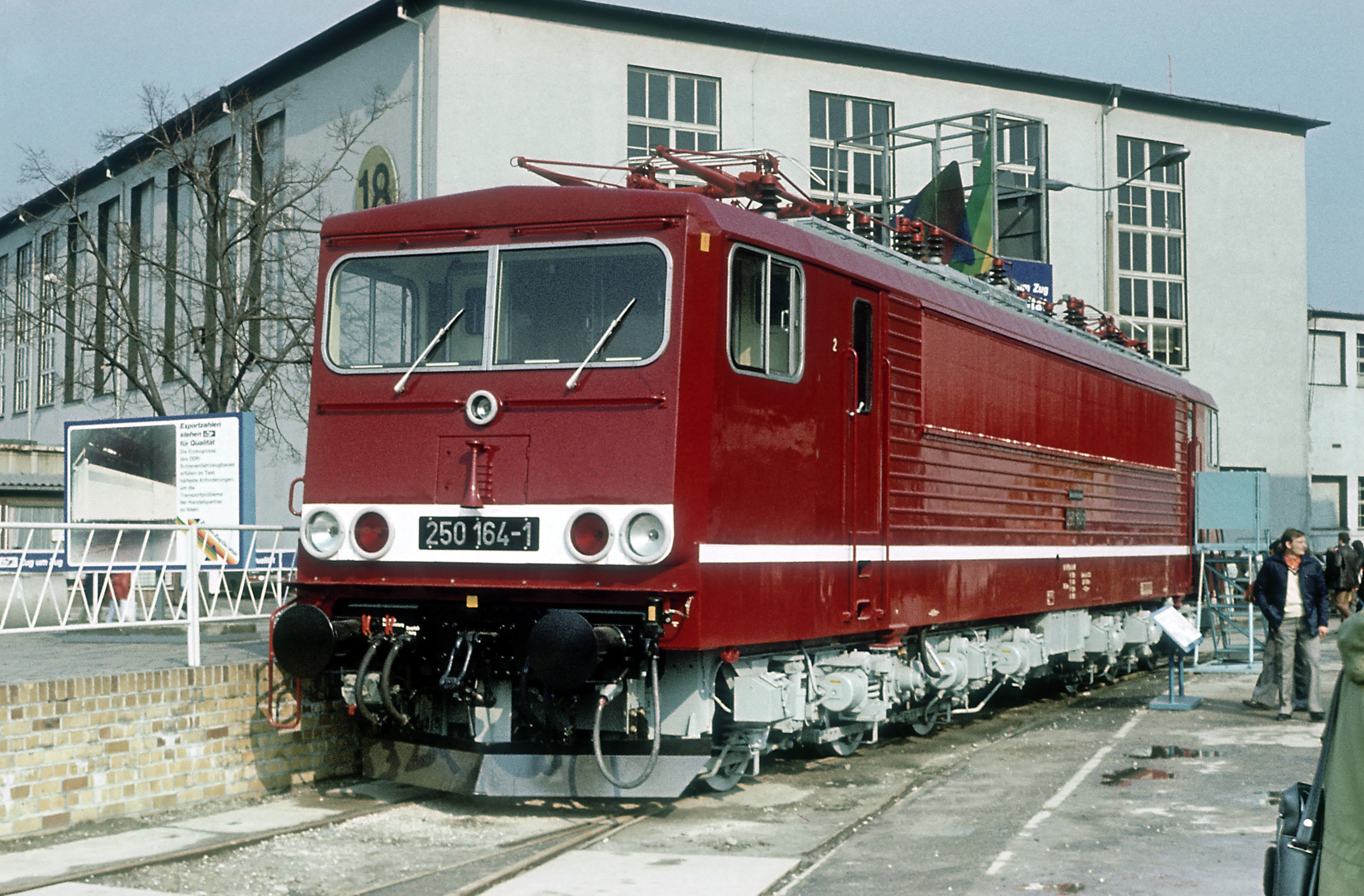
DR Class 250, 1982.

Due to the Four-Power Occupation Agreements for Berlin, in which the long-term division of Germany and Berlin (the partition of Germany into two German states; and Berlin partitioned into two principal zones of occupation, West Berlin and East Berlin) was not foreseen, the DR operated the long-haul railway service (Fernverkehr) and barge canals in both East and West Berlin throughout the years of the Cold War (and also after the reunification of Germany) until the merger of the DR and DB in January 1994. This led to unique situations due to the occupied status of West Berlin and the presence of the DR there. For example, there were Bahnpolizei (railway police) employed by the DR in their West Berlin railway stations who were controlled by the GDR Interior Ministry, although the three Western Allies (the United States, Great Britain, and France) never officially recognized the authority of the GDR government in the Soviet (Eastern) sector of Berlin, let alone in West Berlin. For this reason, the West Berlin Polizei had separate patrols who were empowered to maintain law and order in the West Berlin railway stations.

The West German Deutsche Bundesbahn (DB) maintained a ticket office in West Berlin for a number of years on Hardenbergstraße near the main Zoological Garden railway station that was run by the Eastern Reichsbahn. One reason for this was due to the generally poor customer service offered at the DR's ticket counters. Another reason may have been psychological – to promote a visible West German government presence in West Berlin.

Another oddity was the presence of a ticket counter at the East Berlin station Berlin Ostbahnhof (known as Berlin Hauptbahnhof from 1987 to 1998) operated by the Soviet (later Russian) military to facilitate transport of their personnel to and from Russia. A special military train regularly operated between Berlin and Moscow until 1994 when the Russian military finally withdrew from Germany. Each of the Western Allies also maintained its stations and ticket offices in its respective zone:

- United States: Lichterfelde West;
- United Kingdom: Charlottenburg; and
- France: Tegel.

The Western Allies operated military trains over DR lines converging on the route between Berlin-Wannsee and Marienborn. DR conductors and engine crews managed these trains while military transport officers and soldiers dealt with their passengers and the Soviet military checkpoint officials at Marienborn.

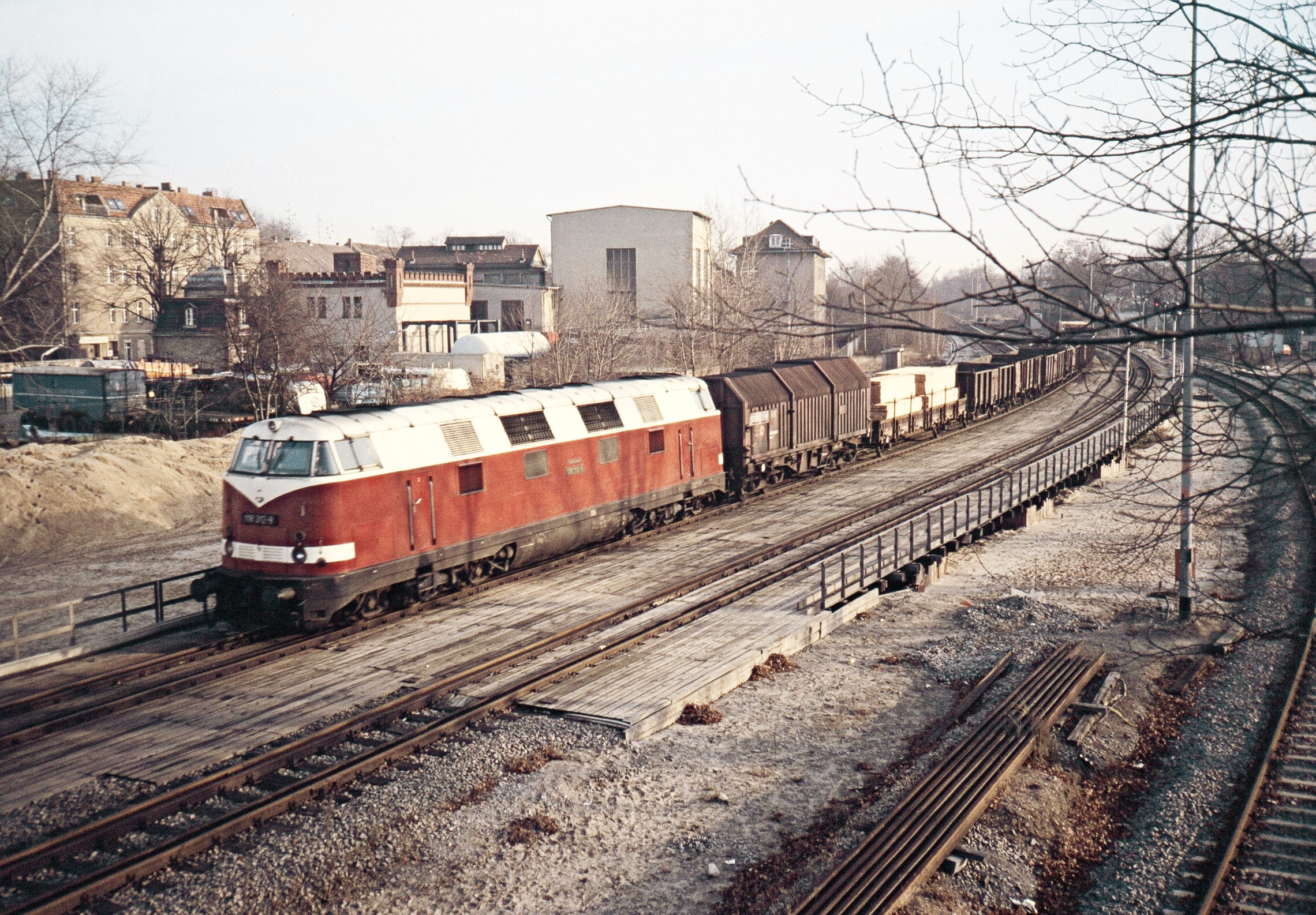
V 180 on the temporary bridge over the Tegel motorway construction site, 1986.

The presence of the DR in West Berlin was costly to the GDR – the annual operating deficit for the DR in West Berlin in the early 1980s was estimated to be around 120-140 million Deutsche Marks. The status of Berlin is also believed to be the reason the East Germans retained the name Deutsche Reichsbahn as it was mentioned as such in transit treaties. After the foundation of East Germany on 7 October 1949, the East German government continued to run all the railways in its territory under the official name Deutsche Reichsbahn, by so doing it maintained responsibility for almost all railway transport in all four sectors of Berlin. Had the DR been renamed, for example, Staatseisenbahn der DDR (State Railways of the GDR) along the lines of other East German institutions, the Western Allies would probably have refused to recognise it as the same or a successor organization and removed its right to operate in West Berlin. The legal necessity of keeping the term 'Deutsche Reichsbahn' explains the unique use of the word 'Reich' (with its Imperial and Nazi connotations) in the name of an official organisation of the communist GDR. This quasi-official presence in West Berlin was apparently of an utmost importance to the GDR regime, otherwise it is hard to explain why the anti-imperialist and cash-strapped GDR government was willing to both continue using the word 'Reich' and incur large hard currency deficits to operate and maintain the West Berlin railway system.

== The S-Bahn in West Berlin during the Cold War ==
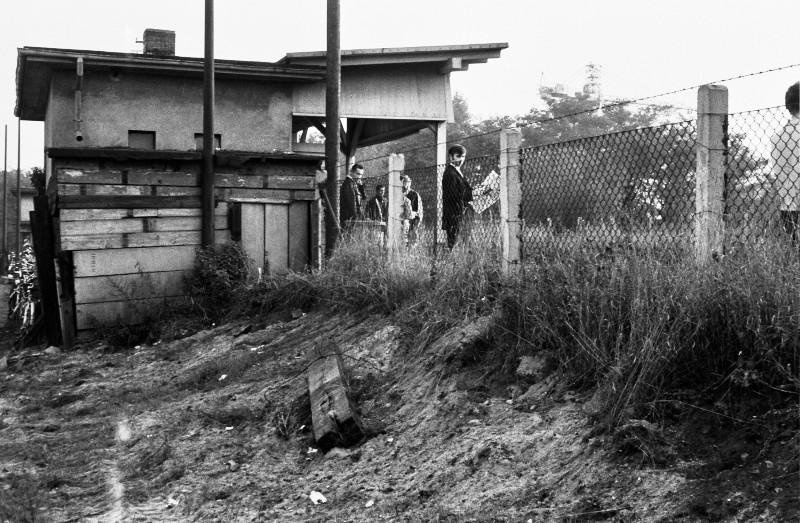
Patchwork conditions on the West Berlin S-Bahn were illustrated in 1969 by this station on the Lichterfelde-Süd Line.

The DR also operated the S-Bahn local train service in West Berlin during much of the Cold War period. Following the erection of the Berlin Wall on 13 August 1961, West Berliners boycotted the S-Bahn in West Berlin. After a strike by West Berlin-based DR employees in September 1980, the S-Bahn service in West Berlin was greatly reduced. Almost half of the West Berlin S-Bahn railway network was closed following this action, including the closure of the western portion of the Berlin circular ring railway (Ringbahn).

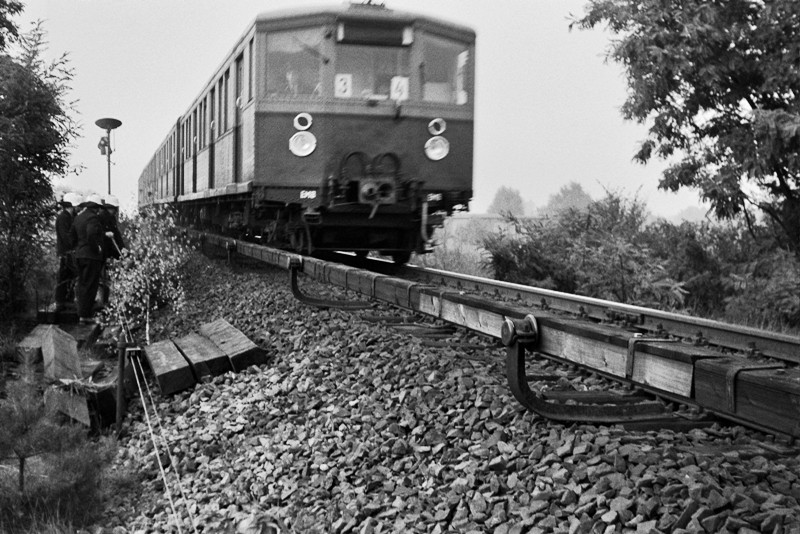
In 1969 a third-rail S-Bahn train eases past West Berlin firemen fighting a trackside fire in untrimmed brush.

On 9 January 1984, a treaty between the GDR and the West Berlin Senate entered into force and turned over the responsibility for the operation of the S-Bahn in West Berlin to the West Berlin transport authority BVG. The BVG gradually restored much of the S-Bahn service that had been previously reduced. Following the reunification in October 1990, the arrangements were kept until the creation of Deutsche Bahn AG on 1 January 1994 when the new company took over all S-Bahn operations in the Greater Berlin region.

It took several years to fully restore all of S-Bahn services throughout the Greater Berlin region. Service on the West Berlin portion of the Ringbahn was not restored until after reunification (in phases, from 1993 to 2002). Capital projects continue to address the backlog of construction needs that developed during the DR-GDR era.

== DR after the reunification of Germany ==
Article 26 of the Unification Treaty (Einigungsvertrag) between the two German states signed on 31 August 1990 established DR as special property (Sondervermögen) of the Federal Republic of Germany, and stipulated that DR be merged with DB at the earliest opportunity. Following reunification, DR and DB continued to operate as separate entities in their respective service areas but coordinated operations. On 1 June 1992, DB and DR formed a joint board of directors which governed both entities. The merger between DR and DB was delayed by several years because German politicians were concerned about the ever-increasing annual operating deficits incurred by both entities. The Federal Ministry of Transport (Bundesverkehrsministerium) proposed a comprehensive reform of the German railway system (Bahnreform) which was approved by the Bundestag in 1993 and went into effect on 1 January 1994. It included the planned merger between DR and DB on 1 January 1994, forming Deutsche Bahn Aktiengesellschaft or AG (Corporation), which is a state-owned limited stock company.

== Leadership ==
The DR was led by a General Director Generaldirektor (GD), a title which, in a similar arrangement to the Ministry of the Interior-led Volkspolizei, was held concurrently by the Minister of Transport from 1950 to 1989. The actual day-to-day operations of the DR were led by the First Deputy General Director (Heinz Schmidt from 1971 to 1988 and Herbert Keddi from 1988 to 1989), who also held the ministerial rank of deputy minister or state secretary in the Ministry of Transport.

Chairman	MfV rank	Tenure
General Director of the Deutsche Reichsbahn; Generaldirektor der Deutschen Reichsbahn
Wilhelm Fitzner	Minister	August 1945 – January 1946
Willi Besener	none	January 1946 – 19 January 1949
Willi Kreikemeyer	none	19 January 1949 – 1950
Erwin Kramer	Minister	1950 – 15 December 1970
Otto Arndt	Minister	15 December 1970 – November 1989
Herbert Keddi	none	November 1989 – 31 Mai 1990
Hans Klemm	N/A	1 June 1990 – 31 August 1991
Heinz Dürr	N/A	1 September 1991 – 1 June 1992
Chairman of the Joint Board of Directors; Vorsitzender des gemeinsamen Vorstandes
Heinz Dürr	N/A	1 June 1992 – 1 January 1994

== See also ==
- List of East German Deutsche Reichsbahn locomotives and railbuses
- Deutsche Reichsbahn service ranks
- Berlin S-Bahn
- Interflug

== Bibliography ==
- Heym, Rudolf (2003). Das Buch der Deutschen Reichsbahn: Erinnerungen an den Schienenverkehr in der DDR [The Book of the Deutsche Reichsbahn: Memories of Rail Transport in the GDR] (in German). München: GeraMond Verlag. ISBN 3765472468.
- Heym, Rudolf (2010). Das Album der Deutschen Reichsbahn: Eisenbahnalltag in der DDR [The Album of the Deutsche Reichsbahn: Railway Everyday in the GDR] (in German) (approved special ed.). München: GeraMond Verlag. ISBN 9783862451029.
- Kuhlmann, Bernd (2013). Deutsche Reichsbahn geheim: Giftzüge, Militärtransporte, Geheimprojekte [Deutsche Reichsbahn Confidential: Poison Trains, Military Transports, Secret Projects] (in German) (fully revised and expanded new ed.). München: GeraMond Verlag. ISBN 9783862451876.
- Kuhlmann, Bernd (2020). Die Deutsche Reichsbahn in West-Berlin – Interzonenverkehr, die S-Bahn und die DR [The Deutsche Reichsbahn in West Berlin - Interzonal Traffic, the S-Bahn and the DR] (in German). Stuttgart: Transpress Verlag. ISBN 9783613713116.
- Preuss, Erich (2001). Der Reichsbahn-Report: 1945–1993; Tatsachen, Legenden, Hintergründe [The Reichsbahn Report: 1945–1993; Facts, Legends, Backgrounds] (in German). Stuttgart: Transpress Verlag. ISBN 9783613711600.
- Preuss, Erich; Preuss, Reiner (2011). Deutsche Reichsbahn intern geheime Akten, brisante Tatsachen [Deutsche Reichsbahn Secret Internal Files, Explosive Facts] (in German). München: GeraMond Verlag. ISBN 9783862451098.
