= Bizonal Economic Council =

Legislative body in occupied Germany

Coordinates: 50.1153°N 8.6778°E

Bizonal Economic Council Wirtschaftsrat
- West Germany

History
- Founded: June 10, 1947
- Succeeded by: Bundestag

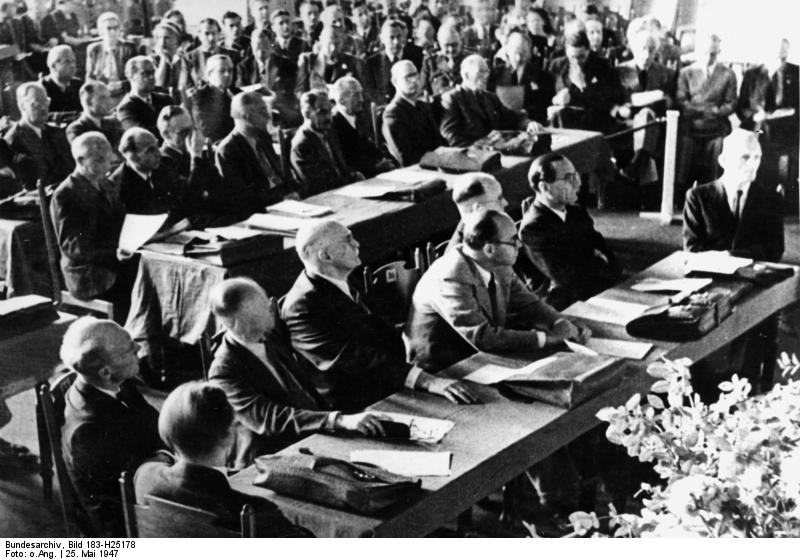
First session of the Economic Council in 1947

The Wirtschaftsrat or Economic Council was West Germany's first post-war legislative parliament and progenitor of the German Bundestag.

After the American Secretary of State George C. Marshall pushed for organisational improvements in the Anglo-American zone of occupation in post-war West Germany, the two Military Governors Lucius D. Clay and Sir Brian Robertson signed the ‘Agreement for Reorganisation of Bizonal Economic Agencies’ on 29 May 1947 resulting in the creation of the so-called Wirtschaftsrat (Economic Council), which became effective on 10 June 1947.

In principle, the Economic Council consisted of three organs concentrated in Frankfurt am Main: the Exekutivrat (Executive Committee) as a second chamber with representatives of the eight Länder in the Bizone, the Direktoren der Verwaltung (Executive Directors) as quasi-ministers presiding over the five already existing administrations, and, finally, the actual Wirtschaftsrat as first post-war parliament. In particular the latter was granted legislative and budgetary competence to facilitate the solution of pressing economic problems and the reconstruction of economic life. On 25 June 1947, the 52 delegates elected in an indirect ballot of one delegate per 750,000 citizens by the Landtage (parliaments) of the eight Länder in the Bizone gathered in Frankfurt am Main; on 9 August, the law for the reorganisation of the bizonal economic agencies was passed. Soon afterwards, however, the constructional flaws of the Economic Council as a whole came to the fore requiring the reorganisation of the bizonal administration. On 9 February 1948, the Frankfurter Statut defining the changes to the Economic Council came into effect. These were the renaming of the Executive Committee as Länderrat, the creation of a Verwaltungsrat (Administrative Council) formed by the Executive Directors and supervised by a chairman officially titled Oberdirektor, and, finally, the doubling of the delegates in the Economic Council, something which did not affect the proportion of political parties in this second economic parliament.

While the Economic Council was a decisive platform for the political debate and factual implementation of any emerging economic concept, the parliament’s resolutions and acts remained subject to the authorisation by the Allied Zwei-Zonen-Amt (Bipartite Board) in Berlin and were controlled by the so-called ‘Zweizonenkontrollamt’ (Bipartite Control Office) (BICO) in Frankfurt. Foreign trade and monetary transactions were carried out by the Allied Joint Export-Import Agency (JEIA). Due to the fact that the Economic Council was restricted in its legislative scope and also not a representative assembly elected by the plebiscite, the bizonal institution was often ill-regarded as quasi-parliament. Nevertheless, this first German parliament after World War II was a central prerequisite for Germany’s political and economic reconstruction and marked an important step towards German political and economic self-determination. Henceforth, German political parties were given the opportunity actively to conduct an economic policy and to affect the definition of an emerging economic model for post-war West Germany.
