= Riqueval Tunnel =

Tunnel in Aisne, France

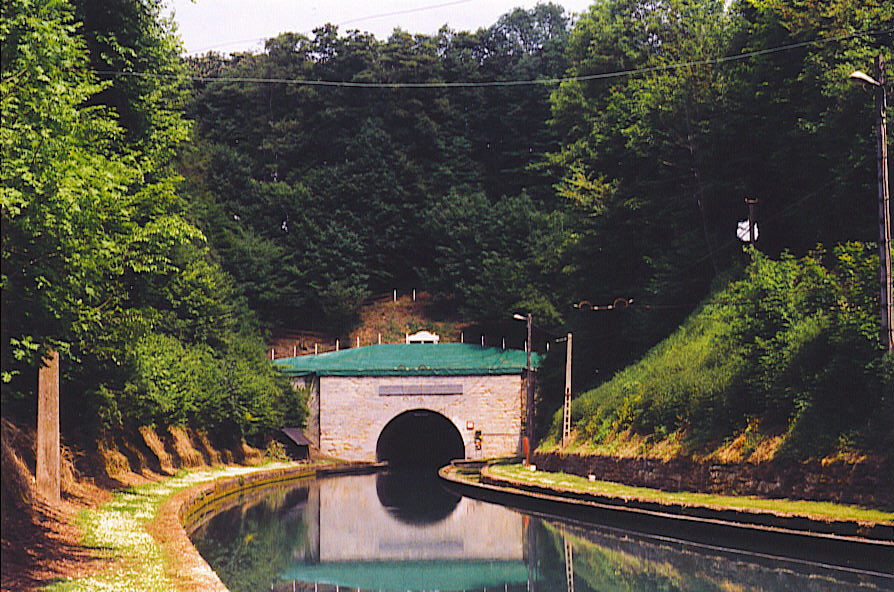
- The south tunnel entrance
- Interactive map of Riqueval Tunnel

Overview
- Location: Ballicourt
- Coordinates: 49.975998°N 3.2311505°E
- Status: Open
- Waterway: Canal de Saint-Quentin
- Start: 49.95061°N 3.235851°E
- End: 50.001386°N 3.22645°E

Operation
- Constructed: 1801-1810
- Opened: 1810
- Owner: Gabarit Freycinet

Technical
- Length: 5,670 metres (3.52 mi)
- Boat-passable: Yes

The Riqueval Tunnel is a 5,670 metres (3.52 mi)-long tunnel on the St. Quentin Canal, close to the commune of Bellicourt, in the department of Aisne, France. It connects Bellicourt with Bony. It was constructed as part of the St Quentin Canal between 1801 and 1810, on the orders of Napoleon.

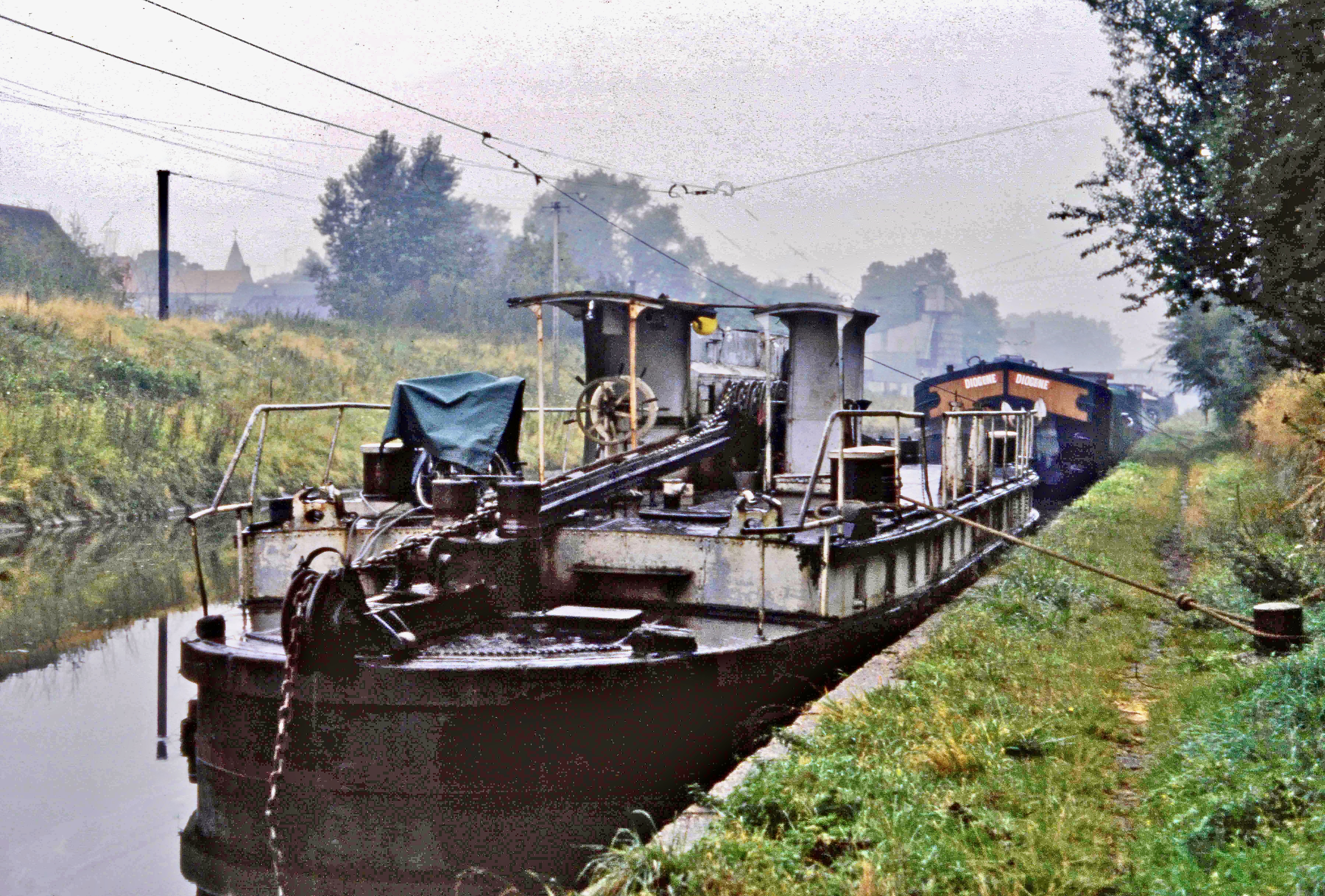
Riqueval Tunnel electric tug in 1984

The tunnel remains in use, and can be traversed using a chain boat. Along with the Mauvages tunnel, on the Marne–Rhine Canal, it is one of the last locations in the world where a system of chain towing is still in operation.

It was the longest tunnel in the world until the construction of Biassa II tunnel, La Spezia, Italy.

Preceded by Wapping Tunnel	Longest tunnel 1810–1864	Succeeded by Biassa II Tunnel
