= Chain boat navigation on the Neckar =

Former means of transportation on a river in Germany

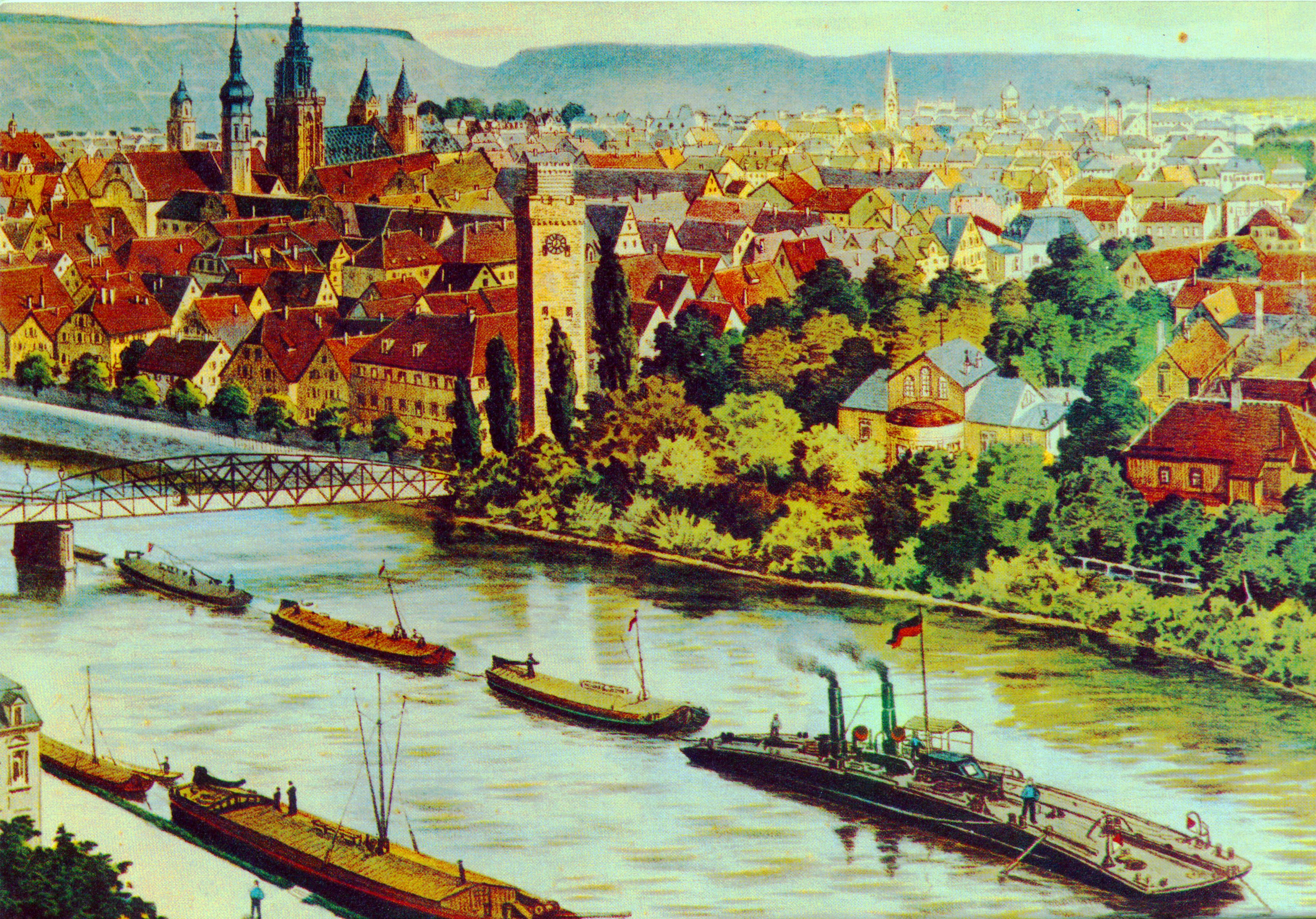
Chain ship on the Neckar near Heilbronn

Chain boat navigation on the Neckar was a special type of tugboat navigation in which chain steamers with several towed barges pulled along a chain laid in the river. It was used from 1878 between Mannheim and Heilbronn and from 1884 as far as Lauffen. Chain shipping considerably reduced the transport costs for skippers compared to the hitherto customary towage by horse, and made ship transport competitive with the railway once again. The progressive canalisation of the Neckar and the barrages required for this made chain towing more difficult and uneconomical. It was increasingly replaced by tugs with propellers, and was discontinued in 1935 with the complete expansion of the Neckar.

== Situation prior to chain shipping ==
=== River ===
The flow conditions of the Neckar varied considerably along its course. On the approximately 113 km long stretch of river from the harbour in Heilbronn to its mouth in the Rhine, sections of the river with a steep gradient of 1:350 alternated with shallow sections with a gradient of only 1:10,000. If sections with a gradient of more than 1:700 are described as rapids, then this applied to around 7 % of the stretch, i.e. around 7840 m. In addition to the difficulties caused by the variation in gradient, there were also strong bends in the course of the river.

The river bed consisted mostly of shell limestone and coloured sandstone; however, there were rock sills in some places along the course of the river. The water levels of the Neckar varied greatly depending on the season and the amount of precipitation. The highest water levels were between 6.6 and 14.6 metres, depending on the section of the river, while the Neckar fell to less than 0.56 metres at low water in summer. In the very dry year of 1865, water levels below 0.56 metres were measured on 210 days, whereas this low level was only reached on one day in 1869. The low water levels significantly hindered ship traffic. In winter, frost also hindered navigation for an average of three weeks.

The flow rate of the water was between one and three metres per second, depending on the gradient and water level in the rapids area. The river conditions were therefore not particularly favourable for the circumstances at the time, but not overly obstructive either.

Map of the Neckar with state borders and railway lines (1882)

=== Transport by ship ===
Until the 18th century, boat transport on the Neckar was traditionally carried out by people pulling their boats uphill from the land on towpaths. The boatmen let their boats drift downstream with the current. With the expansion of transport capacities, ships became larger and larger and shipping was reliant on horse-drawn towage. A typical ship's train consisted of a main ship with a mast, an anchor yacht and an oar yacht. The cargo distributed between the three boats was typically around 120-150 tonnes. The crew consisted of the ship's owner, two sailors and a deckhand. In addition, there were six to ten draught horses harnessed one behind the other, which were ridden by four to five linesmen.

It was possible to cover about 20 kilometres a day in 5 hours, so it took about 5.5 days to cover the distance from Mannheim to Heilbronn. The horses had to be transferred from one bank to the other at five points, and additional horses were needed at certain points. The riders' wages were negotiated individually with the shipowner and varied according to water levels and demand. Operating costs were therefore almost impossible to plan. It was not until 1863 that annual contracts were signed. However, this did not prevent costs from rising steadily. In most cases, the income from the freight barely covered the transport costs. In some cases, the uphill journey was loss-making, and the downhill journey was only marginally profitable.

The main goods transported upstream were coal and colonial goods, while downstream were mainly table and rock salt from the Friedrichshall and Wimpfen saltworks, timber and lumber, stone from the Odenwald quarries and grain. The total volume of goods transported on the Neckar at Heilbronn increased significantly from 25,600 tonnes (1836) to 79,600 tonnes (1854) and around 115,000 tonnes (1872). At the same time, competition from the railways became increasingly fierce. Railway lines were built mainly on the Mannheim-Heidelberg (1840), Heidelberg-Neckargemünd-Meckesheim-Neckarelz-Mosbach (1862), Meckesheim-Rappenau (1868) and Rappenau-Jagstfeld (1869) routes. The railway offered low fares and high speeds. For the boatmen, this meant that their declining incomes were offset by ever-increasing costs, leading to fears that shipping would cease altogether within a few years.

The first attempts to switch to steam were made as early as 1841 with a paddle steamer. However, these failed due to the difficult conditions on the Neckar. The low water level, the narrow bends and the strong current in the area of the numerous rapids made operation impossible or at least unprofitable, depending on the water level.

== Chain boat navigation ==
=== Planning and concession ===
Faced with increasing competition from the railways, the merchants of Heilbronn saw their town's importance as a major freight hub at the end of the navigable Neckar River in jeopardy and sought an economical means of water transport. Without shipping as the only competitor to the railways, price increases would have been inevitable. In addition, the danger of a monopoly on rail transport had become apparent during the Franco-Prussian War (1870-1872). The military use of the railways disrupted civilian land transport, which could only be maintained by shipping.

As a result, the Heilbronn Board of Trade set up a provisional committee in 1872 to introduce chain boat shipping on the Neckar. To analyse the situation on the Neckar, the committee enlisted the help of Ewald Bellingrath, director of chain boat navigation on the Upper Elbe, the road and hydraulic engineering inspector Baurat von Martens from Stuttgart and Max Honsell, a member of the Baden Directorate of Hydraulic and Road Engineering. All three concluded that chain navigation alone, as had been practised on the Elbe since 1866, would be advantageous on the Neckar from a technical and financial point of view. In this technique, chain steamers pull themselves along a steel chain sunk in the river together with an attached tow. Rope navigation, on the other hand, is unsuitable due to the shallow water depth and tight bends.

On 2 October 1872, the committee applied to the Württemberg government for a concession for chain shipping, which then entered into official negotiations with the governments of the other two riparian states, Baden and Hessen. However, when the concession was in sight at the end of 1873, problems arose in raising the necessary share capital. Due to the general economic development of the previous two years, a lot of free capital was tied up in companies and there was little willingness to invest in new projects. For this reason, the committee asked the Württemberg royal family for a subsidy or at least a state guarantee. In a letter of May 1874, the mayor of Heilbronn, Karl Wüst, argued that the future of Heilbronn depended on the preservation of shipping and that the state of Württemberg, as the owner of the salt works and the forest, should also have a clear interest in competitive shipping on the Neckar.

The Guarantee Act of 1 July 1876 provided for the state of Württemberg to issue a state guarantee to a public limited company for the construction of a chain and cable shipping company on the River Neckar. The state guaranteed an annual subsidy of up to 5 per cent of the paid-up share capital for 20 years if the company's annual earnings were insufficient to cover operating costs, and a 5 per cent dividend for shareholders. At the same time, the company undertook to repay previous grants if net profits exceeded 6%. If past subsidies were not to be repaid, the state was to share 50% of the surplus.

In the summer of 1877, a subscription of five per cent shares was established. The city of Heilbronn acquired 500 of the 6,000 shares offered, each with a nominal value of 300 Reichsmarks. After the share capital had been secured, the board of directors of the joint-stock company was elected at the constituent meeting of Schleppschifffahrt auf dem Neckar AG, headed by the businessman Louis Link and Karl Wüst, who had in the meantime been appointed Lord Mayor. In the same year, the company received the 34-year concession from Hesse (27 August), Baden (22 September) and Württemberg (1 November). The content of the identical concessions was in particular the endeavour to prevent one-sided preferential treatment of individual ships. All vessels suitable for towing operations were to be transported in the order in which they were registered. The tariff for the transport was to be determined in consultation with the Ministry. This was divided into a fee for towing the empty barge and a weight-based part for the cargo.

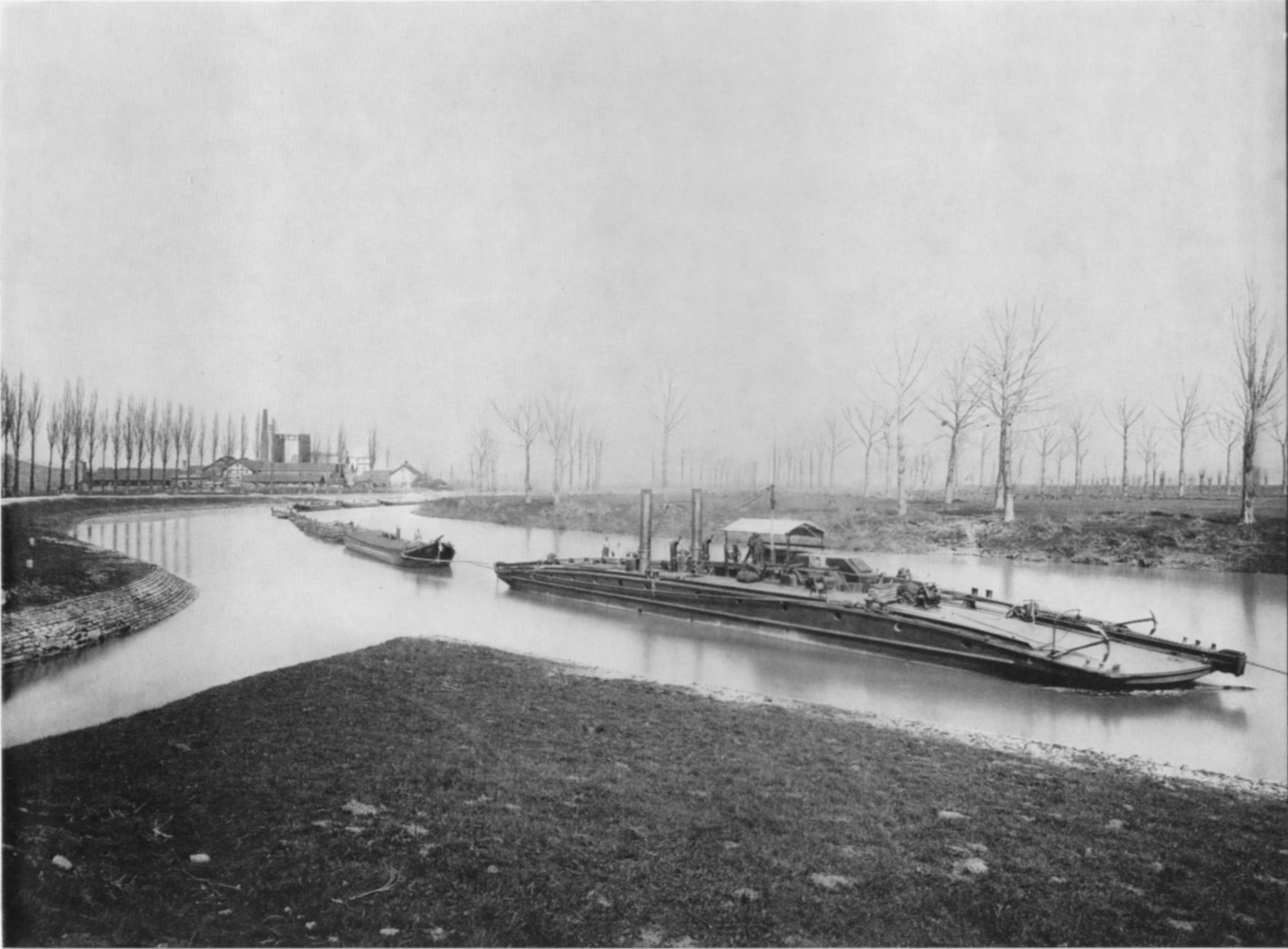
Chain tug with barges on the Neckar near Heilbronn, before 1885

=== Operation ===
On 23 May 1878, a richly-flagged towboat, the Kettenschiff No. I, was waiting at Wimpfen with a train of empty Neckar barges for the probably more than 500 invited guests. Among the guests were Minister of State von Sick and other high-ranking officials and members of parliament from neighbouring states. The next day the steamboat travelled to Mannheim. From there she set off on her first real tow with nine barges attached (total load 360 tonnes) and reached Heilbronn on 27 May. The journey took about half the time of the horse-drawn train. At the same time, the costs were significantly reduced. Shipping became competitive again. On 15 June 1878, King Charles I inspected the equipment and travelled with it from Neckarsulm to Heilbronn. A new chain steamer was put into service in the following months by September. In 1880, the fifth chain steamer was added.

Skippers were quick to embrace the new chain towing service. Between 1878 and 1883, the number of vessels towed and cargo transported increased steadily. By the mid-1880s, upriver traffic on the Neckar had roughly doubled compared to the mid-1870s, despite the opening of the new Neckargemünd-Eberbach-Neckarelz-Jagstfeld (1879) and Jagstfeld-Heilbronn (1882) railway lines, which ran parallel to the river. As the company's income increased, the returns paid to shareholders were between 5.5% and 6.6%. In 1884 there was a slight downturn in shipping. Due to a prolonged, extreme drought, water levels were very low throughout the year, reaching a low of only 45 cm on two occasions. Not only the low rainfall, but also the diversion of water by farmers and the damming up of waterworks at night meant that the tugs had to interrupt their voyages repeatedly due to lack of water. As far as possible, coal and hawsers from the chain steamers were transferred to tenders to reduce the draught. This meant that shipping operations could be maintained down to a minimum water depth of 50 cm.

At all times, the tug company ensured that its prices were competitive with those of the railway, while maintaining its own profitability, so that boatmen could offer their services at competitive prices and still make a reasonable living. For example, it gave discounts to boatmen when water levels were low. The state of Württemberg itself had a vested interest in promoting trade on the Neckar. The income from the trade in Heilbronn, as well as the income from the towing service, went directly to the state of Württemberg. As a result, shipping was favoured at the same cost and the Württemberg State Railway was instructed to transport its coal to Heilbronn by ship. Three steam cranes were specially built by the Heilbronn tugboat company to unload the ships.

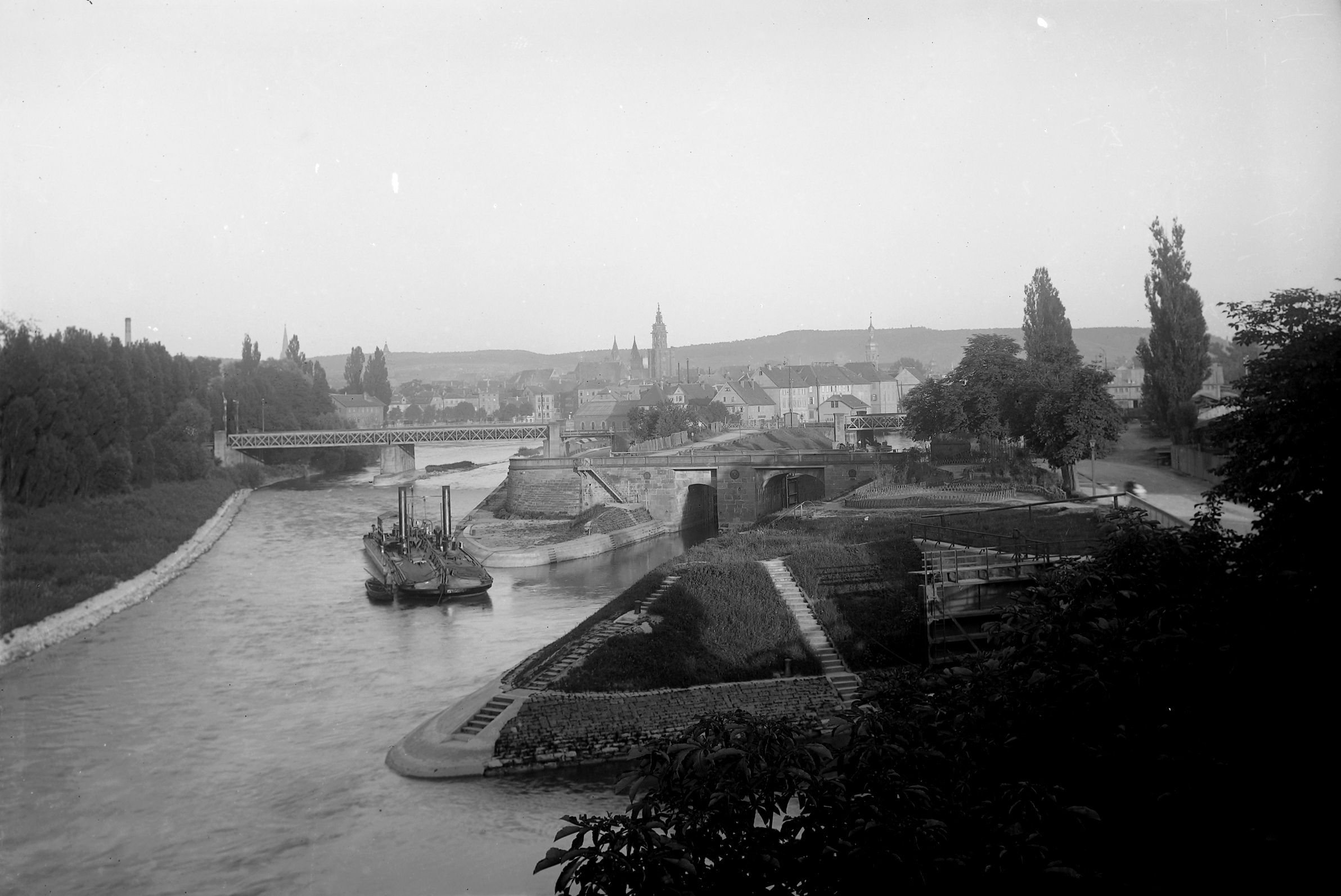
Heilbronn 1920, view to the south-east. On the left an arm of the Neckar, in the centre of the picture the entrance and exit of the Wilhelmskanal, on the right the entrance to the Winterhafen. Railway bridges cross the Neckar arm and the Wilhelms Canal; the buildings on the Neckar island of Hefenweiler can be seen between the Neckar arm and the Wilhelms Canal. A chain ship is moored in front of the entrance to the Wilhelms Canal.

After one chamber of the Wilhelm Canal lock, built in 1821, had been enlarged to 48 metres long and 7 metres wide in 1884 to allow the passage of a chain steamer, chain navigation was extended to 12 kilometres upstream of Heilbronn at the suggestion of the supervisory board of the Lauffen cement works. From a technical point of view, the conditions for this additional stretch were simpler than those for individual sections of the river already used for chain navigation. Financially, the company hoped to generate additional income from the prospect of transporting limestone, coal and coke not only on the new route but also on existing sections. In contrast, the investment costs for operating resources were very low. The required length of chain was already in stock. Wear of the chain links at their contact surfaces resulted in elongation of the chain, which was small per link but significant over the total length of the chain. As a result, sections of chain were repeatedly cut out and stored over the years. In addition, the chain was subjected to increased stress and wear in river sections with very strong currents and tight bends. At the same time, a chain break in these sections would have much greater consequences, so the chain had to be replaced earlier. However, these sections of chain could still be used for the new line with a reduced number of towed vessels. The extension of the line to Lauffen therefore paid for itself without a new government guarantee and was completed in 1890 after the concession was extended.

In 1890, coal accounted for about two-thirds of the upstream cargo (including deliveries to Lauffen). About three quarters of the downstream cargo was salt, about half of which came from the Friedrichshall salt works in Jagstfeld.

In 1892/93, the prolonged drought caused serious problems for shipping on the Neckar. In the first year, navigation had to be partially suspended due to low water levels. As the Rhine was unaffected, goods were loaded directly onto the railway at Mannheim. The situation was even worse in 1893. A lack of rain and the irrigation of crops with river water caused the level of the Neckar to fall even further. The low water level was also used for extensive clearing and river engineering work, so that tugboat transport could only be operated about 60% of the time. As a result, the tugboat company had to call on the state guarantee for the first time.

During the era of chain boat navigation, the average cargo capacity of towed vessels increased significantly. Whereas in 1878 the average maximum load per vessel was 55 tonnes, by 1892/93 it had risen to around 100 tonnes. The 130-tonne limit was exceeded around 1900. However, due to the narrow bends in the river and the seasonal fluctuations in the water level of the Neckar, most vessels remained below 200 tonnes.

== Technical description ==
Engineer Ewald Bellingrath, who had previously been appointed as an adviser to the provisional committee, took charge of all technical matters. He drew up plans, procured equipment and supervised technical implementation. He had the Neckar boatmen trained on his chain boats on the Elbe.

=== Chain ===
The 115 km long drag chain consisted of 26 mm thick, 110 mm long and 70 mm wide oval chain links and was tested for a breaking strength corresponding to 2.5 tonnes. 70 km of chain was supplied by two English factories, 35 km came from France and 7.5 km from a German factory. There was also 2 km of used chain from the Elbe. The chain had a total weight of 1760 tonnes and cost 592,000 Reichsmarks including installation. Laying began on 23 March 1878 in Heilbronn. The end of the chain was anchored in the Neckar above the railway bridge. The chain was subject to constant wear due to friction and the tensile load.

Every 500 metres or so, the chain was fitted with a shackle lock, which allowed the chain to be detached without destroying individual links. The chain had to be replaced every 10 to 15 years, depending on the flow conditions of the river.

In the area of strong river bends, the chain will be pulled slightly towards the inside of the bend during towing. However, the downhill tug can correct the position of the chain in the river bed.

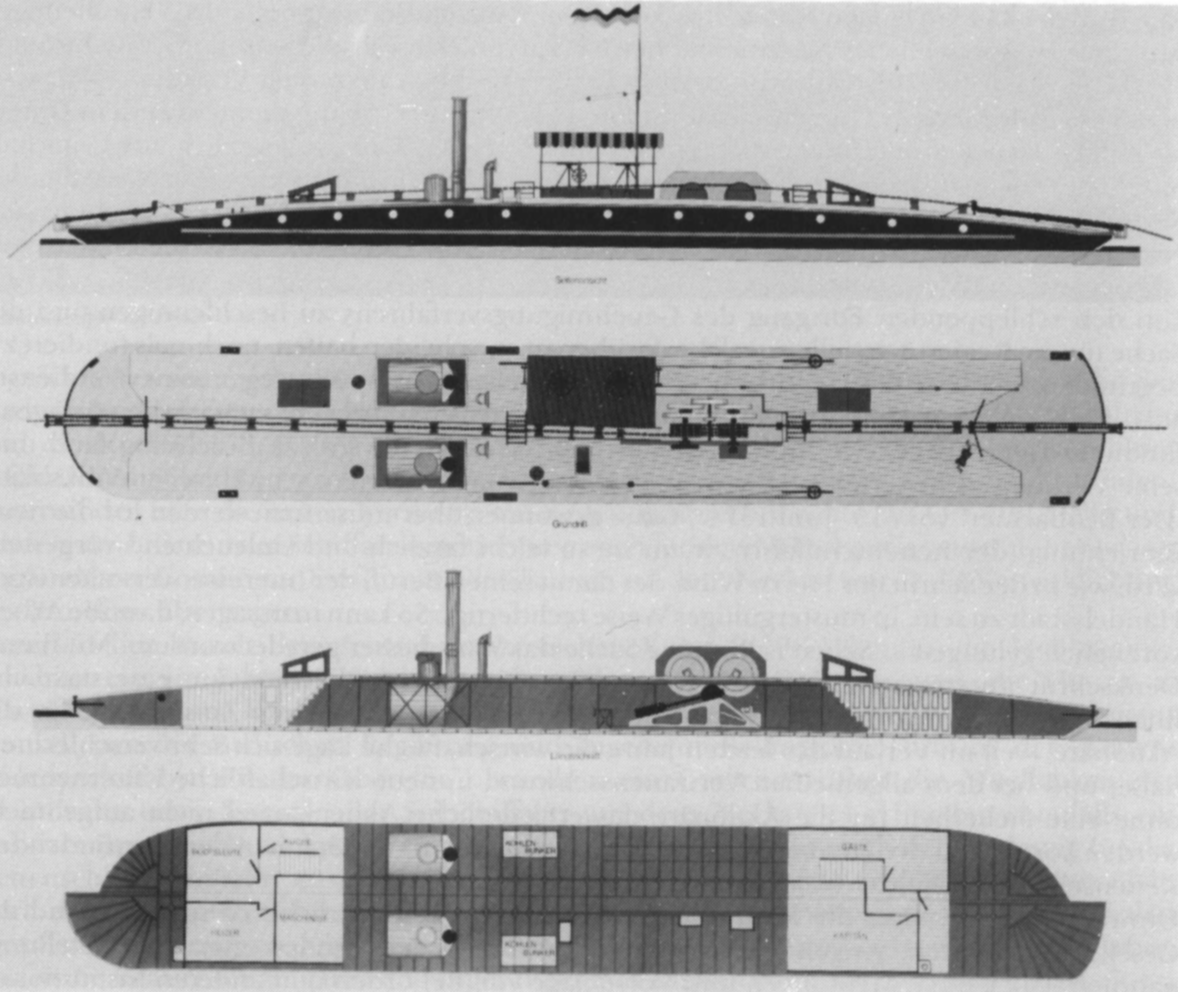
Drawing of a chain steamer from the Neckar in 1878

=== Chain steamers ===
The contract to build the first four chain steamers was awarded to the Sächsische Dampfschiffahrt- und Maschinenbaugesellschaft in Dresden for 69,800 Reichsmark each. However, this company only supplied the boilers and engines, while the hulls were built at the Neckarwerft shipyard in Neckarsulm. The same was true of the identical fifth chain steamer, completed in 1880. The Neckar shipyard was bought by the Schleppschifffahrt auf dem Neckar AG in 1879 for the maintenance of its own equipment. The sixth and seventh chain steamers (1884/85) were designed and built at the Neckarsulm shipyard. Both vessels were fitted with boilers and engines from Maschinenfabrik J. Wolf & Co in Heilbronn.

The chain steamers were largely modelled on the Elbe chain steamers. The chain was pulled out of the water at the bow by movable booms, guided to the actual drive by numerous guide rollers and put back into the water at the stern by another boom.

With a length of 42 to 45 metres and a maximum width of 6.5 metres, the hulls were considerably smaller than those of the Elbe, in order to better follow the narrow bends of the Neckar. The draught of only 47 cm was also adapted to the lower water levels of the Neckar. The hull was only partly made of iron. The deck and the flat bottom of the ship were made of wood, as this was considered to be more stable in the event of an accident.

The chain steamer was divided into three parts by two watertight bulkheads inside, each of which was only accessible from above. In the centre section there were two steam boilers next to each other with the corresponding coal bunkers. The boilers supplied the horizontally arranged twin steam engine with steam. The steam engine with an output of 81 kW (110 hp) was in turn connected via a change gear to the chain winch located above deck and consisting of two drums arranged one behind the other. The chain alternately followed half the circumference of one drum and half the circumference of the other drum. In total, the chain was wrapped around the winch for six half-circumferences. The drums had a diameter of 1.3 metres and were each equipped with four grooves. Two different speeds could be set via the gearbox. The uphill speed was 4.5-5 kilometres per hour and the downhill speed was 10-11 kilometres per hour.

The other two areas, at the bow and stern of the ship, contained the service and mess rooms for the crew. The seven-man crew consisted of the captain, helmsman, engineer, two stokers and two deckhands. On deck was the covered steering position with two steering wheels, from which the two large rudders at the front and rear of the ship were operated. Unlike the chain steamers on other rivers, the Neckar boats could only move along the chain and had no additional drive independent of the chain, such as a propeller, side wheels or water jet drive. While towing ships upstream, they also corrected the position of the chain in the riverbed as they travelled downstream without tow.

When two chain boats met, a complicated evasive manoeuvre was required, with the downstream chain boat leaving the chain and allowing the upstream chain boat to pass. This manoeuvre meant a delay of at least 20 minutes for the towing convoy going up the river, while the ship going down the river lost about 45 minutes.

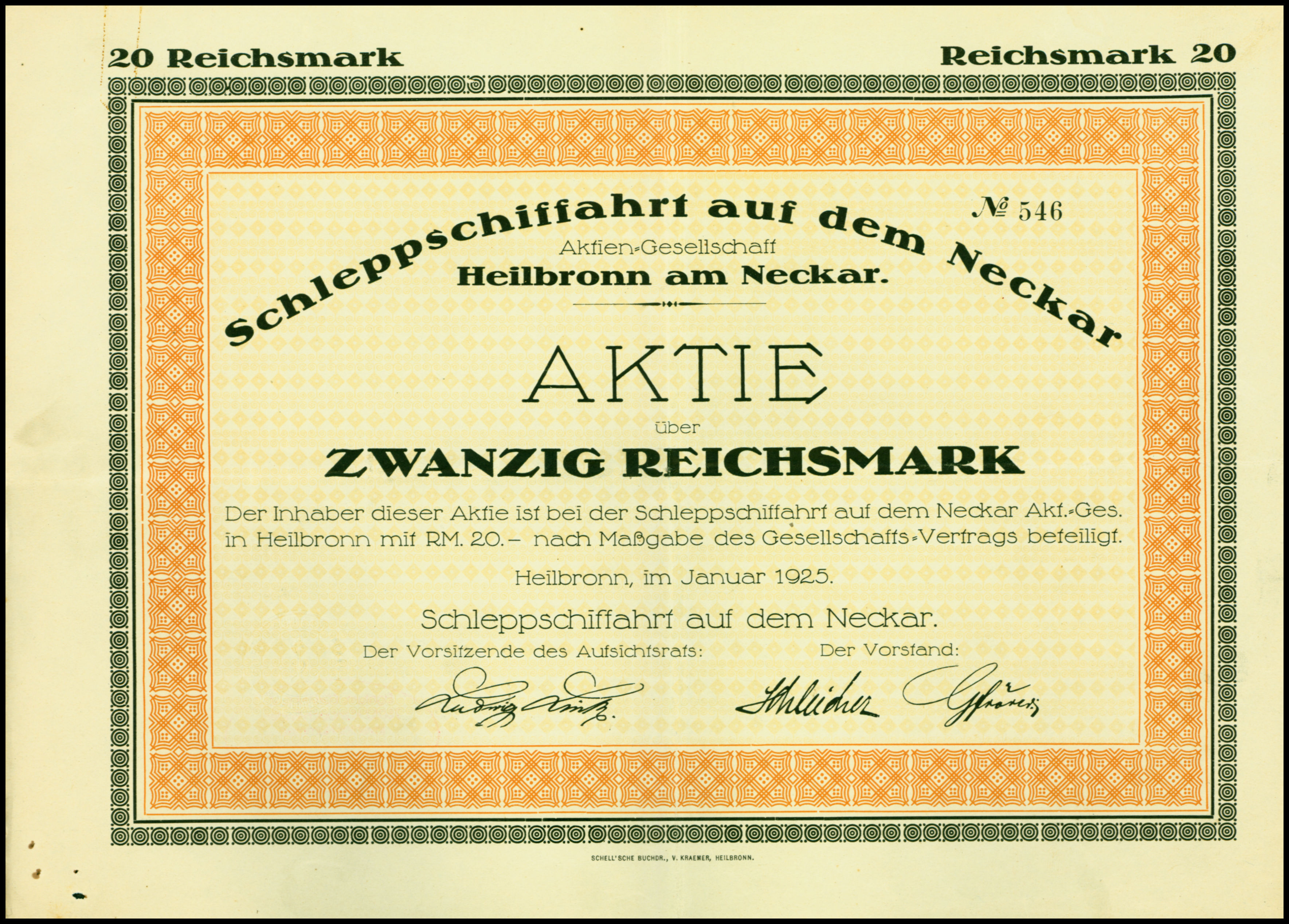
20 Reichsmark share of Schleppschiffahrt auf dem Neckar AG from January 1925

== End of chain navigation ==
The shallow water and narrow bends limited the capacity of most vessels to around 200 tonnes. Only by canalising the river could the use of larger ships with a carrying capacity of up to 600 tonnes be achieved on a sustainable basis. In 1897, interested chambers of commerce and local authorities formed the "Committee for the Improvement of Navigation on the Neckar". This committee not only planned the canalisation, but also considered a major shipping link between the Rhine and the Danube along the Neckar, Rems, Kocher and Brenz rivers. As a result, the Chain boat company's licence, which had been granted until 1911, was only extended for a further 10 years, but additional conditions were added. The chain boat company received compensation for the inconvenience caused by the construction work and the locks. They were also granted the exclusive right to tow on the completed dams.

After the end of the First World War, the Reichswasserstraßenverwaltung began widening the Neckar to allow ships to be 80 metres long, 10.35 metres wide and 2.3 metres deep, corresponding to a carrying capacity of around 1200 tonnes. As the dams were put into operation, the speed of the river was reduced and the depth of the water increased. Both factors made the chain steamers unprofitable compared to other tugs. To replace the two chain steamers, the Schleppschifffahrt auf dem Neckar AG initially used two screw steam tugs on the dammed sections from 1925. These towed the barges not only upstream but also downstream. In the course of the further development of the Neckar, three motor tugs were added by 1929. At the same time, the number of chain steamers was further reduced. The completion of the Great Waterway on 28 July 1935 marked the end of the last chain steamers on the final stretch between Neckargerach and Kochendorf after a total of 57 years.

== Curiosities ==
A humorous historical documentation can be found in Mark Twain, the famous traveller on the Neckar: "It was a tugboat, and one of very curious construction and appearance. I had often watched it from the hotel and wondered how it was propelled, for apparently it had no propeller or paddles. Now it came foaming along, making a lot of noise of various kinds and occasionally increasing it by letting out a hoarse whistle." The transport of heavy loads and the loud whistling earned the chain steamers on the Neckar the nickname "Neckar donkey" among the locals.

When Handschuhsheim was still just a farming village, this story was told: one day, the farmers heard a menacing noise in their fields that sounded like the roar of a lion. Armed with flails and scythes, the farmers set out to catch the lion. But the supposed lion's roar turned out to be the signal of the first steam tugboat (1878) on the Neckar, which greeted the astonished neighbours with its ship's horn. The people of Handschuhsheim have been known as "The Lions" ever since.

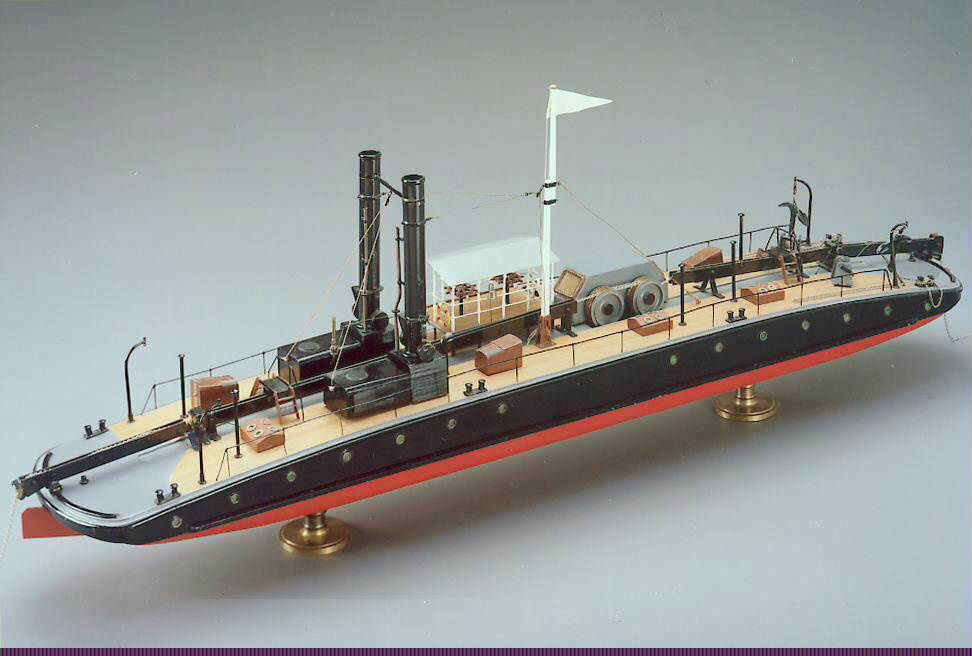
Model chain tug in the Technoseum in Mannheim

== Exhibitions on chain boat navigation on the Neckar ==
The Haus der Stadtgeschichte and the Municipal Museums of Heilbronn are dedicating their exhibition Heilbronn historisch! Development of a City on the River with various exhibits, including part of the original chain of the Neckar chain boat.

The Technoseum (State Museum of Technology and Work in Mannheim) and the Heilbronn Municipal Museums have models of Neckar chain ships.

In the shipping museum of the "Schifferverein Germania Hassmersheim 1912 e. V." there is an approximately 4.5 metre long diorama depicting a chain tow. This originally stood in the shipping museum of the city of Heilbronn.
