= Tunnel of Mauvages =

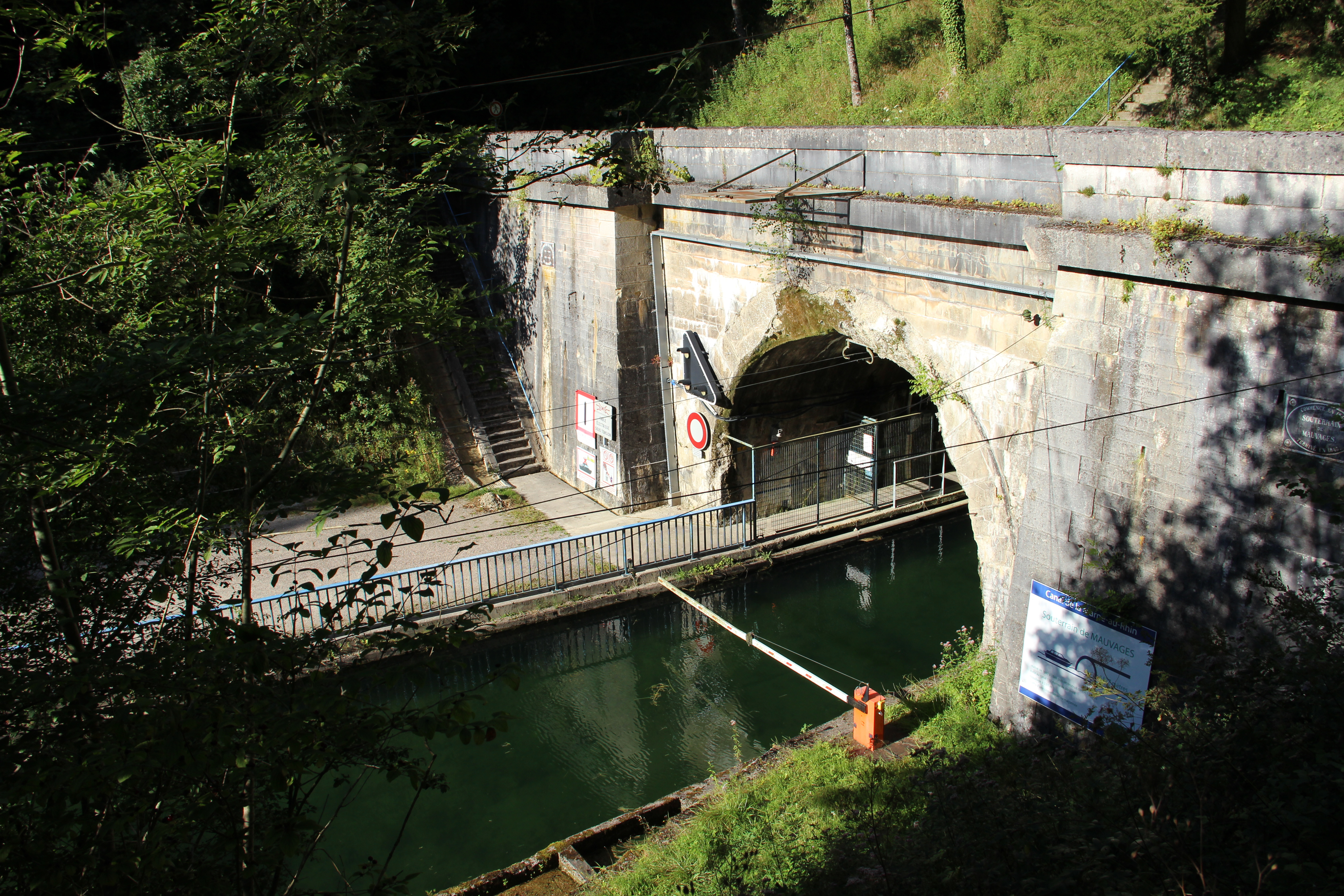
- Entrance to the Tunnel of Mauvages
- Interactive map of Tunnel of Mauvages

Overview
- Start: 86,618 kilometer
- End: 91,496 kilometer

Technical
- Length: 4,877 meters
- Width: 5.3 meters
- Water Depth: 2.6 meters

The Tunnel of Mauvages is a river tunnel on the Marne–Rhine Canal. It is 4,877 meters long and was built from 1841 to 1846 near the city of Mauvages, Meuse department. The tunnel is equipped with a bipolar 600 volt overhead wire for electric vessels .
