= Chain boat navigation =

Upstream hauling of barges by a boat going upstream on a chain in the river

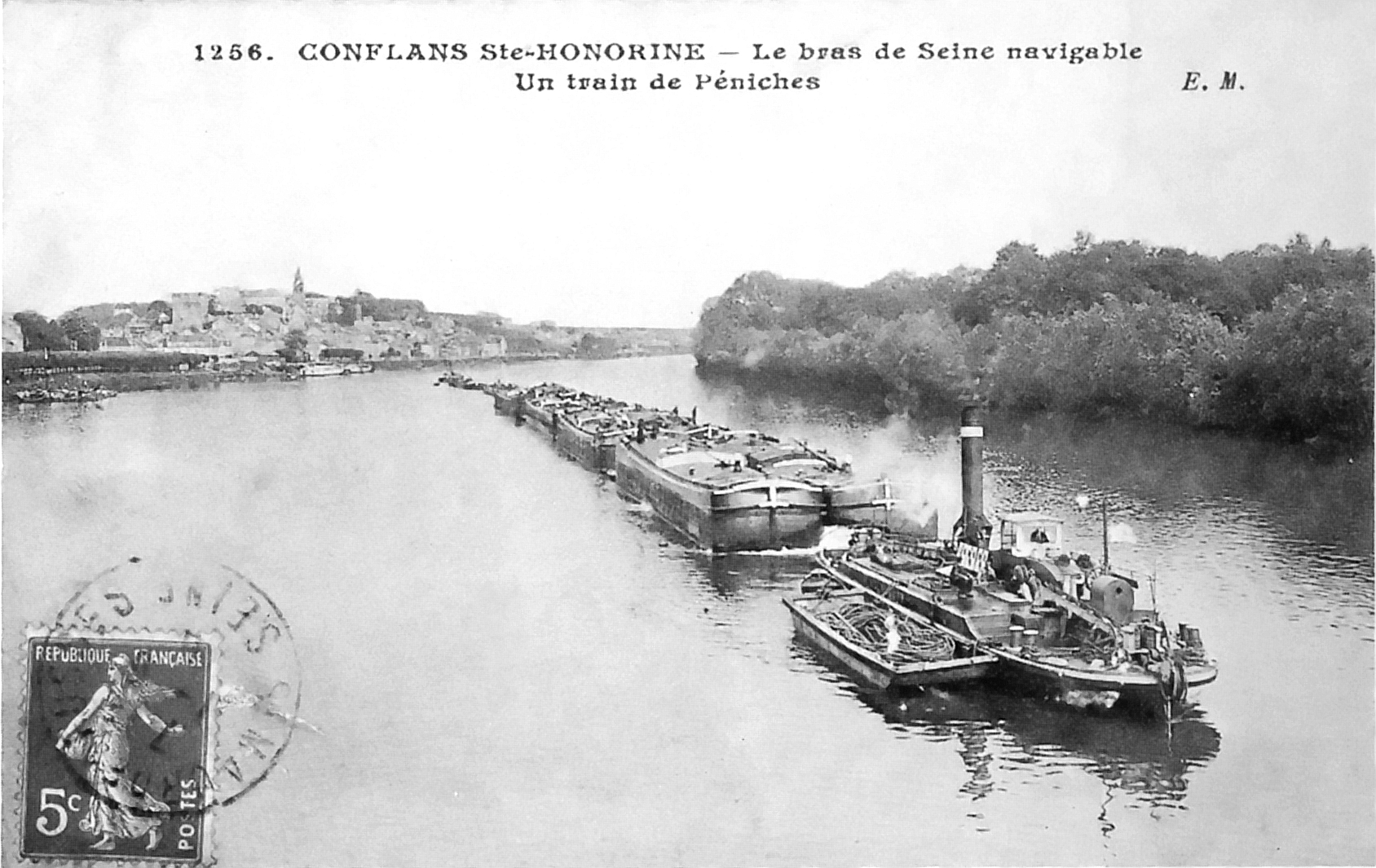
Postcard showing a chain steamer on river Seine in France. The caption reads "Conflans Sainte-Honorine – An arm of the Seine waterway. A train of barges.".

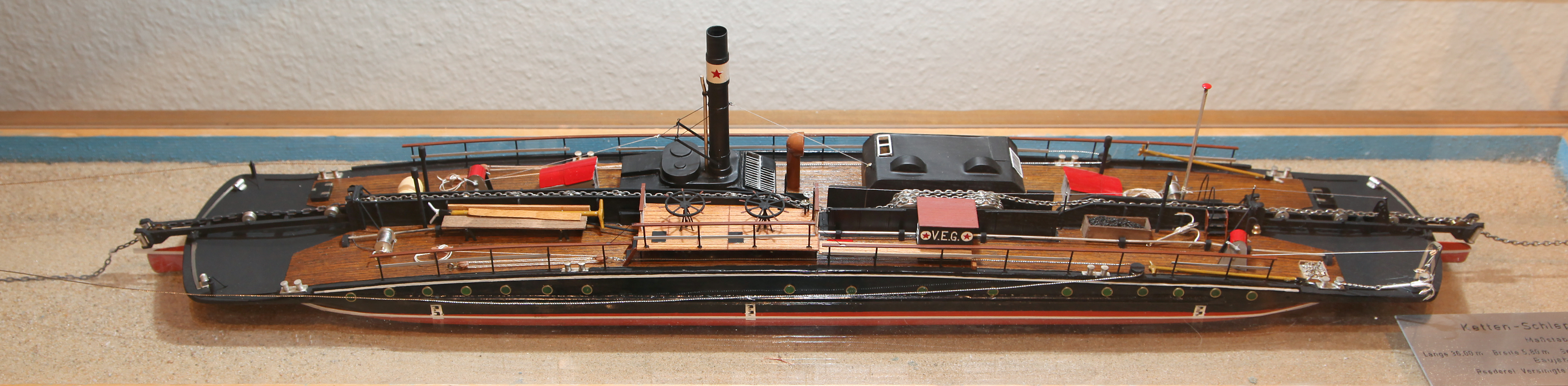
A model of a German chain steamer on the Elbe.

Chain-boat navigation or chain-ship navigation is a little-known chapter in the history of shipping on European rivers. From around the middle of the 19th century, vessels called chain boats were used to haul strings of barges upstream by using a fixed chain lying on the bed of a river. The chain was raised from the riverbed to pass over the deck of the steamer, being hauled by a heavy winch powered by a steam engine. A variety of companies operated chain boat services on rivers such as the Elbe, Rhine, Neckar, Main, Saale, Havel, Spree and Saône as well as other rivers in Belgium and the Netherlands. Chain boats were also used in the United States.

The practice fell out of favour in the early 20th century when steamships with powerful engines and high-pressure boilers – able to overcome the force of the river current – became commonplace.

== Historical development ==
=== Early technical developments before the 19th century ===
The transportation of goods by river in the early days of the chain boat was restricted to wooden ships without their own on-board power. When travelling downstream, boats were either simply propelled along by the current or sails would employ wind power. To move upriver, men or draught animals on towpaths were used to haul the boats on long ropes. In shallow waters boats could also be propelled upstream by long poles. Where towing from a towpath on the riverbank was not possible, a method known as warping was used. These sections of river could be negotiated by anchoring a rope ahead of the boat and then using the crew to haul it upstream.

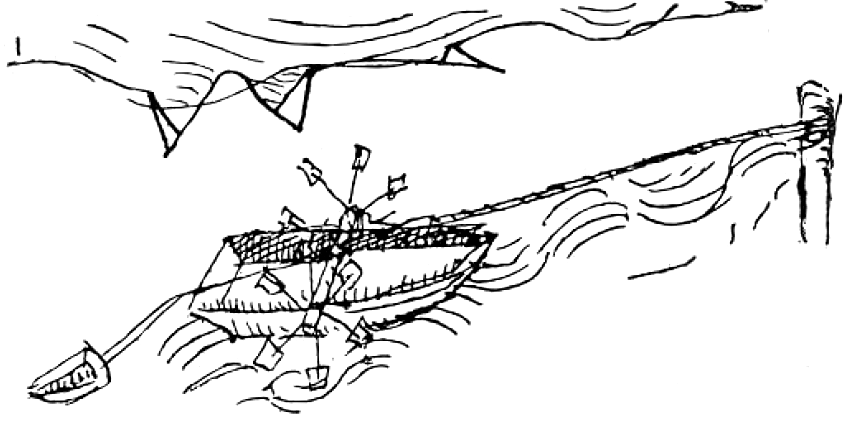
Mariano's concept of ship haulage in his Munich drawing (1438)

In an illuminated manuscript dating to 1438, the Italian engineer, Jacopo Mariano, illustrated the fundamental concept on which chain boat navigation was subsequently based. The boat is pulling itself upstream on a cable laid along the river. The rope is wrapped around a central shaft driven by two, side-mounted water wheels (see upper diagram). Behind the river craft is a small boat-like object being pulled by the current, that is holding the cable taut and thus ensuring the necessary friction on the shaft.

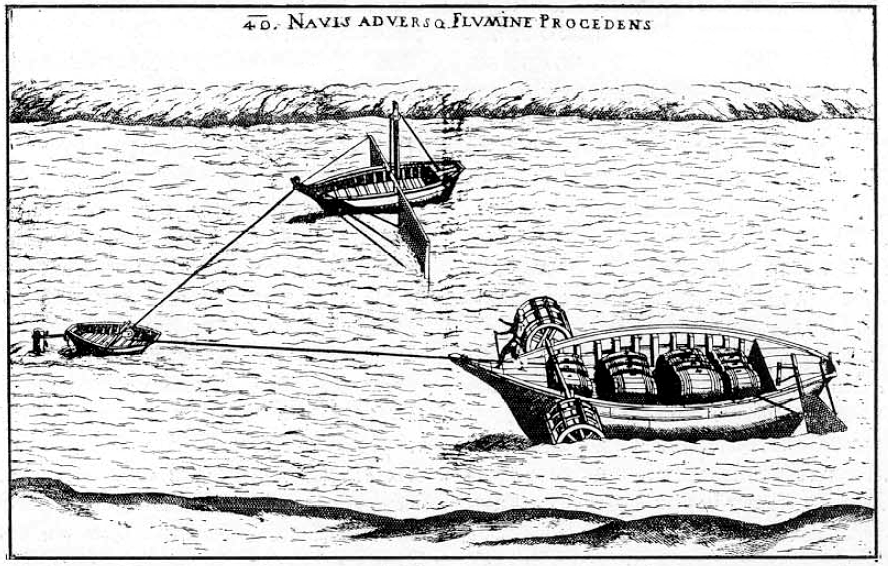
Fausto Veranzio's concept of ship haulage around 1595

In 1595 Fausto Veranzio described a system of cable boat navigation that enabled greater speeds, which also did not need any additional means of propulsion. Two boats are connected by a cable that is led round a pulley anchored firmly to the riverbed. The smaller boat, which is travelling downstream, is moving very fast, driven by the large water sails on either side and is thereby hauling the larger boat upstream against the current. The large barge in the picture has two, side-mounted water wheels that coil up the cable and increase its speed further. It is not, however, recorded whether the system was used in practice.

In 1723 Paul Jacob Marperger, who later became the Electoral Saxon Kommerzienrat described a proposal by mathematics professor, Nicolaus Molwitz from Magdeburg, to use mechanical assistance in order to cope with the fast currents below Magdeburg's bridges. At that time, 50 men were needed to negotiate this section of the river. The idea was to build a 'machine' with two horizontal shafts, the towing cable being turned around the front shaft in such a way that it was continuously being unwound from it again and onto the rear shaft. According to Marperger, with the additional use of levers it should have been possible for five or six men to successfully effect the passage of the boat. At the same time, however, he stressed that the machine was "produced" but "never taken into use". From his description, elements of this basic principle seem to be similar to those subsequently used later in building chain boats. This section of river was later to become the starting point for the first chain boats in Germany.

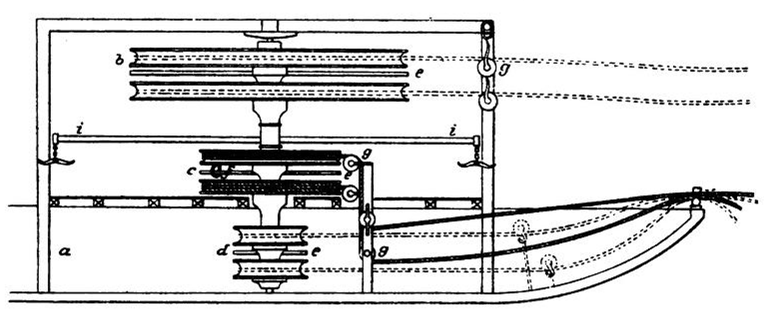
Marshal Maurice of Saxony's cable boat (1732)

The first practical attempts to use a cable boat were in 1732 at the instigation of Marshal Maurice of Saxony, then in French service. These took place on the River Rhine in the vicinity of Strasbourg. Three pairs of cylinders of various diameters were arranged on a horizontal shaft and driven by two horses. Depending on the required force, the rope was hauled in by winding it round one of the pairs of cylinders whilst the other two pairs coasted. The variable ratio allowed for a better utilization of force. Compared with the towing from the land this system could move double the load for the same number of draught horses per craft.

=== Experiments in the first half of the 19th century ===
After 1820 several inventors in France worked separately, but simultaneously, on the technical implementation of boats that could be moved by cables or chains. These included engineers, Tourasse and Courteaut, who conducted experiments on the River Saône near Lyon. They attached a roughly 1-kilometre-long (3,300 ft) towing cable made of hemp to the riverbank. This was wound around a rotating drum on board, which hauled the boat forward. Six horses were used to rotate the drum.

With advancing industrialisation in the 19th century, the demand for transport capacity on the waterways increased markedly. But this industrialisation also revolutionized the methods of transport themselves. The invention of the steam engine meant that, for the first time, a motor was now available to power ships independently of wind and wave. The power of the first steam engines was, however, relatively low whilst, at the same time, they were very heavy. So attempts were made to utilize its power in the most effective way to move ships.

Somewhat later the two engineers, Tourasse and Courteaut, undertook trials on the Rhone between Givors and Lyon using steam power. A steam-driven escort ship transported the 1,000-metre-long (3,300 ft) hemp rope upstream and anchored it to the shore. Then the escort returned and took the bitter end of the rope to the actual tugboat. The latter hauled itself upriver on the rope, passing it to the drum on the escort ship as it went. During this process a second escort ship hurried upstream in order to anchor a second rope and thus save waiting time.

Vinochon de Quémont carried out trials on the River Seine in which the rope was replaced with a chain. The results of the first trials may be read in the 1866 Yearbook of Inventions: Although all these [previous] attempts did not use a continuous chain, rather the tow chain always had to be taken forward by a boat before the ship could be set in motion, the results appeared to be so pleasing that by 1825 under the leadership of Edouard de Rigny a company was formed based on these systems in order to negotiate the River Seine on the section from Rouen to Paris.

The introduction of the entreprise de remorquage failed, however, due to faulty design. The chain steamer, La Dauphine, was not built exactly to the Tourasse's specification. The draught was too great and the engine too underpowered. In addition the shafts were too far aft on the deck. Moreover, the company's capital was insufficient.

In 1826, M.F. Bourdon tested a variant with two steam ships. One of the ships drove forward using a paddle wheel whilst simultaneously uncoiling a rope, 600 metres (2,000 ft) long. After unwinding the rope fully, the ship anchored and hauled the second tugboat with its chain of attached barges up to itself, the rear tugboat assisting the process with its own power. The two boats then changed position and repeated the procedure. However, a lot of time was lost during the anchoring manoeuvre.

From the time of those early attempts in the first half of the 19th century, chain boat technology improved steadily and the first successful use of chain boats in France took place. After that, other French rivers and canals were also provided with chains. In Germany, chains were laid in the Elbe, Neckar, Main, Spree, Havel, Warthe and Danube. In Russia too, chain boat navigation became widespread. In all, about 3,300 kilometres (2,100 mi) of chain were laid in Europe.

=== Changes in chain boat navigation in the second half of the 19th century ===
Chain boats revolutionized inland waterway transport, especially on rivers with strong currents. Compared with the hitherto standard towing method, a chain boat could haul many more and much larger barges. The possible load of a single barge rose five times in just a few years. In addition, the chain boat transport was much faster and cheaper. The number of trips a boat could make increased, for example, on the Elbe almost three times.

Instead of two trips per year, the skipper could annually make six to eight journeys or instead of covering 2,500 kilometres (1,600 mi), his craft could sail up to 8,000 kilometres (5,000 mi) annually. Delivery times were accordingly shorter and more reliable; at the same time reducing costs.

Through the use of the steam engine it was now possible, for the first time, to meet the rising demand for the transport capacity driven by increasing industrialization in the second half of the 19th and first half of the 20th century. Chain boat navigation gave sailors and their barges the opportunity to compete against increasing competition from the railways. Before the introduction of chain boats, paddle steamers were already working as tugs and cargo boats on some stretches of river, but they did not hail a breakthrough in mass transport. Due to its dependence on the water level of the river and on market economic interests, the steamer could not guarantee a regular service. Not until regular services with fast connections, as well as the guaranteed, low transportation costs of the chain boats, could river barge transportation begin to be competitive.

With the development and growth in the use of new forms of power, such as the screw propeller and diesel engine in the first half of the 20th century, self-propelled vessels increasingly superseded the chain boat. The development of river systems and competition from road and rail further reduced the profitability of the chain boat industry that was designed for continuous towing. In time, the use of chain boats became restricted to a few particularly difficult sections of river.

== Distribution in Europe ==
=== France ===
Map of the distribution of chain boat services in France

In 1839, the first technically and economically successful chain steamer, Hercule, was built and on a roughly 5-to-6-kilometre-long (3.1 to 3.7 mi) stretch of fast-flowing water on the River Seine within the city of Paris. It was on this very same section of the river that de Rigny had failed a few years earlier due to technical difficulties.

Starting from Paris in 1854, chain boat services spread upstream to the town of Montereau at the confluence with the Yonne, as well as downstream to Conflans (at the mouth of the Oise). From 1860, services were expanded towards the mouth of the Seine. The maximum total length of the chain in the Seine was 407 kilometres (253 mi). In addition, in 1873 another 93-kilometre-long (58 mi) route on the Yonne itself – between Montereau and Auxerre – was added.

The nature of the riverbed of the Seine offered ideal conditions for chain boats. The river was uniformly deep, had a relatively steep gradient and its bed was sandy and even. By contrast, rivers whose source lay in the Alpine region, were less suitable. This meant that, especially when the rivers were in spate that they carried large amounts of sand with them. In trials carried out on the Rhone, it was found that the chain frequently became buried by sand and stones. Trials on the Saône also failed and were relatively quickly terminated.

The chain boats also provided river transportation on the canals in France, as well as on the rivers. Tunnels on the highest level of these canals were very long and electrically driven chain boats were used to tow boats through them. Due to the lack of ventilation in the tunnel systems, electrically operated chain boats continued to be used even after the introduction of self-propelled motor vessels.

=== Belgium ===
In 1866, in Belgium chain steamers plied the Canal de Willebroek between Brussels and the canal's confluence with the Rupel. Unlike chain boats in France and Germany, chain boats in Belgium used the von Bouquié system, whereby the chain was not led down the centre line of the ship, but simply over a chain wheel at the side of the ship. The chain wheel was fitted with teeth to prevent the chain slipping. Every day about five chain boats operated hauled in each direction, each hauling a chain of 6 to 12 barges.

=== German Empire and Empire of Austria ===
Distribution of chain boat navigation in Germany

==== Elbe and Saale ====
In Germany, chain boat navigation began in 1866 with the laying of an iron chain in the Elbe. The first regular haulage service using a chain steamer took place on a section of the Elbe between Magdeburg-Neustadt and Buckau. The length of this route was about three-quarters of a Prussian mile (a good 7.5 kilometres (4.7 mi) – i.e. the actual length being 5 to 6 kilometres (3.1 to 3.7 mi)). At this point, by the Domfelsen, the river flowed particularly fast. The chain steamer was operated by the Hamburg-Magdeburg Steamship Company.

The first two steamships on the Elbe were 6.7 metres (22 ft) wide and 51.3 metres (168 ft) long and fitted with engines generating about 45 kilowatts (60 hp) motorized, and hauled four barges of up to 250 tons. By 1871, the chain had already been extended from Magdeburg to Schandau on the Bohemian border. Three years later the Hamburg-Magdeburg Steamship Company extended the route northwestwards to Hamburg. Up to 28 chain boats rattled upstream over a total length of 668 kilometres (415 mi). In 1926–27, chain boats were withdrawn from large sections of the Elbe and the chains were lifted. Chain steamers were only used in the most difficult sections. The final section in Bohemia closed in 1948.

On the Saale, chain boats were taken into service in 1873, running from its river mouth to the Calbe, and by 1903 services had been extended to Halle, a total of 105 kilometres (65 mi). The last chain boat on the Saale was still working in 1921.

==== Danube ====
After obtaining a concession to provide chain boat services in 1869, the Danube Steamship Company laid a chain between Vienna and Preßburg (the former name for Bratislava). However, in 1871, some sections of the river were already banning chain shipping. In 1881, chain boats were plying the Danube from Spitz to Linz. There were ten chain ships in use. The chain increasingly broke (on average once per trip) which was the reason why the chain boats were converted in 1890 into tugboats. In 1891, chain boat services were established between Regensburg and Hofkirchen (113 kilometres (70 mi)). In 1896, chain boat services between Vienna and Ybbs ceased and, in 1906, services between Regensburg and Hofkirchen were also terminated.

Due to the strong current on the Danube, chain boats could not use the chain when travelling downstream. They therefore had to have large paddle wheels on their sides, as additional means of propulsion, generating 300–400 horsepower (220–300 kW).

==== Brahe ====
The 15-kilometre-long (9.3 mi) lower Brahe (Polish: Brda) served as a link between the River Vistula and the well-developed network of waterways with Western Europe. This waterway was especially important for the transport of timber, but timber rafts on the Brahe river had to be towed upstream between the mouth of the Vistula and the Bromberg city locks. For many years, horses had been used to tow barges along this 26-metre-wide (85 ft), very winding and relatively fast flowing section of the river. On 12 November 1868, the owner of the Bromberg Haulage Company (Bromberger Treibercomptoir), responsible for towing, applied for a licence for the introduction of a chain boat operation on the lower Brahe to the council in Bromberg.

The concession granted on 3 June 1869 was limited to a period of 25 years and essentially corresponded to the Prussian regulations in force on the Elbe. Shortly thereafter, in the summer of 1869, the first trail run began using a chain steamer built by Maschinenfabrik Buckau. The operation had to be terminated in the autumn, however, as the boat could not deliver the required performance and speed. A replacement boat with sufficient power was introduced in summer 1870. Nevertheless, only one or two trips could be made per day. It was not until the construction of a short cut on the most critical stretch in March 1871, and the acquisition of a second chain boat in spring 1872, that significant number of timber rafts could be hauled by chain boats.

One steamboat gathered the rafts near the mouth of the Brahe and hauled them about a kilometre upstream. It then handed over the 100-metre-long (330 ft) and 7.5-metre-wide (25 ft) rafts to the second steamer for the remaining 14 kilometres (8.7 mi) to the locks at Bromberg. The transport service was profitable and the number of chain boats was increased to four. On 30 April 1894, the Minister of Trade and Industry and the Minister of Public Works extended the concession by another 25 years.

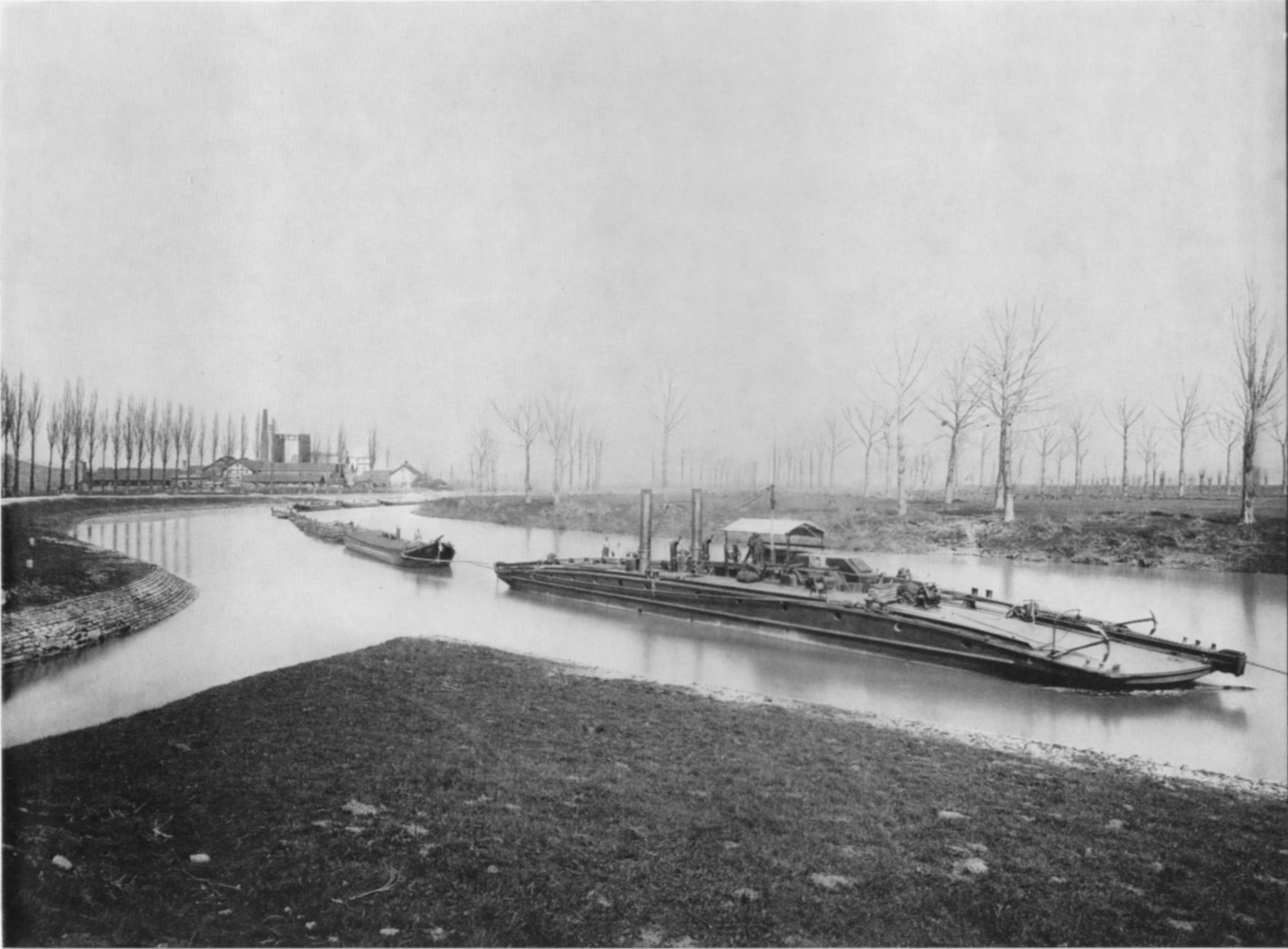
Chain boat barges on the river Neckar in Heilbronn, before 1885

==== Neckar ====
By 1878, the first chain boat had also entered service on the River Neckar between Mannheim and Heilbronn, hauling nine barges. The operation of chains boats was managed by the Chain Ship Company of the Neckar (Kettenschifffahrt auf dem Neckar AG). However, the regulation of the flow of the river by locks in the 1930s, which enabled it to be upgraded into a major waterway, spelt the end of the hitherto still profitable Neckar chain boats and their replacement by large barges.

==== Havel and Spree ====
On the River Havel, too, there was a short period of trials with chain boats. Although the flow of Havel has always been low, nevertheless a large number of laden barges could be towed inexpensively using a chain steamer. On the Havel and Spree rivers, between Pichelsdorf near the city of Spandau and the Crown Prince Bridge (Kronprinzenbrücke), the Unterbaum on the edge of the Berlin, the Berlin Barge Company, founded in 1879 by two Englishmen, opened a chain boat service on 16 June 1882. In the Havelland there were numerous brick factories whose products were transported almost exclusively by ship. In summer 1894, chain boats on the Havel and Spree were withdrawn. The development of the steam-driven tugboat with screw propellers had superseded them.

==== Main ====
Chain boats were also used on the River Main in the period from 1886 to 1936. The chain was laid in the 396-kilometre-long (246 mi) navigable section of the river between Mainz and Bamberg. Up to 8 chain boats were in service on the Main. The chain was recovered from the Main in 1938 and re-used. The chain boats on the Main were also colloquially called the Maakuh or Määkuh ("Main Cow").

=== Russia ===
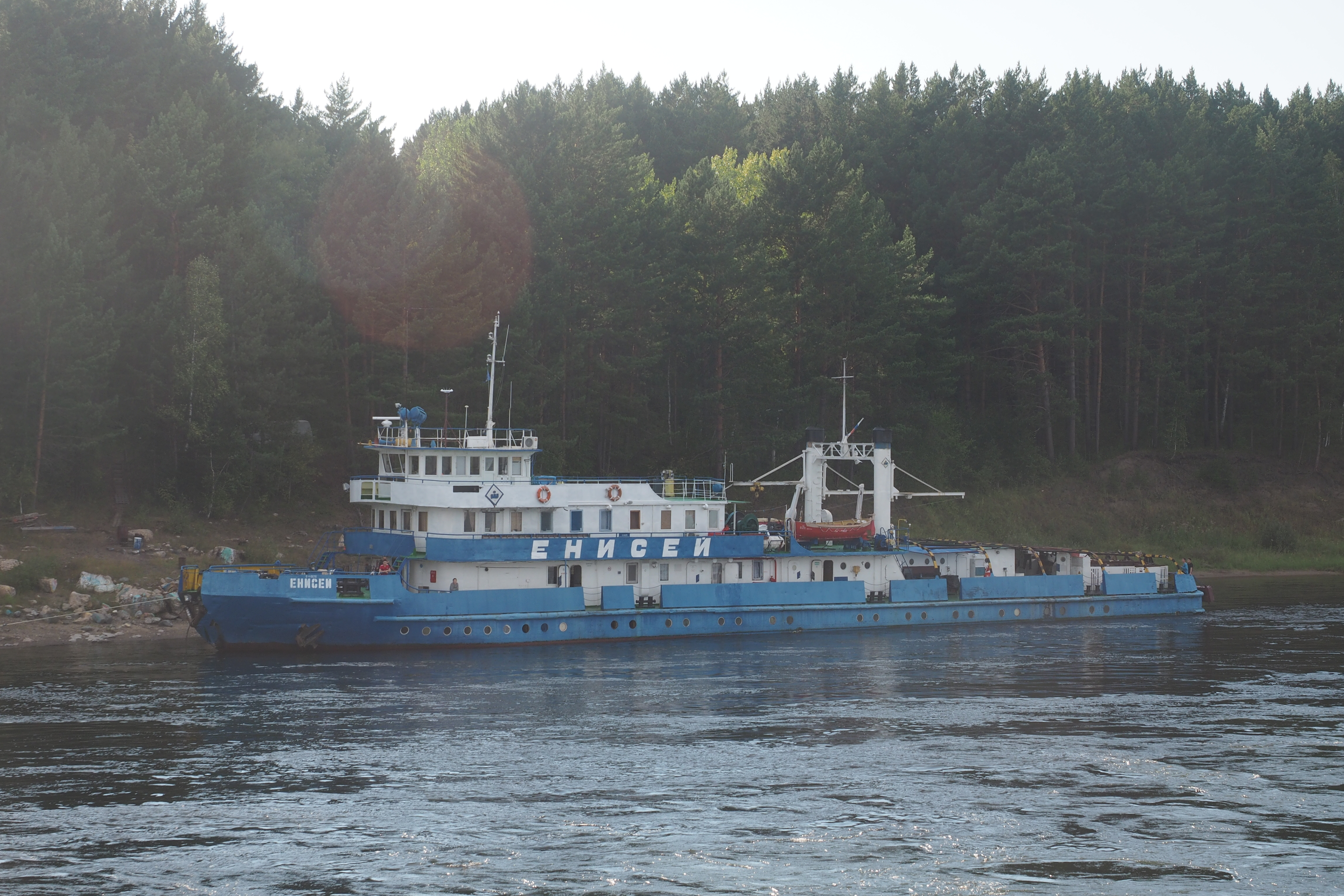
Chain tug Enisei on river Yenisey, Krasnoyarsk kray, Russia

The Volga-Tver Chain Shipping Company launched haulage services on the Upper Volga between Rybinsk and Tver. This stretch of river, approximately 375 kilometres (233 mi) long, was poorly regulated and often only had a depth of 52 centimetres (20 in). Nevertheless, profits achieved were low. In 1885, only 10 chain steamers were operating on the Volga, each with a power of 40 or 60 horsepower (30 or 45 kW).

Chain boat services were also established on the Sheksna in 1871 by the Chain Steamship Company on the Scheksna whose headquarters were in St. Petersburg. The chain extended over a length of 445 kilometres (277 mi) from the river's confluence with the Volga to the city of St. Petersburg. From the start, the chain boat service achieved poor results. Subsequently, the company terminated the chain service on a section of the route approximately 278 kilometres (173 mi) long that had a very slight gradient and replaced it with a tugboat service. On the remaining 167 kilometres (104 mi) section with its strong currents the chain boats made a profit in many years of about 30%. In 1885, the company introduced 14 chain steamers on this stretch, each capable of 40 horsepower (30 kW).

In addition, chain boat services were delivered on the Moskva by 4 steamers of 60 horsepower (45 kW) each, and on the river Svir with 17 steamers and a total of 682 horsepower (509 kW). A project that would link then Russian capital, St.Petersburg with Kotlin island in the Bay of Finald was developed in XIX century, but was abandoned.

As of 2022 the only chain boat still in service in Russian waters is diesel-electric tug Enisei (1964, project# 1111-03) that tows vessel caravans along Kazachinsky rapids on Yenisey river in Siberia.

== Technical description ==
=== Chain boat ===
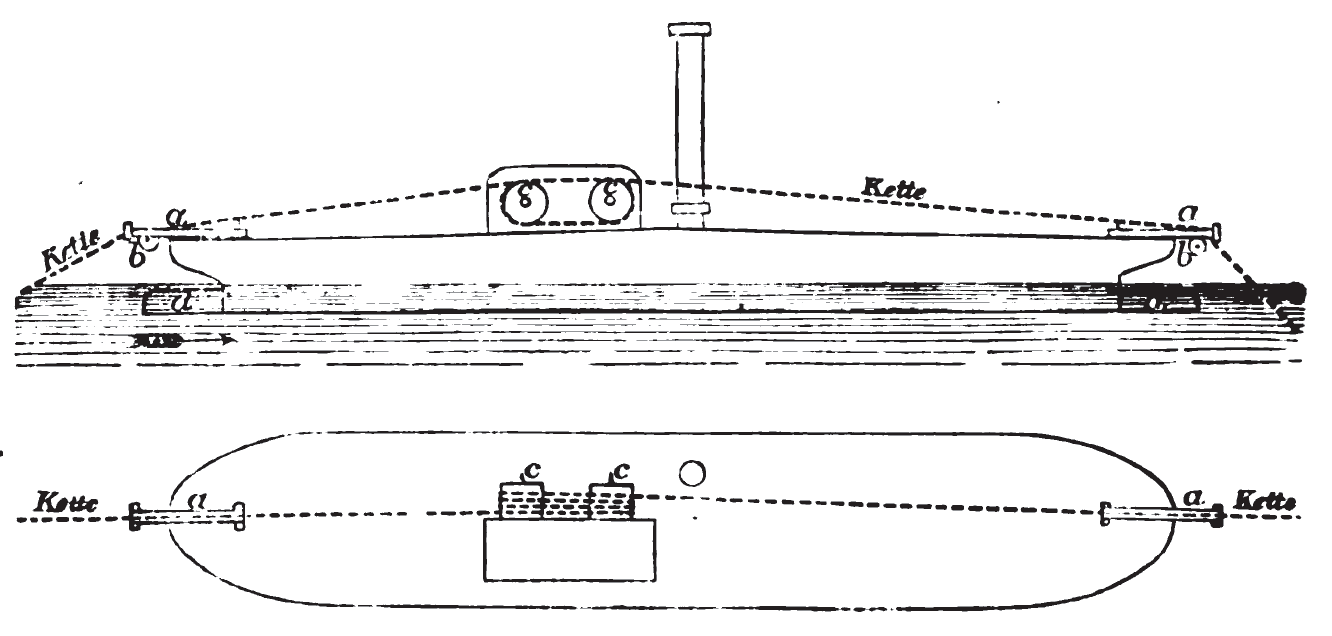
Schematic diagram of a chain boat

The chain boat hauled itself along by means of a chain laid in the river bed. In order to do this, the chain was lifted out of the water by a boom at the bow of the vessel and ran down the deck, following the longitudinal axis of the ship, to the chain drive in the middle. Power was transferred from the steam engine to the chain primarily through a drum winch. From there, the chain was led across the deck to the boom at the stern and back down to the river bed. Due to the lateral movement of the boom and the two rudders mounted at the front and rear, it was possible to relay the chain in the middle of the river again even at river bends.

=== Chain ===
The shackle link (red) used to open the chain

The chain had to be paid for by the chain shipping companies themselves and was made of seamless steel links. The individual links were from good, weldable bars with a low carbon content. Depending on the section of the river the bars had a typical thickness of 18 to 27 millimetres (0.71 to 1.06 in). Despite that, there were frequent breakages. The chain had shackles at an interval of several one hundred metres (three hundred and thirty feet) that could be opened when two chain boats met. Most of these high-quality chains were made in England or France.

=== Encounter between boats travelling in opposite directions ===
If two chain boats met, a complex manoeuvre was necessary in which one boat passed the chain, using an auxiliary chain, to the other boat. This procedure meant a delay of at least 20 minutes for the boat travelling upstream, while the ship heading downstream suffered a delay of about 45 minutes as a result of the manoeuvre. The introduction of auxiliary engines enabled chain boats to travel downstream under their own power without using the chain, thus avoiding the need for these time-consuming operations.

=== Trials with "endless" chains ===
To avoid the large cost of buying a chain or cable, trials were carried out on the Rhône by Dupuy de Lome using an "endless" chain. The boat used its own chain, which was lowered by the forward boom into the water; its weight taking it down to lie on the river bed. At the stern, the chain was pulled up from the water again and hauled forward along the deck of the ship by the chain drive. Assuming that the lower part of the heavy, self-contained chain was unable to slide on the river bed, the ship could move forward. This type of propulsion was never used commercially because sufficient power transfer was only possible if the chain was the right length for the conditions. If the water was too deep, the length of the chain resting on the river bed became too short to generate the required friction. If the water was too shallow, the length of chain in the river became too great, and would not stretch out but lie in coils on the bottom. So variations in river depth complicated the handling of the vessel considerably.

== Concessions ==
Chain shipping companies required a licence to operate chain boats. This concession guaranteed the company the sole right for this type of ship transport. Since the purchase of the chain and the chain boats represented a high financial burden for the operator, the concession had to offer some degree of security. But this did not eliminate competition from the railways, from paddle steamers or from normal towed barges. In return, the rights and obligations of the mariners were regulated in the concession. For example, every barge had to be transported at rates set by the state.

== Comparison with paddle steamers ==
Chain boats not only had to face competition with the railways, but also on the waterways themselves. Compared with paddle steamers, chain steamers had advantages anywhere where the conditions were difficult for navigation, such as rapids, sharp bends in the river and shoals.

=== Currents and flow velocity ===
On a paddle wheel or screw steamer, water is pushed backwards in order to move it forward. A significant part of the energy is converted into turbulence and so is not available for the propulsion of the ship. The chain steamer, however, pulls forward on a solid chain and so can turn a much larger proportion of its steam power into thrust. For the same tractive force, it reduced coal consumption by about two thirds.

At faster river flow rates, the advantage shifts more and more in favour of the chain steamer. In 1892, Ewald Bellingrath introduced the following general rule: at an average river gradient of 0.25‰ paddle steamers are superior. Between 0.25‰ and 0.3‰ both types of craft are equivalent. Above 0.3‰ the chain boat has the advantage. On gradients above 0.4‰ paddle steamers find it increasingly difficult to make headway and from 0.5‰ are completely unable to haul barges.

Practical experience showed that free-running, paddle tugboats capable of 400 horsepower (300 kW) could achieve a speed of about 3 metres per second (11 km/h; 6.7 mph) against a river current of 0.5 metres per second (1.8 km/h; 1.1 mph). Thus they could provide a commercially viable service in currents of up to 2 metres per second (7.2 km/h; 4.5 mph). Even larger gradients could be negotiated if they were only over a short distance. By slackening the tow ropes, paddle steamers could overcome the obstacle. By the time the attached barges entered the faster-flowing area, the steamer had already sailed past it and was able to generate its full traction again. At flow rates above 3 metres per second (11 km/h; 6.7 mph), the power output would drop to zero. Many of the steeper sections of river were relatively short and could be overcome by paddle steamers using the manoeuvre described.

However, fast currents when rivers were in spate could also be problematic for chain boats. Movement or deposition of sediment or gravel could bury the chain. A river bed with a large number of ledges or large boulders – such as on some sections of the Danube – caused the chain to become snagged and was a major hindrance to chain boats.

The water churned up by paddle steamers also resulted in significantly greater wave action, which led to a risk of increased shore damage. The additional currents and waves they generated also caused extra resistance for the towed barges. Behind a chain boat, by contrast, the water was calm.

=== Depth ===
Some chain boats had a shallow draft of just 40–50 centimetres (16–20 in) designed for use in very low water levels and thus adapted to the circumstances of many rivers of the time. Even at a depth of 57 centimetres (22 in) it was still possible to operate an effective service on the Neckar. Steamers, however, required significantly greater depths of 70–75 centimetres (28–30 in) to operate commercially. Moreover, in strong currents, the minimum water depth for steamers was greater. Tugboats with screw propulsion also need a greater water depths to be able to work effectively. Only a propeller that is deep under the water, can produce sufficient propulsion.

Chain ships not only had a shallow draft; but their technical principle was also advantageous for low levels of water: in shallow waters, the chain rises at a shallow angle and a very high proportion of steam power could be converted into thrust. If the water depth was very high, it increased the proportion of energy needed to lifting the chain. The chain's weight exerted a force that was directed obliquely downwards and the efficiency decreased. In addition, maneuverability reduced with increasing depth.

=== Investment costs ===
The chain itself entailed high investment costs for the shipping company. On the 200-kilometre-long (120 mi) section of the Main river, between Aschaffenburg and Kitzingen it is estimated that the cost of the first chain, including laying, was over one million marks. This corresponded almost exactly to the total price for the eight chain boats that were to be used on that section. The chain had to be continually maintained and had to be renewed approximately every 5 to 10 years.

In addition to the cost of the chain was the cost of the conversion of ferries that, on this route, came to about 300,000 marks. This conversion was necessary because the chain used by the chain boats and the cables used by the ferries were not allowed to cross. So the usual cable ferries had to be converted into reaction ferries.

=== Flexibility ===
The first chain ships could only operate when attached to the chain; that is, they used the chain when travelling both upstream and downstream. When two chain boats travelling in opposite directions met, they had to carry out special passing manoeuvres, which resulted in a major loss of time. On the 130-kilometre-long (81 mi) Neckar river with seven chain boats that meant six passing manoeuvres costing at least five hours for those travelling downstream. In order to avoid this time-consuming operation, barges on certain stretches of river in France passed the chain of barges from one chain steamer to another. Such a transfer, however, also took up a significant amount of time.

Barges were normally only towed upstream. When travelling downstream the barges were usually just allowed to drift with the current in order to save money, In strong currents, operating a long string of barges was quite dangerous. Should a chain boat be forced to stop suddenly (for example, if the chain broke), there was a serious risk that following ships would run into it and thus cause an accident.

In the early days of the chain boat, paddle steamers were slower at making their way upstream that chain boats. When heading downstream, however, they were faster and could also haul barges with them.

In addition to the technical limitations of chain boats, their owners were constrained by licence rules, which, for example, laid down the order of the movement and transport fees. They were not therefore as flexible in responding to supply and demand as the paddle steamer companies.

== Decline ==
One reason for the demise of chain boats was the improvement in the technical performance of the new paddle steamers. They were able to deliver greater traction for lower coal consumption. The compound engine on the paddle steamer, based on its power output, needed only about half the amount of coal. Chain steamers were not able to take advantage of these compound steam engines because of their uneven operation. At the same time, chain shipping companies suffered from high investment and maintenance costs.

Another reason for their demise was the canalization of rivers. On the Elbe a lot of current regulating work had been carried out, which evened out the gradient, reduced bends in the river and removed the shallows. As a result, the advantages of chain ship were reduced.

On the Main and Neckar, numerous dams and locks were also added, which created artificial barriers for the chain boats. The damming of the river increased water depths and reduced flow rates. In particular, long strings of barges had to be divided at the locks and fed through individually, causing a considerable loss of time.

== Chain boats in literature ==
Mark Twain, the American author, gave a humorous, historic account of encountering chain boats on the River Neckar in Germany. He describes the event as follows:

Toward noon we heard the inspiriting cry,—

"Sail ho!"

"Where away?" shouted the captain.

"Three points off the weather bow!"

We ran forward to see the vessel. It proved to be a steamboat—for they had begun to run a steamer up the Neckar, for the first time in May. She was a tug, and one of a very peculiar build and aspect. I had often watched her from the hotel, and wondered how she propelled herself, for apparently she had no propeller or paddles. She came churning along, now, making a deal of noise of one kind or another, and aggravating it every now and then by blowing a hoarse whistle. She had nine keel-boats hitched on behind and following after her in a long, slender rank. We met her in a narrow place, between dikes, and there was hardly room for us both in the cramped passage. As she went grinding and groaning by, we perceived the secret of her moving impulse. She did not drive herself up the river with paddles or propeller, she pulled herself by hauling on a great chain. This chain is laid in the bed of the river and is only fastened at the two ends. It is seventy miles [one hundred and ten kilometres] long. It comes in over the boat's bow, passes around a drum, and is payed out astern. She pulls on that chain, and so drags herself up the river or down it. She has neither bow or stern, strictly speaking, for she has a long-bladed rudder on each end and she never turns around. She uses both rudders all the time, and they are powerful enough to enable her to turn to the right or the left and steer around curves, in spite of the strong resistance of the chain. I would not have believed that that impossible thing could be done; but I saw it done, and therefore I know that there is one impossible thing which CAN be done. What miracle will man attempt next?

— Mark Twain, A Tramp Abroad

== See also ==
- Cable ferry

== Literature ==
- Le Sueur, Bernard. Le Touage: Histoire et technique, Association des Amis du Musée de la Batellerie (Conflans-Sainte-Honorine 1994), 180pp ISSN 0753-4167
- Scholl, Lars U. Als die Hexen Schiffe schleppten: Die Gesichte der Ketten- und Seilschleppschiffahrt auf dem Rhein (tr When the witches towed ships: the history of chain and rope towage on the Rhine), Ernst Kabel Verlag (Hamburg 1985), 58pp ISBN 3-8225-0006-2
- Kettenschifffahrt definition in Schifffahrts-Lexikon, by J. Friedrichson, p. 149. Retrieved 1 Mar 2014.
- Preble George Henry: A Chronological History of the Origin and Development of Steam Navigation; 2009 page 268, ISBN 978-1-113-19107-6
