= Oldtimer Museum Rügen =

Transport museum in Germany

Coordinates: 54°26′35″N 13°34′6″E

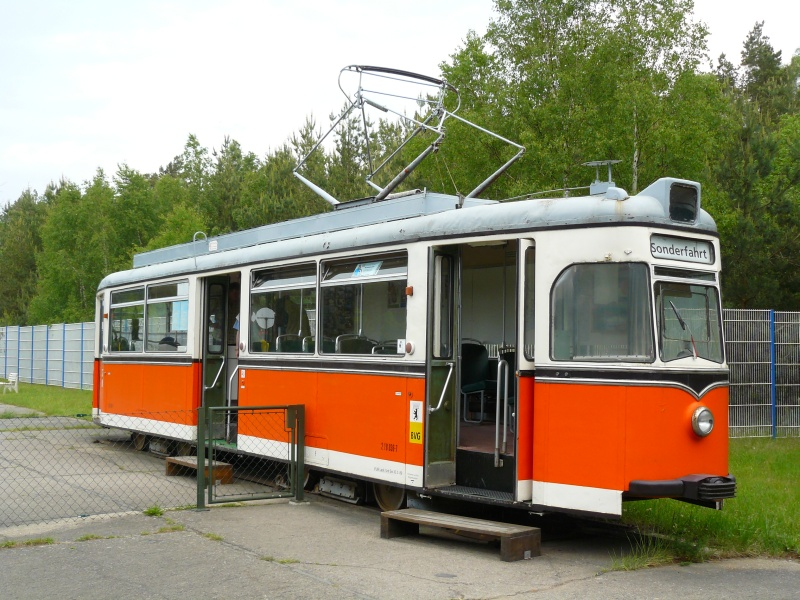
The former Berlin tram used as a ticket counter

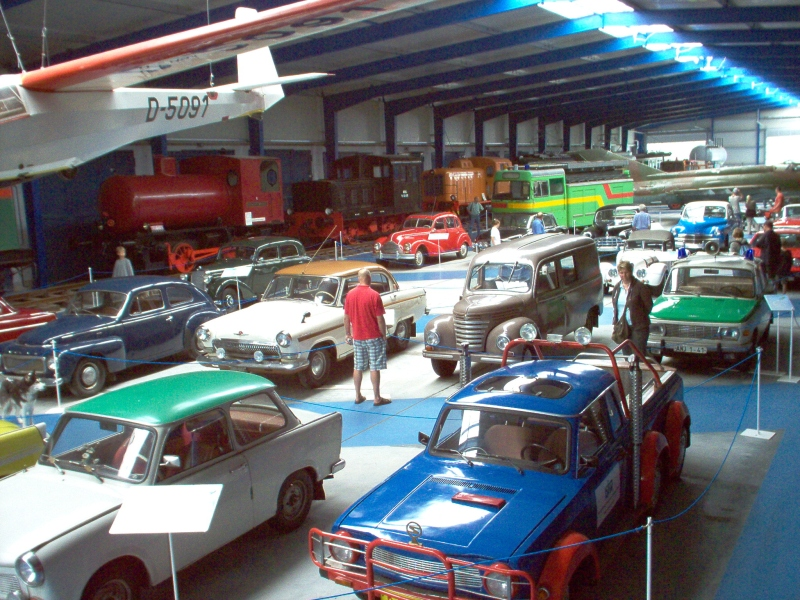
Inside the Rügen Railway & Technology Museum

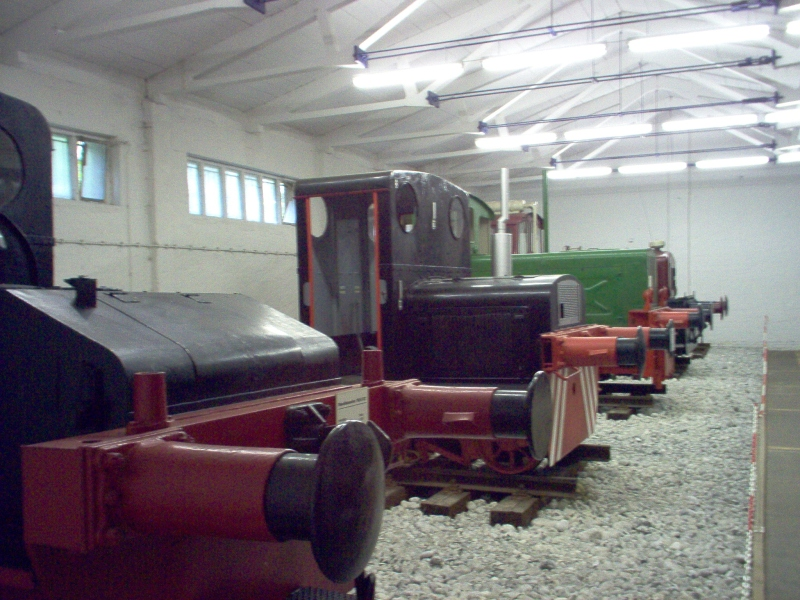
Narrow gauge locomotives in the Rügen Railway & Technology Museum

Oldtimer Museum Rügen

The Oldtimer Museum Rügen (formerly the Rügen Railway and Technology Museum—Eisenbahn & Technik Museum Rügen or ETM) is a German railway museum based on the Baltic Sea island resort of Rügen in the state of Mecklenburg-Western Pomerania, Germany. It was established in 1994 and is housed in the museum section of the Nazi-built Kraft durch Freude ('strength through joy') building complex at Prora which is a protected monument.

In the vicinity of the station, in a 4000 m^{2} hall and in the open air, the following may be visited:

- Locomotives and other exhibits, especially those of the Deutsche Reichsbahn, but also other railway administrations:
  - DRG Class 03 – no. 03 193 with streamlining made at the Reichsbahnausbesserungswerk Meiningen. The locomotive is now displayed with running number 03 002
  - DR Class 23.10 – no. 23 1021 (later 35 1021-1)
  - DRG Class 44 – no. 44 397 (later 44 0397-8 when oil-fired, 44 2397-6 when coal-fired)
  - DR Class 50.35-37 – no. 50 3703 (rebuilt from 50 877)
  - DR Class 52.80 – no. 52 8190-2 (rebuilt from 52 2887)
  - ÖBB Class 1018 – no. 1018.04 as E18 208
  - SDZ class P36 - Soviet steam locomotive P36-123
  - Culemeyer heavy trailer with a Kaelble tractor
  - Steam-driven rotary snow plough
- Cars (not just East German makes)
- Lorries
- Fire engines, e.g. by Magirus Deutz and IFA
- Tractors

== See also ==
- List of preserved steam locomotives in Germany
- Rügensche Kleinbahn
