= DRB Class 50 =

Class of 3164 German 2-10-0 locomotives

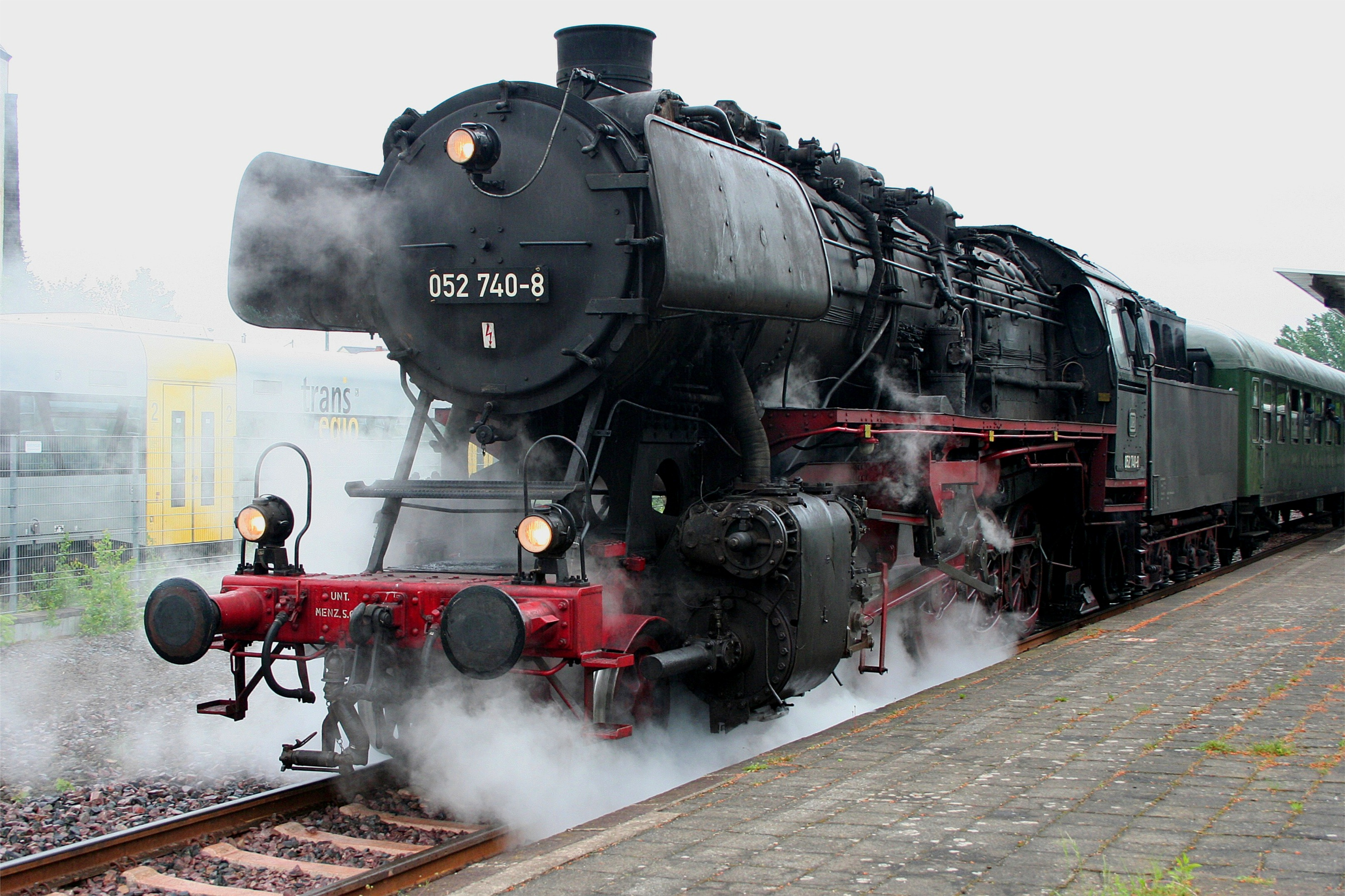
- Deutsche Bundesbahn (DB) 052 740-8 in Mayen, May 2006
Type and origin
- Power type: Steam
- Builder: Henschel & Sohn (650); Berliner Maschinenbau (370); Lokomotivfabrik Floridsdorf (368); Krupp (324); Krauss-Maffei (317); Borsig (179); Maschienenbau und Bahnbedarf AG (170); Schichau-Werke (135); Arnold Jung Lokomotivfabrik (105); Maschinenfabrik Esslingen (69); Škoda Works (140); ČKD (35); Deutsche Waffen- und Munitionsfabriken (72); Ostrowiece (26); SA des Usines Métallurgiques du Hainaut (24); SA la Métallurgique, Tubize (38); John Cockerill (42); Ateliers de construction de La Meuse (26); Forges Usines et Fonderies Haine-Saint-Pierre (28); Anglo-Franco-Belge (26); SA l'Énergie (16)
- Build date: 1939–1948
- Total produced: 3160
Specifications
- Configuration
  - Whyte: 2-10-0
  - UIC: 1′E h2
  - German: G 56.15
- Gauge: 1,435 mm (4 ft 8 1/2 in)
- Leading dia.: 850 mm (33 1/2 in)
- Driver dia.: 1,400 mm (55 1/8 in)
- Tender wheels: 1,000 mm (39 3/8 in)
- Wheelbase
  - Axle spacing (Asymmetrical): 2,600 mm (8 ft 6 3/8 in) +; 1,650 mm (5 ft 5 in) +; 1,650 mm (5 ft 5 in) +; 1,650 mm (5 ft 5 in) +; 1,650 mm (5 ft 5 in) =
  - Engine: 9,200 mm (30 ft 2 1/4 in)
  - Tender: 1,900 mm (6 ft 2 3/4 in) +; 1,900 mm (6 ft 2 3/4 in) +; 1,900 mm (6 ft 2 3/4 in) =; 5,700 mm (18 ft 8 3/8 in)
  - incl. tender: 18,890 mm (61 ft 11 3/4 in)
- Length
  - Over headstocks: 21,640 mm (71 ft 0 in)
  - Over buffers: 22,940 mm (75 ft 3 1/8 in)
- Height: 4,500 mm (14 ft 9 1/8 in)
- Axle load: 15.3 t (15.1 long tons; 16.9 short tons)
- Adhesive weight: 76.6 t (75.4 long tons; 84.4 short tons)
- Empty weight: 78.6 t (77.4 long tons; 86.6 short tons)
- Service weight: 88.1 t (86.7 long tons; 97.1 short tons)
- Tender type: 2′2′ T 26
- Fuel type: Coal
- Fuel capacity: 8 t (7.9 long tons; 8.8 short tons)
- Water cap.: 26 m^{3} (5,720 imp gal; 6,870 US gal)
- Firebox
  - Grate area: 3.9 m^{2} (42 sq ft)
- Boiler
  - Pitch: 3,050 mm (10 ft 1/8 in)
  - Tube plates: 5,200 mm (17 ft 3/4 in)
  - Small tubes: 54 mm (2 1/8 in), 113 off
  - Large tubes: 133 mm (5 1/4 in), 35 off
- Boiler pressure: 16 bar (16.3 kgf/cm^{2}; 232 psi)
- Heating surface
  - Firebox: 15.9 m^{2} (171 sq ft)
  - Tubes: 90.4 m^{2} (973 sq ft)
  - Flues: 71.3 m^{2} (767 sq ft)
  - Total surface: 177.6 m^{2} (1,912 sq ft)
- Superheater
  - Heating area: 64.1 m^{2} (690 sq ft)
- Cylinders: Two, outside
- Cylinder size: 600 mm × 660 mm (23 5/8 in × 26 in)
- Valve gear: Heusinger (Walschaerts) with lifting links
- Train heating: Steam
Performance figures
- Maximum speed: 80 km/h (50 mph) (both directions)
- Indicated power: 1,625 PS (1,200 kW; 1,600 hp)
Career
- Numbers: 50 001 – 50 3171 with gaps
- Retired: 1987

The DRB Class 50 are a German class of 2-10-0 "Decapod" type steam locomotives, built from 1939 as a standard locomotive (Einheitsdampflokomotive) for hauling goods trains. It had one leading axle and five coupled axles and was one of the most successful designs produced for the Deutsche Reichsbahn.

This class was procured in Germany as part of the Nazi Party's preparations for war that led to the Second World War (1939-1945). As late as 1948, 3,164 Class 50 engines were built by many European locomotive factories – towards the war's end as "provisional war locomotives" (Übergangskriegslokomotiven) and classified as 50 ÜK.

At the end of the steam locomotive era, they became virtually a universal class of mixed-traffic steam engine that, thanks to their low axle load, could even be employed on branch lines with light track beds. The Deutsche Bundesbahn grouped the locomotives into Classes 050, 051, 052 and 053 from 1968 so that the numbers were computer-compatible.

Some of the class were used by the Polish State Railways as type Ty5.

== General ==
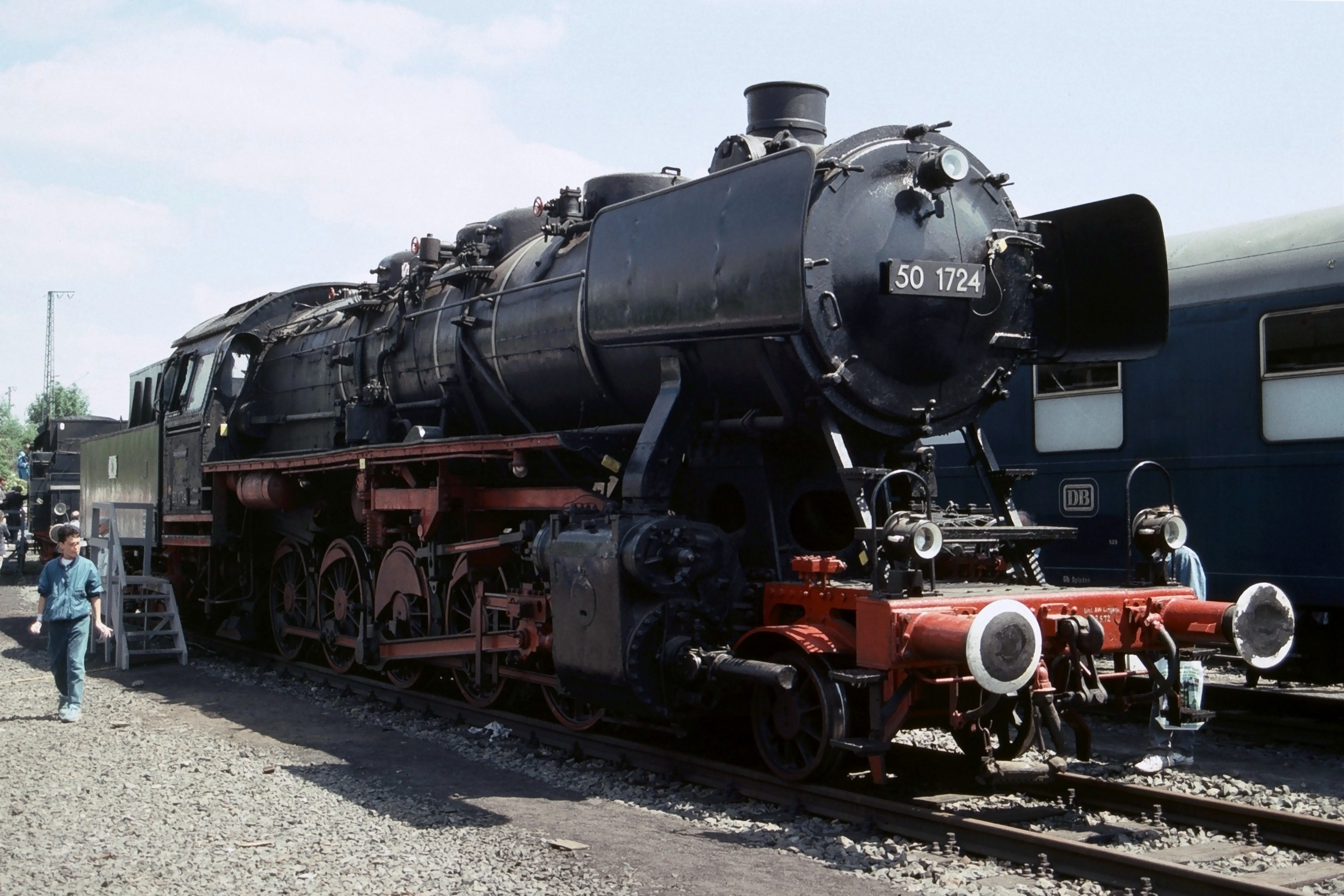
50 1724 at Köln-Gereon (26 May 1990)

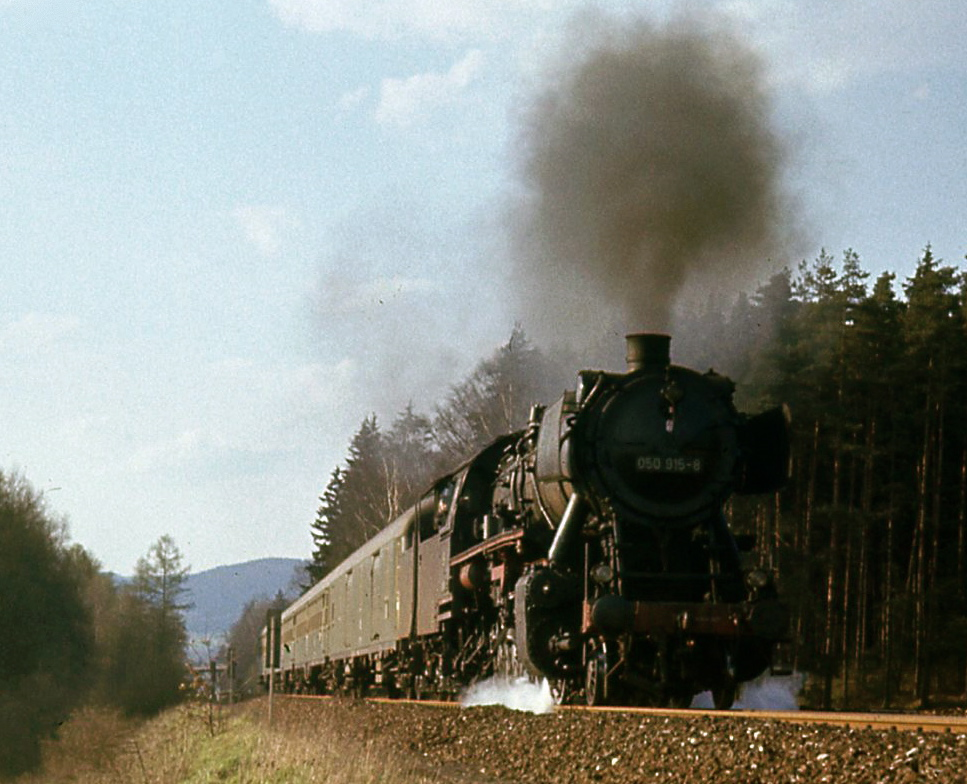
DB No. 050 915-8 on a Hof-Marktredwitz passenger train, Easter 1972

In spite of wartime losses, a large number of engines still remained in 1945. No fewer than 2,159 working locomotives were taken over by the Deutsche Bundesbahn alone and, for a long time, they formed the backbone of goods traffic operations together with the larger DRG Class 44. They were also used for passenger services.

To protect the engine crew when running in reverse, the front of the tender (a 2'2' T 26) was furnished with a protective shield. On many locomotives the Wagner smoke deflectors were replaced by the Witte model after the war. On 735 of the DB machines the tender was fitted with a conductor's cab, which meant that the volume of the coal bunker had to be reduced.

1452 locomotives were included in the new DB classification scheme. That said, 88 of them were already earmarked for withdrawal. Because the class number now had to consist of 3 figures, the designations 051, 052 and 053 had to be introduced in addition to 050.

As a result, the old Class 50 was divided as shown in the table:

Designation	Quantity	Due for Retirement
050	521	36
051	413	22
052	450	23
053	77	7

The last DB locomotives were retired from Duisburg-Wedau in 1977.

Only 350 examples of Class 50 engines remained in with the DR in East Germany after the war. Because only a small number of the numerous Class 44 fleet went to East Germany, the DRB Class 52 was the predominant goods train locomotive in many areas there. Of the Class 50s, 208 units were rebuilt into Class 50.35-37 engines. The original locomotives ran mainly in the south. From the middle of the 1970s they were retired in large numbers, so that in the 1980s they were real rarities. Nevertheless, the last ones ended their active duties in 1987 together with the rebuilds (Rekoloks).

Some of the original locomotives are preserved, including 50 622 and 50 849. No. 50 622 is stabled in the Nuremberg Transport Museum, where, on the evening of 17 October 2005, it was badly damaged in the great fire at the locomotive shed. The engine should however be able to be repaired with the aid of donations. No. 50 849 belongs to the Glauchau Railway Society (Eisenbahnverein Glauchau) and has Wagner smoke deflectors.

After the Second World War many examples of Class 50 engines were left in the other European states and some were used until the end of the steam traction era. For example, they were in service with the PKP (55 redesignated PKP class Ty5), the ČSD (28 redesignated class 555.1), the ÖBB and the DSB.

== DB Class 50.40 ==
DB Class 50.40
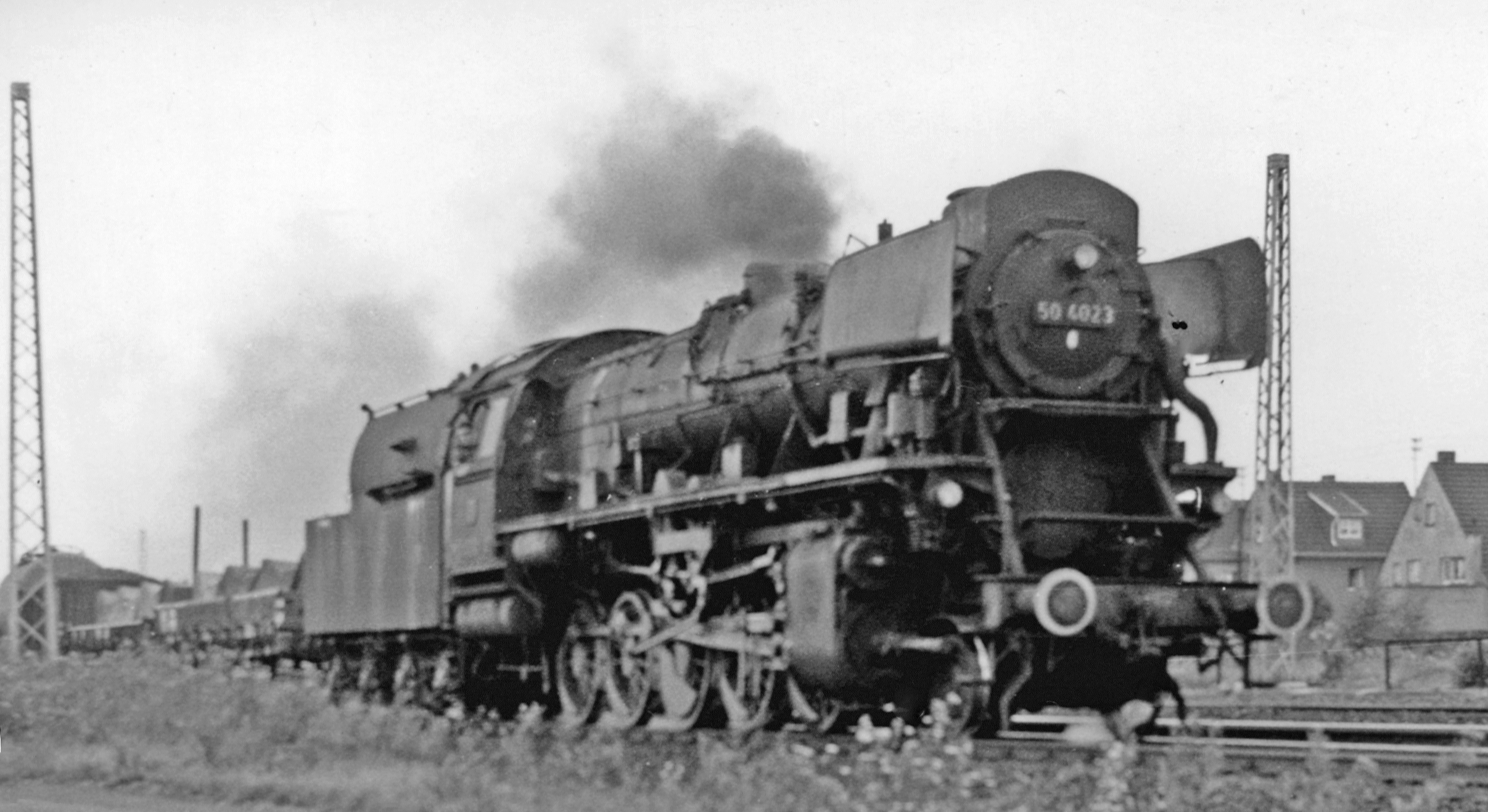
- DB 50 4023 at Spich, August 1961
Type and origin
- Power type: Steam
- Rebuilder: Henschel & Sohn
- Rebuild date: 1955
- Number rebuilt: 31
Specifications
- Axle load: 15.7 t (15.5 long tons; 17.3 short tons)
- Adhesive weight: 78.4 t (77.2 long tons; 86.4 short tons)
- Empty weight: 80.4 t (79.1 long tons; 88.6 short tons)
- Service weight: 90.6 t (89.2 long tons; 99.9 short tons)
- Firebox
  - Grate area: 3.1 m^{2} (33 sq ft)
- Boiler
  - Tube plates: 4,700 mm (15 ft 5 in)
  - Small tubes: 60 mm (2 3/8 in), 39 off
  - Large tubes: 152 mm (6 in), 24 off
- Heating surface
  - Firebox: 17.3 m^{2} (186 sq ft)
  - Tubes: 125.3 m^{2} (1,349 sq ft) *
  - Flues: 50.8 m^{2} (547 sq ft)
  - Total surface: 193.5 m^{2} (2,083 sq ft)
- Superheater
  - Heating area: 48.8 m^{2} (525 sq ft)
Performance figures
- Power output: 1,540 PS (1,130 kW; 1,520 hp)
Career
- Operators: Deutsche Bundesbahn
- Numbers: 50 4001 – 50 4031
- Retired: 1967
- * includes 91.2 m^{2} (982 sq ft) in the 161-tube feedwater heater Only changes from standard version shown

Because the Deutsche Bundesbahn had sufficient goods train locomotives, they could quickly phase out the DRB Class 52 engines, so that the ageing boilers on the Class 50s could be replaced by those of the Class 52s. Even the trough tender of the Kriegslokomotiven was used by the 50s amongst others. In the 1950s, several Class 50 locomotives served as trials engines. Thus 35 machines were given a boiler with mixer preheater and turbo feed pumps. Number 50 1503 was experimentally equipped with a Giesl ejector. In 1959 ten locomotives were given a boiler with smaller grate area in order to try to reduce the consumption of coal.

After experience with Franco-Crosti boilers on Class 52 locomotives (DB Class 42.90), Henschel rebuilt number 50 1412 in 1954 with such a boiler. This included a second preheater boiler underneath the actual locomotive boiler itself. After the smoke gases had flowed through the main boiler, they were turned around and passed through the preheater boiler. They escaped into the atmosphere through a side chimney along with the exhaust steam. The feed water was initially heated in a surface or mixer preheater, then in the preheater boiler before entering the main boiler. In this way the heat energy of the combustion gases could be better utilised and fuel consumption reduced. In 1958, 30 more engines were given Franco-Crosti smoke gas preheaters. These locos were redesignated as 50 4001 to 50 4031. Number 50 4011 was given oil firing. It was deployed in Münsterland and in the Rhineland. The locomotives were retired by 1967.

Adolph Giesl-Gieslingen describes in his book „Anatomie der Dampflokomotive" that the Sulfuric acid in the smoke condensed in the preheater and attacked the Heat exchanger. The conversion to Diesel and Electric locos led Italy and Germany both to abandon development of the Franco Crosti smoke pre-heater.

No locomotive was preserved.

== DR Class 50.35-37 ==
DR Class 50.35
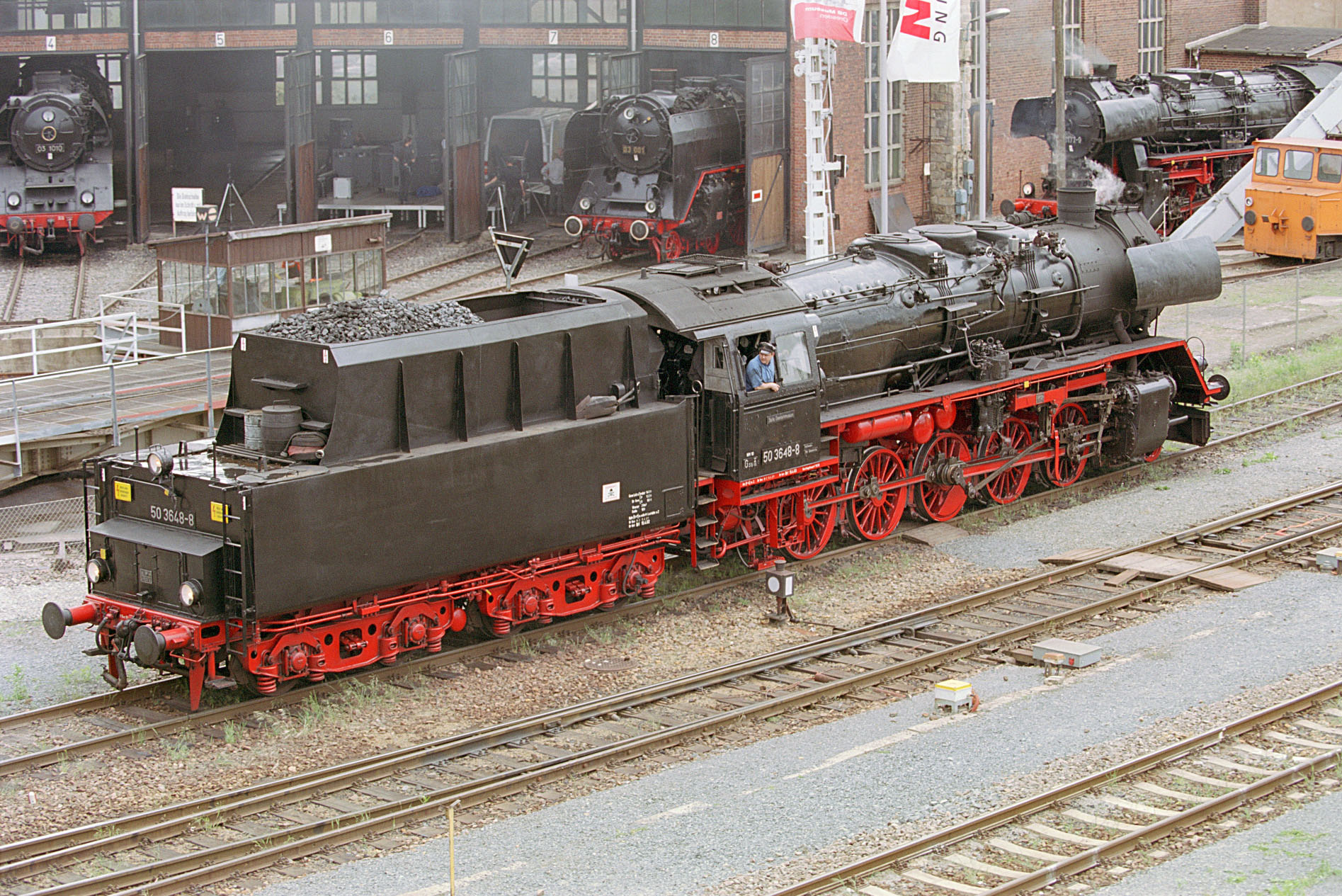
- 50 3648-8 in Dresden Altstadt shed
Type and origin
- Power type: Steam
- Rebuild date: 1957–1962
- Number rebuilt: 208
Specifications
- Axle load: 15.4 t (15.2 long tons; 17.0 short tons)
- Adhesive weight: 77.0 t (75.8 long tons; 84.9 short tons)
- Empty weight: 78.1 t (76.9 long tons; 86.1 short tons)
- Service weight: 88.2 t (86.8 long tons; 97.2 short tons)
- Firebox
  - Grate area: 3.7 m^{2} (40 sq ft)
- Boiler
  - Tube plates: 4,700 mm (15 ft 5 in)
  - Small tubes: 51 mm (2 in), 124 off
  - Large tubes: 133 mm (5 1/4 in), 38 off
- Heating surface
  - Firebox: 17.9 m^{2} (193 sq ft)
  - Tubes: 84.2 m^{2} (906 sq ft)
  - Flues: 70.7 m^{2} (761 sq ft)
  - Total surface: 172.3 m^{2} (1,855 sq ft)
- Superheater
  - Heating area: 65.4 m^{2} (704 sq ft)
Performance figures
- Indicated power: 1,760 PS (1,290 kW; 1,740 hp)
Career
- Operators: Deutsche Reichsbahn (GDR)
- Numbers: 50 3501 – 50 3708
- Retired: 1989
- Only changes from standard version shown

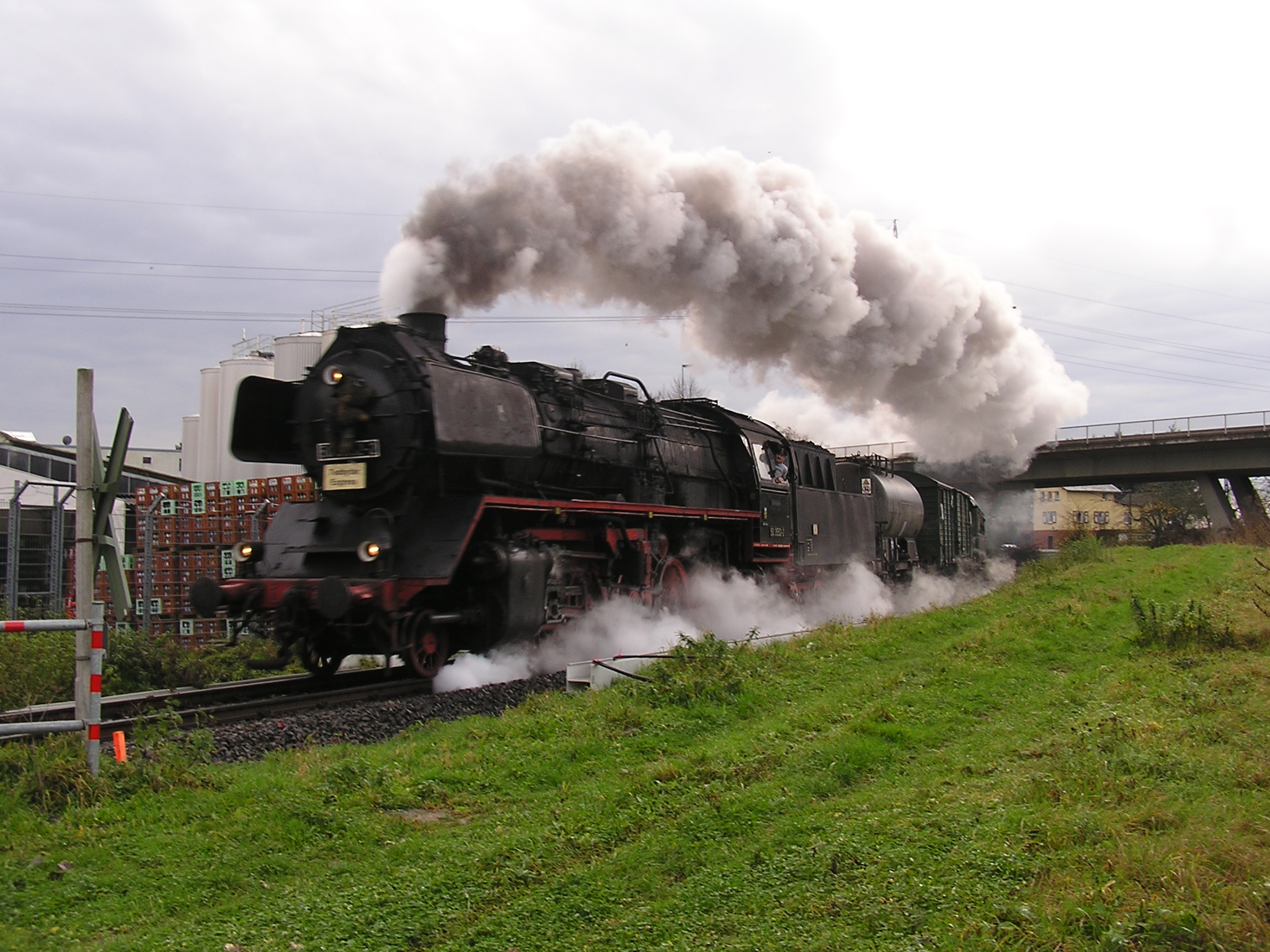
50 3552 in steam as the "Teddybear Express" on the Nidder Valley Railway

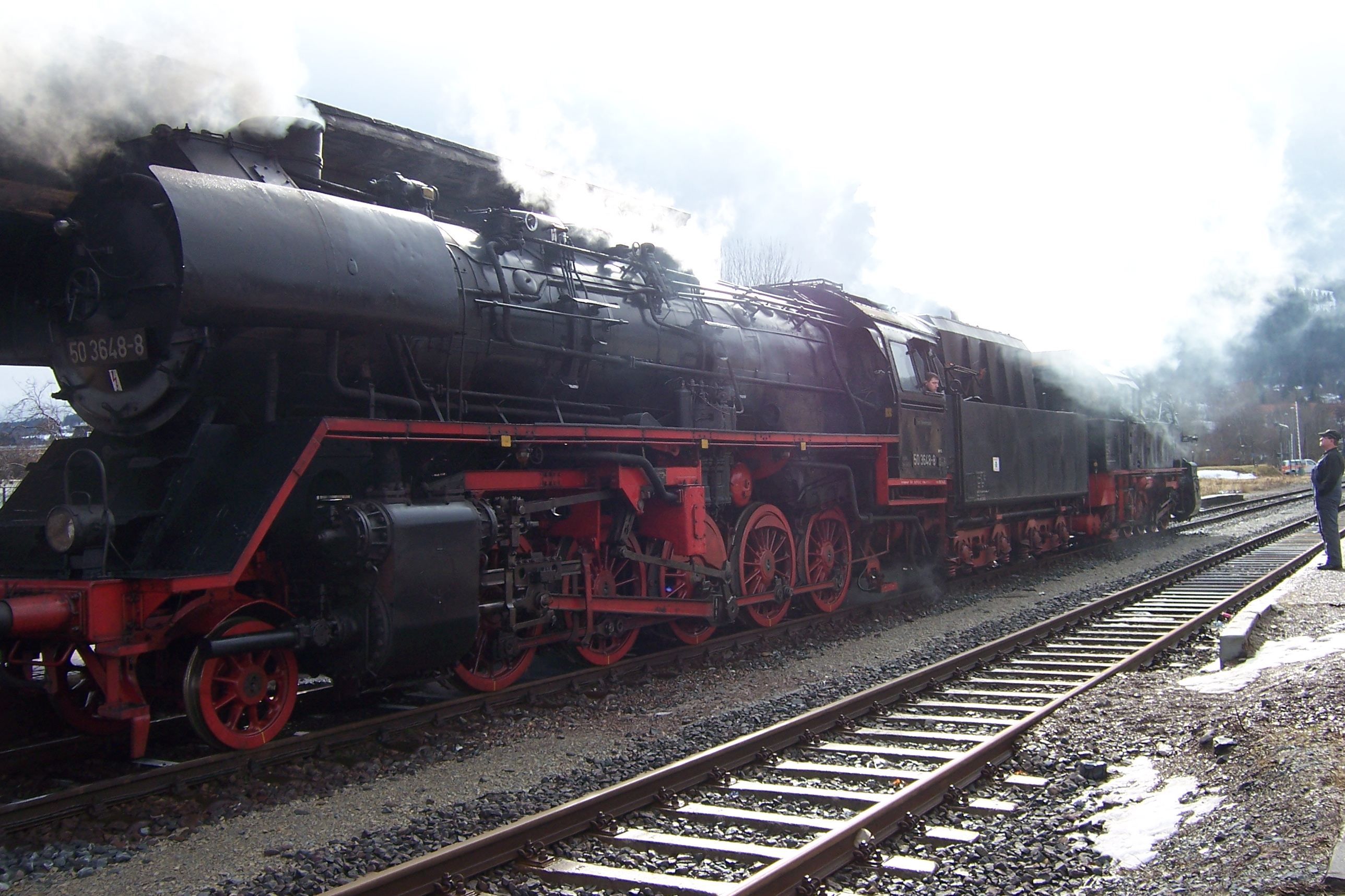
A DRG 50 in Ilmenau towing a special train on the Rennsteigbahn

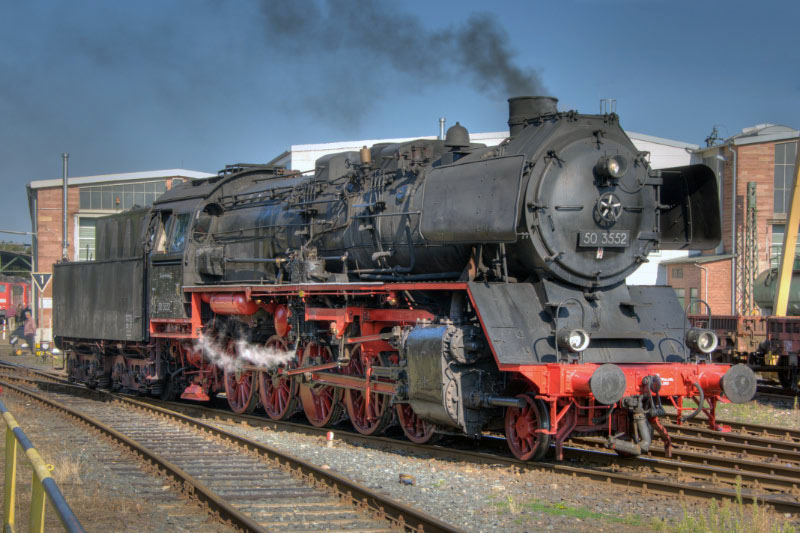
A DRG 50 3552 in Bischofsheim, Hesse

At the end of the 1930s, it was thought that a suitable boiler material had been found, in the form of St 47 K-Mo steel, that would allow boiler pressure to be increased to 20 bar without significantly raising the total weight of the boiler. The newly developed steel had a higher strength than the type of steel (St 34) used hitherto, but its disadvantage was that it had considerably worse conductivity. In the harsh everyday work of steam locomotives the material became very quickly fatigued, so that boilers made of the new steel had to be replaced after only a few years. The Class 50, too, was given such a boiler to begin with. Even though its condition was less critical than with other classes, it urgently needed replacing by the end of the 1950s. As a result, the DR in East Germany had the 50E replacement boiler developed on the basis of the new boilers equipping the Class 23.10 / 50.40, although because the locomotive frames were different it was given a 500 mm longer boiler barrel. This was later used on the rebuilds (the so-called Rekoloks), which saw the conversion of Class 23 engines, as well as conversions of the Class 52s into 52.80s and the Class 58s into 58.30s. Between 1958 and 1962, 208 Class 50 locomotives were given such a boiler, along with a mixer preheater, a larger radiative heating area and improved suction draught, which also raised its performance. Many engines were also equipped with Giesl ejectors. These Reko locomotives were allocated to sub-class 50.35 and given operating numbers 50 3501 to 50 3708. In their last years of operation these engines often ran with the new 2'2' T 28 tenders.

The engines were soon gathered together in the railway divisions of the northwest. After the conversion of engines to oil-fired Class 50.50, the remaining coal-fired ones were concentrated in the Magdeburg division. Replacing older locomotives as well as oil-fired ones, they returned to the Dresden and Schwerin divisions again by the end of the 1970s.

The last regular standard gauge steam train was hauled by a Class 50.35 locomotive. This was number 50 3559, which headed an official farewell service on 29 October 1988 on a round trip from Halberstadt to Magdeburg, Thale and back to Halberstadt. No. 50 3559 is used in Liblar as a restaurant.

There are several Class 50.35 locomotives, several of them still working, belonging to Deutsche Bahn AG and the many museum railways and railway museums, such as numbers 50 3501, 50 3539, 50 3564, 50 3576, 50 3616, 50 3648, 50 3654, 50 3695 and 50 3708.

=== DR Class 50.50 ===
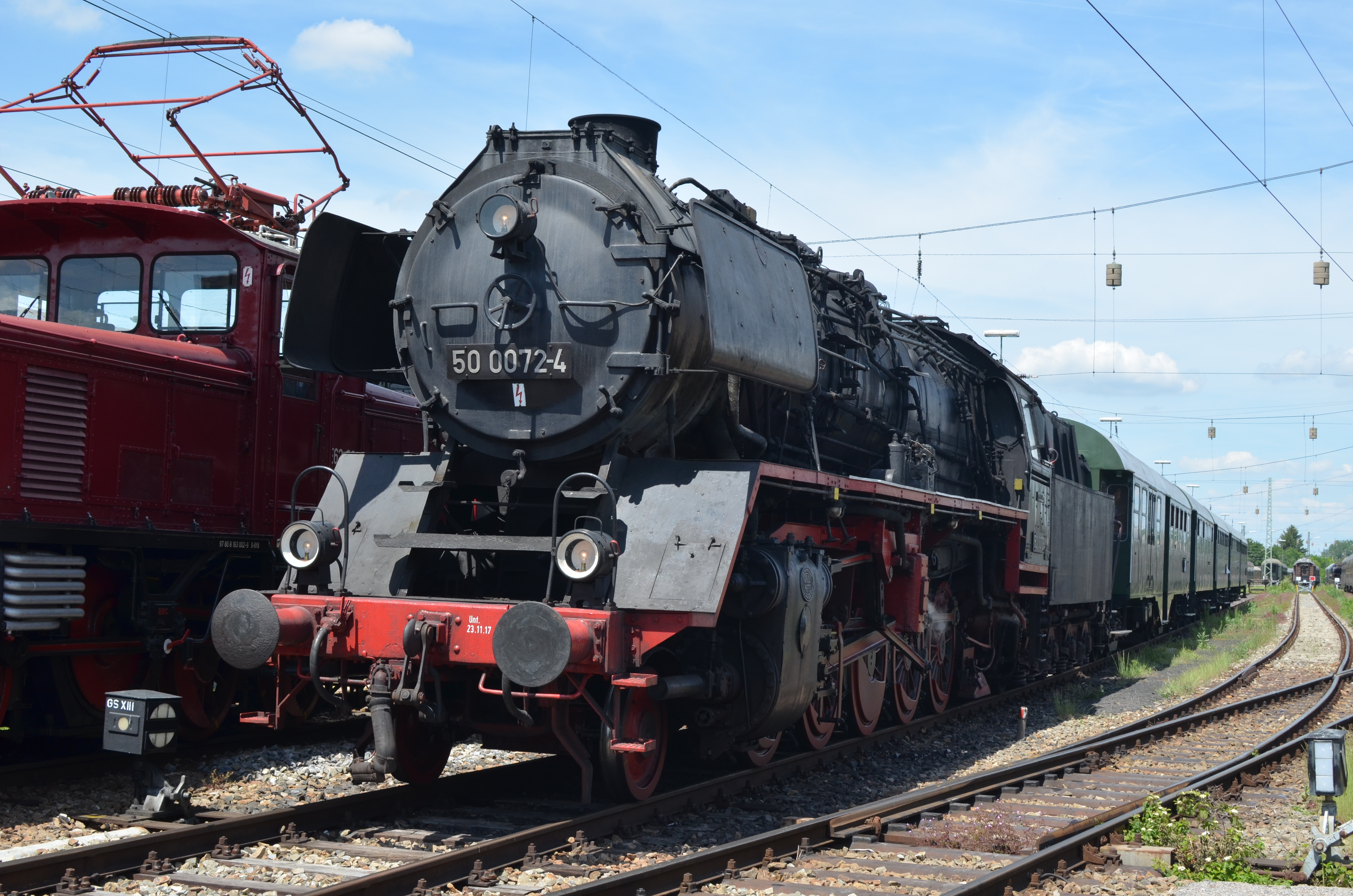
No. 50 0072 at the 50th Anniversary of the Bayerisches Eisenbahnmuseum

Between 1966 and 1971, 72 Class 50.35 locomotives were converted to oil-firing. To distinguish them, they were re-designated as Class 50.50. From the introduction of EDP numbers in 1970 they were given operating numbers 50 0001 to 50 0072. They were stationed in the Reichsbahn divisions of Schwerin and Greifswald and used for heavy goods train duties. Their sudden withdrawal in 1981 was a political decision as a result of the cost of crude oil prices in the Eastern Bloc which had suddenly risen sharply. This meant that they could now chemically process Bunker oil D; with the result that it was not longer available for locomotive firing.

In the Bavarian Railway Museum (Bayerischen Eisenbahnmuseum) in Nördlingen the last representative of this class, number 50 0072, is preserved.

== DR Class 50.40 ==
DR Class 50.40
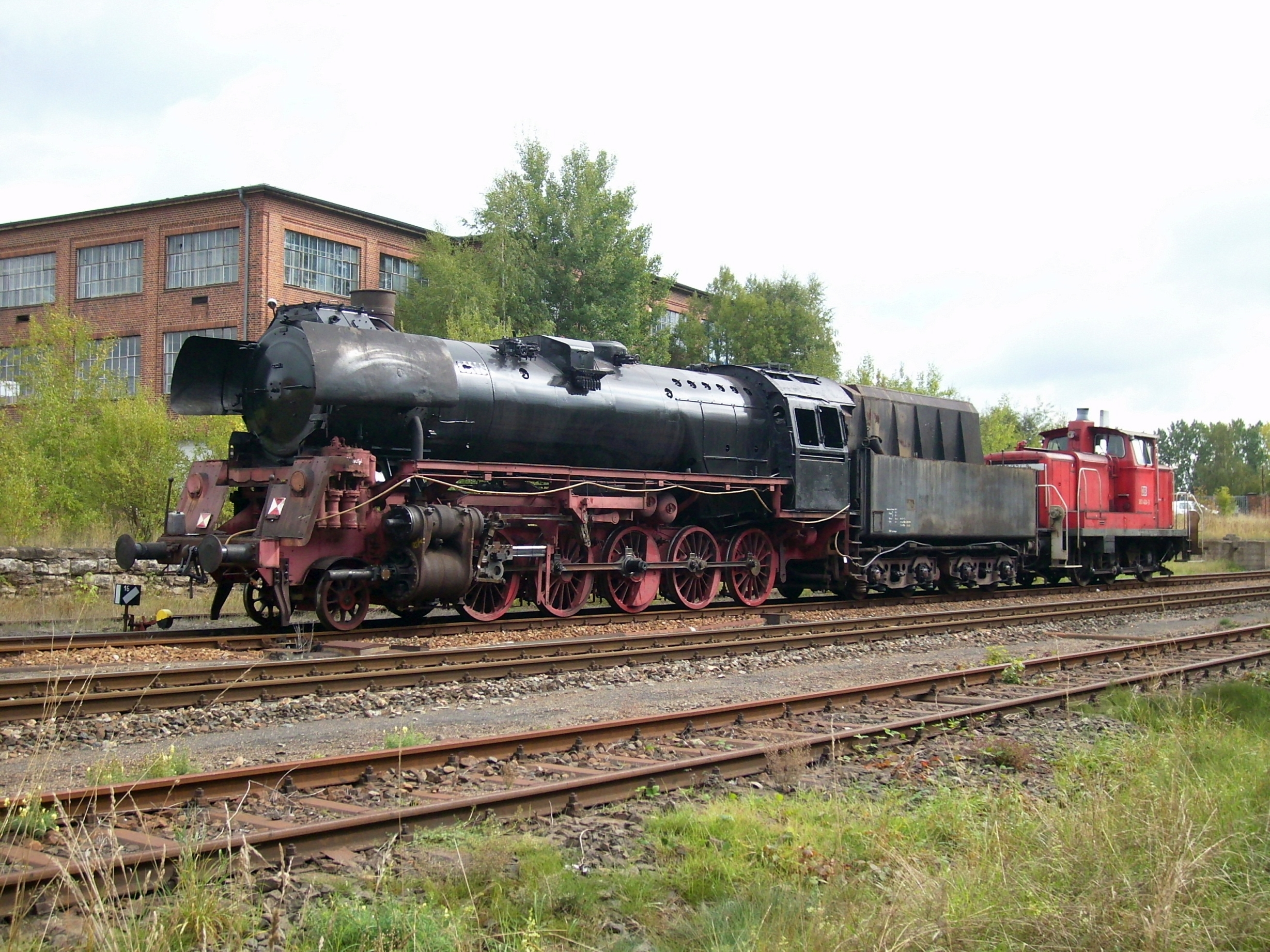
- 50 4073 in partially restored state.
Type and origin
- Power type: Steam
- Builder: VEB Lokomotivbau Karl Marx, Babelsberg
- Build date: 1956–1960
- Total produced: 88
Specifications
- Wheelbase
  - incl. tender: 18,435 mm (725 3/4 in)
- Length
  - Over headstocks: 21,360 mm (841 in)
  - Over buffers: 22,600 mm (889 3/4 in)
- Height: 4,550 mm (179 1/8 in)
- Axle load: 14.7 t (14.5 long tons; 16.2 short tons)
- Adhesive weight: 73.4 t (72.2 long tons; 80.9 short tons)
- Empty weight: 77.1 t (75.9 long tons; 85.0 short tons)
- Service weight: 85.9 t (84.5 long tons; 94.7 short tons)
- Tender type: 2′2′ T 28
- Fuel capacity: 10 t (9.8 long tons; 11 short tons)
- Water cap.: 28 m^{3} (6,160 imp gal; 7,400 US gal)
- Firebox
  - Grate area: 3.7 m^{2} (40 sq ft)
- Boiler
  - Pitch: 3,100 mm (122 in)
  - Tube plates: 4,200 mm (165 3/8 in)
  - Small tubes: 44.5 mm (1 3/4 in), 150 off
  - Large tubes: 133 mm (5 1/4 in), 38 off
- Heating surface
  - Firebox: 17.9 m^{2} (193 sq ft)
  - Tubes: 79.0 m^{2} (850 sq ft)
  - Flues: 62.7 m^{2} (675 sq ft)
  - Total surface: 159.6 m^{2} (1,718 sq ft)
- Superheater
  - Heating area: 68.5 m^{2} (737 sq ft)
Performance figures
- Indicated power: 1,760 PS (1,290 kW; 1,740 hp)
Career
- Operators: Deutsche Reichsbahn (GDR)
- Numbers: 50 4001 – 50 4088
- Retired: 1980
- Only changes from standard version shown

As well as modern passenger train locomotives, the DR in East Germany needed more goods train locomotives with a 15 t axle load. As a result, a parallel development, like those of the pre-war time, was initiated for a passenger train engine, the DR Class 23.10, and a goods train engine, the DR Class 50.40, in order that many of their components could be interchangeable. The running gear conformed broadly to that of the Einheitslok, but a plate frame had to be used, because bar frames could no longer be worked. The boiler was a new build to modern construction standards with a combustion chamber and a mixer preheater. In terms of performance it was roughly comparable to the standard boiler, but was somewhat more economic in its fuel consumption. The locomotives were also given new tenders, the 2'2' T 28. The 88 engines, which were renumbered from 50 4001 to 50 4088, were delivered between 1956 and 1960. Number 50 4088 was therefore the last standard gauge steam engine to be newly built in Germany. They were permanently stationed on the routes over the plains in the northern railway divisions. Because the plate frame soon proved to be the weakest link (with a high repair bill), the locos were taken out of traction service by 1980, but continued to be used as heating engines.

The Bavarian Railway Museum (Bayerische Eisenbahnmuseum) in Nördlingen has acquired the last preserved engine of this type, number 50 4073. It is currently in the Meiningen Steam Locomotive Works at and is awaiting external refurbishment.

== Other railway companies ==
After the Second World War several Class 50 locomotives were left in eastern Europe, where some of the railway administrations procured more of them. For example, the Romanian State Railway CFR produced 282 copies of Class 50 locomotives between 1947 and 1959. 40 Romanian 150s were supplied to China in 1958, became class DK5 in 1959 and were numbered 241–280. DK5-250 is preserved at the Shenyang Railway Museum. Some were also supplied to the Korean State Railway in North Korea, where they were numbered in the 150 series.

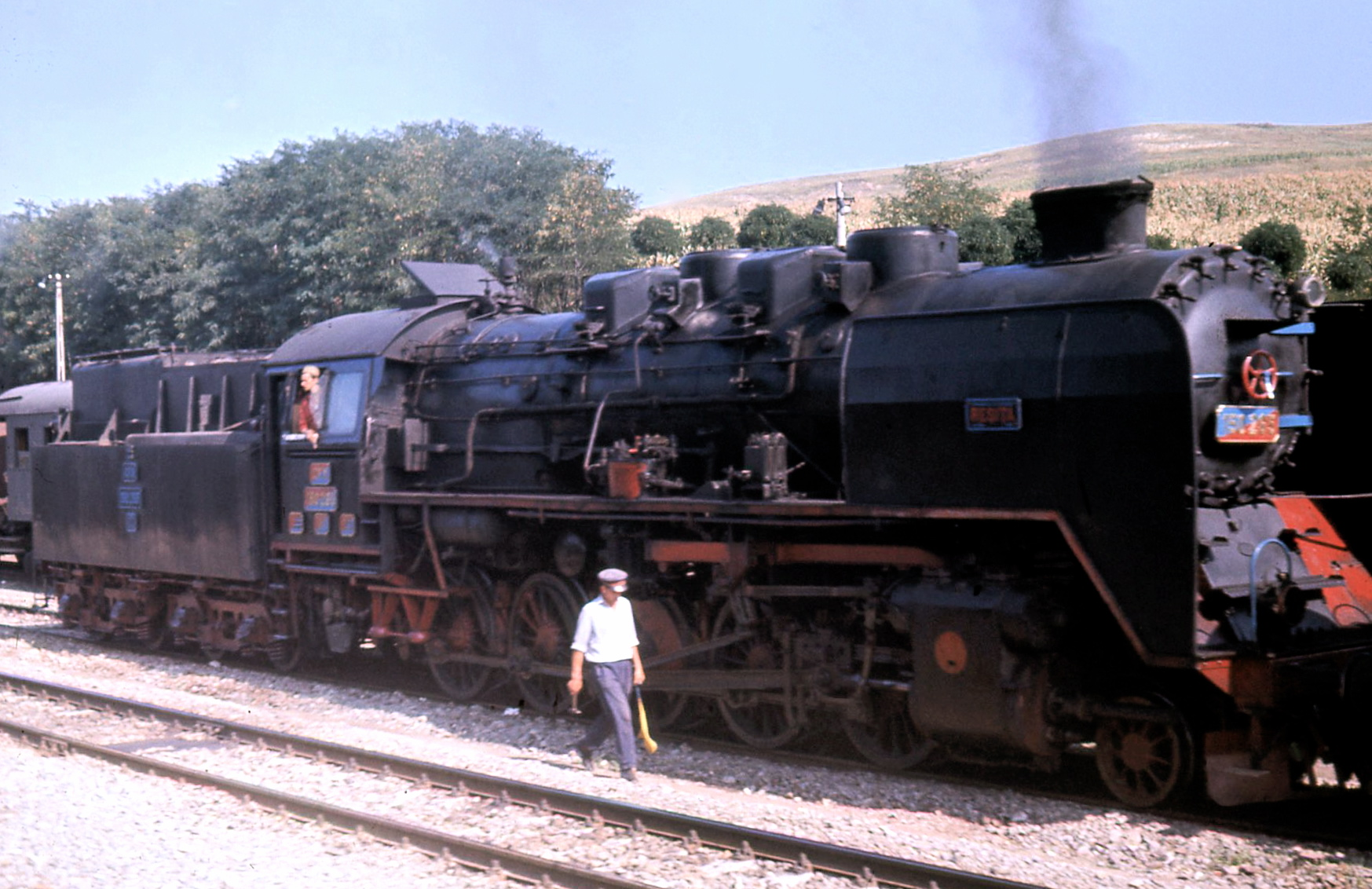
Romanian 150 class loco, DRG 50 class as copied by Resita; near Cluj-Napoca, 1972

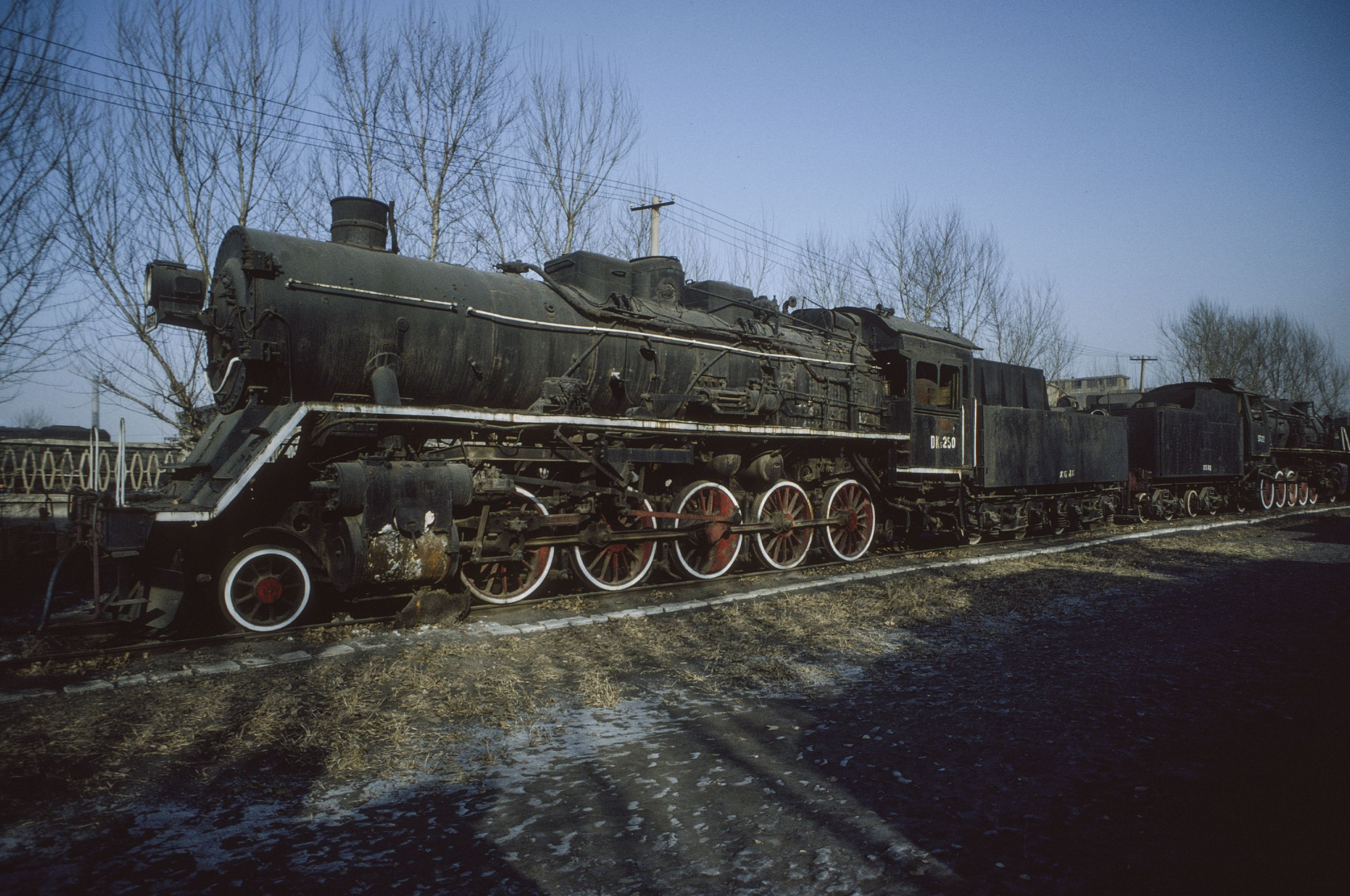
DK5-250 at the Shenyang Railway Museum

== See also ==
- List of DRG locomotives and railbuses
