= DRG Class 23 =

DRB Class 23 DR Class 23.0 DR Class 35.20
Type and origin
- Power type: Steam
- Builder: Schichau-Werke
- Serial number: 3443–3444
- Build date: 1941
- Total produced: 2
Specifications
- Configuration
  - Whyte: 2-6-2
  - UIC: 1′C1′ h2
  - German: P 35.18
- Gauge: 1,435 mm (4 ft 8 1/2 in)
- Leading dia.: 1,000 mm (39 3/8 in)
- Driver dia.: 1,750 mm (68 7/8 in)
- Trailing dia.: 1,250 mm (49 1/4 in)
- Tender wheels: 1,000 mm (39 3/8 in)
- Wheelbase
  - Axle spacing (Asymmetrical): 3,100 mm (10 ft 2 in) +; 2,050 mm (6 ft 8 3/4 in) +; 2,050 mm (6 ft 8 3/4 in) +; 3,500 mm (11 ft 5 3/4 in) =
  - Engine: 10,700 mm (35 ft 1 1/4 in)
  - Tender: 1,900 mm (6 ft 2 3/4 in) +; 1,900 mm (6 ft 2 3/4 in) +; 1,900 mm (6 ft 2 3/4 in) =; 5,700 mm (18 ft 8 3/8 in)
- Length
  - Over headstocks: 21,640 mm (71 ft 0 in)
  - Over buffers: 22,940 mm (75 ft 3 1/8 in)
- Height: 4,550 mm (14 ft 11 1/8 in)
- Axle load: 18 t (18 long tons; 20 short tons)
- Adhesive weight: 53.92 t (53.07 long tons; 59.44 short tons)
- Empty weight: 80.14 t (78.87 long tons; 88.34 short tons)
- Service weight: 88.32 t (86.93 long tons; 97.36 short tons)
- Total weight: 148.2 t (145.9 long tons; 163.4 short tons)
- Tender type: 2′2′ T 26
- Fuel type: Coal
- Fuel capacity: 8 t (7.9 long tons; 8.8 short tons)
- Water cap.: 26 m^{3} (5,700 imp gal; 6,900 US gal)
- Firebox
  - Grate area: 3.9 m^{2} (42 sq ft)
- Boiler
  - Pitch: 3,050 mm (10 ft 1/8 in)
  - Tube plates: 5,200 mm (17 ft 3/4 in)
  - Small tubes: 54 mm (2 1/8 in), 113 off
  - Large tubes: 133 mm (5 1/4 in), 35 off
- Boiler pressure: 16 bar (16.3 kgf/cm^{2}; 232 psi)
- Heating surface
  - Firebox: 15.9 m^{2} (171 sq ft)
  - Tubes: 90.4 m^{2} (973 sq ft)
  - Flues: 71.3 m^{2} (767 sq ft)
  - Total surface: 177.6 m^{2} (1,912 sq ft)
- Superheater
  - Heating area: 64.1 m^{2} (690 sq ft)
- Cylinders: Two, outside
- Cylinder size: 550 mm × 660 mm (21 5/8 in × 26 in)
- Valve gear: Heusinger (Walschaerts)
- Train heating: Steam
Performance figures
- Maximum speed: 110 km/h (68 mph)
- Indicated power: 1,500 PS (1,100 kW; 1,480 hp)
Career
- Operators: Deutsche Reichsbahn; Deutsche Reichsbahn (DDR)
- Numbers: 23 001 – 23 002; 35 2001-2 from 1970
- Retired: 1975

The German Class 23 (Baureihe 23 or BR 23) engines of the Deutsche Reichsbahn (DRG) were standard (Einheitslokomotiven) steam engines that were conceived as a replacement for the Prussian P 8 by the Schichau Works. They were given the same boiler as the Class 50s which were developed in parallel and, like them, the newly developed 2'2' T 26 tender with its front wall that protected train crews during reverse running.

In 1941 the two prototypes were built and delivered. The procurement of 800 locomotives had been planned, however the constraints of the Second World War meant that they never entered full production.

After the war the two locomotives, with operating numbers 23 001 and 23 002, went to the DR in East Germany and were variously stabled in Berlin, Brandenburg an der Havel, Jüterbog and Halle. In 1961, number 23 001 was given a Reko boiler with combustion chamber, developed for the Class 50. In 1970 the locomotive was given EDP number 35 2001–2. Number 23 002 was to be reconstructed, but was retired however in 1967 due to damage to the frame and scrapped. Number 23 001 was scrapped in 1975 in Cottbus, as it could no longer serve any useful purpose.

After the war, the design of these Class 23 locomotives formed the basis for the new DB Class 23 and DR Class 23.10 locomotives which received the same class designation.

== See also ==
- List of DRG locomotives and railbuses
