= Prussian G 12 (CFOA type) =

Class of 5+10 German 2-10-0 locomotives

Prussian G 12 (CFOA type) TCDD 56901–56910 État belge Type 92 PH class O' CFL class 53 Chemins de fer de l'Est 5015 DR Class 58^{10} DR Class 58^{6}
Type and origin
- Builder: Henschel & Sohn
- Build date: 1917–18
- Total produced: 5 + 10
Specifications
- Configuration
  - Whyte: 2-10-0
- Gauge: 1,435 mm (4 ft 8 1/2 in)
- Leading dia.: 820 mm (2 ft 8 1/4 in)
- Driver dia.: 1,250 mm (4 ft 1 1/4 in)
- Axle load: 15.72 t (15.47 long tons; 17.33 short tons)
- Adhesive weight: 78.6 t (77.4 long tons; 86.6 short tons)
- Service weight: 91.3 t (89.9 long tons; 100.6 short tons)
- Water cap.: 21.0 m^{3} (4,600 imp gal; 5,500 US gal)
- Boiler pressure: 13 kgf/cm^{2} (1,270 kPa; 185 lbf/in^{2})
- Heating surface
  - Firebox: 4.50 m^{2} (48.4 sq ft)
  - Evaporative: 241.4 m^{2} (2,598 sq ft)
- Superheater
  - Heating area: 80.9 m^{2} (871 sq ft)
- Cylinder size: 560 mm (22 1/16 in)
- Piston stroke: 600 mm (23 5/8 in)
Performance figures
- Maximum speed: 45 km/h (28 mph)
Career
- Numbers: DR 58 1001; DR 58 601 – 58 603 PH 505–507 CFL 5301-5303 CFOA 101–110, TCDD 56901–56910

The Prussian G 12 CFOA-type variant was a class of German 2-10-0 locomotives used by the Prussian state railways. The locomotives of this type were originally an order from the Ottoman Ministry of War, and fifteen examples were intended for the Chemins de fer Ottomans d'Anatolie (CFOA). Due to the course of the war, only five locomotives could initially be delivered by Henschel to the CFOA. The other five locomotives went to the German Military Railways with the consent of the customer. They were assigned to the Military Directorate General in Brussels (Militär-Generaldirektionsbezirk Brüssel) as G 12 numbers 5551 to 5555. To replace these five locomotives, Henschel delivered another five locomotives to the CFOA in 1918. The remaining five locomotives ordered for the Ottoman Empire were not made.

The CFOA design differed from the later Prussian G 12 in almost all dimensions. It has a larger boiler with a radially-stayed firebox (the G 12 had a Belpaire firebox), but smaller cylinders and smaller driving wheels

After World War I only No. 5553 remained in Germany and was renumbered as 58 1001 by Deutsche Reichsbahn in 1925. It was withdrawn in 1931. The remaining four locomotives were among the locomotives to be handed over to the Allies as part of the Treaty of Versailles. No. 5554 went to the Chemins de fer de l'Est, numbered 5015 and withdrawn shortly after 1945 when it was returned unserviceable from Germany. The other three locos went to the Belgian State Railways, who classed them in Type 92 (9251, 9253 and 9255) before quickly selling them in 1927 to the Société Luxembourgeoise des Minières et Chemins de Fer Prince Henri (Prince Henry Railway and Mining Company) in Luxembourg, where they were classified as O'.

During the occupation of Luxembourg during World War II, these three locomotives were taken into the Reichsbahn's inventory as 58 601 to 58 603. After the war, the newly founded state railway of Luxembourg Société Nationale des Chemins de Fer Luxembourgeois (CFL) took over the Prince Henry Railway and its locomotive fleet; the series O' receiving the new classification 53. The last example was retired by the CFL in 1957.

The ten copies delivered to CFOA were taken over by the newly founded state railway of Turkey Türkiye Cumhuriyeti Devlet Demiryolları (TCDD). in 1957. They were withdrawn in the early 1950s.
