= DR Class 23.10 =

DR Class 23.10 (35.10)
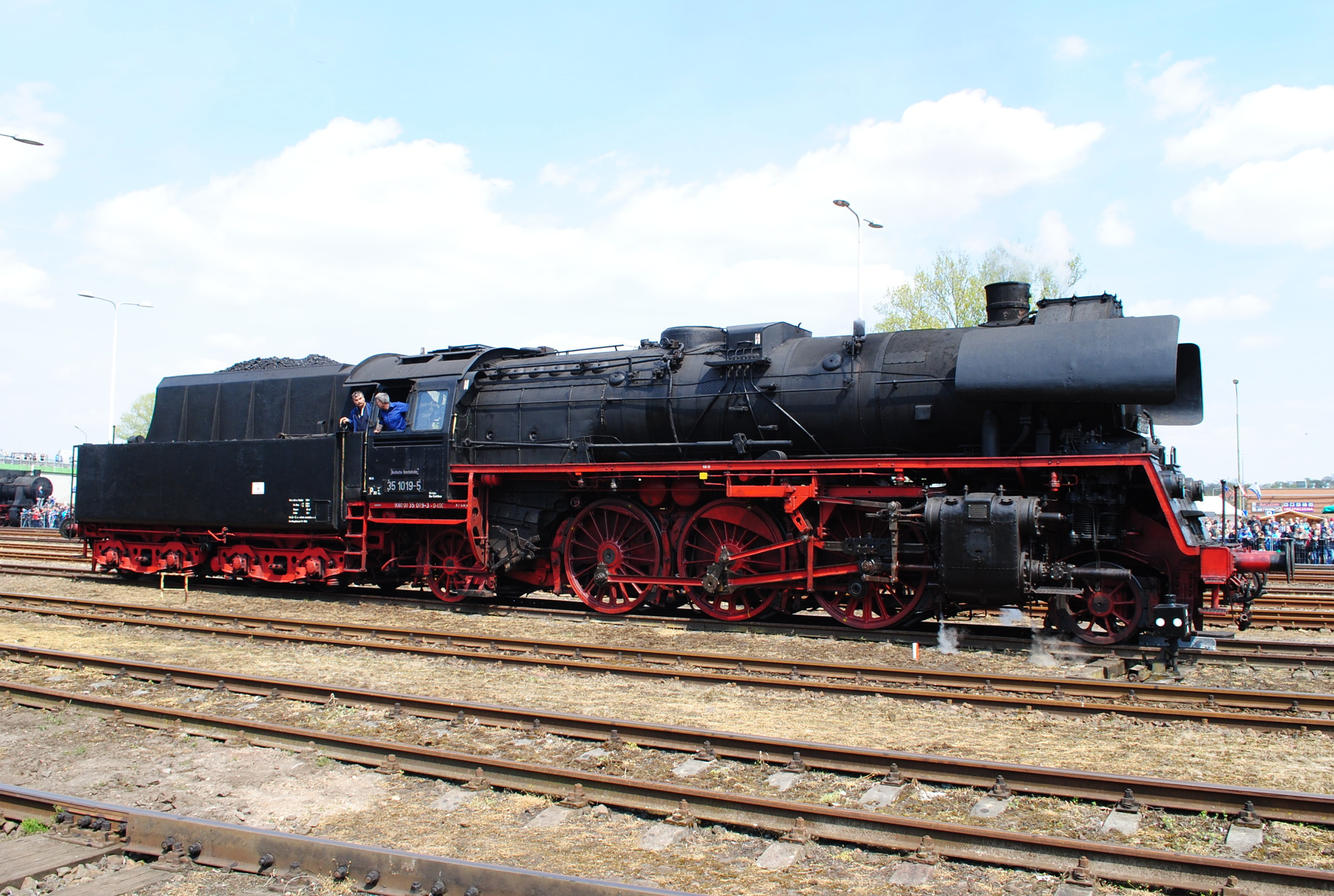
- 35 1019-5 in April 2016
Type and origin
- Power type: Steam
- Builder: LKM Babelsberg
- Serial number: 656002/1, 656002/2, 123003–123113
- Build date: 1955–1959
- Total produced: 113
Specifications
- Configuration
  - Whyte: 2-6-2
  - UIC: 1′C1′ h2
  - German: P 35.18
- Gauge: 1,435 mm (4 ft 8 1/2 in)
- Leading dia.: 1,000 mm (3 ft 3 3/8 in)
- Driver dia.: 1,750 mm (5 ft 8 7/8 in)
- Trailing dia.: 1,250 mm (4 ft 1 1/4 in)
- Tender wheels: 1,000 mm (3 ft 3 3/8 in)
- Wheelbase
  - Axle spacing (Asymmetrical): 3,000 mm (9 ft 10 1/8 in) +; 2,000 mm (6 ft 6 3/4 in) +; 2,000 mm (6 ft 6 3/4 in) +; 3,100 mm (10 ft 2 in) =
  - Engine: 10,100 mm (33 ft 1 5/8 in)
  - Tender: 1,900 mm (6 ft 2 3/4 in) +; 1,900 mm (6 ft 2 3/4 in) +; 1,900 mm (6 ft 2 3/4 in) =; 5,700 mm (18 ft 8 3/8 in)
  - incl. tender: 18,610 mm (61 ft 5/8 in)
- Length
  - Over headstocks: 21,360 mm (70 ft 1 in)
  - Over buffers: 22,660 mm (74 ft 4 1/8 in)
- Height: 4,550 mm (14 ft 11 1/8 in)
- Axle load: 18.3 t (18.0 long tons; 20.2 short tons)
- Adhesive weight: 54.7 t (53.8 long tons; 60.3 short tons)
- Empty weight: 78.5 t (77.3 long tons; 86.5 short tons)
- Service weight: 87.2 t (85.8 long tons; 96.1 short tons)
- Tender type: 2′2′ T 28
- Fuel type: Coal
- Fuel capacity: 10 t (9.8 long tons; 11 short tons)
- Water cap.: 28 m^{3} (6,160 imp gal; 7,400 US gal)
- Firebox
  - Grate area: 3.71 m^{2} (39.9 sq ft)
- Boiler
  - Pitch: 3,100 mm (10 ft 2 in)
  - Tube plates: 4,200 mm (13 ft 9 3/8 in)
  - Small tubes: 44.5 mm (1 3/4 in), 150 off
  - Large tubes: 133 mm (5 1/4 in), 38 off
- Boiler pressure: 16 bar (16.3 kgf/cm^{2}; 232 psi)
- Heating surface
  - Firebox: 17.9 m^{2} (193 sq ft)
  - Tubes: 79.0 m^{2} (850 sq ft)
  - Flues: 62.7 m^{2} (675 sq ft)
  - Total surface: 159.6 m^{2} (1,718 sq ft)
- Superheater
  - Heating area: 65.7 m^{2} (707 sq ft)
- Cylinders: Two, outside
- Cylinder size: 550 mm × 660 mm (21 5/8 in × 26 in)
Performance figures
- Maximum speed: Forwards: 110 km/h (68 mph); Reverse: 50 km/h (31 mph)
- Indicated power: 1,700 PS (1,250 kW; 1,680 hp)
Career
- Operators: Deutsche Reichsbahn (GDR)
- Numbers: New: 23 1001 – 23 1113; 1970: 35 1001 – 35 1113
- Retired: 1991

The steam locomotives of DR Class 23.10, (from 1 June 1970 Class 35.10) were passenger train engines built for the Deutsche Reichsbahn in East Germany after the Second World War.

== History ==
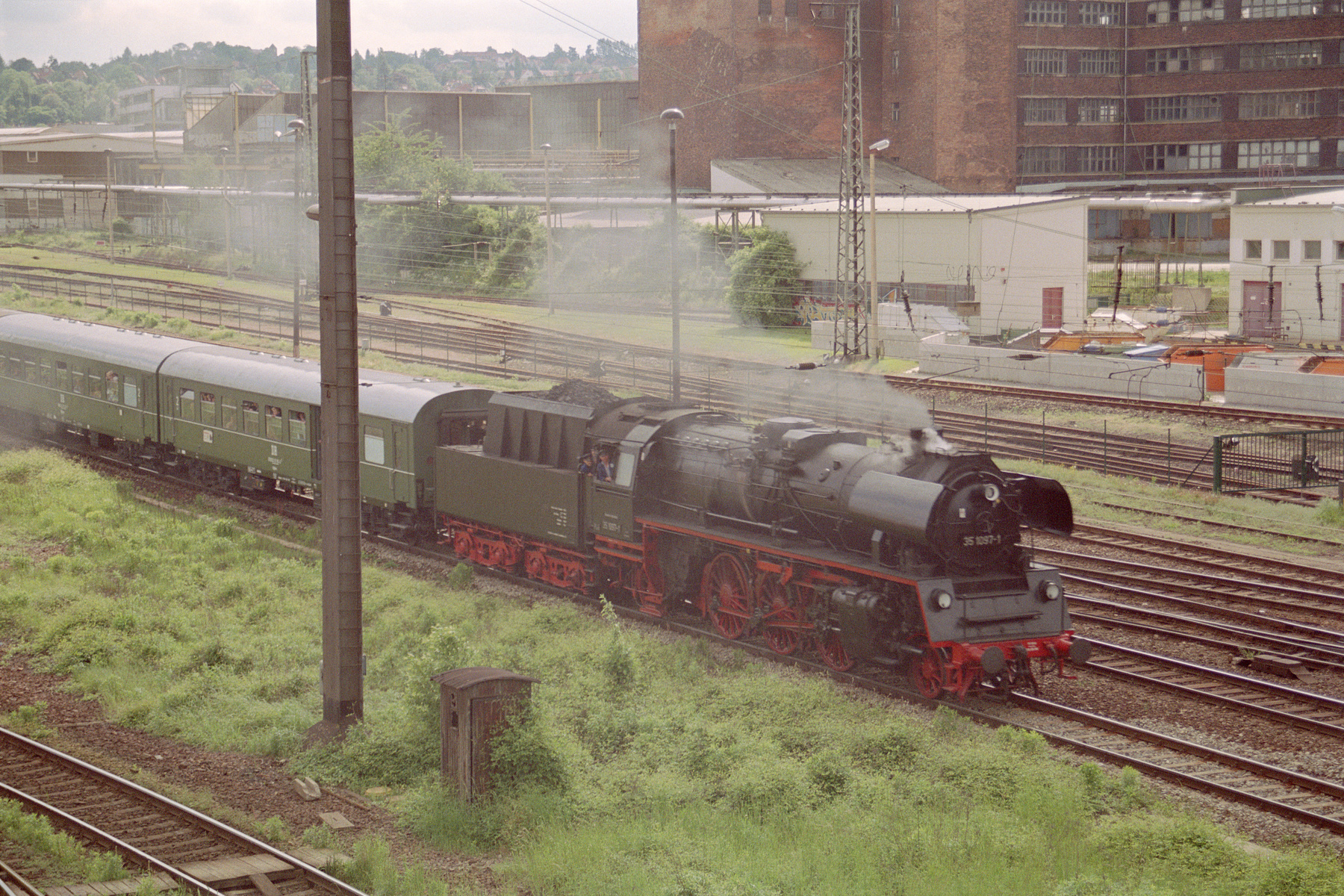
35 1097-1 in Dresden in 1999

The Class 23.10 was an evolutionary development by the DR of the DRG Class 23 standard locomotives or Einheitsdampflokomotiven built earlier by the Deutsche Reichsbahn-Gesellschaft. Only two of the latter were completed due to the onset of the war. The same dimensions were used for the driving and running gear, but the locomotives were given IfS/DR mixer-preheaters, boilers equipped with combustion chambers and a large driver's cab. The feedwater dome was omitted from locomotives numbered 23 1003 and later. The first of 113 units was deployed in 1955, and they were used for light to medium express train services, being allocated numbers 23 1001 to 23 1113.

With the introduction of EDP numbering on 1 January 1970, all locomotives were re-numbered to 35 1001 to 35 1113.

The last engines were retired from Nossen in May 1977, number 35 1113 however had to be reactivated due to the energy crisis and continued in service until 1985.

The locomotives were equipped with tenders of Class 2′2′ T 28.

== Preserved locomotives ==
Remaining locomotives of this class today include:

- 35 1019 Lausitzer Dampflokclub Cottbus, operational
- 35 1021 Eisenbahn & Technik Museum Rügen, Prora
- 35 1028 in pieces, Röbel/Müritz
- 35 1074 in pieces, Görlitz
- 35 1097 private, at IG 58 3047 Glauchau, operational
- 35 1113 DB Museum, stored at IG Dampflok Nossen

== See also ==
- List of East German Deutsche Reichsbahn locomotives and railbuses
- Neubaulok
- DB Class 23

== Literature ==
- Ebel, J.U.; Stange, A.; Schlegel, D. (2003). Die Baureihe 23.10 (in German). Freiburg: EK-Verlag. ISBN 978-3-88255-123-5.
- Hütter, Ingo (2009). Die Dampflokomotiven der Baureihen 01 bis 45 der DRG, DRB, DB, und DR (in German). Werl: DGEG Medien. pp. 219–222. ISBN 978-3-937189-45-1.
- Weisbrod, Manfred; Müller, Hans; Petznik, Wolfgang (1976). Dampflokomotiven deutscher Eisenbahnen, Baureihe 01–39 (EFA 1.1) (in German) (3rd ed.). Düsseldorf: Alba Buchverlag. pp. 181–184. ISBN 3-87094-081-6.
