= DR Class 52.80 =

Class of 200 East German locomotives

DR Class 52.80 (Rebuild of DRB Class 52)
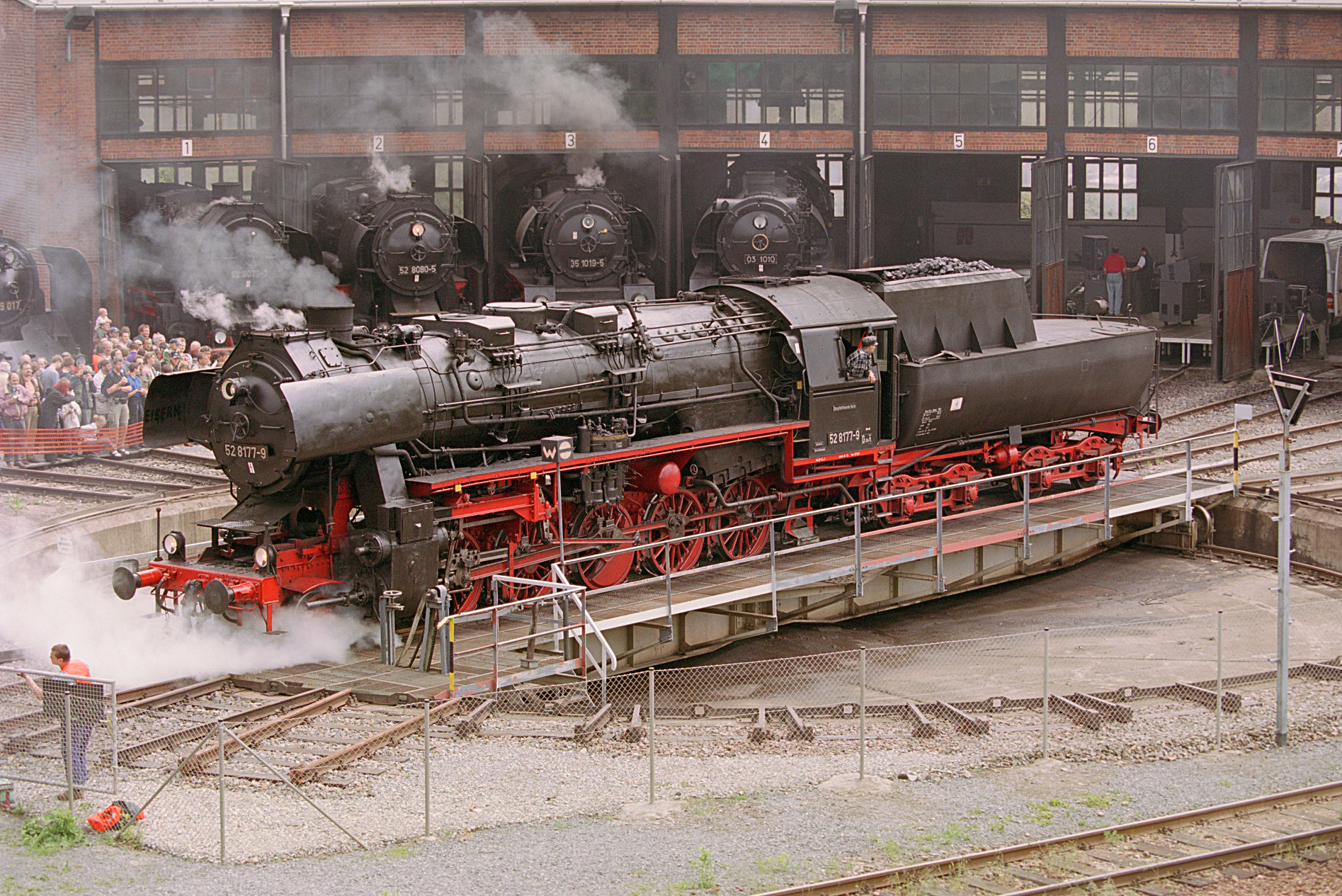
- Rekolok 52 8177 at the 2003 Dresden Steam Festival
Type and origin
- Power type: Steam
- Rebuilder: RAW Stendal
- Rebuild date: 1960–1967
- Number rebuilt: 200
Specifications
- Configuration
  - Whyte: 2-10-0
  - UIC: 1′E h2
  - German: G 56.15
- Gauge: 1,435 mm (4 ft 8 1/2 in)
- Leading dia.: 850 mm (2 ft 9 1/2 in)
- Driver dia.: 1,400 mm (4 ft 7 1/8 in)
- Tender wheels: 1,000 mm (3 ft 3 3/8 in)
- Wheelbase
  - Axle spacing (Asymmetrical): 2,600 mm (8 ft 6 3/8 in) +; 1,650 mm (5 ft 5 in) +; 1,650 mm (5 ft 5 in) +; 1,650 mm (5 ft 5 in) +; 1,650 mm (5 ft 5 in) =
  - Engine: 9,200 mm (30 ft 2 1/4 in)
  - Tender: 1,800 mm (5 ft 10 7/8 in) +; 2,300 mm (7 ft 6 1/2 in) +; 1,800 mm (5 ft 10 7/8 in) =; 5,900 mm (19 ft 4 1/4 in)
  - incl. tender: 19,000 mm (62 ft 4 in)
- Length
  - Over headstocks: 21,675 mm (71 ft 1 3/8 in)
  - Over buffers: 22,975 mm (75 ft 4 1/2 in)
- Height: 4,550 mm (14 ft 11 1/8 in)
- Axle load: 15.9 t (15.6 long tons; 17.5 short tons)
- Adhesive weight: 79.6 t (78.3 long tons; 87.7 short tons)
- Empty weight: 80.0 t (78.7 long tons; 88.2 short tons)
- Service weight: 89.7 t (88.3 long tons; 98.9 short tons)
- Tender weight: 18.5 t (18.2 long tons; 20.4 short tons)
- Tender type: 2′2′ T 30
- Fuel type: Coal
- Fuel capacity: 10 t (9.8 long tons; 11 short tons)
- Water cap.: 30 m^{3} (6,600 imp gal; 7,900 US gal)
- Firebox
  - Grate area: 3.71 m^{2} (39.9 sq ft)
- Boiler
  - Pitch: 3,050 mm (10 ft 1/8 in)
  - Tube plates: 4,700 mm (15 ft 5 in)
  - Small tubes: 51 mm (2 in), 124 off
  - Large tubes: 133 mm (5 1/4 in), 38 off
- Boiler pressure: 16 bar (16.3 kgf/cm^{2}; 232 psi)
- Heating surface
  - Firebox: 17.9 m^{2} (193 sq ft)
  - Tubes: 84.2 m^{2} (906 sq ft)
  - Flues: 70.2 m^{2} (756 sq ft)
  - Total surface: 172.3 m^{2} (1,855 sq ft)
- Superheater
  - Heating area: 65.4 m^{2} (704 sq ft)
- Cylinders: Two, outside
- Cylinder size: 600 mm × 660 mm (23 5/8 in × 26 in)
- Train heating: Steam
- Loco brake: Knorr
Performance figures
- Maximum speed: forwards: 80 km/h (50 mph); backwards: 50 km/h (31 mph)
- Indicated power: 2,000 PS (1,470 kW; 1,970 hp)
Career
- Operators: Deutsche Reichsbahn (GDR)
- Numbers: DR 52 8001 – 52 8200
- Retired: In service until the end of steam traction in the DR, approximately 1988

The Rekolokomotives of DR Class 52.80 first appeared in 1960 in service with Deutsche Reichsbahn in East Germany as extensive rebuilds of the wartime locomotives or Kriegslokomotiven of DRB Class 52 built by Nazi Germany. This modernisation, described as 'reconstruction' (Rekonstruktion, hence Rekolokomotive), extended to almost all of the components and systems on the engine.

== Overview ==
This reconstruction should not be confused with the general repair of a number of locomotives, which was also carried out in the Stendal Reichsbahn repair shop (Reichsbahnausbesserungswerk or RAW) from 1959 onwards. Under that programme, only the refinements omitted during wartime were added back, and worn-out components — or those which were too small (again for wartime austerity reasons) — were replaced. Usually, only the firebox and pony trucks were replaced. These refurbished engines retained their original numbers, however the Rekoloks were reorganised irrespective of their original numbers into sub-class 52.80.

For economic reasons, the general repair programme was cut back. Nevertheless, in early summer 1960, work began on the reconstruction of Class 52 at RAW Stendal. Up to 1967, 200 locomotives were rebuilt with a slightly modified Typ 50E combustion-chambered boiler, originally designed for Class 50.35. Other notable features of the Rekolok were new, welded cylinders, an IfS/DR mixer-preheater system, and new driver's cab front walls with oval windows, mainly on account of the new boiler. The intention to replace the entire cab, and provide the engines with new tenders did not come about. The worn-out Class 2'2'T30 tub tenders were mainly given new tubs.

Other reconstruction measures included the installation of axle box tightening wedges and the replacement of the Krauss-Helmholtz bogies. Despite often-expressed views to the contrary, the valves were not replaced or rebuilt as part of the reconstruction. The 52.80 had standard piston valves with Winterthur pressure equalisation, and hence poor riding qualities when running light. Not until the 1980s were Trofimoff valves and cylinder safety valves installed on some locomotives at RAW Meiningen. This improved the riding performance hugely when the engines ran without a train, something which was also noticeable in terms of savings in lubricants and fuel.

Some locomotives were also fitted with Giesl-Gieslingen suction draught systems, the so-called Giesl ejectors. However, for licensing reasons, these were removed once they had worn out or become defective.

== Surviving locomotives ==
Of the originally 200 locomotives reconstructed, a large number are still in existence in the hands of various owners in varying condition (see List of preserved steam locomotives in Germany). As of August 2007, ten working examples are known of.

Rekolok Number 52 8055 was extensively rebuilt, using advanced steam technology, oil firing and roller bearings for both axles and the drive by the Swiss company Dampflokomotiv- und Maschinenfabrik DLM AG in 1998. Since 2003, it is owned by its rebuilder DLM AG, and based in Schaffhausen, Switzerland. Being equipped with automatic trainstop of both Signum and ETCS-LS types, it is fully certified for operation on the Swiss standard-gauge network. Number 52 8055 also has an unknown five-chime steam whistle, and a Crosby three-chime whistle that was usually used on LNER Class A4s.

== Gallery ==
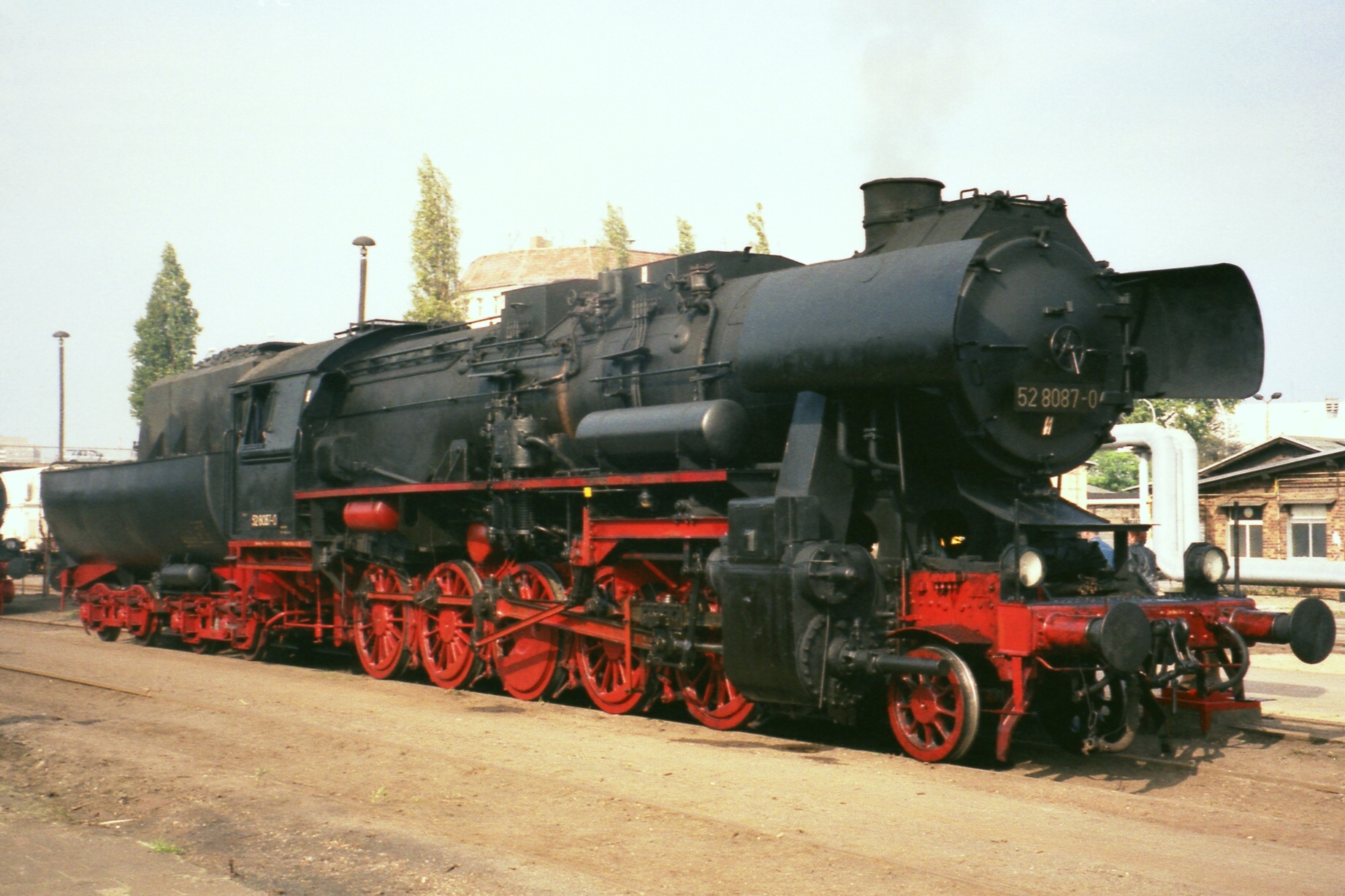
DR 52 8087 at RAW Berlin-Schöneweide

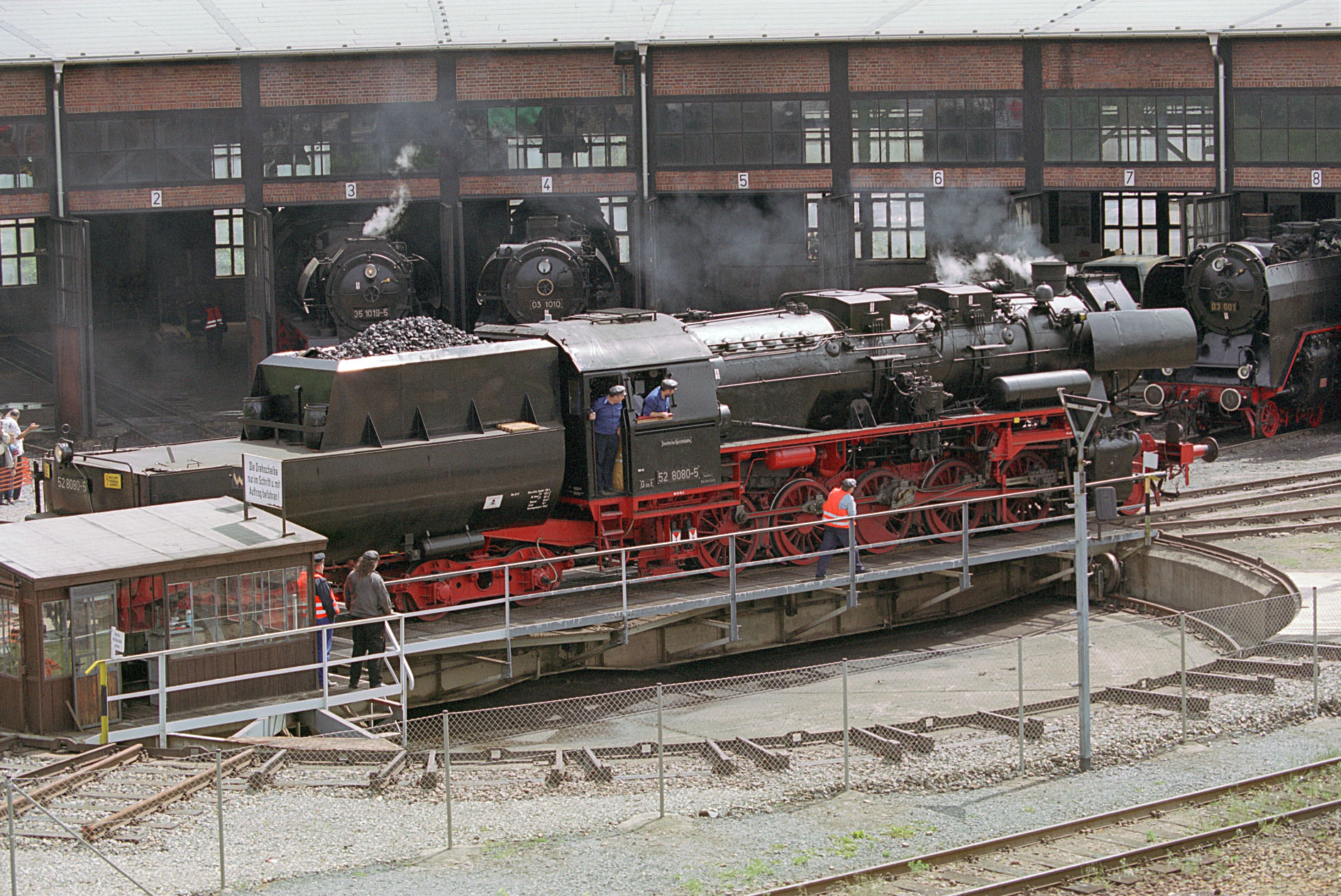
Rekolok DR 52 8080 at Bw Dresden-Altstadt

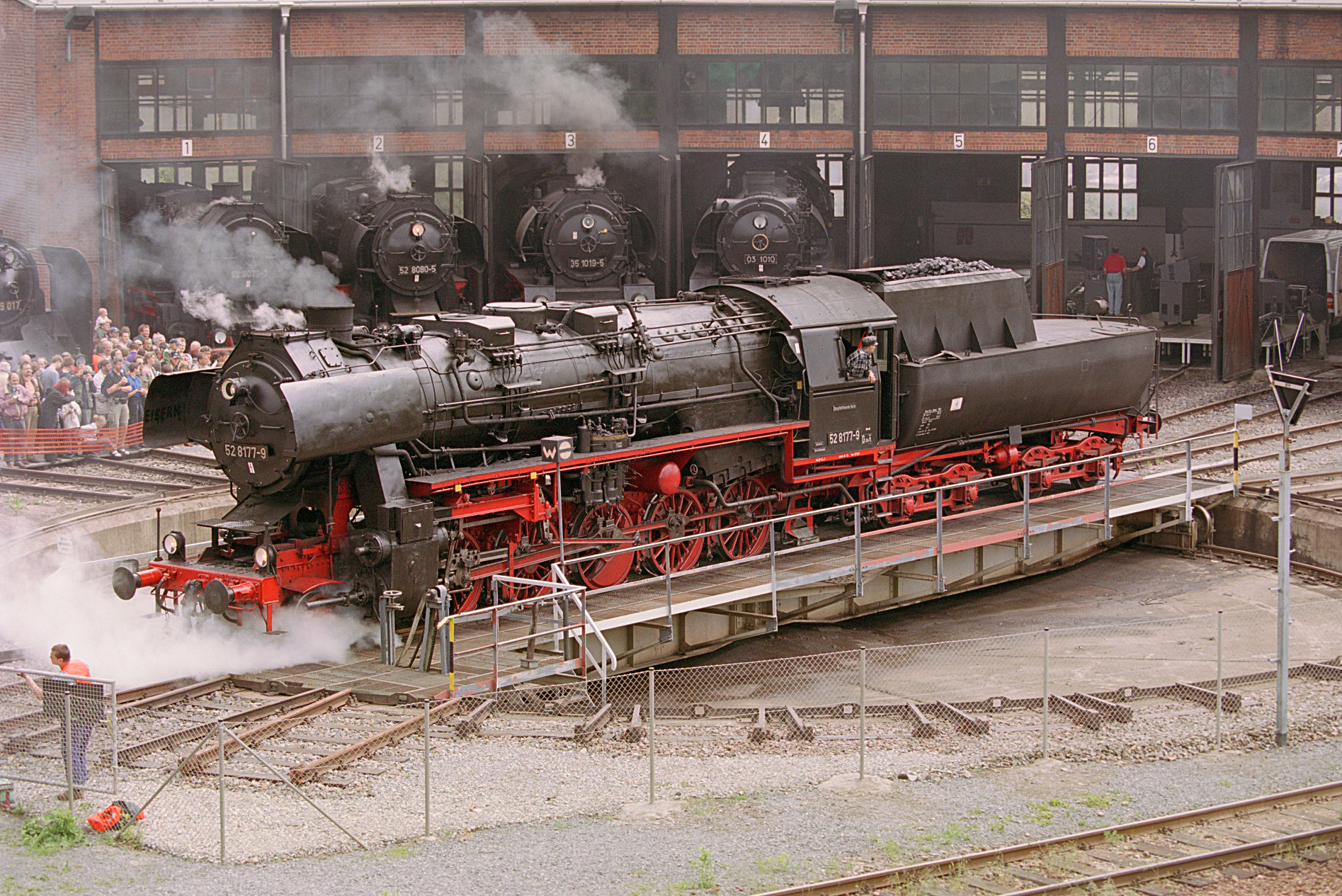
Rekolok DR 52 8177 at Bw Dresden-Altstadt

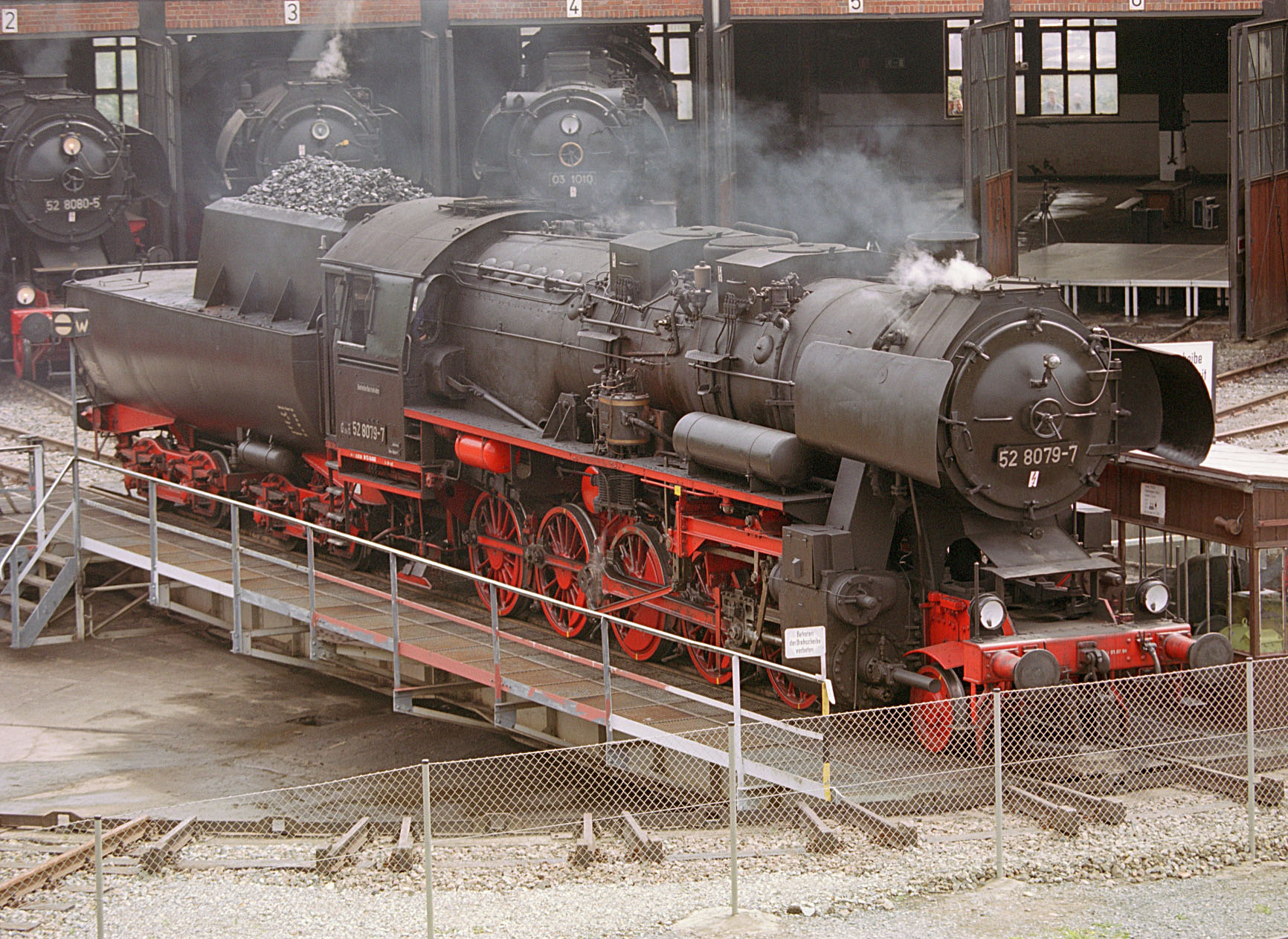
Rekolok DR 52 8079 on the turntable at the railway museum Bw Dresden-Altstadt

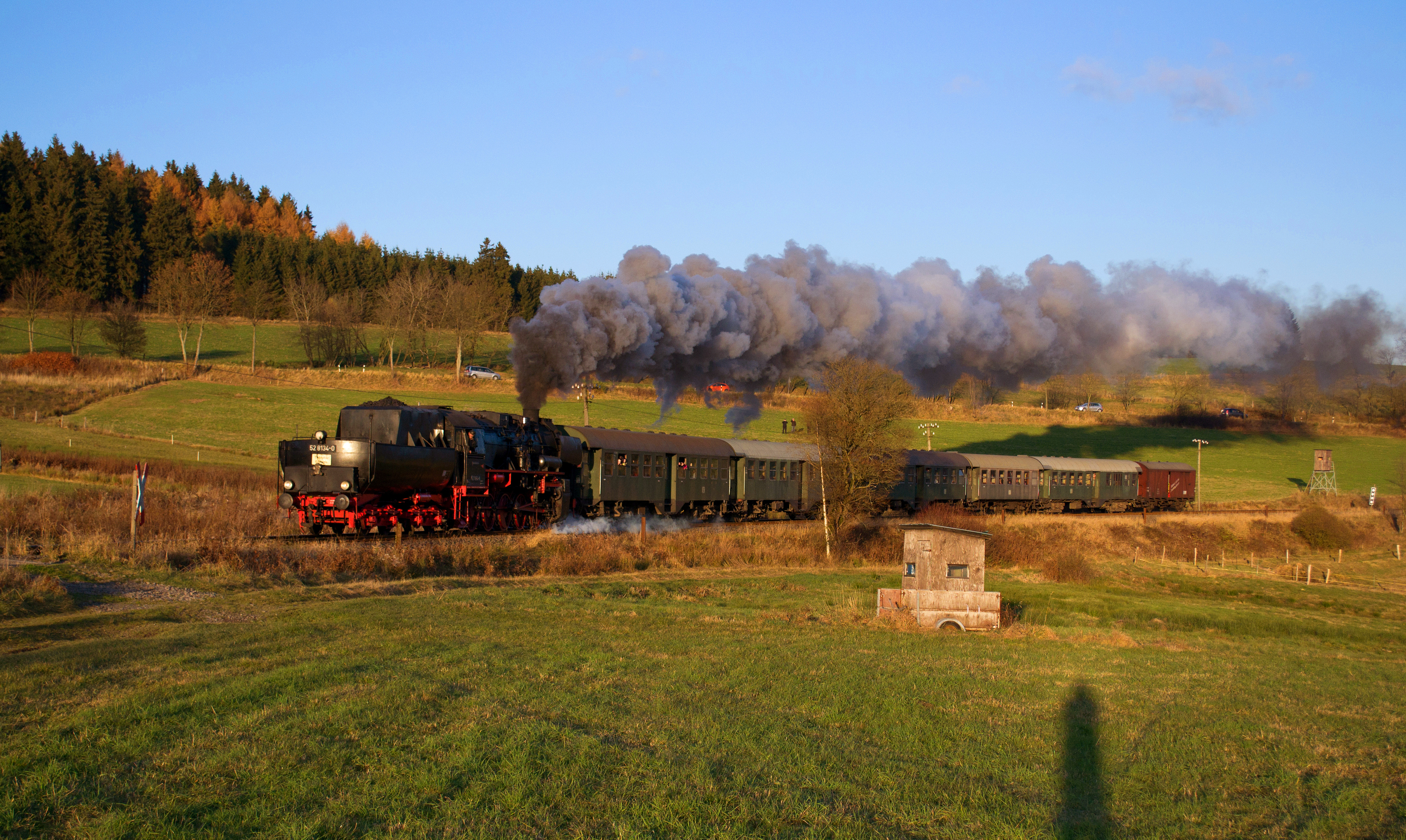
52 8134 with a charter train of Eisenbahnfreunde Betzdorf in Hilchenbach-Lützel

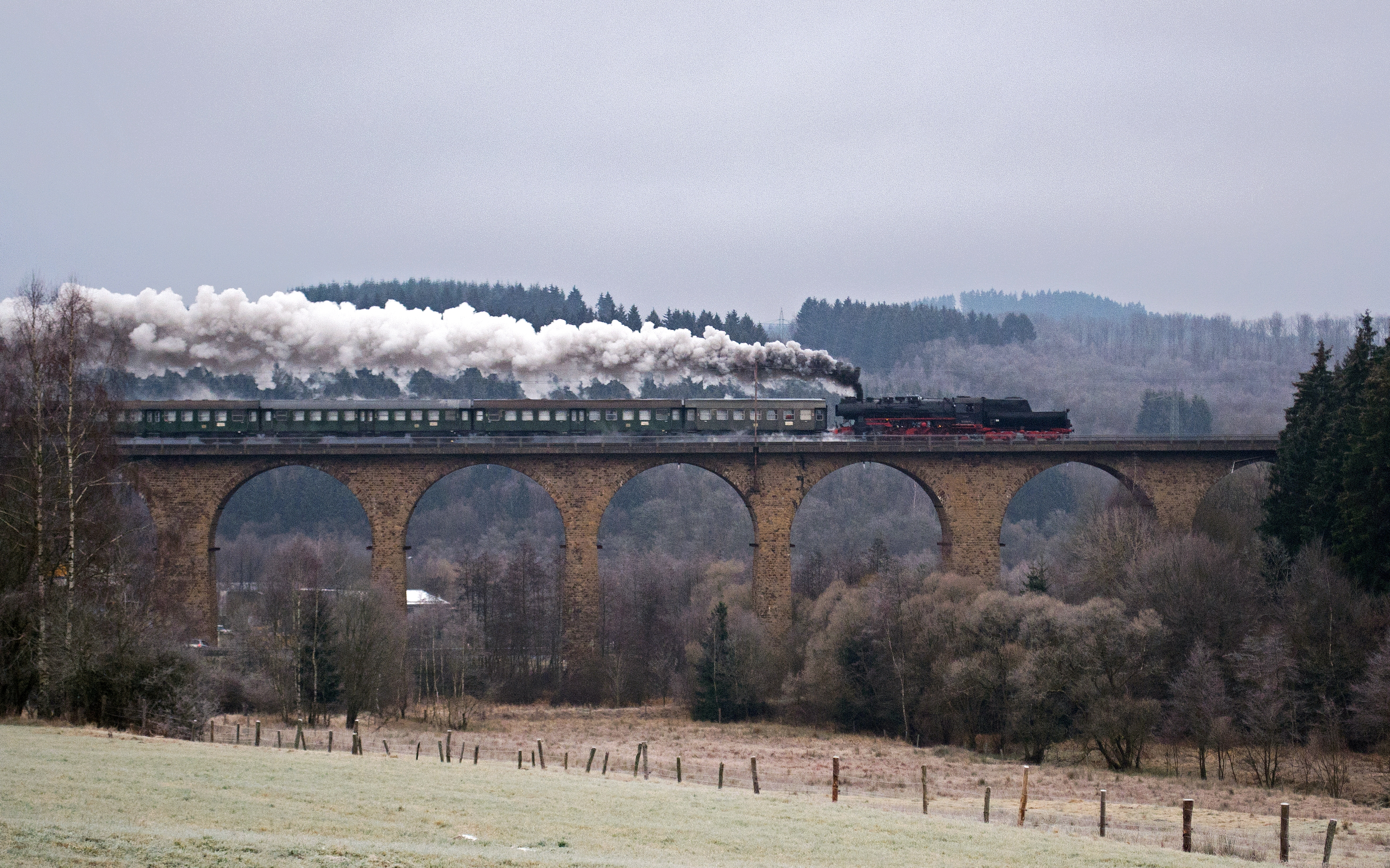
A charter train with 52 8134 on the viaduct at Rudersdorf in December 2012

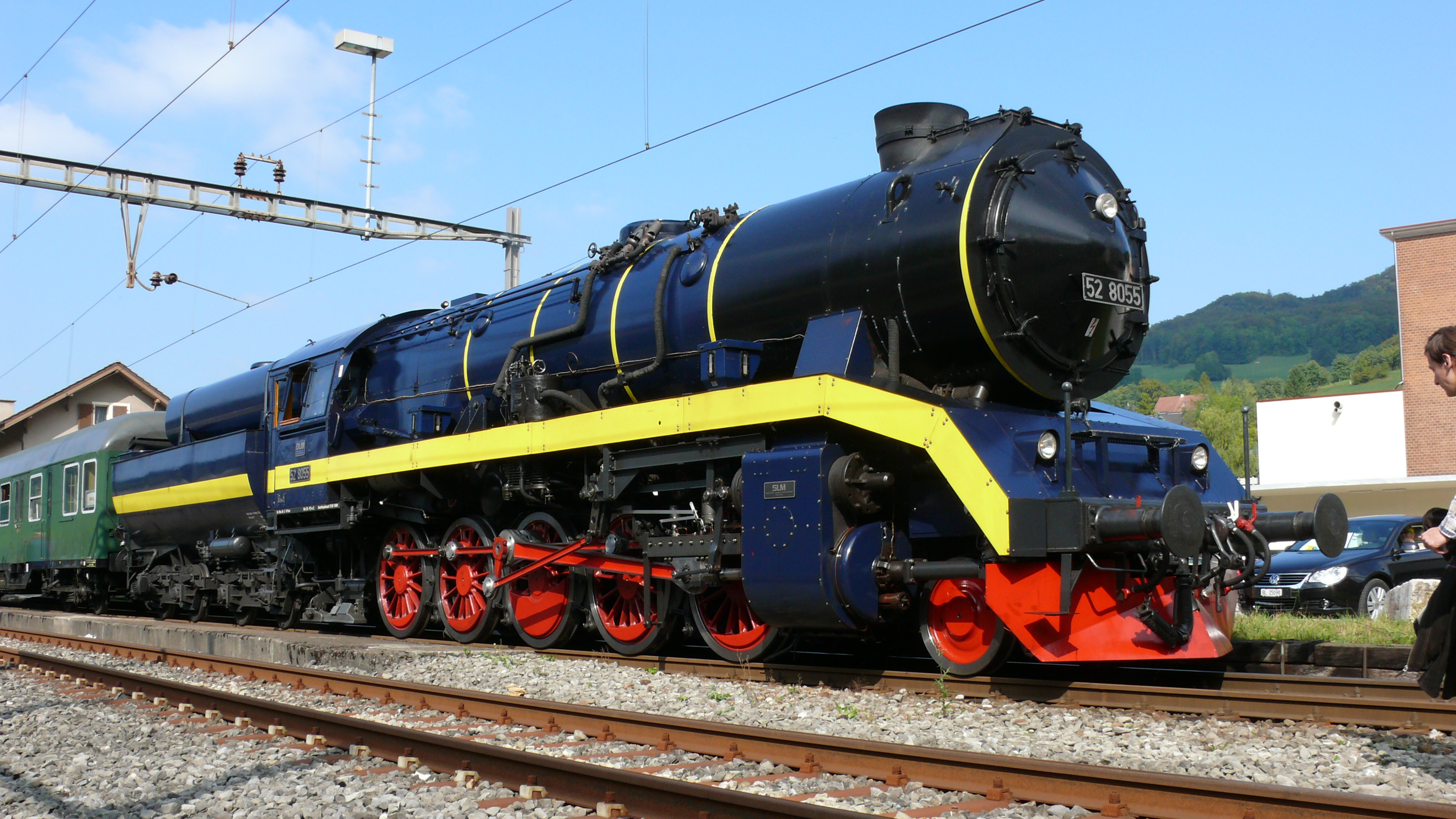
The most up-to-date class 52, the completely rebuilt 52 8055 in service on the Hauenstein line for a demonstration week.

== See also ==
- Deutsche Reichsbahn (East Germany)
- List of East German Deutsche Reichsbahn locomotives and railbuses
- DRB Class 52
- Rekolok
- List of preserved steam locomotives in Germany
