= List of East German Deutsche Reichsbahn locomotives and railbuses =

Emblem of the Deutsche Reichsbahn (East Germany)

This article contains a list of locomotives and railbuses of the Deutsche Reichsbahn (East Germany) (DR) according to the numbering system introduced by the DR on 1 July 1970.

Following the October 1990 reunification of Germany, the DR's locomotives and railbuses were incorporated (and renumbered) on 1 January 1992 into the classification system of the West German Deutsche Bundesbahn (DB), originally issued on 1 January 1968, in preparation for the merger of the two German national railways that took place on 1 January 1994. This renumbering was also described as the 'locomotive classification of the Deutsche Bahn' as a number of changes and additions to the DB's 1968 system were needed.

Classification before 1970: see also DRG classification system.

== Steam locomotives ==
In the DR numbering plan the following additional practices were common:

- xx.6xxx locomotives, that originated from former private railways.

From 1970 the following sub-classes for all steam locomotives were introduced, the locomotive number always being four digits long:

- xx.0 locomotives with oil-firing
- xx.1–8 locomotives with grate firing
- xx.9 locomotives with coal dust firing

Class		Original class or type	Axle arrangement (UIC)	Sub-class	Remarks
to 1970	from 1970	Original class or type	Axle arrangement (UIC)	Sub-class	Remarks
Express train tender locomotives
01.0–2	01.2	Einheitslok	2′C1′	S 36.20	
01.5	01.0, 01.1	Rekolok	2′C1′	S 36.20	
03.0–2	03.2	Einheitslok	2′C1′	S 36.18	
03.0–2	03.2	Rekolok	2′C1′	S 36.18	
03.10		Einheitslok	2′C1′	S 36.18	
03.10	03.0, 03.1	Rekolok	2′C1′	S 36.18	
07.10		Rebuild from SNCF 231-E	2′C1′	S 36.18	One-off
08.10		Rebuild from SNCF 241-A	2′D1′	S 47.19	One-off
17.10–12		Prussian S 10.1	2′C	S 35.17	
18.0		Saxon XVIII H	2′C1′	S 36.17	
18 201	02 0201	Neubaulok	2′C1′	S 36.20	One-off
18 314	02 0314	Rekolok	2′C1′	S 36.19	One-off
19.0		Saxon XX HV	1′D1′	S 46.17	
19.0	04.0	Rekolok	1′D1′	S 46.18	
Passenger train tender locomotives
22	39	Rekolok	1′D1′	P 46.18	
23		Einheitslok	1′C1′	P 35.18	
23	35.2	Rekolok	1′C1′	P 35.18	
23.10	35.1	Neubaulok	1′C1′	P 35.18	
24	37	Einheitslok	1′C	P 34.15	
25		Neubaulok	1′D	P 45.17	One-off, Rebuilt to 25 1002
25.10		Neubaulok	1′D	P 45.18	
36.0–4		Prussian P 4.2	2′B	P 24.15	
38.2	38.5	Saxon XII H2	2′C	P 35.15	
38.10–40	38.1–4	Prussian P 8	2′C	P 35.17	
39		Prussian P 10	1′D1′	P 46.19	Rekolok classified as BR 22
Goods train tender locomotives
41	41	Einheitslok	1′D1′	G 46.18, G 46.20	
41	41	Rekolok	1′D1′	G 46.18	
42		Kriegslokomotive	1′E	G 56.17	
43		Einheitslok	1′E	G 56.20	
44	44.0; 44.1–2; 44.9	Einheitslok	1′E	G 56.20	Oil firing Coal dust firing
H 45		Rebuild from Einheitslok 45	1′E1′	G 57.20 bzw. G 57.18	One-off, Cannibalised for 18 201
50	50.10–31	Einheitslok	1′E	G 56.15	
50.35–37	50.35–37	Rekolok	1′E	G 56.15	
50.40	50.4	Neubaulok	1′E	G 56.15	
50.50	50.0	Rekolok with oil firing	1′E	G 56.15	
52	52.10–77	Kriegslok	1′E	G 56.15	
52.80	52.80	Rekolok	1′E	G 56.15	
52	52.90	DR rebuild	1′E	G 56.15	Coal dust firing
55.0–6		Prussian G 7.1	D	G 44.13	
55.7–8		Prussian G 7.2	D	G 44.13	
55.16–22		Prussian G 8	D	G 44.14	
55.25–56		Prussian G 8.1	D	G 44.17	
56.1		Prussian G 8.3	1′D	G 45.17	
56.2–8		Prussian G 8.1 with carrying axle Mecklenburg G 8.1 with carrying axle	1′D	G 45.17	
56.20–29	56.20–29	Prussian G 8.2; Oldenburg G 8.2	1′D	G 45.17	
57.10–35	57.13–32	Prussian G 10	E	G 55.15	
58.2–5, 10–21	58.11–13; 58.14 - 58.10–21	Baden G 12; Saxon XIII H (variant 1919); Württemberg G 12; Prussian G 12	1′E	G 56.17	
58.30	58.30	Rekolok; Prussian G 12	1′E	G 56.17	
Passenger train tank locomotives
60		ex Lübeck-Büchener Eisenbahn	1′B1′	St 24.18, St 24.19	
61		Einheitslok	2′C3′	St 38.18	One-off, 61 002 rebuilt to 18 201
62	62	Einheitslok	2′C2′	Pt 37.20	
64	64	Einheitslok	1′C1′	Pt 35.15	
65.10	65	Neubaulok	1′D2′	Pt 47.18	3 locomotives exists, 65.1049 in use
70.1		Baden I g	1B	Pt 23.15	70 125 One-off
71.3		Saxon IV T	1′B1′	Pt 24.16	
72.0–3		Prussian T 5.2	2′B	Pt 24.17	One-off 72 001, ex ELE
74.0–3		Prussian T 11	1′C	Pt 34.16	
74.4–13		Prussian T 12	1′C	Pt 34.18	
75.0-3		Baden VI b	1′C1′	Pt 34.15	
75.4, 10–11		Baden VI c	1′C1′	Pt 34.16	
75.5	75.5	Saxon XIV HT	1′C1′	Pt 34.17	
77.1		Palatine Pt 3/6, Bavarian Pt 3/6	1′C2′	Pt 36.16	One-off
78.0–5	78	Prussian T 18, Württemberg T 18	2′C2′	Pt 37.17	
79		Rebuild AL/SNCF 242 TA	2′D2′	Pt 48.16	One-off
Goods train tank locomotives
80		Einheitslok	C	Gt 33.17	
83.10	83	Neubaulok	1′D2′	Gt 55.18	only 27 Locomotives was produced
84		Einheitslok	1′E1′	Gt 57.20	
86	86	Einheitslok	1′D1′	Gt 46.15	Also procured as ÜK (Übergangskriegslok)
89.0		Einheitslok	C	Gt 33.16	
89.2		Saxon V T	C	Gt 33.14	
89.2		Saxon V T	C	Gt 33.14	Last series with shortened wheelbase
89.6		Bavarian D II.II	C	Gt 33.15	
89.7		Bavarian R 3/3	C	Gt 33.15	
89.8		Bavarian R 3/3	C	Gt 33.16	DRG copy
89.62		Prussian T 3	C	G 33.10	T3 with tender
89.64		Prussian T 7	C	Gt 33.12	One-off (89 6401)
89.70–75	89	Prussian T 3	C	Gt 33.10, Gt 33.11, Gt 33.12	
90		Prussian T 9.1	1′C	Gt 34.14	
91.3–18		Prussian T 9.3	1′C	Gt 34.15	
91.19, 64		Mecklenburg T 4	1′C	Gt 34.11, Gt 34.12, Gt 34.13	
91.20		Württemberg T 9	1′C	Gt 34.15	
92.2–3		Baden X b.1-7	D	Gt 44.15, Gt 44.16	
92.4		Prussian T 13.1	D	Gt 44.15, Gt 44.16	
92.5–10		Prussian T 13, Oldenburg T 13	D	Gt 44.15, Gt 44.16	
93.0–4	93.8	Prussian T 14	1′D1′ t	Gt 46.16	
93.5–12	93	Prussian T 14.1; Württemberg T 14	1′D1′ t	Gt 46.17	
94.2–4		Prussian T 16	E	Gt 55.15	
94.5–17	94	Prussian T 16.1	E	Gt 55.17	
94.20–21	94	Saxon XI HT	E	Gt 55.16	
95.0		Prussian T 20	1′E1′	Gt 57.19	
95.66		HBE Tierklasse	1′E1′	Gt 57.16	
96		Bavarian Gt 2x4/4	D′D	Gt 88.15, Gt 88.16	
98	98		various		Lokalbahn and branch line locomotives
Narrow gauge steam locomotives
99	99		various		Narrow gauge locomotives

== Diesel locomotives and small locomotives ==
DR class		DB class	Axle arrangement (UIC)	Type of drive	Remarks
to 1970	from 1970	from 1992	Axle arrangement (UIC)	Type of drive	Remarks
Kö	100.0		B	Mechanical	
Kö	100.1–7	310	B	Mechanical	
Köf	100.8–9	310	B	Hydraulic	
V 15	101.1–3	311	B	Hydraulic	
	101.5–7	311	B	Hydraulic	Rebuild motor
V 23	102.0	312	B	Hydraulic	
	102.1	312	B	Hydraulic	
V 36	103		C	Hydraulic	
	104	344	D	Hydraulic	Down-rated conversions of BR 105/106
	105	345	D	Hydraulic	Overflow of the BR 106
V 60	106	346	D	Hydraulic	
	(105/106)	347	D	Hydraulic	Russian broad gauge, Mukran/Sassnitz ferry port station
V 75	107		Bo′Bo′	Electric	
	108	298	B′B′	Hydrodynamic	
V 100	110	201	B′B′	Hydraulic	1000 HP, 100 km/h, with steam train heating
	111	293	B′B′	Hydraulic	1000 HP, 100 km/h, with steam train heating
	112	202	B′B′	Hydraulic	1200 HP, 100 km/h, with steam train heating
	114	204	B′B′	Hydraulic	1400 HP, 100 km/h, with steam train heating
	115		B′B′	Hydraulic	1500 HP, 100 km/h, For a short time the correct class was BR 114
V 180	118.0–1, 5	228.0–1, 5	B′B′	Hydraulic	1800 or 2000 HP, 120 km/h, Some with rebuild motor 118.5 from 118.0, with steam train heating
V 180	118.2–4, 6–8	228.2–4, 6-8	C′C′	Hydraulic	120 km/h, Some with rebuild motor 118.6–8 from 118.2–4
	119	219	C′C′	Hydraulic	2700 HP, 120 km/h, Changed front from locomotive 116, with electrical train heating
V 200	120	220	Co′Co′	Electric	2000 HP, 100 km/h, without train heating, Nickname in GDR: "Taiga Drum"
V 300	130	230	Co′Co′	Electric	3000 HP, 140 km/h, 80 locomotives without, 2 (test version) with electrical train heating
	131	231	Co′Co′	Electric	3000 HP, 100 km/h, without electrical train heating, 76 locomotives
	132	232	Co′Co′	Electric	3000 HP, 120 km/h, with electrical train heating, 709 locomotives
	142	242	Co′Co′	Electric	4000 HP, 120 km/h, with electrical train heating, 6 locomotives
Köf 6001, 6003	199.0*	399.0	C	Hydraulic	199 001 (100 901), 199 002 (100 902), 750 mm gauge
Kö 6002			C	Mechanical	750 mm gauge
Kö 6004			C	Mechanical	750 mm gauge
Kö 6005			B	Mechanical	Ns 3, 750 mm gauge type
Kö 6501, 6502	199.0*		B	mechanical	Ns 3, 100 903 (199 003I, 199 991), 100 904 (199 004I, 199 992), 1,000 mm gauge
	199.0*		C	Mechanical	199 005 and 006 (100 905 & 100 906), 1,000 mm gauge
	199.0*		C	Mechanical	199 007, 008, 750 mm gauge
Kö	199.0*	399.1	B	mechanical	199 003II, 004II, 010–012, Kö II re-gauged, 1,000 mm gauge
	199.1*		C	Mechanical	199 101, 102, 600 mm gauge
	199.1*		C	Mechanical	199 103, 600 mm gauge
Kb 040.			B	Mechanical	Kb 0401–0409, 600 mm gauge
V 30 C	199.3*	399.1	C	Hydraulic	(103 901) 1,000 mm gauge
	199.8	299.8	C′C′	Hydraulic	1,000 mm gauge
V 36K			B′B′	Hydraulic	750 mm gauge

* The classification 199 was first introduced in 1973 .

== Diesel railbuses ==
DR class		DB class	Axle arrangement (UIC)	Type of drive	Remarks
to 1970	from 1970	from 1992	Axle arrangement (UIC)	Type of drive	Remarks
VT 2.09	171	771	1A	Mechanical	Railbus
VT 2.09.01	172.0	772.0	1A	Mechanical	Railbus
VT 2.09.02	172.1	772.1	1A	Mechanical	Railbus
		772.3	1A	Hydromechanical	Rebuild from driving coach
VT 4.12	173		(1A)(A1)	Mechanical	Bautzen variant
VT 18.16	175	675	B′2′+…+2′B′	Hydraulic	Görlitz variant, 160 km/h
VT 12.14	181		(1 B)2′+…+2′(B1)	Mechanical	Ganz variant
SVT 137.2+8	182			electric	DRG Köln variant
SVT 137	183			div.	DRG Hamburg and Leipzig variant
VT 137.2	184			div.	DRG Ruhr variant
VT 137.5	185		Some were (1A)(A1)	div.	Some were private railway railbuses
VT 135	186		Some were 1A	div.	Some were private railway railbuses
VT 133.5/VT 137.5	187		div.	Mechanical	Private railway railbus, Narrow gauge, e. g. NWE T 3, GHE T 1, FKB T 1 and 2
ORT 135.7	188.0	708.0	A1	mechanical	Catenary inspection railbus (Oberleitungsrevisionstriebwagen or ORT)
VT 137.7	188.1	723.1	2′Bo′	Electric	Radio measurement vehicle (FMT)
ORT 137.7	188.2	708.2	(1A)2′	Mechanical	Catenary inspection railbus (Oberleitungsrevisionstriebwagen or ORT)
	188.3	708.3	B′2′	Hydraulic	Catenary inspection railbus (Oberleitungsrevisionstriebwagen or ORT)

== Electric locomotives ==
With the exception of the BR 251 all locomotives are designed for 15 kV/16.7 Hz AC.

DR class		DB class	Axle arrangement (UIC)	Remarks
to 1970	from 1970	from 1992	Axle arrangement (UIC)	Remarks
E 04	204		1′Co1′	
E 05			1′Co1′	
E 11	211	109	Bo′Bo′	
	212	112	Bo′Bo′	
E 17			1′Do1′	
E 18	218		1′Do1′	
E 21			2′Do1′	
	230	180	Bo′Bo′	Twin system locomotive (15 kV, 16.7 Hz AC / 3 kV DC) for international servies in Czechoslovakia, identical with the ČSD 372
E 42	242	142	Bo′Bo′	
	243	143	Bo′Bo′	5000 HP, 125 km/h
E 44	244		Bo′Bo′	
	250	155	Co′Co′	7000 HP; 120 km/h
E 251	251	171	Co′Co′	25 kV, 50 Hz AC (Rübeland Railway)
	252	156	Co′Co′	7967 HP, 160 km/h, delivered after 1990.
E 94	254		Co′Co′	the "German crocodile"
E 77			(1′B)(B1′)	
E 95	(255)		1′Co+Co 1′	No longer renumbered
E 191	–		B′B′	600 V DC; 1,000 mm (Narrow gauge line Klingenthal–Sachsenberg-Georgenthal)

== Electric railcars ==
Class							
Railbus		Driving coach		Trailer coach		DB class	
to 1969	from 1970	to 1969	from 1970	to 1969	from 1970	from 1992	Remarks
ET 25	285	–		–		–	
ET 25.2	285.2	–		–		–	
ET 125	276.0	–		EB 125	276	476/876	S-Bahn Berlin
ET 165	275	ES 165	275	EB 165	275	475/875	S-Bahn Berlin
ET 166	276.0	–		EB 166	276	476/876	S-Bahn Berlin
ET 167	277	–		EB 167	277	477/877	S-Bahn Berlin
ET 168	278	ES 168	278	–		478/878	S-Bahn Berlin
ET 169	–	–		EB 169	–	–	S-Bahn Berlin
ET 170.0	278.2	–		–		–	Experimental train for the S-Bahn Berlin
–	270	–		–	270	485/885	New build for S-Bahn Berlin
–	–	–		–	–	480	New build for S-Bahn Berlin, ordered by the BVG, placed in service by the DR
ET 188.5	279	–		EB 188.5	279.0	479/879	Buckower Kleinbahn
ET 188.5	–	–		EB 188.5	–	–	Passenger railbus Schleizer Kleinbahn
ET 188.5	–	–		–		–	Luggage railbus Schleizer Kleinbahn
ET 188.5	279.2	–		–		–	Oberweißbacher Bergbahn
ET 188.7	279.2	–		–		479.2	Oberweißbacher Bergbahn
–	280	–		–		–	2 prototypes for S-Bahn lines in the GDR
ET 197 21/22	–	–		EB 197	–	–	Klingenthal narrow gauge line
ET 198 01/02	–	–		EB 198 01/02	–	–	Klingenthal narrow gauge line
ET 198 03/04	–	–		EB 198 03/04	–	–	Klingenthalr narrow gauge line
ET 198 05/06	–	–		EB 198 05/06	–	–	Klingenthal narrow gauge line

== Accumulator cars ==
Class
to 1969	from 1970	Remarks
AT 585–592, 613/614		Employed in the Gotha area

== See also ==
- Deutsche Reichsbahn (East Germany)
- UIC classification

== Literature ==
Franz Rittig, Manfred Weisbrod: Baureihe 232 – Die berühmte Ludmilla (= Eisenbahn Journal Extra. Ausgabe 2 / 2012). Verlagsgruppe Bahn, Fürstenfeldbruck 2012, ISBN 978-3-89610-363-5

Klaus-Jürgen Halle: Die Großdiesellokomotive V 180 – Das Erfolgsmodell aus Babelsberg. In: Die Deutsche Reichsbahn – 45 Jahre Eisenbahngeschichte in der DDR, Kapitel 5.2, Ausgabe 1 / 2012, Geramond-Verlag, Gilching
