= Nauen (disambiguation) =

Nauen is a town in the Havelland district, Brandenburg, Germany.

Nauen may also refer to:

- Nauener Tor, one of the three preserved gates of Potsdam
- Nauen Transmitter Station, oldest transmitting plant in the world, located in Brandenburg, Germany
- Nauen Radio Station, developed by Germany physicist Georg von Arco (1869–1940)
- Nauen line, railway track serving Narrow gauge small locomotives of the Deutsche Reichsbahn
