= DR Class 22 =

Class of East German steam locomotives

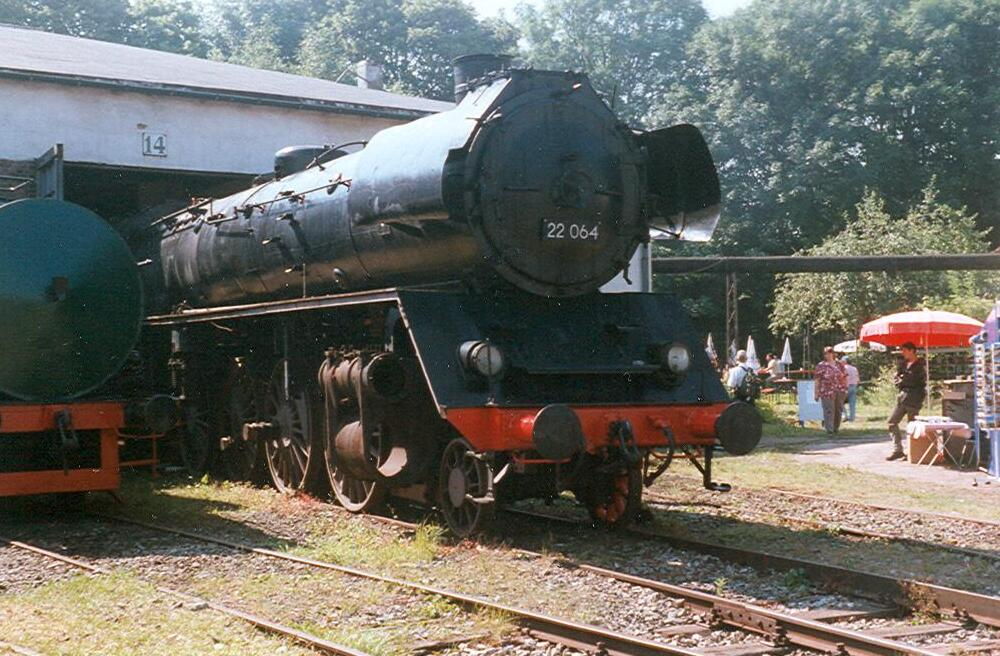
- 22 064 in the Bavarian Railway Museum, 1998
Type and origin
- Power type: Steam
- Builder: RAW Meiningen
- Build date: 1958–1962
- Total produced: 85
Specifications
- Configuration
  - Whyte: 2-8-2
  - UIC: 1′D1′ h3
  - German: P 46.18
- Driver: All cylinders to 2nd
- Gauge: 1,435 mm (4 ft 8 1/2 in)
- Leading dia.: 1,000 mm (3 ft 3 1/4 in)
- Driver dia.: 1,750 mm (5 ft 8 7/8 in)
- Trailing dia.: 1,100 mm (3 ft 7 1/4 in)
- Tender wheels: 1,000 mm (3 ft 3 1/4 in)
- Wheelbase
  - Axle spacing (Asymmetrical): 2,800 mm (9 ft 2 1/4 in) +; 2,000 mm (6 ft 6 3/4 in) +; 2,000 mm (6 ft 6 3/4 in) +; 2,000 mm (6 ft 6 3/4 in) +; 3,350 mm (11 ft 0 in) =
  - Engine: 12,150 mm (39 ft 10 1/4 in)
  - Tender: 1,900 mm (6 ft 2 3/4 in) +; 1,900 mm (6 ft 2 3/4 in) +; 1,900 mm (6 ft 2 3/4 in) =; 5,700 mm (18 ft 8 1/2 in)
  - incl. tender: 20,070 mm (65 ft 10 1/4 in)
- Length
  - Over headstocks: 22,400 mm (73 ft 5 7/8 in)
  - Over buffers: 23,700 mm (77 ft 9 1/8 in)
- Height: 4,500 mm (14 ft 9 3/16 in)
- Axle load: 18.5 t (18.2 long tons; 20.4 short tons)
- Adhesive weight: 74.0 t (72.8 long tons; 81.6 short tons)
- Empty weight: 96.4 t (94.9 long tons; 106.3 short tons)
- Service weight: 107.5 t (105.8 long tons; 118.5 short tons)
- Tender type: 2′2′ T 32/34 (22 001 with 2′2 T 30 from 25 001)
- Fuel type: Coal
- Fuel capacity: 10 t (9.8 long tons; 11 short tons)
- Water cap.: 2′2′ T 32: 32.0 m^{3} (7,000 imp gal; 8,500 US gal); 2′2′ T 34: 34.0 m^{3} (7,500 imp gal; 9,000 US gal); 2′2′ T 30: 30.0 m^{3} (6,600 imp gal; 7,900 US gal)
- Firebox
  - Grate area: 4.23 m^{2} (45.5 sq ft)
- Boiler
  - Pitch: 3,050 mm (10 ft 1/8 in)
  - Tube plates: 5,700 mm (18 ft 8 3/8 in)
  - Small tubes: 54 mm (2 1/8 in), 112 off
  - Large tubes: 143 mm (5 5/8 in), 36 off
- Boiler pressure: 16 bar (16.3 kgf/cm^{2}; 232 psi)
- Heating surface
  - Firebox: 21.3 m^{2} (229 sq ft)
  - Tubes: 98.3 m^{2} (1,058 sq ft)
  - Flues: 86.7 m^{2} (933 sq ft)
  - Total surface: 206.3 m^{2} (2,221 sq ft)
- Superheater
  - Heating area: 83.8 m^{2} (902 sq ft)
- Cylinders: Three
- Cylinder size: 520 mm × 660 mm (20 1/2 in × 26 in)
- Valve gear: Outside Heusinger (Walschaerts) with Winterthur slide
- Train heating: Steam
Performance figures
- Maximum speed: 110 km/h (68 mph)
- Indicated power: 1,690 PS (1,240 kW; 1,670 hp)
Career
- Operators: Deutsche Reichsbahn
- Numbers: 22 001 – 22 085
- Retired: 1971

The steam locomotives of DR Class 22 were reconstructed passenger train locomotives in service with the Deutsche Reichsbahn in East Germany after the Second World War.

These engines were rebuilt from DRG Class 39.0-2 locomotives and appeared between 1958 and 1962 as part of the reconstruction programme. The latter had a significant problem: the boiler did not generate enough steam and the steam pipes were too winding, which considerably reduced the maximum power of the engine. A total of 85 examples were equipped with a new combustion-chambered boiler with an IfS mixer-preheater. The locomotive frame had to be extended to accommodate the new engine. The wider outer firebox meant that the driver's cab needed a modified rear wall. The locomotives were given operating numbers 22 001–085 and were mainly homed in the Reichsbahn divisions of Dresden and Erfurt.

The DR employed the locomotives on heavy express train duties in the schedules for the DRG Class 01, which led to overloading of the original components (frame cracks, piston damage). As a result, early retirement followed. In 1968, 50 of the 85 Reko boilers from the Class 22 were used for the reconstruction of the DRG Class 03.

In 1970 the engines were allocated to Class 39 under the DR's new computerised numbering scheme. However, in 1970 only a few machines were still working, at Halberstadt and Saalfeld. In 1971 the last one was withdrawn. Up to the early 1990s, nine engines were used as steam generators.

The vehicles were equipped with 2′2′ T 32 or 2′2′ T 34 tenders.

== See also ==
- List of East German Deutsche Reichsbahn locomotives and railbuses
- Rekolok
- List of preserved steam locomotives in Germany
