= DR Class 25.10 =

Passenger train locomotive

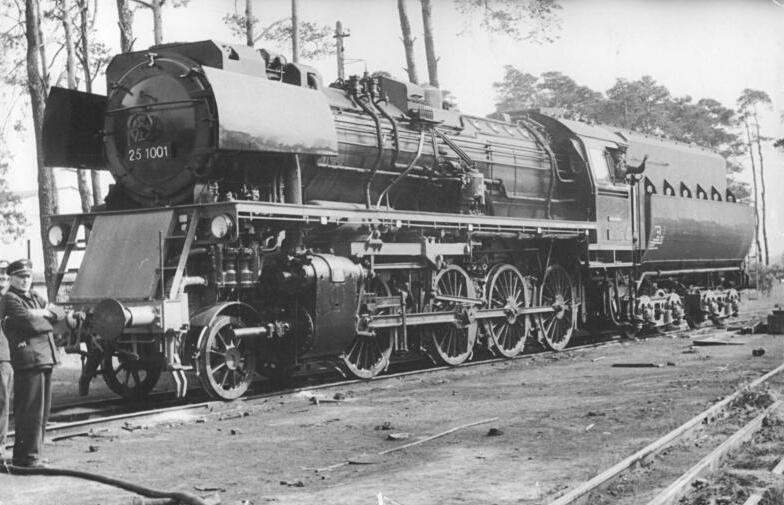
- 25 1001 fitted for coal dust firing
Type and origin
- Power type: Steam
- Builder: LKM Babelsberg
- Serial number: 120011/1, 120011/2
- Build date: 1954–1955
- Total produced: 2
Specifications
- Configuration
  - Whyte: 2-8-0
  - UIC: 1′D h2
  - German: 25 001: P 45.17; 25 1001: P 45.18
- Gauge: 1,435 mm (4 ft 8 1/2 in)
- Leading dia.: 1,000 mm (3 ft 3 3/8 in)
- Driver dia.: 1,600 mm (5 ft 3 in)
- Tender wheels: 1,000 mm (3 ft 3 3/8 in)
- Wheelbase
  - Axle spacing (Asymmetrical): 3,100 mm (10 ft 2 in) +; 2,600 mm (8 ft 6 3/8 in) +; 2,000 mm (6 ft 6 3/4 in) +; 2,000 mm (6 ft 6 3/4 in) =
  - Engine: 9,700 mm (31 ft 9 7/8 in)
  - Tender: 2′2′ T 30: 5,800 mm (19 ft 3/8 in); 2′2′ T 27.5 Kst: 6,830 mm (22 ft 4 7/8 in); 2′2′ T 28 Kst: 5,700 mm (18 ft 8 3/8 in)
  - Tender bogie: 1,900 mm (6 ft 2 3/4 in)
  - incl. tender: 25 001: 18,765 mm (61 ft 6 3/4 in); 25 1001: 19,885 mm (65 ft 2 7/8 in)
- Length
  - Over buffers: 25 001: 22,695 mm (74 ft 5 1/2 in); 25 1001: 23,835 mm (78 ft 2 3/8 in)
- Height: 4,475 mm (14 ft 8 1/8 in)
- Axle load: 25 001: 17.6 t (17.3 long tons; 19.4 short tons); 25 1001: 18.0 t (17.7 long tons; 19.8 short tons)
- Adhesive weight: 25 001: 70.4 t (69.3 long tons; 77.6 short tons); 25 1001: 72.0 t (70.9 long tons; 79.4 short tons)
- Empty weight: 25 001: 77.3 t (76.1 long tons; 85.2 short tons); 25 1001: 79.6 t (78.3 long tons; 87.7 short tons)
- Service weight: 25 001: 86.1 t (84.7 long tons; 94.9 short tons); 25 1001: 89.0 t (87.6 long tons; 98.1 short tons)
- Tender type: 25 001: 2′2′ T 30; (as 25 1002: 2′2 T 28 Kst); 25 1001: 2′2′ T 27.5 (Kst)
- Fuel type: 25 001: Hard coal; (as 25 1002: brown coal dust; 25 1001: brown coal dust
- Fuel capacity: 25 001: 10 t (9.8 long tons; 11 short tons); 25 1001: 26 m^{3} (920 cu ft) – c. 18.5 t (18.2 long tons; 20.4 short tons)
- Water cap.: 27.5–30.0 m^{3} (6,000–6,600 imp gal; 7,300–7,900 US gal)
- Firebox
  - Grate area: 25 001: 3.87 m^{2} (41.7 sq ft); 25 1001: 3.76 m^{2} (40.5 sq ft)
- Boiler
  - Tube plates: 25 001: 4,700 mm (15 ft 5 in); 25 1001: 4,350 mm (14 ft 3 1/4 in)
  - Small tubes: 25 001: 51 mm (2 in), 132 off; 25 1001: 44.5 mm (1 3/4 in), 146 off
  - Large tubes: 133 mm (5 1/4 in), 35 off
- Boiler pressure: 16 bar (16.3 kgf/cm^{2}; 232 psi)
- Heating surface
  - Firebox: 25 001: 17.5 m^{2} (188 sq ft); 25 1001: 20.0 m^{2} (215 sq ft)
  - Tubes: 25 001: 89.7 m^{2} (966 sq ft); 25 1001: 78.8 m^{2} (848 sq ft)
  - Flues: 25 001: 64.6 m^{2} (695 sq ft); 25 1001: 59.8 m^{2} (644 sq ft)
  - Total surface: 25 001: 171.8 m^{2} (1,849 sq ft); 25 1001: 158.6 m^{2} (1,707 sq ft)
- Superheater
  - Heating area: 25 001: 61.0 m^{2} (657 sq ft); 25 1001: 65.0 m^{2} (700 sq ft)
- Cylinders: Two, outside
- Cylinder size: 600 mm × 660 mm (23 5/8 in × 26 in)
Performance figures
- Maximum speed: 100 km/h (62 mph)
- Indicated power: 2,380 PS (1,750 kW; 2,350 hp)
Career
- Operators: Deutsche Reichsbahn (GDR)
- Numbers: 25 001 (→ 25 1002), 25 1001
- Retired: 1967

The steam locomotives of DR Class 25.10 were passenger train locomotives built for the Deutsche Reichsbahn (DR) in East Germany after World War II.

== History ==
The Class 25.10 was developed by the DR in 1954. It was built primarily with heavy passenger trains in mind, but was also intended to handle goods traffic. The first of the two trials locomotives to be manufactured was equipped with a mechanical stoker for lump coal. It was given the operating number 25 001. The second example had coal dust firing and was allocated number 25 1001. Only the coal dust fired vehicle was convincing enough, which resulted in the conversion of the first engine to coal dust firing as well in 1958 and its renumbering to 25 1002. The engines did not go into full production however, because the DR Class 23.10 had been designed and built. The makers were the VEB Lokomotivbau "Karl Marx" in Potsdam-Babelsberg.

The two engines were mainly stationed at Arnstadt, where they hauled passenger trains to Weimar, Saalfeld, Erfurt and Meiningen. For a short time, from 1960 to 1962, the engines were homed at Senftenberg depot. However the numerous cracks in the plate frame often required repair and the locomotives were frequently out of service. The 25.10s were retired as early as 1964 and scrapped at Nordhausen in 1968.

Number 25 1001 was equipped with a coal dust tender of Class 2′2′ T 27.5 Kst. Number 25 001 had a 2′2′ T 30 tender, which was replaced in 1958 by the 2′2′ T 28 Kst coal dust tender of 44 054, when it was converted to coal dust firing. The locomotive was renumbered to 25 1002.

== See also ==
- List of East German Deutsche Reichsbahn locomotives and railbuses
- Neubaulok
