= DRG Class 56.2–8 =

DRG Class 56.2–8 DB Class 056 DR Class 56.1 ÖBB 656 PKP Class Tr5
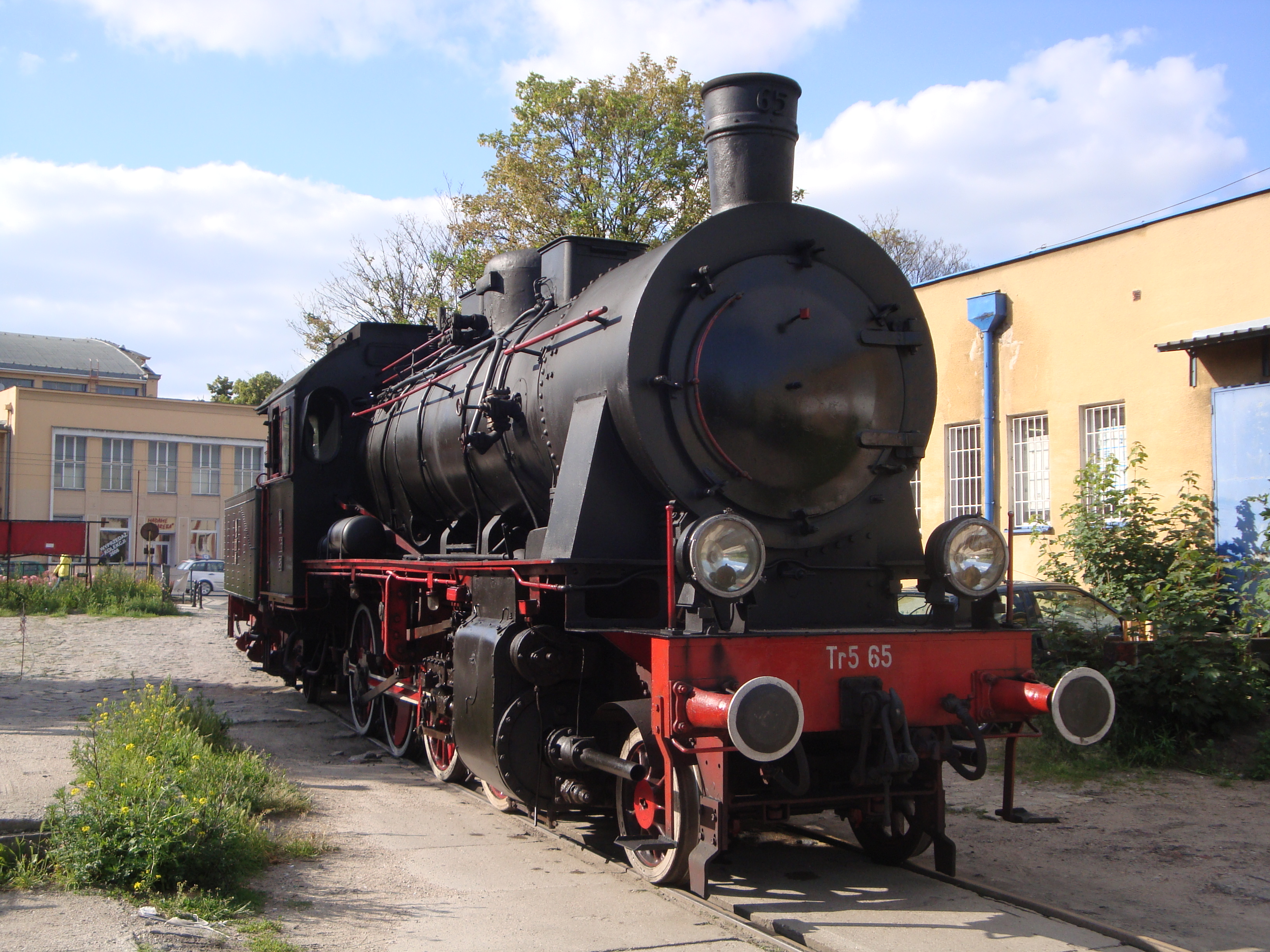
- Polish Tr5-65
Type and origin
- Power type: Steam
- Rebuild date: 1934–1941
- Number rebuilt: 691
Specifications
- Configuration
  - Whyte: 2-8-0
  - UIC: 1′D h2
  - German: G 45.16
- Gauge: 1,435 mm (4 ft 8 1/2 in)
- Leading dia.: 800 mm (2 ft 7 1/2 in)
- Driver dia.: 1,350 mm (4 ft 5 1/8 in)
- Tender wheels: 1,000 mm (3 ft 3 3/8 in)
- Wheelbase
  - Axle spacing (Asymmetrical): 2,500 mm (8 ft 2 3/8 in) +; 1,570 mm (5 ft 1 3/4 in) +; 1,560 mm (5 ft 1 3/8 in) +; 1,570 mm (5 ft 1 3/4 in) =
  - Engine: 7,200 mm (23 ft 7 1/2 in)
  - Tender: 2,400 mm (7 ft 10 1/2 in) +; 2,000 mm (6 ft 6 3/4 in) =; 4,400 mm (14 ft 5 1/4 in)
  - incl. tender: 14,935 mm (49 ft 0 in)
- Length
  - Over headstocks: 16,996 mm (55 ft 9 1/8 in)
  - Over buffers: 18,296 mm (60 ft 3/8 in)
- Height: 4,550 mm (14 ft 11 1/8 in)
- Axle load: 16.0 t (15.7 long tons; 17.6 short tons)
- Adhesive weight: 64.1 t (63.1 long tons; 70.7 short tons)
- Empty weight: 68.9 t (67.8 long tons; 75.9 short tons)
- Service weight: 74.6 t (73.4 long tons; 82.2 short tons)
- Tender type: pr. 3 T 16.5
- Fuel type: Coal
- Fuel capacity: 7 t (6.9 long tons; 7.7 short tons)
- Water cap.: 16.5 m^{3} (3,630 imp gal; 4,360 US gal)
- Firebox
  - Grate area: 2.7 m^{2} (29 sq ft)
- Boiler
  - Pitch: 2,780 mm (9 ft 1 1/2 in)
  - Tube plates: 4,500 mm (14 ft 9 1/8 in)
  - Small tubes: 51 mm (2 in), 130 off
  - Large tubes: 133 mm (5 1/4 in), 24 off
- Boiler pressure: 14 bar (14.3 kgf/cm^{2}; 203 psi)
- Heating surface
  - Firebox: 13.9 m^{2} (150 sq ft)
  - Tubes: 90.3 m^{2} (972 sq ft)
  - Flues: 42.1 m^{2} (453 sq ft)
  - Total surface: 143.6 m^{2} (1,546 sq ft)
- Superheater
  - Heating area: 51.9 m^{2} (559 sq ft)
- Cylinders: Two, outside
- Cylinder size: 600 mm × 660 mm (23 5/8 in × 26 in)
Performance figures
- Maximum speed: forwards: 70 km/h (43 mph); backwards: 50 km/h (31 mph)
- Indicated power: 1,260 PS (927 kW; 1,240 hp)
Career
- Numbers: 56 201 – 56 891
- Retired: 1970

Between 1934 and 1941 the Deutsche Reichsbahn (DRG) converted 691 former Prussian-built Class 55.25–56 steam locomotives; the result was the DRG Class 56.2–8. The carrying axle enabled higher speeds, and the engine could be used as a passenger train locomotive. In addition the average axle load was lower, so that these locomotives could also be used on branch lines. The conversion entailed moving the boiler forward and raising it somewhat. The vehicles were given operating numbers between 56 201 and 56 891, although the numbering was not continuous.

The Deutsche Bundesbahn took over 368 of the 410 remaining engines after the Second World War and retired them by 1968. The last one was 56 241, that was to have been allocated the number 056 241–3. The East German Deutsche Reichsbahn retired their last locomotives (now called the DR Class 56.1) by the end of 1970.

Numbers 56 218, 258, 317, 543 and 598 remained in Austria after the war, locomotives 56 317 and 543 retiring as early as 1953. The remaining engines formed the Austrian ÖBB Class 656. All three were withdrawn by 1956.

The engines left in Poland after 1945 were given the PKP classification Tr5. One locomotive, the Tr5-65, ex 55 5607, is preserved at Wolsztyn.

Two engines of this type were 'forgotten' by the Germans in Winterslag, Belgium in 1944 and registered in November 1944 with the Belgian State Railways NMBS-SNCB as type 29, later type 82 (from 01.01.1946). No 82.001, former 2901, ex-56 262, ex 55 5211 with DRG was retired in 1946 (and probably never saw any real service nor its new number 82.001) No 82.002, former 2900, ex 56 205, ex 55 5005 with DRG was used in local goods trains around Schaerbeek. Both engines were given back to DB in May 1950. While 56 205 ran until 1957, 56 262 was withdrawn in 1951.

The vehicles were coupled with Prussian tenders of class 3 T 16.5, 3 T 20 or 2′2′ T 21.5.

== See also ==
- List of DRG locomotives and railbuses
- List of Prussian locomotives and railbuses
