= DRB Class 03.10 =

Class of German steam locomotives

DRB Class 03.10 PKP class Pm3
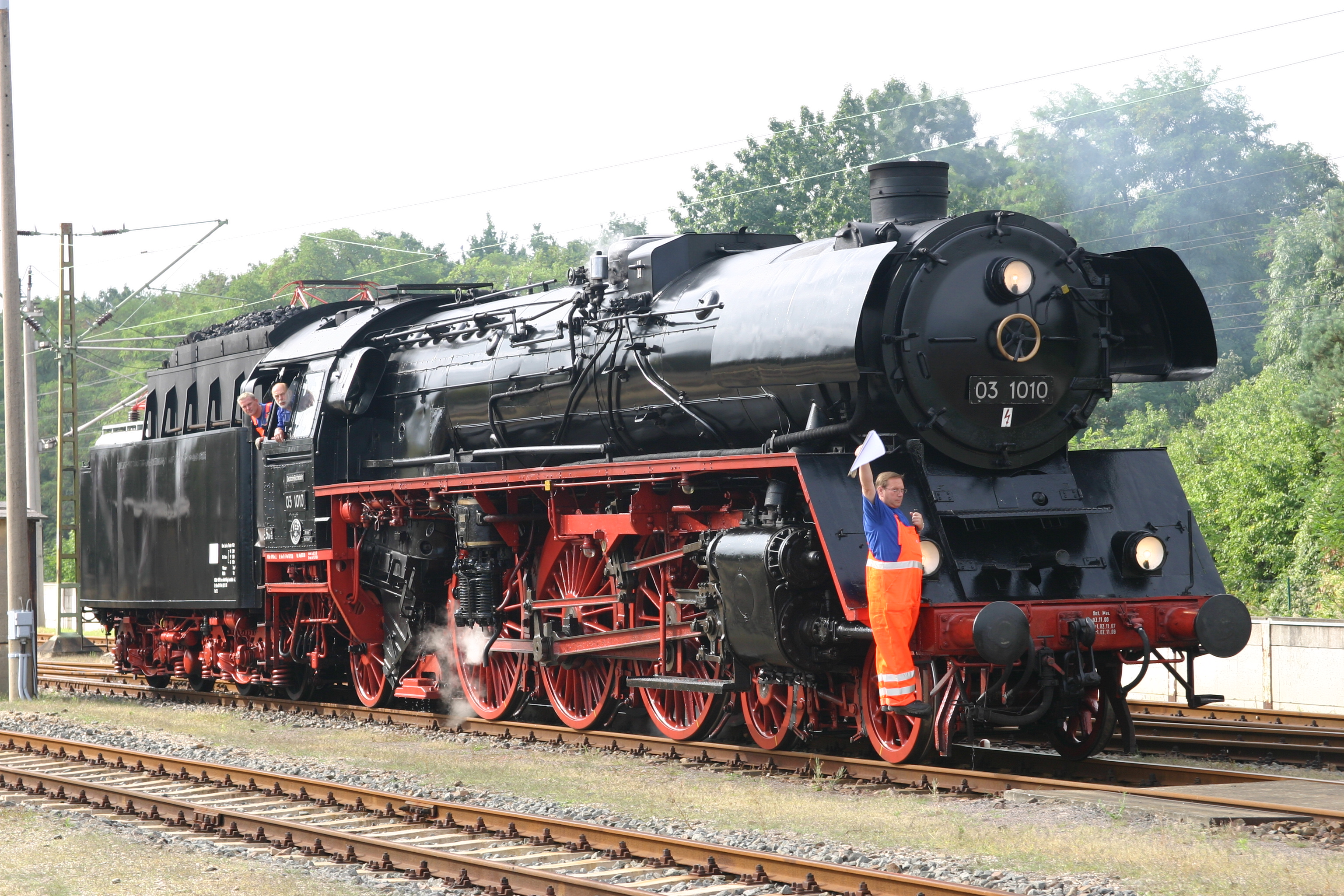
- DR 03 1010
Type and origin
- Power type: Steam
- Builder: Borsig (22); Krupp (18); Krauss-Maffei (20)
- Build date: 1939–1941
- Total produced: 60
Specifications
- Configuration
  - Whyte: 4-6-2
  - UIC: 2′C1′ h3
  - German: S 36.18
- Driver: Divided: inside cylinder on 1st, outside cylinders on 2nd
- Gauge: 1,435 mm (4 ft 8 1/2 in)
- Leading dia.: 1,000 mm (39 3/8 in)
- Driver dia.: 2,000 mm (78 3/4 in)
- Trailing dia.: 1,250 mm (49 1/4 in)
- Tender wheels: 1,000 mm (39 3/8 in)
- Wheelbase
  - Axle spacing (Asymmetrical): 2,200 mm (7 ft 2 5/8 in) +; 1,800 mm (5 ft 10 7/8 in) +; 2,250 mm (7 ft 4 5/8 in) +; 2,250 mm (7 ft 4 5/8 in) +; 3,500 mm (11 ft 5 3/4 in)
  - Engine: 12,000 mm (39 ft 4 1/2 in)
  - Tender: 5,700 mm (224 3/8 in)
  - Tender bogie: 1,900 mm (74 3/4 in)
  - incl. tender: 20,225 mm (66 ft 4 1/4 in)
- Length
  - Over headstocks: 22,605 mm (74 ft 2 in)
  - Over buffers: 23,905 mm (78 ft 5 1/8 in)
- Height: 4,550 mm (14 ft 11 1/8 in)
- Axle load: 18.33 t (18.04 long tons; 20.21 short tons)
- Adhesive weight: 54.98 t (54.11 long tons; 60.61 short tons)
- Empty weight: 93.8 t (92.3 long tons; 103.4 short tons)
- Service weight: 103.04 t (101.41 long tons; 113.58 short tons)
- Tender type: 2′2′ T 34 St
- Fuel type: Coal
- Fuel capacity: 10 tonnes (9.8 long tons; 11 short tons)
- Water cap.: 34 m^{3} (7,500 imp gal; 9,000 US gal)
- Firebox
  - Grate area: 3.9 m^{3} (140 cu ft)
- Boiler
  - Pitch: 3,100 mm (10 ft 2 in)
  - Tube plates: 6,800 mm (22 ft 3 3/4 in)
  - Small tubes: 70 mm (2 3/4 in), 85 off
  - Large tubes: 171 mm (6 3/4 in), 20 off
- Boiler pressure: 16 bar (16.3 kg/cm^{2}; 232 psi)
- Heating surface
  - Firebox: 15.9 m^{2} (171 sq ft)
  - Tubes: 117.88 m^{2} (1,268.8 sq ft)
  - Flues: 69.18 m^{2} (744.6 sq ft)
  - Total surface: 202.96 m^{2} (2,184.6 sq ft)
- Superheater
  - Heating area: 72.22 m^{2} (777.4 sq ft)
- Cylinders: Three
- Cylinder size: 470 mm × 660 mm (18 1/2 in × 26 in)
Performance figures
- Maximum speed: 140 km/h (87 mph)
- Indicated power: 1,790 PS (1,320 kW; 1,770 hp)
Career
- Numbers: 03 1001–1022, 1043–1060, 1073–1092
- Retired: DB: 1966; DR: 1981; PKP: 1968

The German Class 03.10 (Baureihe 03.10 or BR 03.10) engines were standard steam locomotives (Einheitsdampflokomotiven) belonging to the Deutsche Reichsbahn and designed for hauling express trains.

== History ==
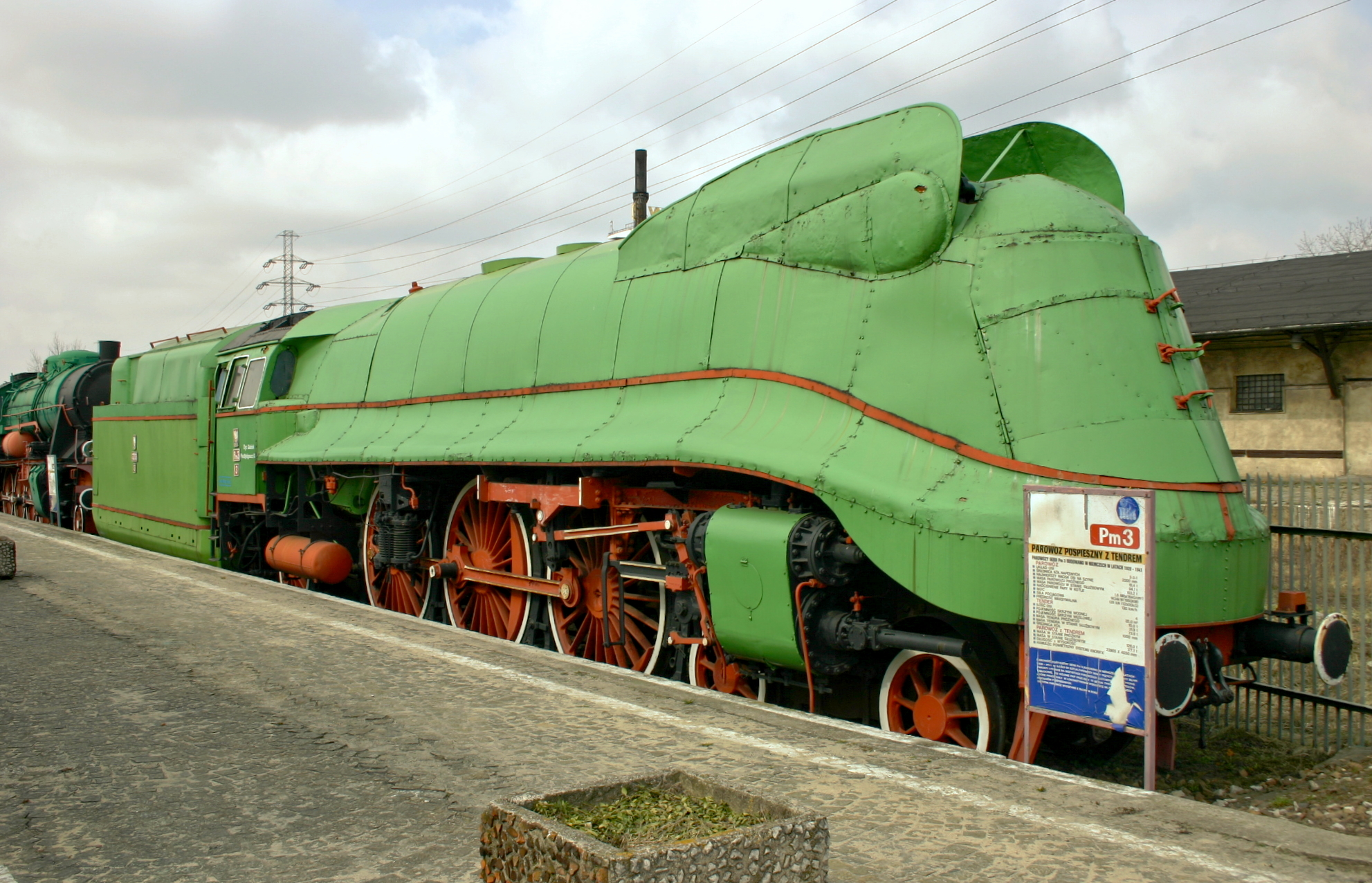
Pm3-5 as Pm3-3 with a 32D3-3 tender

The DRG's Class 03.10 engines were an evolutionary development from the Class 03 locomotives, comparable to those of Class 01.10 which had evolved from Class 01. The first 03.10 was built in 1939 and 140 units were to be manufactured. As a result of the Second World War and the switching of production to 'war essential' goods, only 60 vehicles were completed. Originally supplied with the 2'2 T38St standard tenders, the 03.10 could later be encountered coupled to 2'2'T34 tenders. The locomotives were mainly produced by the firms of Borsig, Krupp and Krauss-Maffei, and were fully enclosed by streamlining plates. The vehicles were given the operating numbers 03 1001 – 1022, 03 1043–1060 and 03 1073 – 1092.

After the war, 47 locomotives remained in Germany; 26 were taken over by the Deutsche Bundesbahn and 21 by the Deutsche Reichsbahn in East Germany. Ten other locomotives ended up with the Polish State Railways (PKP) as the Pm3. Two engines (03 1091 and 1092) had to be retired as early as 1944 due to war damage. The fate of 03 1002 is unknown. Because the top speed on main lines had to be reduced due to route damage, the streamlined shells became uneconomical, not least because they made maintenance more difficult, and they were removed from all the engines except the DR's 03 1087. Almost all the DR and DB locomotives were rebuilt. Only 03 1047, 1097 and 1086 (DR) had been retired before the reconstruction programme.

== The East German DR Rekoloks ==
The locomotives' boilers' condition worsened due to the use of non-aging St47K steel (on 10 October 1958 the boiler of locomotive 03 1046 exploded due to degrading), so the Deutsche Reichsbahn had to replace them with newly designed boilers. In addition, several other components were overhauled to make the engines more economical. Thus the term Rekolok ('reconstructed locomotive') is entirely accurate. A total of 16 engines were rebuilt in 1959. In 1952, 03 1087 was converted to the Wendler brown coal dust firing system. Because this type of firing was unsuccessful for passenger train services, it was re-converted in 1959.

From 1965 all the Rekoloks were converted to oil-firing except for 03 1057 and 1087. Until their retirement at the end of the 1970s the three-cylinder express engines were the spearhead of the DR's high-value express train services, covering up to 22,000 km (13,670 mi) per month. Number 03 1010 is a museum locomotive with the DB AG, stationed in Halle and frequently used in heritage services. It was re-converted to coal-firing. The non-operational, oil-fired 03 1090 is also preserved and is housed in the former locomotive depot (Bahnbetriebswerk or Bw) at Schwerin.

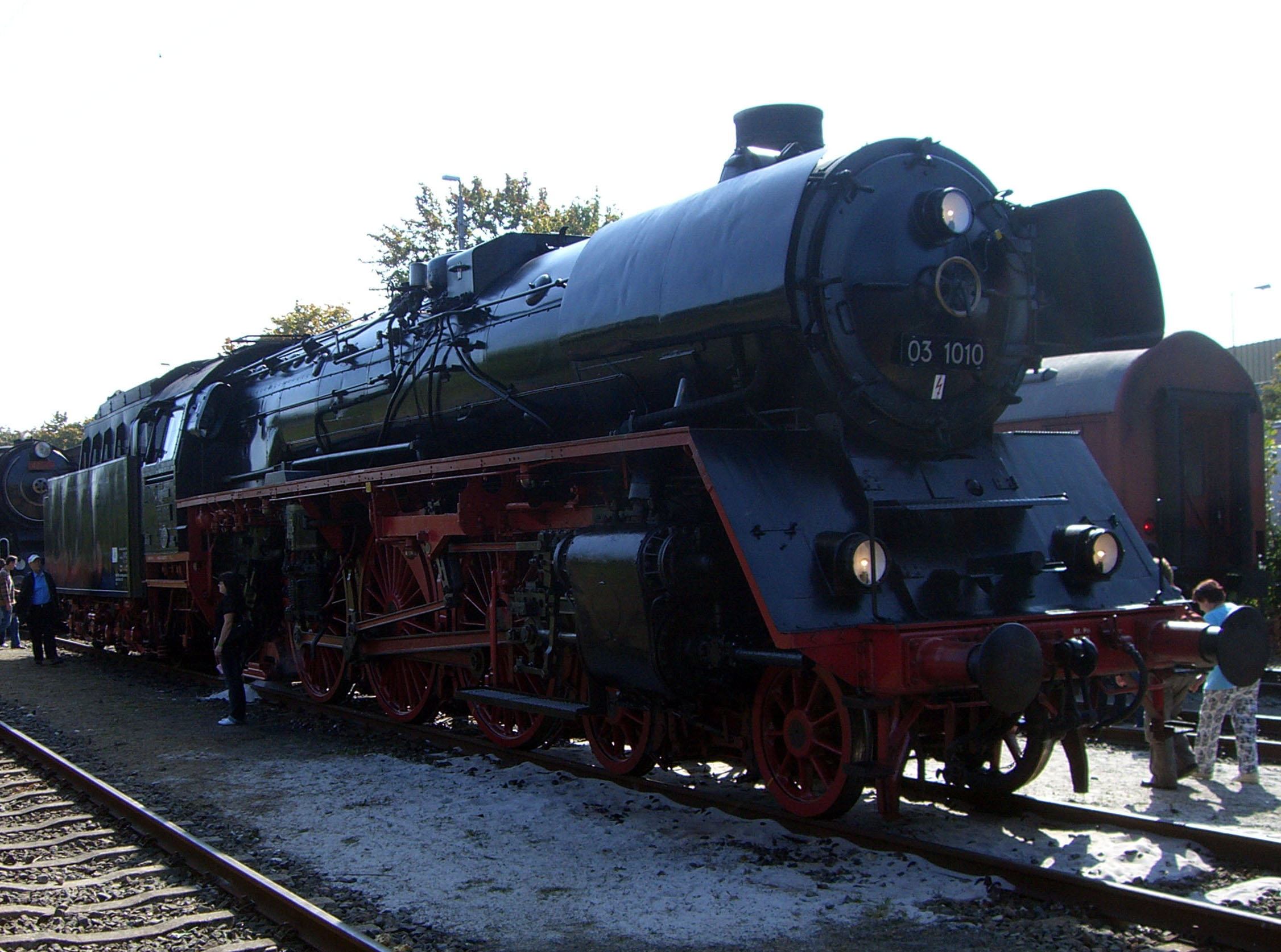
03 1010 from the side

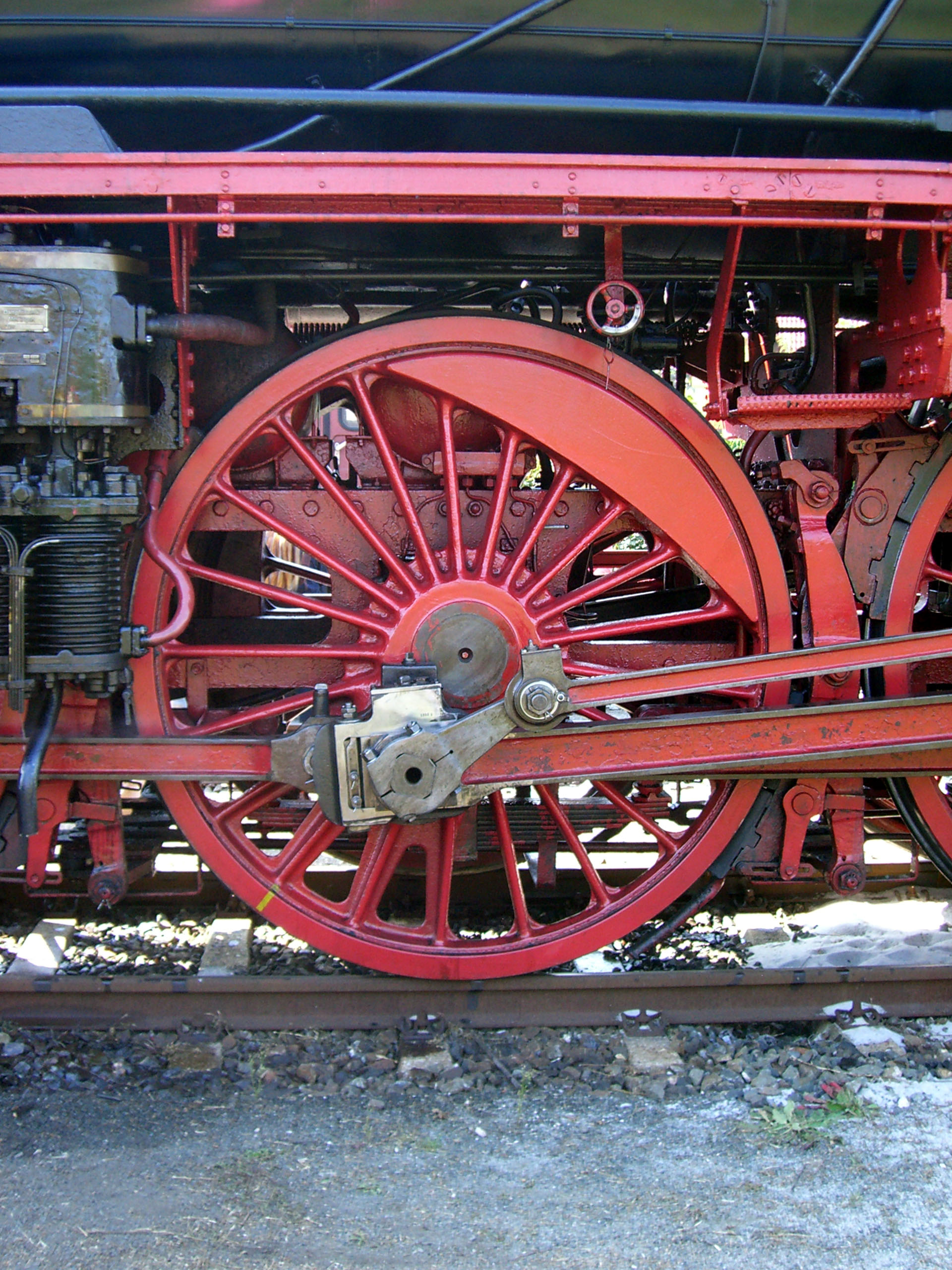
Driving wheelset

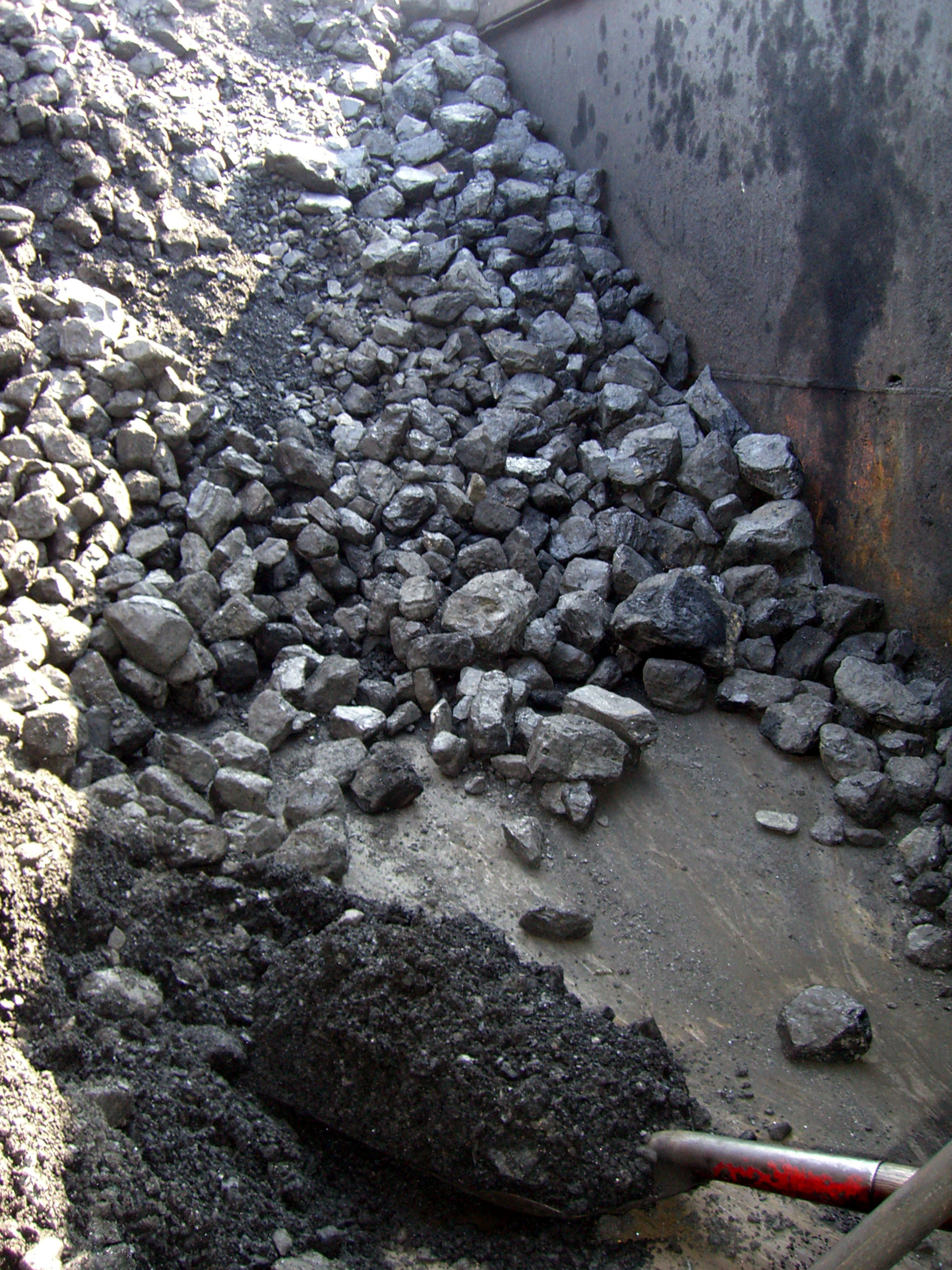
Interior of 03 1010's tender

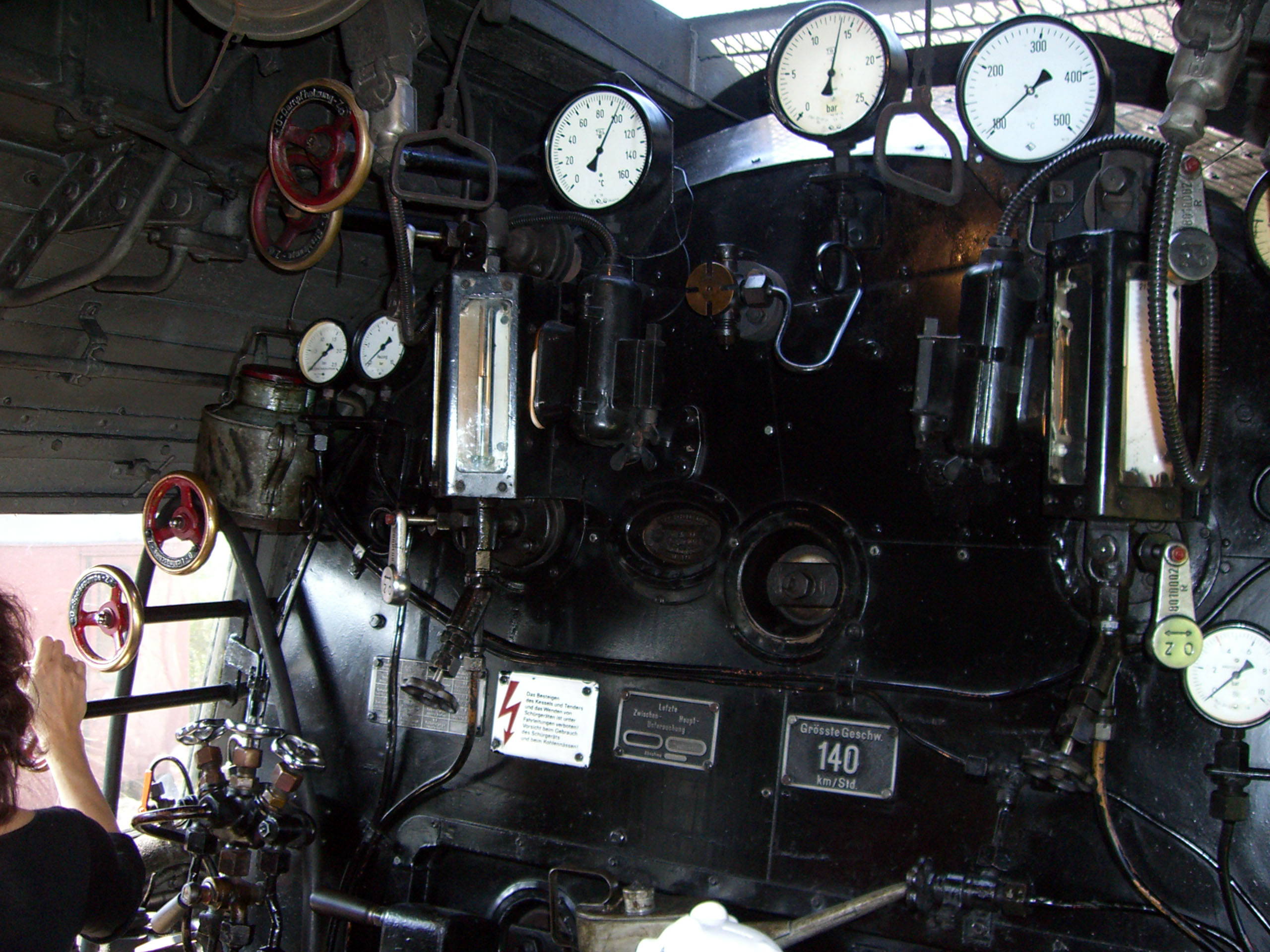
Driver's cab on 03 1010

== The DB Rebuilds ==
DB Class 03.10 Neubau-Ersatzkessel
Specifications
- Axle load: 18.9 t (18.6 long tons; 20.8 short tons)
- Adhesive weight: 56.8 t (55.9 long tons; 62.6 short tons)
- Empty weight: 93.2 t (91.7 long tons; 102.7 short tons)
- Service weight: 104.2 t (102.6 long tons; 114.9 short tons)
- Firebox
  - Grate area: 3.87 m^{2} (41.7 sq ft)
- Boiler
  - Tube plates: 5,200 mm (17 ft 3/4 in)
  - Small tubes: 54 mm (2 1/8 in), 80 off
  - Large tubes: 143 mm (5 5/8 in), 43 off
- Heating surface
  - Firebox: 21.22 m^{2} (228.4 sq ft)
  - Tubes: 64.04 m^{2} (689.3 sq ft)
  - Flues: 92.28 m^{2} (993.3 sq ft)
  - Total surface: 177.54 m^{2} (1,911.0 sq ft)
- Superheater
  - Heating area: 72.22 m^{2} (777.4 sq ft)
Performance figures
- Indicated power: 1,870 PS (1,380 kW; 1,840 hp)

In 1949 and 1950, the 26 Class 03.10 locomotives remaining with the Deutsche Bundesbahn were refurbished by Henschel in Kassel. The streamlined shells on all the locomotives were removed, mainly due to their poor condition. Externally, these engines can still be distinguished from the Class 03 by their still-recognisable steam dome, their cut-down smokebox door, the flat Erhebung of the superheater regulator, the air reservoirs, the missing front skirt, and the shape of the driver's cab and tender. The locomotives were stationed in Dortmund, Ludwigshafen and Offenburg after their refurbishment. The three engines stabled at the locomotive depot or Bw Dortmund, numbers 03 1014, 03 1022 and 03 1043, were given a special steel blue livery in June 1950 for their boilers, cabs, and cylinder blocks. The smokebox and chimney remained painted black.

In 1952, the feedwater preheater was moved back to the area of the chimney on most of the locomotives and a circular smokebox door fitted.

At the general inspection in 1954, 03 1014, 03 1022 and 03 1043 lost their steel blue livery again.

Because major signs of aging appeared on the boilers, the firm of Krupp was given the task of replacing them with welded boilers which had a combustion chamber. In addition the locomotives were given newly designed tenders with covers and supply equipment. Both were installed in the repair shop (Ausbesserungswerk or AW) in Brunswick between 1957 and 1961. In autumn 1958, all 26 engines were rehomed to Bw Hagen-Eckesey, after some had previously been based in Hamburg-Altona and Paderborn. These were numbers 03 1001, 1004, 1008, 1009, 1011–1014, 1016, 1017, 1021, 1022, 1043, 1045, 1049–1051, 1054–1056, 1060, 1073, 1076, 1081, 1082 and 1084. Between November 1965 and September 1966, all Class 03.10 locomotives were withdrawn, retired and scrapped.

== Surviving locomotives ==
The former no. 03 1010 is a museum locomotive retained as part of the DB fleet. It is homed in the former railway depot of Halle P (DB Museum, Halle (Saale)), maintained by the Railway Social Work Foundation (BSW) Group, Traditionsgemeinschaft Bw Halle P BSW, and supported financially by the Society for the Preservation of Schnellzugdampflok 03 1010 Following its main inspection in 2011 by the Meiningen Steam Locomotive Works, they use it to haul railway specials throughout Germany.

The non-operational, oil-fired no. 03 1090 has also been preserved as a museum locomotive. It, too, is owned by DB. It is on loan to the Mecklenburg Railway and Technology Museum, located in the former shed at Schwerin Central Station.

The streamlined 03 1015 is today owned by the PKP and is on display as a non-operational exhibit in the Warsaw Railway Museum.

== See also ==
- List of DRG locomotives and railbuses
- List of preserved steam locomotives in Germany
