= DR Class VT 2.09 =

DR Class VT 2.09 DR Class 171/172 DBAG Class 771/772
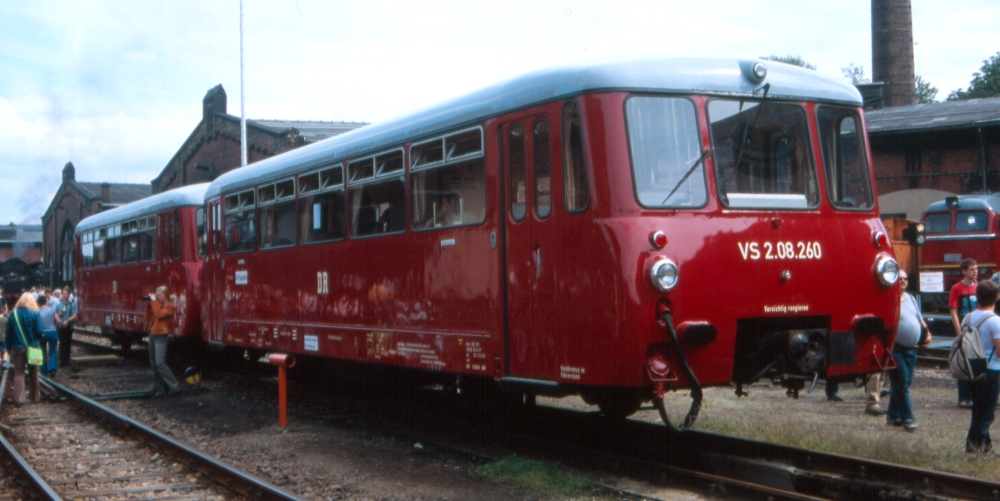
- Railcar VT 2.09 and driving trailer VS 2.09 in restored original paint scheme
- Manufacturer: Waggonbau Bautzen
- Constructed: 1957 (pilot series), 1962 – 1969
- Operators: Deutsche Reichsbahn; Deutsche Bahn

Specifications
- Car length: 13.55 m (44 ft 5 1/2 in)
- Wheel diameter: 900 mm (35.43 in)
- Wheelbase: 6,000 mm (19 ft 8 1/4 in)
- Maximum speed: 90 km/h (56 mph)
- Weight: 15.6 t (15.4 long tons; 17.2 short tons) ... 19.3 t (19.0 long tons; 21.3 short tons)
- Prime movers: 6KVD 18 SIHRW, 6KVD 18/15
- Engine type: Diesel
- Power output: 132 kW (179 PS; 177 hp) (series)
- Transmission: hydraulic-mechanical
- UIC classification: 1A (powered car), 2 (trailer)
- Braking systems: pneumatic disk-brakes (all), magnetic track brake (powered cars only)
- Coupling system: Scharfenberg
- Track gauge: 1,435 mm (4 ft 8 1/2 in) standard gauge

DR class VT 2.09 were light railcars of Deutsche Reichsbahn in the GDR. They were designed and built by Waggonbau Bautzen. In 1970 they were renumbered into classes 171/172, and in 1992 into classes 771/772.

== History ==
In order to replace pre-war railcars and steam-hauled passenger trains on branch lines, Waggonbau Bautzen started designing a new series of light railcars started in 1955 and completed the first two prototypes in 1959. One of them had a Büssing engine, the other one from Dieselmotorenwerk Berlin-Johannisthal. They entered regular service in 1962. In the same year, six more railcars with trailers were built, and in 1963 sixteen more railcars and for the first time some driving trailers, too. Further vehicles were built by Waggonbau Görlitz.

The original classification as VT 2.09 refers to the general type of vehicle (VT = Verbrennungstriebwagen = railcar with internal combustion engine), the power output (approximately 1/100 of the engine power, measured in PS) and the top speed (approximately 1/10 of the value in km/h). The trailers were numbered as VB 2.08, the driving trailers as VS 2.07.

The series had multiple nicknames, among them Ferkeltaxe ("piglet taxi") due to it being commonly used on rural lines, or Blutblase ("blood blister") because of their original dark red paint. After repainting, the name Pfefferminzbonbon ("peppermint candy") could be heard.

After Deutsche Reichsbahn and Deutsche Bundesbahn pooled their rolling stock in 1992, accompanied by a renumbering of the DR fleet, many members of this class were rebuilt and repainted into the mint green - white scheme of the regional trains. After new railcars became available, classes 771/772 were withdrawn from service in 2000. 22 vehicles were sold to Cuba and Romania, others to Spain and Brazil. The last railcar of class 772 was retired from regular service in Stendal in January 2004.

== Technical details ==
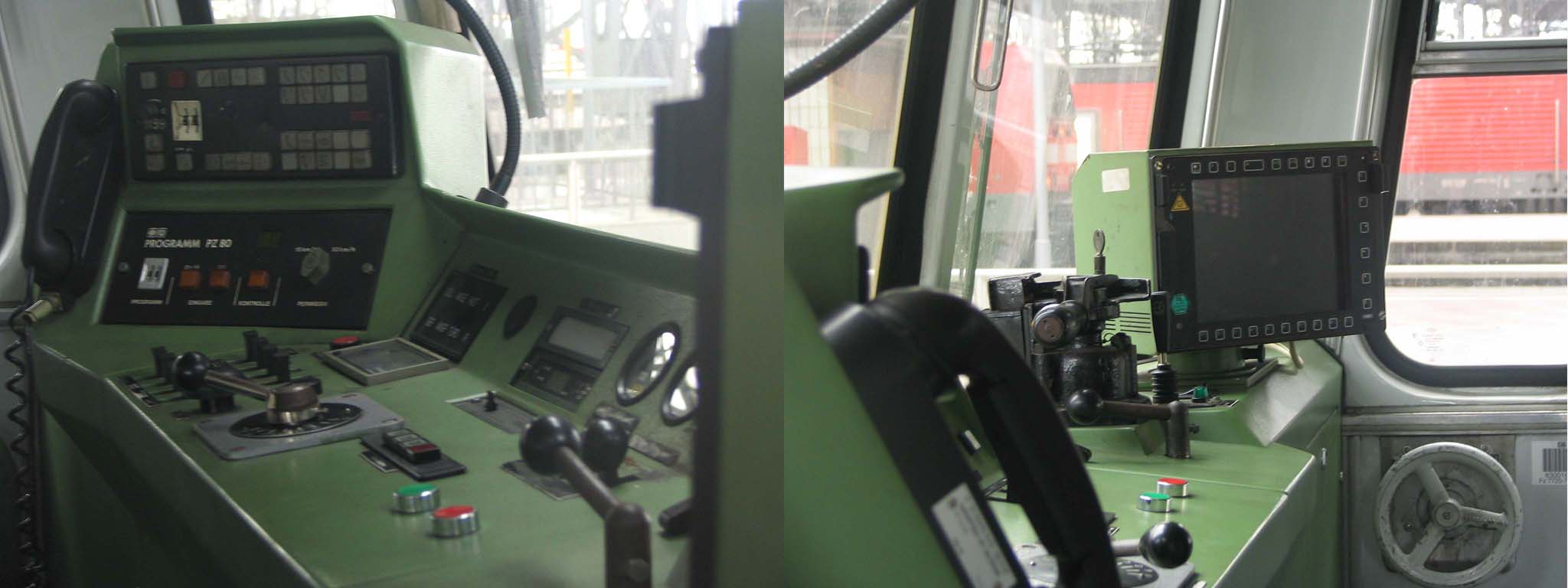
Cab of 772 342

Powered cars had two cabs that were originally open to the interior, driving trailers had only one. The folding doors could be closed remotely and had warning bells and lights. The six-cylinder engines of type 6 KVD 18 SIHRW, built by Elbewerk Roßlau and nearly identical to those used in the shunting locomotives of DR Class V 15, were mounted beneath the floor. The last, Görlitz-built series was equipped with the new version 6KVD 18/15-1 HRW of this engine, specially modified for use in the railcars. The power was transmitted over a hydraulic drive, followed by an electro-mechanical gearbox to one axle. A pneumatically operated axle-mounted reverse gearbox allowed directional control. The electrical systems of the powered car were supplied by a 24 V / 1.2 kW alternator, those of the trailers by generators which were driven from the axle by a belt. The latter proved insufficient so that the powered cars were later equipped with two alternators working in parallel. Thermostat-controlled heating was provided by oil-fired radiators, in the powered cars also by the engine cooling water.

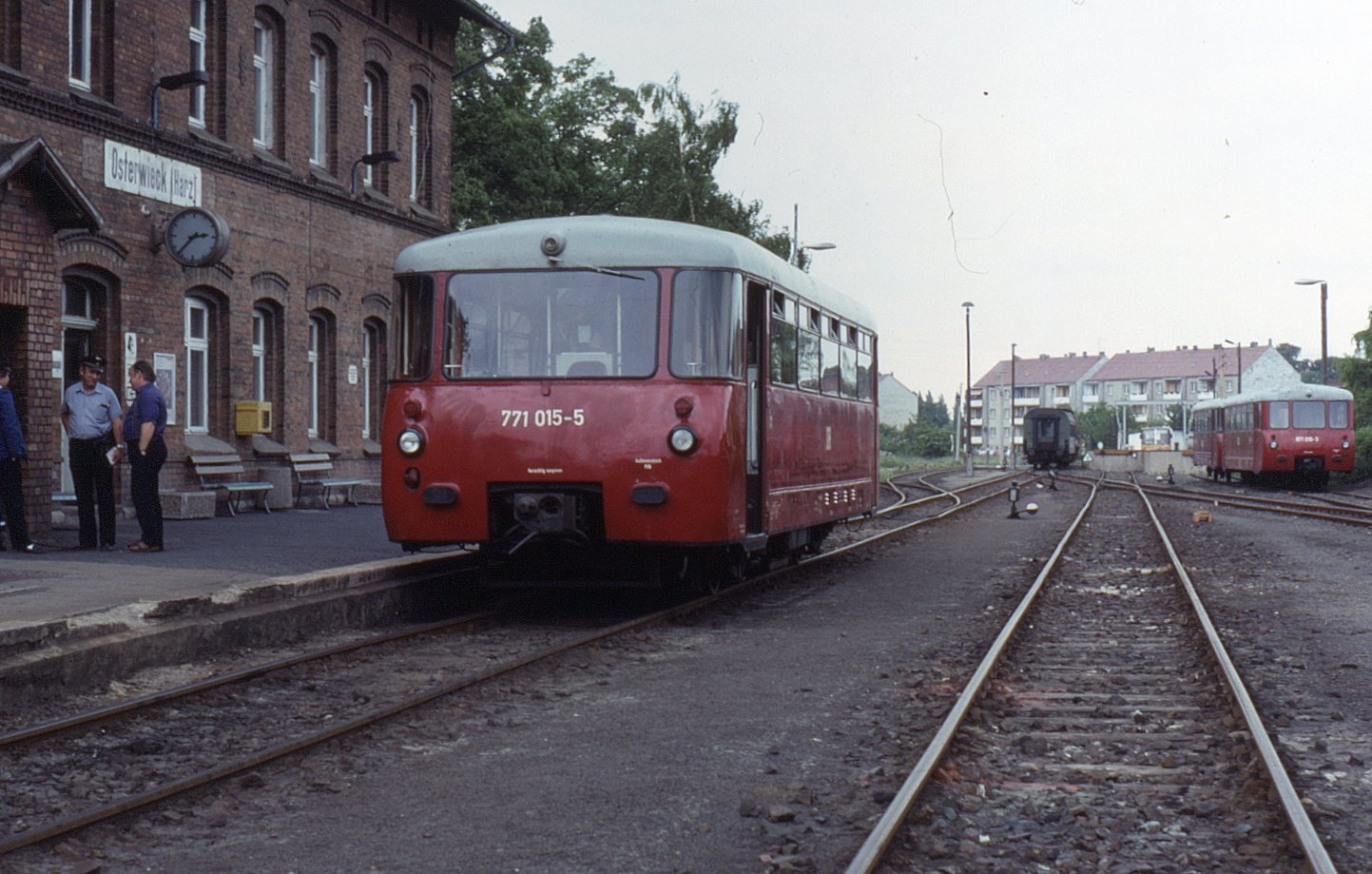
771 015 (left) from the first series with curved windows, and unidentified vehicles from the later series (right) with straight windows in the corners of the cabs

The first members of the class had curved windows reaching around the corners of the cabs. For easier manufacturing, later vehicles were equipped with flat glass windows overall, and have pillars in the cab corners.

Starting 1965, the later series (which became class 172) were equipped with multiple-unit train control, so that trains consisting of up to 6 cars could be run. To avoid damage by the buffers of other rolling stock, auxiliary rubber buffers were fitted at the appropriate height.

Re-building in the early 1990s involved the installation of train radios, PZB cab signalling, new driver's consoles, an electronic timetable system (EBuLa), and rear walls with lockable doors for the cabs. The interior was refurbished according to the then prevailing taste, the number of available seats dropped from 54 to 40. New engines of MAN type 2866 UH with 162 kW power were installed, some of the electro-mechanical gearboxes were replaced with Voith Diwa D863 hydraulic gearboxes of a type used in buses. Some driving trailers were motorised, and two powered cars that were used on the lines on Usedom island were converted to use natural gas as engine fuel.

== Operation ==
The railcars were intended for branch line services and could be seen almost all over the GDR, except on lines with steep gradients. Due to their top speed of 90 km/h they were also used in stopping train services on mainlines, in particular north of Berlin. Furthermore, they saw regular use on suburban services around Berlin and Leipzig, and on staff trains.

== Preservation ==
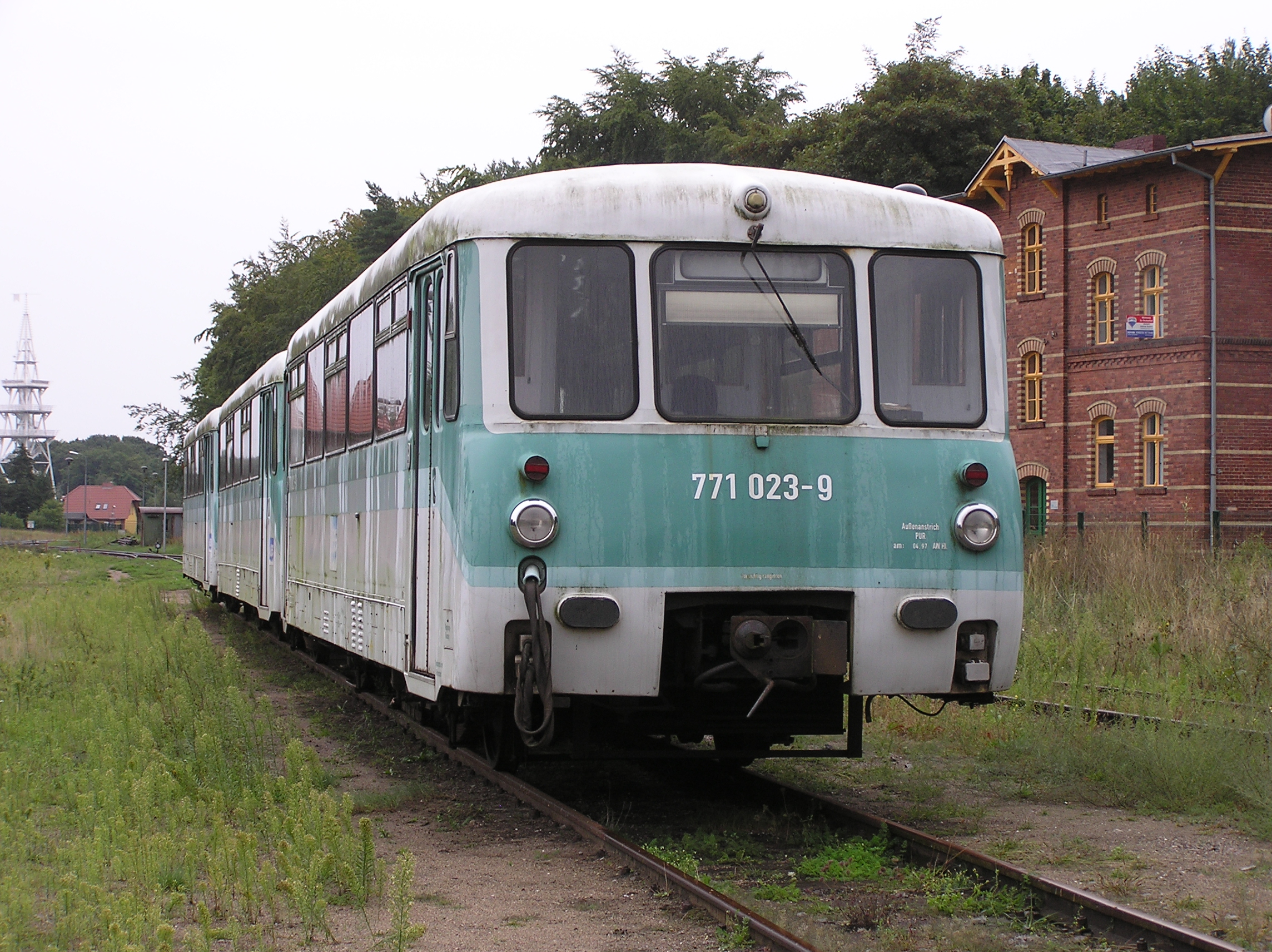
Withdrawn units stabled in Heringsdorf

Several railcars and trailers have been preserved for excursion trains, among them

- 772 001+972 601: Hafenbahn Neustrelitz
- 772 342, 772 332: Lausitzer Dampflokclub
- 772 140, 772 141: Oberweißbacher Berg- und Schwarzatalbahn
- 772 171, 772 132, 972 760: Traditionsgemeinschaft Ferkeltaxi (mainly used in central Germany)
- 771 056, 772 155, 772 312, 772 367, 972 741: Eisenbahnnostalgie Vogtland (stationed in Adorf and used regularly on the Annaberg-Buchholz–Schwarzenberg railway and the Schönberg–Schleiz railway)
- 772 413+972 502: Ostsächsische Eisenbahnfreunde Löbau
- 772 173: Usedomer Eisenbahn GbR
- 772 345: Erfurter Bahnservice

== Further information ==
- Bernd Friedrichs, Andreas Stange (2010). Die Leicht-Verbrennungs-Triebwagen der Deutschen Reichsbahn (in German). Freiburg: EK-Verlag. ISBN 978-3-88255-231-7.
- Thomas Nitsch. "Die Ferkeltaxe 171/172" (in German).
- Stefan Lorenz (2011-03-28). "Die Ferkeltaxe der Deutschen Reichsbahn". Archived from the original on 2016-04-06.
- Wolfgang Herdam, Gerhard Bank (2001). Fotomotiv Ferkeltaxi. Fotoverlag Wolfgang Herdam. ISBN 978-3933178107. (Photographs)
