= DR Class V 15 =

DR Class V 15/V 22 DR Class 101/102.0 DBAG Class 311/312
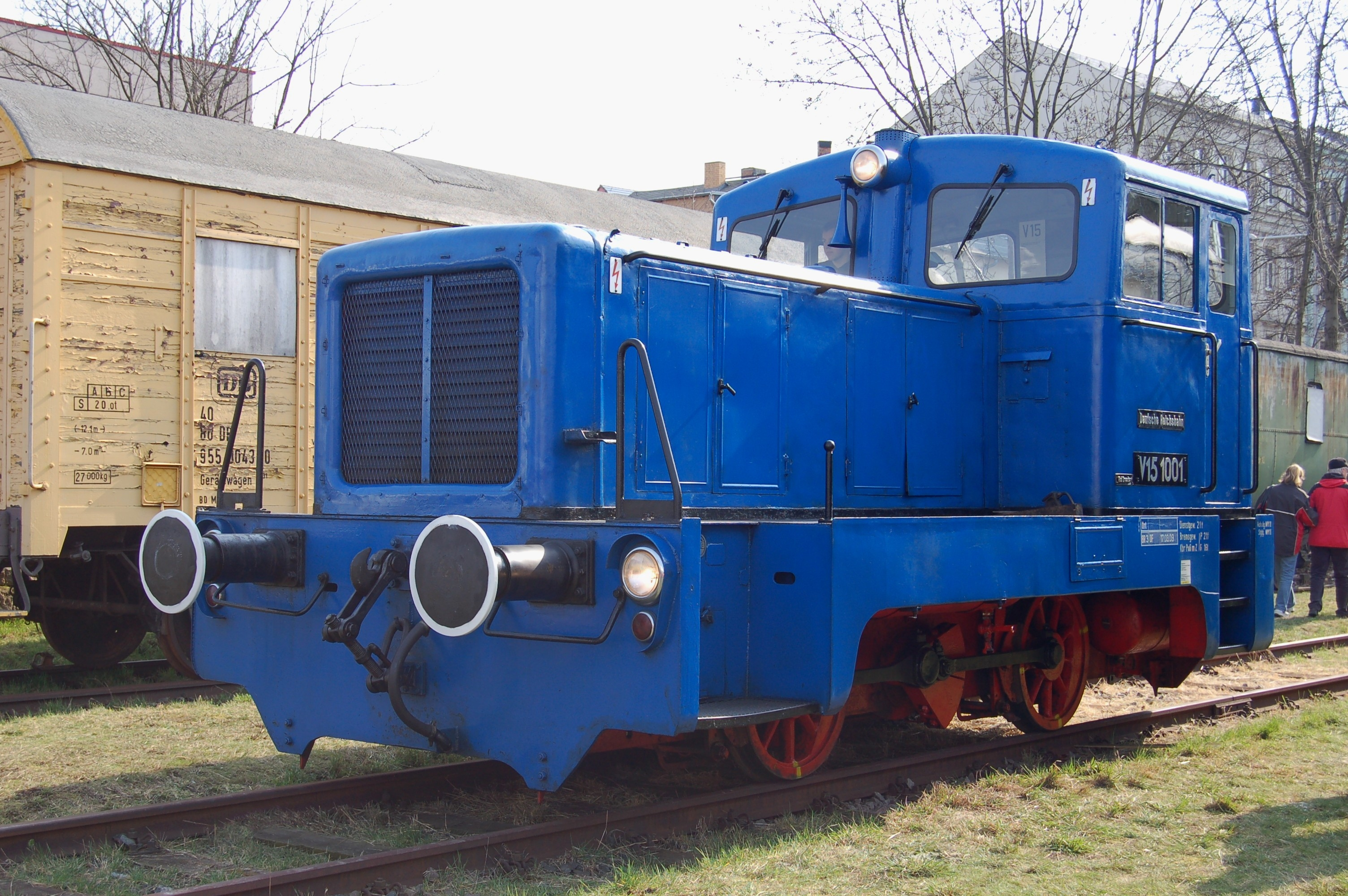
- Preserved first locomotive of DR class V 15
Type and origin
- Power type: Diesel-hydraulic
- Builder: LKM Babelsberg
- Build date: Pilot series: 1959/60; V 15, V 18 B: 1960–1966; V 23, B 22 B: 1967–1976
- Total produced: 350
Specifications
- Configuration
  - Whyte: 0-4-0DH
  - UIC: B dh
- Gauge: 1,435 mm (4 ft 8 1/2 in)
- Wheel diameter: 900 mm (2 ft 11 3/8 in); 1,000 mm (3 ft 3 3/8 in) from V 15 2026
- Wheelbase: 2,500 mm (8 ft 2 3/8 in)
- Length
  - Over buffers: 6,490 mm (21 ft 3 1/2 in)
- Axle load: 10–12 t (9.8–11.8 long tons; 11–13 short tons)
- Service weight: 20–24 t (20–24 long tons; 22–26 short tons)
- Fuel type: Diesel fuel
- Fuel capacity: 350 or 400 L (77 or 88 imp gal; 92 or 106 US gal)
- Prime mover: MWJ 6 KVD 18 SRW or ER 6 VD 18/15-1 SRW
- Engine type: six-cylinder four-stroke diesel
- Transmission: hydraulic
- Loco brake: pneumatic
- Couplers: Buffers and chain coupler
Performance figures
- Maximum speed: V 15: 32 km/h (20 mph); from V 15 2026: 37 km/h (23 mph); V 23: 55 km/h (34 mph)
- Power output: V 15: 150–180 PS (110–130 kW); V 23: 220 PS (160 kW)
Career
- Operators: Deutsche Reichsbahn; Deutsche Bahn
- Numbers: DR: V 15 1001–1020, 2001–2102, 2200–2349; V 23 001–080; DR 101 004...016, 101 101...349, 102 001–080; 101 501...702 (rebuilt); DB: 311 004...016, 311 101...349, 312 001...080, 311 501...702
- Retired: from 1992

DR class V 15 and DR class V 23 were diesel locomotives of Deutsche Reichsbahn in the GDR with side-rod drive for light shunting duties.

== History ==
In order to cover losses incurred during World War II, Deutsche Reichsbahn had some additional Kleinlokomotiven built in the early 1950s. However, a more powerful light shunting locomotive with an engine power of 150 ... 180 PS (110 ... 132 kW) was required to replace the aging Kleinlokomotiven and the steam locomotives used for similar duties. In 1956, LKM Babelsberg presented the new type V 10 B with mechanical gear and a 100 PS (74 kW) engine with wheels of 900 mm (35 in) diameter, based upon the concept of the Kö, but with a higher and closed cab for use on industrial railways and sidings. As this class did not quite satisfy the demands of DR, class V 15 was developed from it. This new class was equipped with hydraulic gears of type GSR 12/3,7 (single torque converter) and originally with 150 PS (110 kW) engines of type 6 KVD 18 SRW. The design model V 15 101 still resembled a Kö II and was not taken into service by DR. Instead, it was sold to Institut für Schienenfahrzeuge Berlin-Adlershof.

In 1959/1960 a pilot series of five locomotives and a first production run of 15 locomotives were built with 150 PS (110 kW) engines and numbered as sub-class V 15.10. Beginning in 1960, further locomotives were built with 180 PS (130 kW) engines as sub-class V15.20-21. This more powerful version of V 15 with 180 PS (130 kW) was also supplied as V 18 B to industrial railways. From V 15 1026 on, the wheel diameter was increased to 1,000 mm (39 in). Several batches of this type were built until 1966.

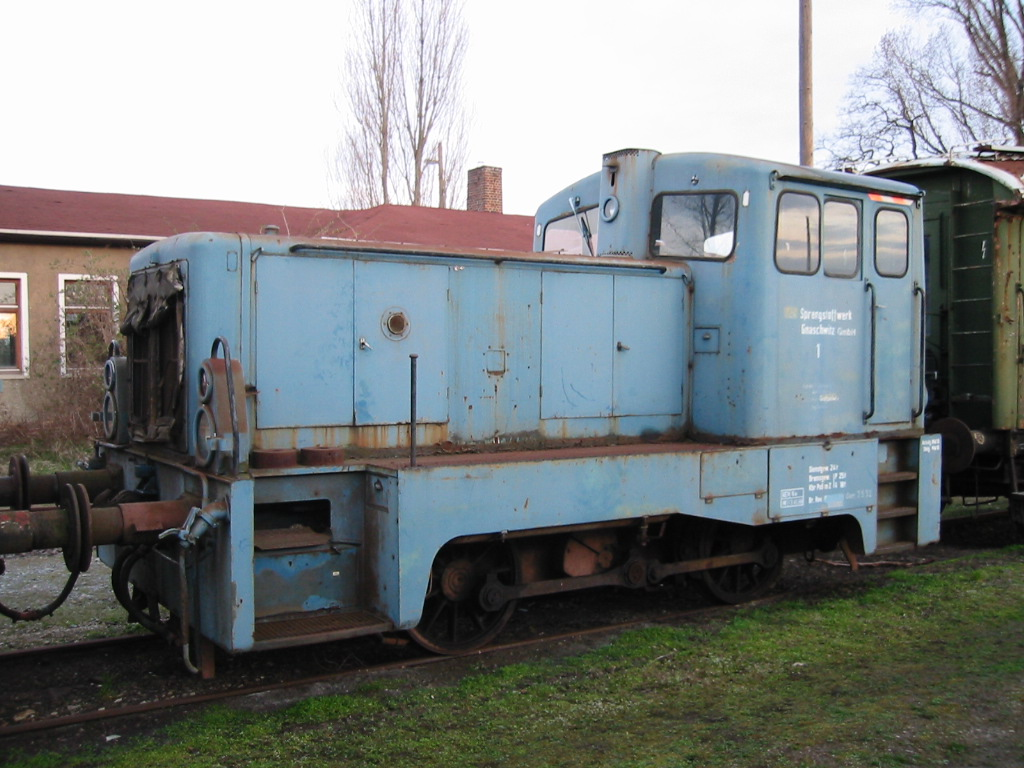
V 22 B with multiple unit controls

A second, more powerful series was developed in 1966 with newly developed 220 PS (160 kW) engines of type 6 VD 18/15-1 SRW 1 (Manufacturer: Motorenwerk Roßlau; 6 cylinders, 19 L (4.2 imp gal; 5.0 US gal), 1510 min^{−1}, 150 mm bore, 180 mm stroke) and a more robust power transmission of type GSU 20/4,5 with two torque converters. Starting in 1967, these locomotives were sold as V 22 B to industrial railways, and from 1968 to 1970 DR took 80 locomotives into service DR as V 23. When the newly developed DR class 102.1 was introduced in 1970, DR stopped purchasing locomotives of this class. Industrial railways continued to procure V 22 B locomotives until 1976. From 1974 on, some were equipped with multiple-unit train controls and automatic engine control so that one driver could operate two coupled locomotives.

V 15 locomotives with worn-out engines were gradually, and from 1975 on systematically, refitted with 220 PS (160 kW) engines and the improved GSU 20/4,2 gears, also with two torque converters, and were re-numbered into class V 23.0 or 101.5-7 in the order of their conversion.

Some engines have been equipped with vigilance devices and shunting radios.

== Technical details ==
The frames of the locomotives are welded from 20 mm (0.79 in) thick steel plates with a cover plate that was cut out for engine and gearbox. The ends of the frame are strengthened to carry standard buffers and chain link couplers. The frame rests on adjustable leaf springs, the axles have slide bearings. Engine, radiator, fuel tank, sandboxes and silencer are mounted under the hood, air tanks beneath the running boards. The batteries are mounted behind the front steps. Starting with class 102.0 the locomotives were also fitted with an oil-fired engine pre-heater under the cab.

The engine (with electric starter) is connected to the hydraulic transmission by a torsionally flexible clutch and a short articulated drive shaft. The reversing gear is directly connected to the hydraulic transmission and drives the jack shaft. The torque is transmitted by side rods to the wheels. A belt drive from the engine drives the radiator fan, the air compressor and the alternator.

The pneumatic brake of type Knorr acts on both wheelsets, the hand brake also uses the linkage of the pneumatic brake.

== Use and withdrawal ==
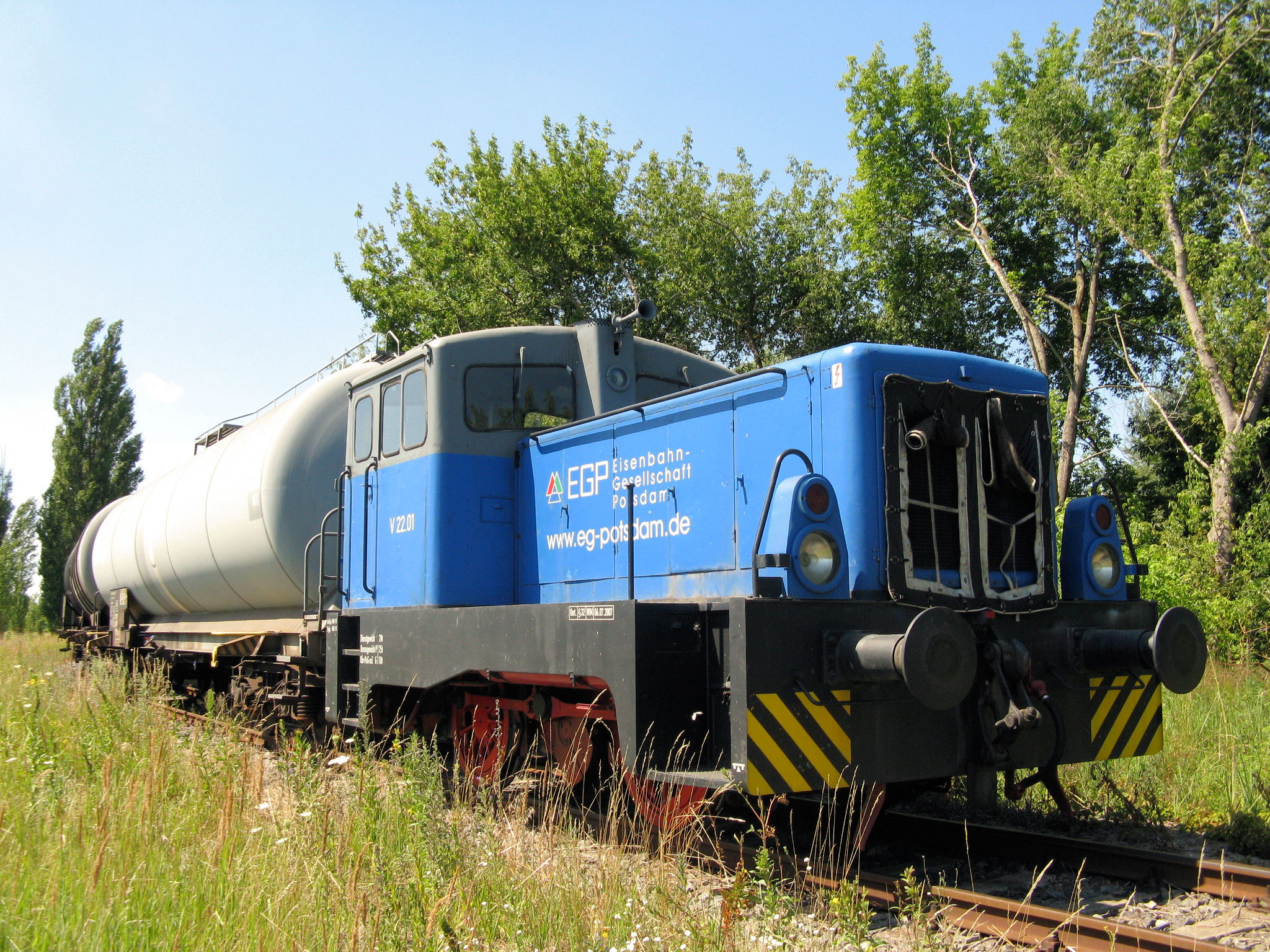
V 22 B of Eisenbahn-Gesellschaft Potsdam in revenue service in Wittenberge (2009)

The locomotives of these classes were used all over the GDR, mainly for their intended purpose of light shunting duties in smaller stations and on industrial tracks, but also for work trains and in some cases for light freight and passenger trains, in particular on the short-distance Blankenfelde–Mahlow shuttle (later replaced by a railbus) and on the tourist trains between Dessau and Wörlitz. Maintenance was performed locally or in RAW Halle (Saale), industrial locomotives were mainly maintained in Tharandt. Starting in 1992 and continued by DB AG, classes 311 and 312 were withdrawn from service, scrapped or sold. Some engines have been retained for works duties, others were preserved on industrial railways, in railway museums and by museum railways.

== In Hungary ==
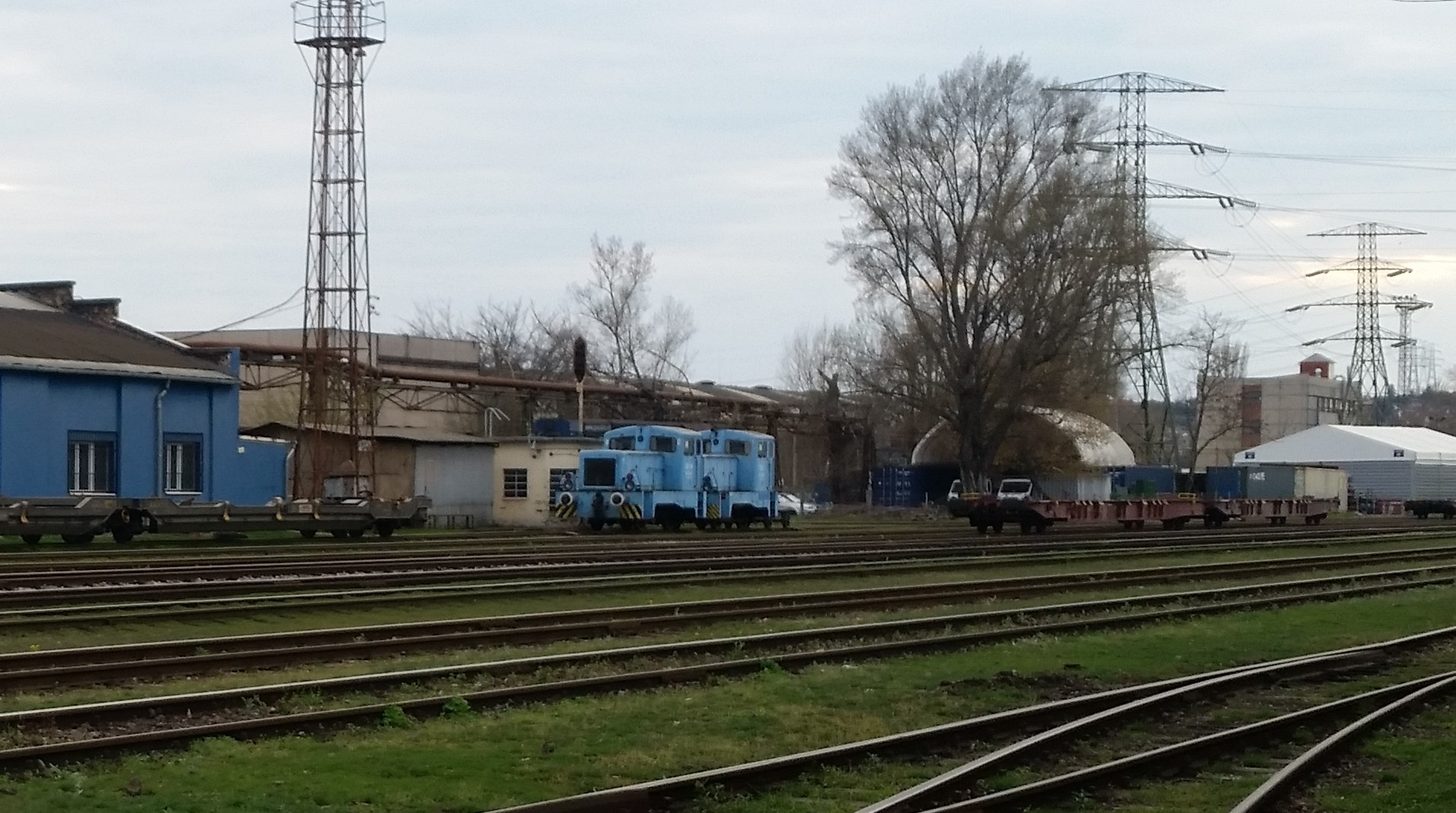
A26 in Csepel

The type was also widely used in Hungary. Unlike other Hungarian locomotives, it was used exclusively for internal use in factories and industrial plants, so it did not receive a MÁV numbering, but was classified as A26. ("A" numbers were given to MÁV diesel locomotives for internal use in industrial plants, e.g. MÁV M43 = A29). The 26 did not have a MÁV number, which was unique among Hungarian locomotives. The type was used until the 2010s, e.g. in the area of Csepel Works (before: Manfréd Weiss Steel and Metal Works). In some places there are still 1-2 of them today.

== Further information ==
- Wolfgang Glatte (1986). Diesellok-Archiv. Berlin: Transpress. ISBN 3-344-00061-6.
