= Narrow-gauge small locomotives of the Deutsche Reichsbahn =

Steam traction was the predominant form of motive power used by the Deutsche Reichsbahn on its narrow-gauge railways. For certain duties diesel locomotives were also used, albeit these were usually second-hand or rebuilt engines.

Locomotives with a gauge of 750 mm (2 ft 5 1/2 in) were classified as Kö 6001ff. and 1,000 mm (3 ft 3 3/8 in) locomotives as Kö 6501ff.. From 1970 they were incorporated into Class 100 without regard to their gauge. This applied to all Kleinlokomotiven and they were given serial numbers from 901ff.. Due to the risk of confusion, in 1973 the narrow-gauge diesel locomotives were reclassified to 199. In addition, from 1992 they became DBAG Class 399; and once more the gauge was deducible from the serial number as follows: 1,000 mm = 399.1, 600 mm (1 ft 11 5/8 in) = 399.6, 750 mm = 399.7.

== 1949–1970 ==
=== Heeresfeldbahnlokomotive HF 130 C ===
Two former three-axled Heeresfeldbahnloks of Type HF 130 C were refurbished by the DR for various 750 mm (2 ft 5 1/2 in) narrow-gauge lines. They were given the numbers Köf 6001 and 6003, the first was deployed to Dahme, the second to Nauen. Following the dismantling of the Nauen line in 1963 it, too, went to Dahme. When that line closed in 1965 both locomotives were transferred to Rügen. Köf 6001 (from 1970: 100 901 and from 1973: 199 001) was retired in 1985, the other one (from 1970: 100 902 and from 1973: 199 002), last used by the DR as no. 399 703 and is still in service today under its old number of Kö 6003.

=== BMAG FD 80 ===
BMAG FD 80 Kö 6002
Type and origin
- Power type: 4 cylinder, 4 stroke
- Builder: BMAG
- Build date: 1937
- Total produced: 1
Specifications
- Configuration
  - UIC: C
- Gauge: 750 mm (2 ft 5 1/2 in)
- Driver dia.: 700 mm (27.56 in)
- Wheelbase
  - Bogie: 1,500 mm (59.06 in)
- Length
  - Over beams: 5,200 mm (204.72 in)
- Width: 1,900 mm (74.80 in)
- Height: 2,900 mm (114.17 in)
- Transmission: mechanical
- Running steps: 4
Performance figures
- Maximum speed: 20 km/h (12 mph)
- Installed power: 62.5 kW (83.8 hp)
- Tractive effort
  - Starting: 41 Mp (400 kN; 40 LT_{f}; 45 ST_{f})
Career
- Numbers: Kö 6002
- Retired: 1962

This engine of Type FD 80 with a gauge of 750 mm (2 ft 5 1/2 in) was delivered to the Kleinbahnen in the district of Jerichow I in 1936 . She had three axles, all coupled, and a centrally positioned driver's cab. On one side was the engine, on the other the mechanical four-geared drive which drove the axles. It was mainly used as a shunter in Burg station. In the Reichsbahn she was given the number Kö 6002. She was retired in 1962.

=== Kö 6004 ===
Kö 6004
Type and origin
- Builder: KHD, RAW Dessau (Umbau)
- Model: 4 KVD 14,5
- Build date: 1944, rebuilt in 1959
- Total produced: 1
Specifications
- Configuration
  - UIC: B
- Gauge: 750 mm (2 ft 5 1/2 in)
- Driver dia.: 560 mm (22.05 in)
- Length
  - Over beams: 5,210 mm (205.12 in)
- Width: 1,180 mm (46.46 in)
- Height: 2,440 mm (96.06 in)
- Empty weight: 12 t (11.8 long tons; 13.2 short tons)
- RPM
  - Nominal RPM: 1500 rpm
- Transmission: mechanical
Performance figures
- Maximum speed: 20 km/h (12 mph)
- Installed power: 44 kW (59 hp)
Career
- Numbers: Kö 6004
- Retired: 1967 sold

A twin-axled former pit locomotive from the Heeresfeldbahn fleet, built in 1944 at Klöckner-Humboldt-Deutz, which was stored after the war at Dahme. It was renovated in 1959 for use at RAW Dessau, the main change being a larger driver's cab. The axles were driven via a gear train and roller chains. In 1967 she was sold to Pretzien to the Ballerstedt Transport KG, where she hauled gravel trains until 1980.

=== LKM Type Ns 3 ===
LKM Ns 3 DR Kö 6000, Kö 6500
Type and origin
- Builder: LKM
- Model: 4 KVD 14.5 (6005) 6 KVD 14.5
- Build date: 1953/1954
- Total produced: 1 and 2
Specifications
- Configuration
  - UIC: B
- Gauge: 750 mm (2 ft 5 1/2 in); 1,000 mm (3 ft 3 3/8 in)
- Driver dia.: 700 mm (27.56 in)
- Minimum curve: 15 m (49.2 ft)
- Wheelbase
  - Overall: 1,250 mm (49.21 in)
- Length
  - Over beams: 4,630 mm (182.28 in)
- Width: 1,850 mm (72.83 in), 2,800 mm (110.24 in) (Kö 6502)
- Height: 2,660 mm (104.72 in)
- Adhesive weight: 11 t (10.8 long tons; 12.1 short tons) / 11.5 t (11.3 long tons; 12.7 short tons)
- Empty weight: 11 t (10.8 long tons; 12.1 short tons) / 11.5 t (11.3 long tons; 12.7 short tons)
- RPM
  - Nominal RPM: 1500 rpm
- Transmission: mechanical
- Running steps: 3
Performance figures
- Maximum speed: 15 km/h (9.3 mph)
- Installed power: 44 kW (59 hp)
- Tractive effort
  - Starting: 2.9 Mp (28 kN; 2.9 LT_{f}; 3.2 ST_{f})
Career
- Numbers: Kö 6005, Kö 6501, 6502; 100 903/904; 199 003/004
- Retired: see text

During the 1950s, VEB Lokomotivbau Karl Marx in Babelsberg built diesel locomotives for industrial and field railways, which were also suited to various (narrow) gauge uses (s = Schmalspur or narrow gauge). The first engines of Type Ns 3 were delivered in 1952. A total of 280 locomotives of this class were built. The locomotive drive was achieved by means of a mechanical, three-stage gear train with friction clutch via a jackshaft lying between the axles and connecting rods to the axles. The locos were with equipped with water-cooled, four-cylinder, four-stroke diesel engines generating a nominal 60 horsepower.

They had an outside frame, the drive was achieved using a mechanical, three-stage gear and a reverse gear unit. The axles were driven by connecting rods via a jackshaft. The Treibzapfen and crank pins were located outside the frame.

One locomotive of Type Ns 3 with a gauge of 750 mm (2 ft 5 1/2 in) ended up at Rügen, where it was initially used in the Stubben Chalk Factory and, from 1954, on the Rügen Railways as Kö 6005 for shunting duties. On the withdrawal of goods services she was stored in 1970.

Two metre-gauge examples of this class were originally built for the Soviet Army and ended up in the Industriebahn Halle in 1965 where they were used to shunt the sidings. They had numbers Kö 6501 and 6502. The first was initially used from 1963 to 1965 in Barth on the Franzburg lines. The technically identical locomotives only differed in appearance: The second was given a 2800 mm wide driver's cab, so that the vision when shunting with standard-gauge wagons was better. Instead of a buffer this locomotive had a long coupling rod (Kuppelbaum) for rollbock work.

They were renumbered in 1970 to 100 903 and 904, and in 1973 to 199 003 and 004. In 1983/1984 they were retired. Shortly beforehand they had been given the numbers 199 991 and 992 to distinguish them from their successors.

== From 1970 ==
The remaining Kleinloks, Kö 6001, 6003, 6501 and 6502, were incorporated as Class 199.0. They were joined by other locomotives:

=== LKM Type Ns 4 ===
LKM Ns 4 DR 199.0
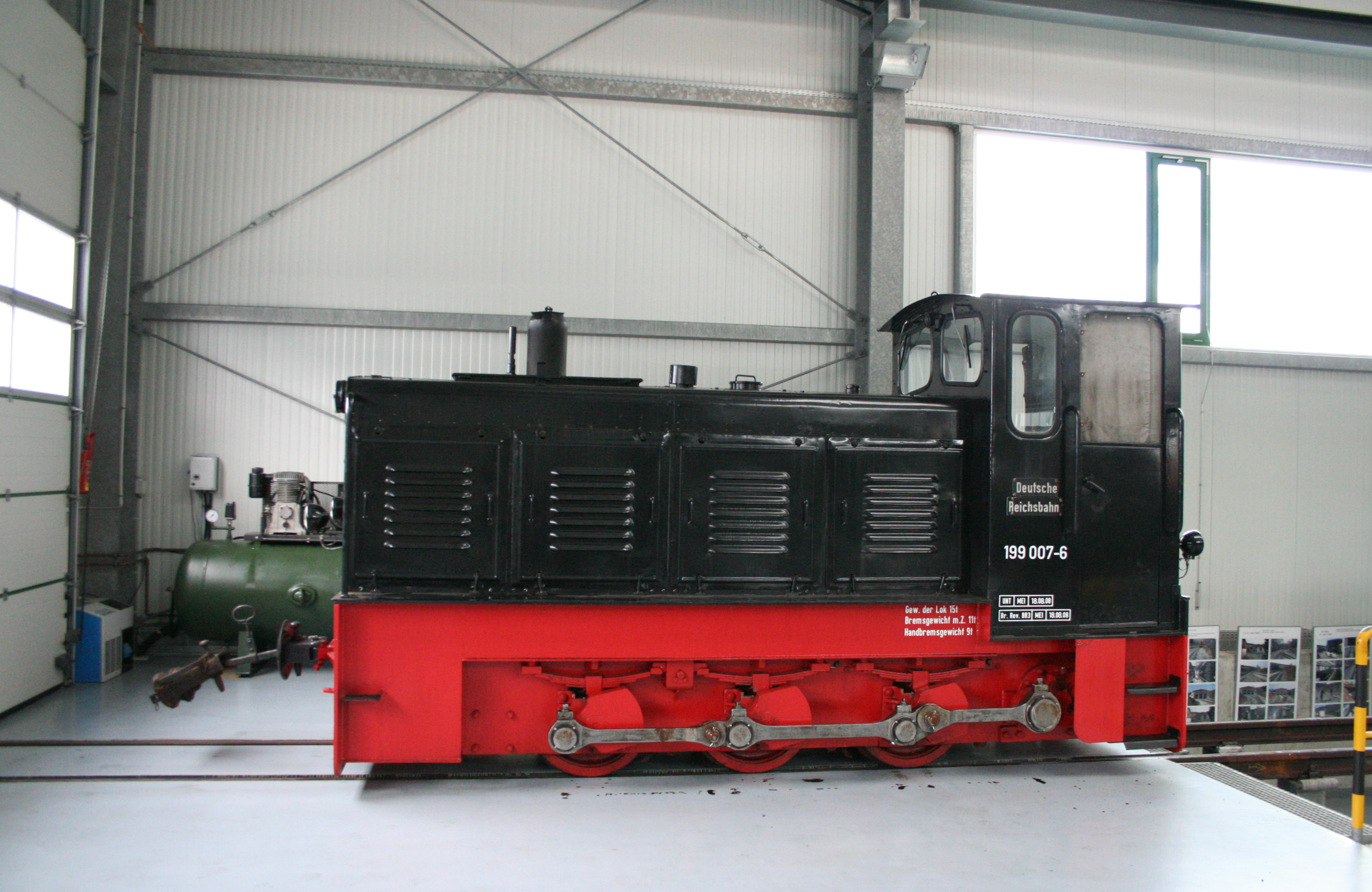
- Diesellok 199 007 Type Ns 4 in Jöhstadt 02.01.09
Type and origin
- Builder: LKM
- Model: 6 KVD 14.5 SRW
- Build date: 1957
- Total produced: 3
Specifications
- Configuration
  - UIC: C
- Gauge: 750 mm (2 ft 5 1/2 in)
- Driver dia.: 700 mm (27.56 in)
- Length
  - Over beams: 5,340 mm (210.24 in)
- Width: 1,720 mm (67.72 in)
- Height: 2,660 mm (104.72 in)
- Service weight: 14.6 t (14.4 long tons; 16.1 short tons)
- RPM
  - Nominal RPM: 1500 rpm
- Transmission: mechanical
- Running steps: 4
Performance figures
- Maximum speed: 24 km/h (15 mph)
- Installed power: 66 kW (89 hp)
- Tractive effort
  - Starting: 43 Mp (420 kN; 42 LT_{f}; 47 ST_{f})
Career
- Numbers: 199 007, 199 008, 199 103
- Retired: 1990

The most powerful locomotive of the first LKM type had a power output of 90 horsepower (90 PS). In 1954 two prototypes of the Ns 4 were built for were for export to Hungary. In 1955 18 locomotives were built for Indonesia with the type designation of Ns 4 a. There is still at least one locomotive of Type Ns 4 a in Indonesia today. Production of the Ns 4 b did not begin until 1957. Twenty-two units were manufactured from 1957 to 1958. Four examples remain in Germany. The three aforementioned types all had outside frames suitable for gauges from 600 mm (1 ft 11 5/8 in) to 760 mm (2 ft 5 15/16 in). In 1957 and 1959, 18 examples of Type Ns 4 c were built, designed for rail gauges from 600 mm to 760 mm and which already had the exterior of the V 10 C. No surviving example is known. Of the outside frame series from the year 1958, at least two of the locomotives had the new superstructure, although certainly not all of them. Whether this intermediate series should be designated as Ns 4 b or Ns 4 c is not absolutely clear.

In the DR there were at least 3 locomotives of Type Ns 4 b, of which all have survived. Their histories are given below.

==== 199 007 ====
The DR bought locomotive no. 250029/1957 from VEB Feinspinnerei Venusberg in 1972 and deployed it until 1991 in Wilischtal on the industrial line of the paper factory, VEB Papierfabrik Wilischthal (Thumer Netz). It was given no. 199 007. In 1992 it was sold to the Preßnitz Valley Railway Society.

==== 199 008 ====
In 1957 the locomotive with factory number 250027 was delivered to the VEB Kieswerk Ottendorf-Okrilla gravel works with a gauge of 600 mm (1 ft 11 5/8 in) . In 1962 it was regauged to 750 mm (2 ft 5 1/2 in) and transferred to the sugar factory, VEB Zuckerfabrik Döbeln. In 1970 they sold it to the VEB Gießerei foundry and engineering works of "Ferdinand Kunert" (GISAG) at Schmiedeberg and operated it as loco no. 2 on the factory siding. In 1987 they sold it to the DR who and used it as "199 008", later as "399 702" for various tasks include the dismantling of the Preßnitz Valley Railway and on the industrial railway of the paper factory, VEB Papierfabrik Wilischtal. In 1993 it was sold to the Döllnitz Valley Railway.

==== 199 103 ====
In 1957 locomotive 250026 was delivered to the ballast works of VEB Schotterwerk Althüttendorf with a gauge of 750 mm (2 ft 5 1/2 in). Later it was sold to the brick factory of VEB Ziegelwerk Ueckermünde and regauged to 600 mm (1 ft 11 5/8 in) . In 1983 the DR bought it for the "Berline Pioneer Railway" (Pioniereisenbahn Berlin, today the Berlin Park Railway). It was given the designation 199 103.

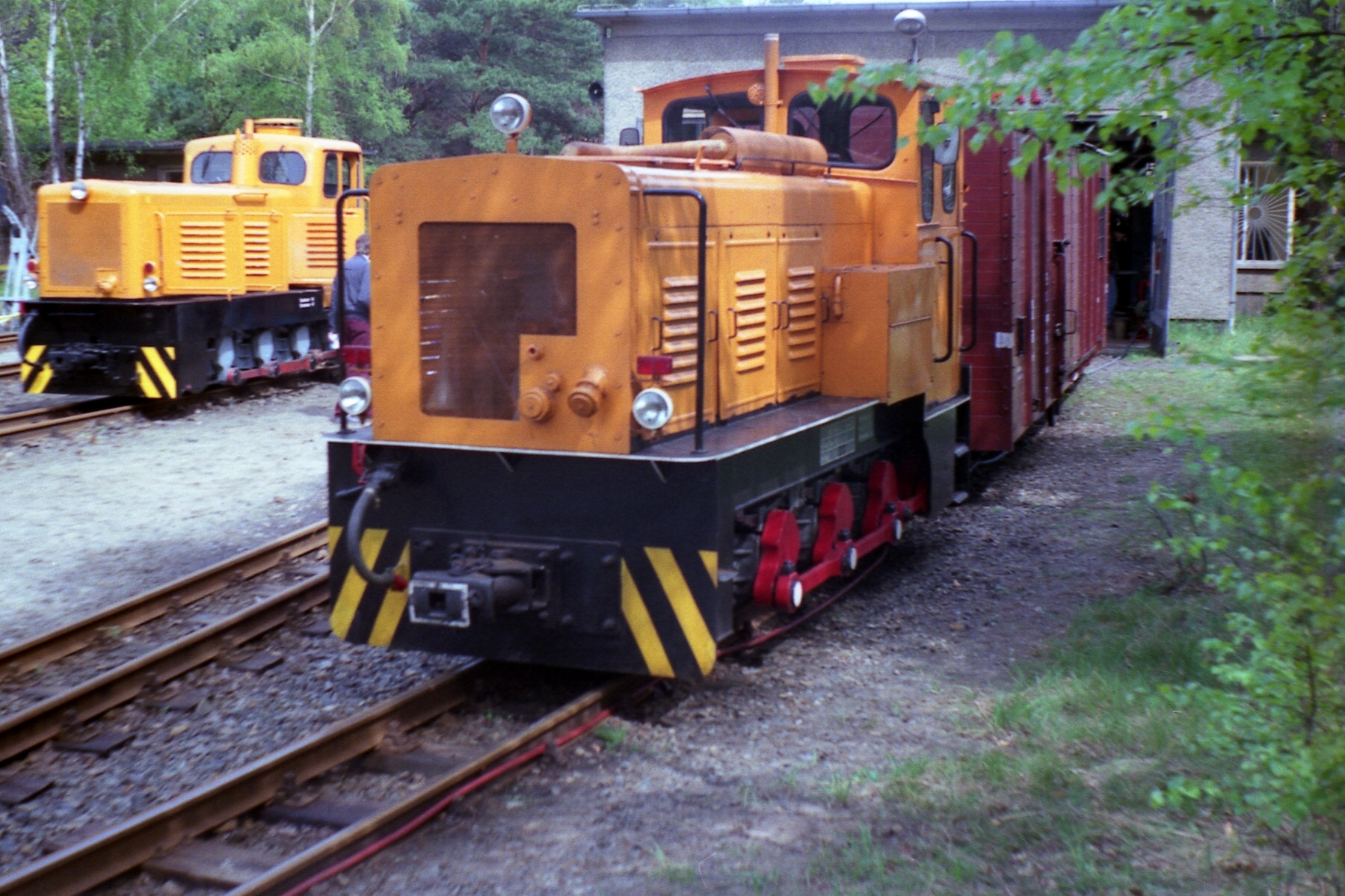
399 603 (199 103) Berlin, 3 Mai 1992

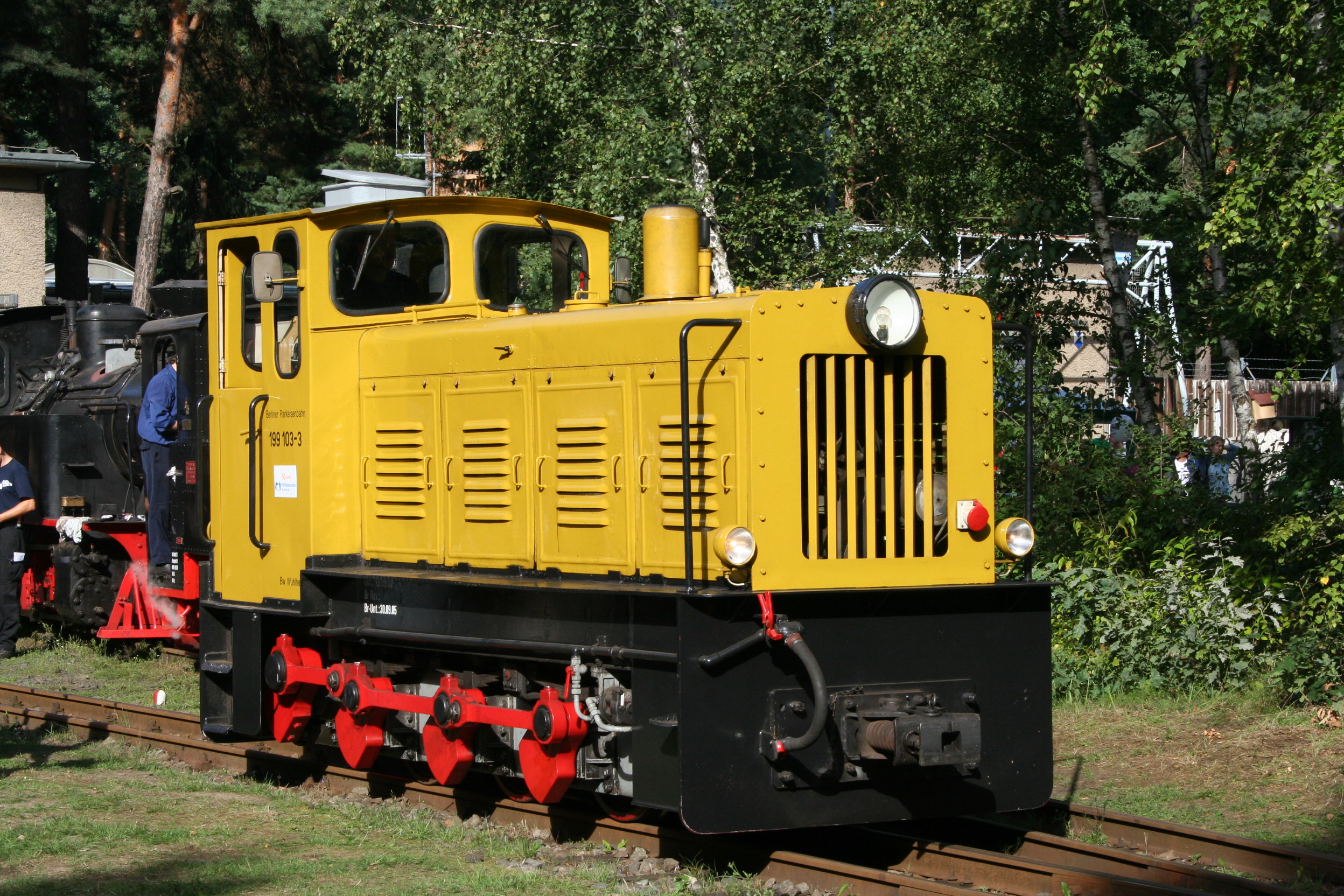
199 103 Berlin, 2 September 1996

=== LKM V 10 C ===
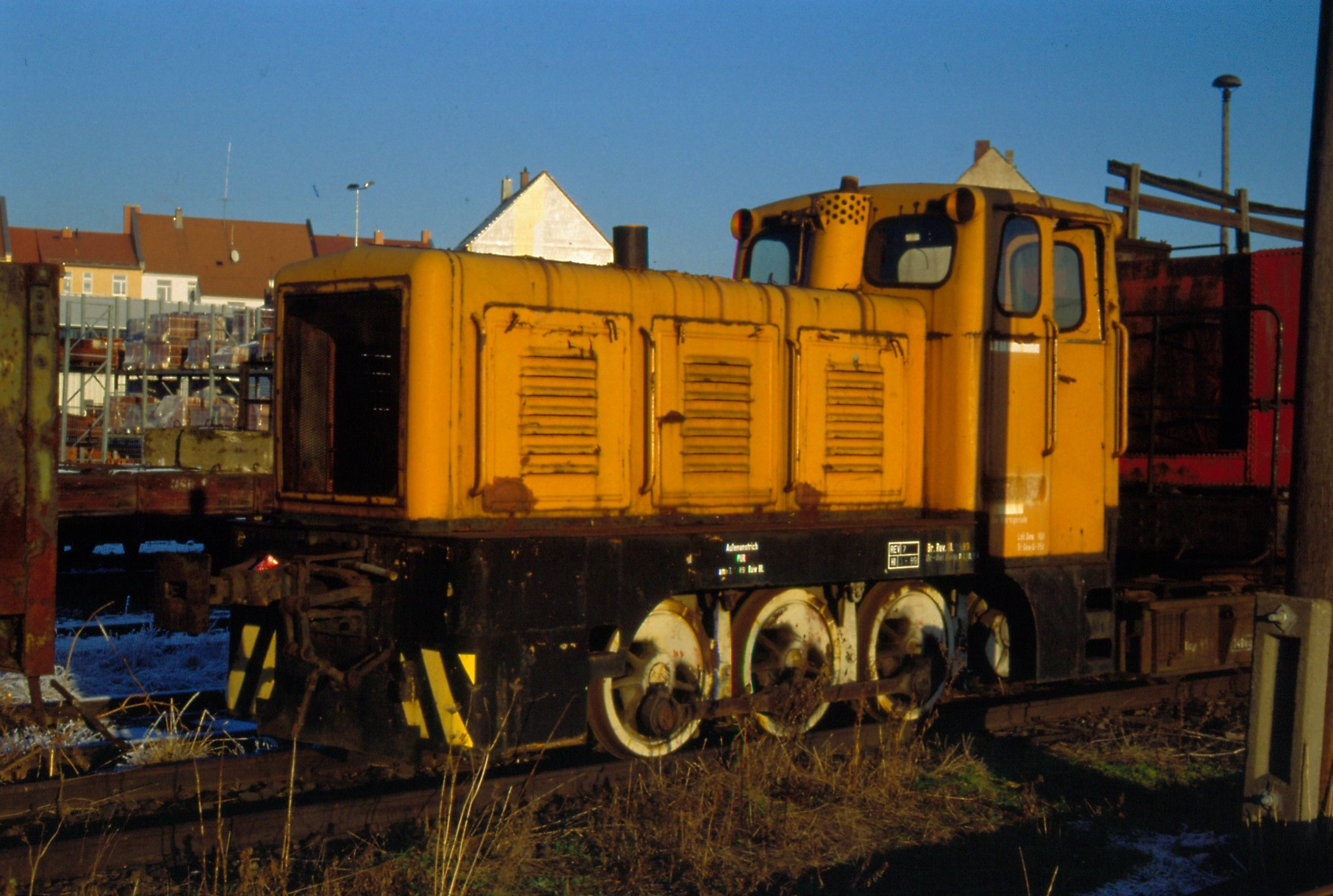
199 006 stored in Nordhausen

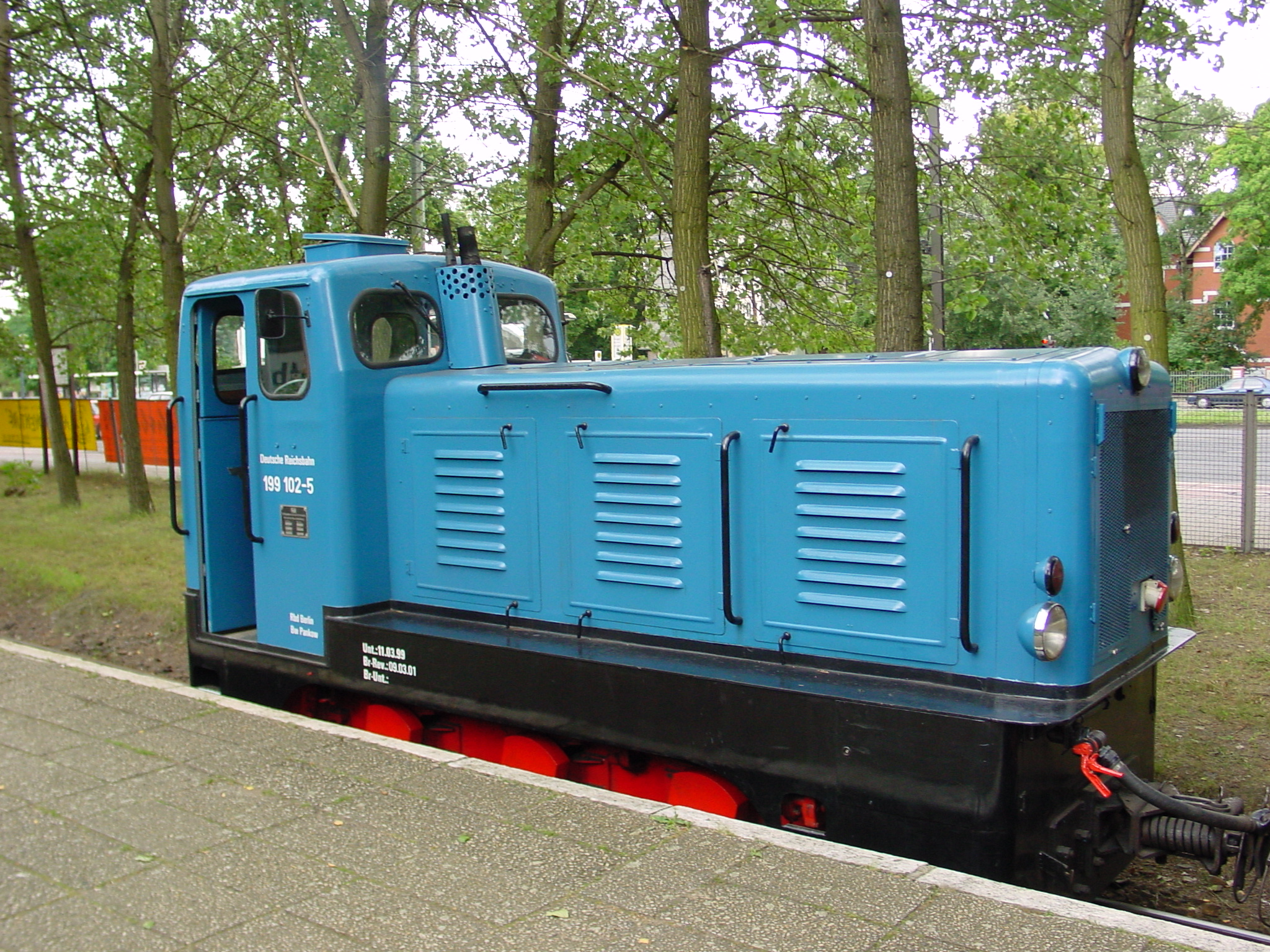
199 102 of the Berlin Park Railway

The locomotives of Type V 10 C were further developed by LKM Babelsberg from the Ns 4, production of which had ceased in 1958. The first engines were delivered in 1959. They inherited the drive concept from the Ns 4, which was achieved once again via a jack axle under the driver's cab with coupling rods to the axles. Once again four gears were provided. On locomotives up to 760 mm (2 ft 5 15/16 in) gauge the axles had an outside frame, on larger gauges they had an inside frame. The engines were equipped with air-cooled diesel engines, 6 KVD 14.5 SRL generating 102 horsepower (76 kW), made by the VEB Diesel Engineering Works at Schönebeck.

Two 1,000 mm (3 ft 3 3/8 in), metre-gauge, examples of this type, built in 1964, initially in service in Gotha at an industrial firm, went to the Spreewald Railway in 1970. There they were given numbers 100 905 and 906; from 1973: 199 005 and 006. Later they went to the Harz Narrow Gauge Railways. They were retired in 1991 but were given, on paper at least, numbers 399 112 and 113. No. 199 005 is now with the Harz Narrow Gauge Railways Society.

Two 600 mm (1 ft 11 5/8 in) locos of this type used on the Berlin Park Railway in Berlin (formerly the Pioniereisenbahn Wuhlheide) were numbered as 199 101 and 102 in DR vehicle fleet.

=== Kö II ===
Existing locomotives of Type Kö II and Kb II were re-gauged and reclassified for shunting duties on 1,000 mm (3 ft 3 3/8 in) lines.

- 199 003^{II}, regauged in 1983 in RAW Halle, ex 100 128, from 1992 renumbered to 399 110, mustered out in 1992. This loco comes from a series of Köf remakes that were built in RAW Dessau in the 1960–1962 (Kö 4001 to 4032).
- 199 004^{II}, regauged in 1983 in RAW Halle, ex 100 287, from 1992 renumbered to 399 111, mustered out 1992.

Both locomotives were substitutes for the Ns 3 on the Halle industrial line. After its closure, both locos were stored for years on a flat wagon, which was stabled in Bw Halle G, and finally ended up in the Harz, from there it went in 2006 to BSW Gruppe Traditionsgemeinschaft Bw Halle P e. V., Halle: "199 003-5" and "199 004-3". Since 11 June 2007, no. 199 003 has belonged to the IG Hirzberg Railway and since 13 June has been based in Georgenthal.

- 199 010: regauged in 1985, ex Kb 4325 bzw. 100 325, in service with the Harz Narrow Gauge Railways (in 1992 for a while as 399 114).
- 199 011 and 012: regauged in 1991, ex Kö 4639 and 100 639 and Kb 4113 and 100 213, in service with the Harz Narrow Gauge Railways (in 1992 for a while as 399 115 and 399 116).

=== Remarks ===
DR Class V 30 C and DR Class V 36.48 were not used by the Reichsbahn as Kleinloks.

== See also ==
- Class 99 (German narrow gauge locomotives)

== Sources ==
- Horst J. Obermayer: Taschenbuch Deutsche Diesellokomotiven. Franckh, Stuttgart 1972, ISBN 3-440-03932-3
- Klaus Kieper, Reiner Preuß: Schmalspurbahnarchiv. transpress VEB Verlag for Verkehrswesen, Berlin 1980.

also under the title:

- Klaus Kieper, Reiner Preuß: Schmalspur zwischen Ostsee und Erzgebirge, Alba Buchverlag, Düsseldorf 1980, ISBN 3-87094-069-7
