= Köf =

Köf may refer to one of a series of small German locomotives or Kleinlokomotiven including:

- DRG Kleinlokomotive Class I - strictly speaking these were Kö, not Köf locomotives as they did not have hydraulic transmission.
- DRG Kleinlokomotive Class II (although, not all of this class were Köf locomotives)
- DB Class Köf III
- Other small locomotive classes including some of the Heeresfeldbahnlokomotiven
- Kof, the Hebrew word for monkey
