= KOF =

KOF or Kof may refer to:

- Kaph, letter of the Hebrew alphabet
- The King of Fighters, a series of video games
- The economic research institute Konjunkturforschungsstelle at ETH Zurich
- Köf (disambiguation), various German locomotives
