= Class 332 =

Class 332 may refer to:

- British Rail Class 332
- DB Class Köf III, 332 class from 1968
