= DB Class V 51 and V 52 =

Class of narrow gauge diesel-hydraulic locomotives

DB Class V 51 and V 52 (after 1968 Class 251 and 252)
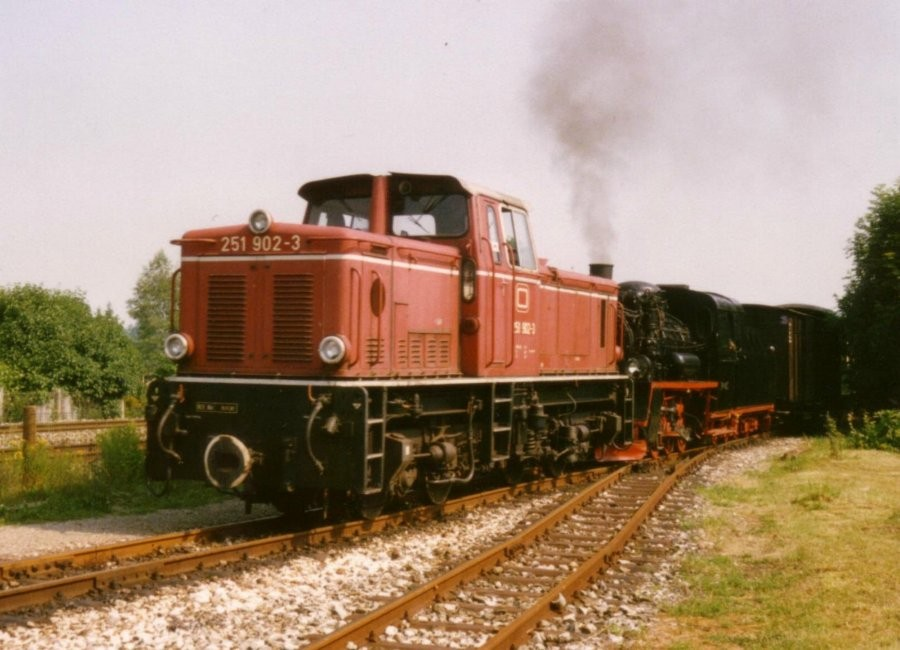
- 251 902 with a steam engine at Warthausen station, 1988
Type and origin
- Power type: Diesel-hydraulic
- Builder: Gmeinder (under license)
- Serial number: V 51 901 to 903; V 52 901 to 902
- Total produced: V 51 : 3; V 52 : 2
Specifications
- Configuration
  - UIC: B′B′
- Gauge: V 51 : 750 mm (2 ft 5 1/2 in); V 52 : 1,000 mm (3 ft 3 3/8 in)
- Wheel diameter: 850 mm (33 in) (new)
- Minimum curve: 70 m (230 ft)
- Wheelbase: 1,700 mm (67 in)(bogies); 4.080 m (13 ft 4.6 in) (between pivot pins)
- Length: V 51 : 9.81 m (32 ft 2 in); V 52 : 9.78 m (32 ft 1 in); (over couplings)
- Width: 2.400 m (7 ft 10.5 in)
- Height: 3.484 m (11 ft 5.2 in)
- Loco weight: 39.0 t (38.4 long tons; 43.0 short tons)
- Fuel capacity: 1,800 L (400 imp gal; 480 US gal)
- Prime mover: 2 x MWM TRHS 518A
- Transmission: Hydraulic (TwinDisc)
Performance figures
- Maximum speed: 40 km/h (25 mph)
- Power output: 2x 198 kW (266 hp)
- Tractive effort: starting 134 kN (30,000 lb_{f})
Career
- Retired: from DB: V 51 901 : 23.02.1971; V 51 902 : 31.03.1983; V 51 903 : 31.03.1983; V 52 001 : ~1973/4; V 52 002 : ~1973/4
- Sources : except were noted

The DB V 51 and DB V 52 (from 1968: DB Class 251 and Class 252) are two classes of narrow-gauge diesel-hydraulic locomotives built in 1964 for the Deutsche Bundesbahn. The Class V 51 were built for 750 mm (2 ft 5 1/2 in) and the Class V 52 for 1,000 mm (3 ft 3 3/8 in) gauge lines respectively. The locomotives were built to replace steam locomotives on the narrow gauge lines in Baden-Württemberg and apart from the gauge are identical. Due to line closures the locomotives did not work for long for the Deutsche Bundesbahn, and subsequently worked for different private companies in Italy, Spain and Austria.

== Background ==
In the early 1960s the narrow-gauge railways of Baden-Württemberg were still operated by 13 steam locomotives. To enable their withdrawal, and to continue operations on the 750 mm and 1,000 mm gauge railways, the state of Baden-Württemberg subsidised the production of diesel locomotives by the Deutsche Bundesbahn.

=== Development and design ===
Thus the Deutsche Bundesbahn was asked to provide locomotives with suitably low axle load, suitable for both freight and passenger work, and which were suitable for use on small radius curves. High speed was not a primary requirement, more so ease of maintenance and a reliable design.

A design for a four-axle, twin-bogie locomotive was developed based on the MaK 400 BB built in 1959 for the Alsen´sche Portland-Cementfabrik KG. Apart from the rail gauge and couplings both classes shared the same design. All had two MWM diesel engines each with an output of 270 hp (200 kW) @ 1600 rpm. located in the longer end. The shorter end contained the auxiliary diesel engine, the batteries, the compressor and the diesel tanks.

The transmission was via a TwinDisc 11500 MS450 torque converter with a MaK 3.162.04 final drive. The locomotive's maximum service speed was 40 km/h (25 mph) though the actual top speed was around 65 km/h (40 mph). The Sifa safety system was fitted but not Indusi because of the slow speeds the trains used on the branch lines.

=== Construction ===
The locomotives were constructed by Gmeinder under license and delivered in 1964. Within each class the locomotives were numbered from 900 upwards - like narrow gauge steam locomotives had serial numbers 900 upwards.

=== Renumbering ===
In 1968 the locomotives class numbers were changed, the V 51 locomotives became Class 251 and the V 52 machines became Class 252. The serial numbers within each class remained unchanged.

Class		Loco number		Gmeinder Builder number	Notes
Pre 1968	Post 1968	Pre 1968	Post 1968	Gmeinder Builder number	Notes
V 51	251	V 51 901	251 901	5327	
V 51	251	V 51 902	251 902	5328	
V 51	251	V 51 903	251 903	5329	
V 52	252	V 52 901	252 901	5325	
V 52	252	V 52 902	252 902	5326	

== Work history ==
=== Class V 51 ===
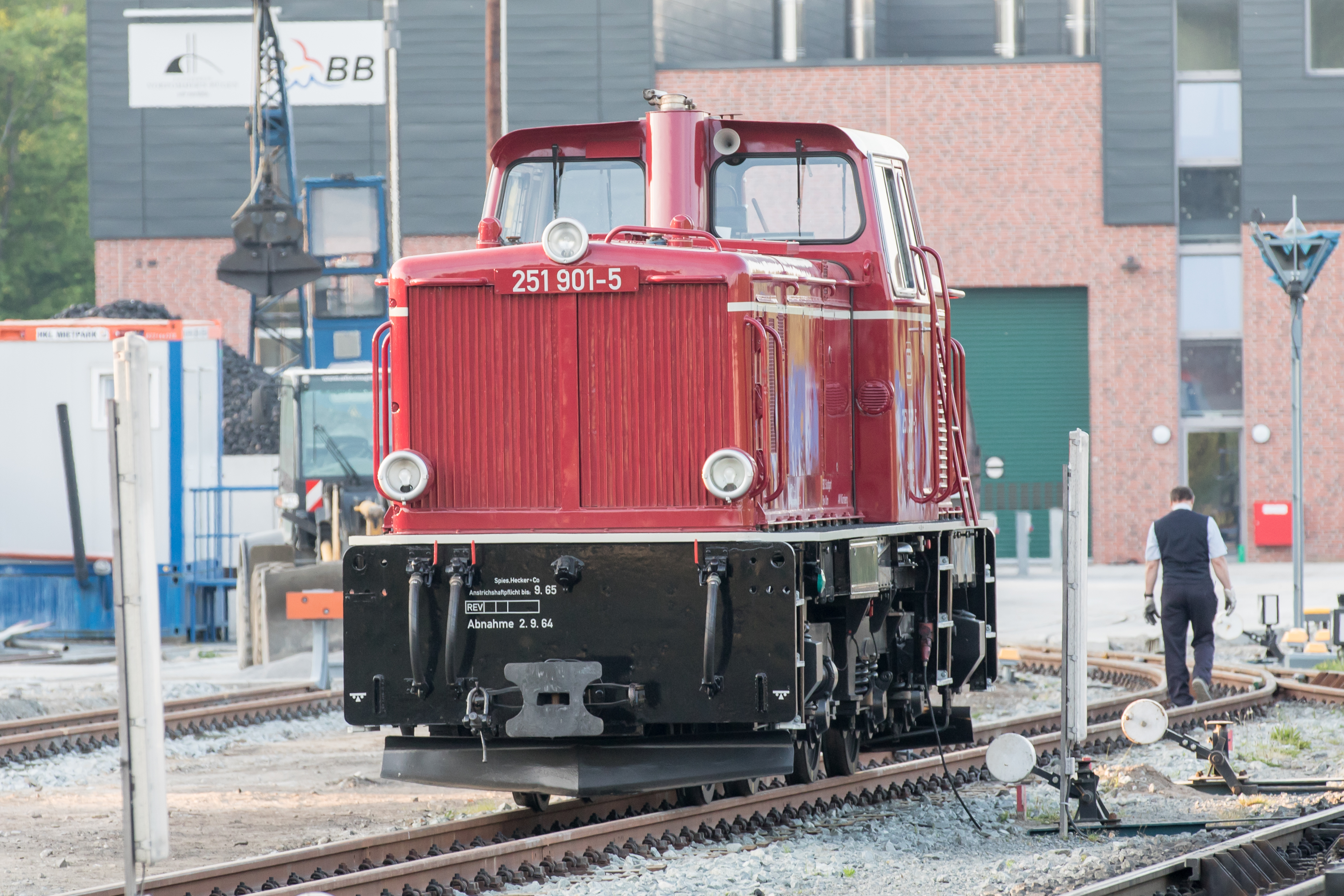
251 901 in May 2024 at Putbus

The three V 51 locomotives were delivered in 1964 to their respective lines: V 51 901 to the Federseebahn, V 51 902 to the Biberach-Warthausen-Ochsenhausen line (also known as the Öchsle) and V 51 903 to the Bottwartalbahn, where they replaced the old steam engines. All three locomotives performed well in their duties, however such trouble-free operation could not stop the decline of the Baden-Württemberg narrow gauge lines

After the closure of the Federseebahn in 1968, 251 901 moved to join 251 902 on the Bottwartalbahn. When the Bottwartalbahn also closed the two displaced locomotives were transferred to the Biberach-Ochsenhausen line in 1970 to replace steam locomotives. At this time the line still had substantial freight operations using rollbocks for the Liebherr refrigerator factory in Ochsenhausen, assuring that this section of the line remained open for almost 20 years after the end of passenger traffic and the closure of the section to Warthausen.

There was no need for all three locomotives on this shorter route so 251 901 was sold in 1971 to the Steiermärkische Landesbahnen (StLB) in Austria and regauged to 760 mm (2 ft 5 15/16 in). There the locomotive was renumbered to VL 21 and operated on the Thörlerbahn until 1998 when it was purchased by the Rügensche Kleinbahn. It has been regauged back to 750 mm and as of 2024 is in operation.

251 902 and 251 903 continued working on the Biberach to Ochsenhausen line, pulling freight trains, until its closure on 31 March 1983. After the closure 251 902 was bought from DB for use on the Warthausen-Ochsenhausen line under its new guise as a heritage railway It remained there until 1996 when the locomotive was withdrawn.

251 903 was sold in 1984 to the Italian firm Gleismac Italiana SpA in Gazzo di Bigarello and then in 1985 to the Spanish track company COMSA where it had exchange bogies for use on 1,000 mm (3 ft 3 3/8 in), 1,435 mm (4 ft 8 1/2 in) and 1,668 mm (5 ft 5 21/32 in) gauges. In 2009 the locomotive returned to the Öchsle railway and as of 2020 was under restoration and had been rebuilt back to 750 mm gauge.

=== Class V 52 ===
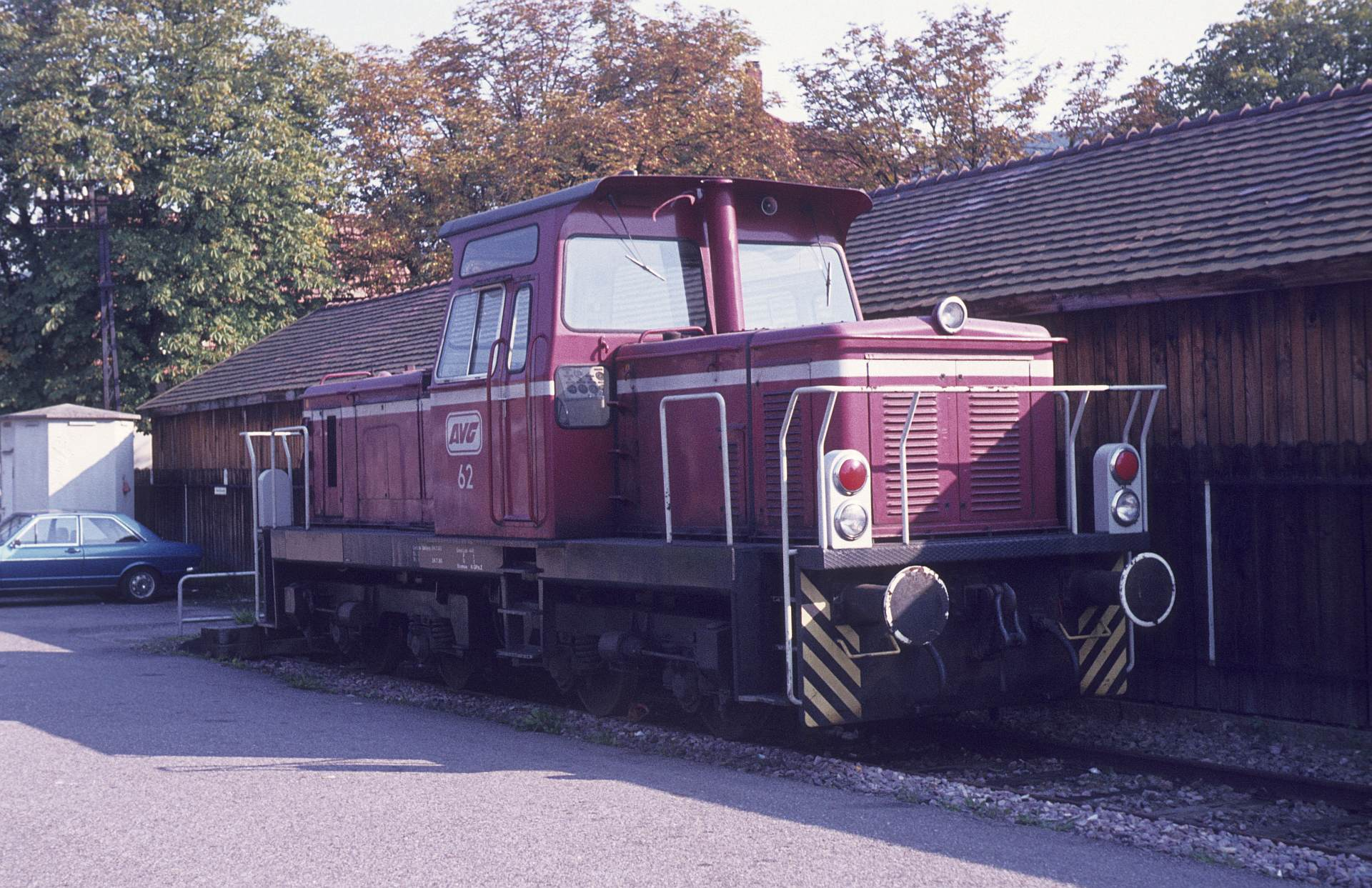
Albtalbahn 62 in 1982

The two V 52 locomotives were delivered in 1964 to the Mosbach-Mudau railway line to replace the 4 steam locomotives that were working there. The locomotives worked passenger services with four new passenger cars procured 1965 and goods traffic using rollbocks to transport standard-gauge freight wagons.

Despite the dieselisation the line closed in 1973. Both locomotives were rebuilt to standard gauge and sold to local private rail companies to recover the state grant which had been used in their purchase. Locomotive 252 901 became 62 on the Albtalbahn in Karlsruhe. As part of the rebuilding at Gmeinder the cab was broadened. The second locomotive, 252 902, was sold in 1974 to the Südwestdeutsche Eisenbahn-Gesellschaft mbH (SWEG), numbered VL 46-01 and used on the Kaiserstuhlbahn.

In 1985, both locomotives (along with 251 903 were sold to the Italian company Gleismac Italiana SpA in Gazzo di Bigarello. From there, in 1987, 252 901 went without any structural changes to the construction company Francesco Ventura SrL in Paola (southern Italy) where it was numbered as 7152 T. 252 902 was converted back to meter gauge and sold to the Genova–Casella railway (FGC) in 1986. Later in the 1990s work was undertaken on it to enable a snow plow to be fitted. The locomotive has been restored between 2008 and 2015 by the Italian company Tesmec based in Monopoli (BA) and as of 2021 is in working condition.
