= Gmeinder =

German locomotive and engineering company

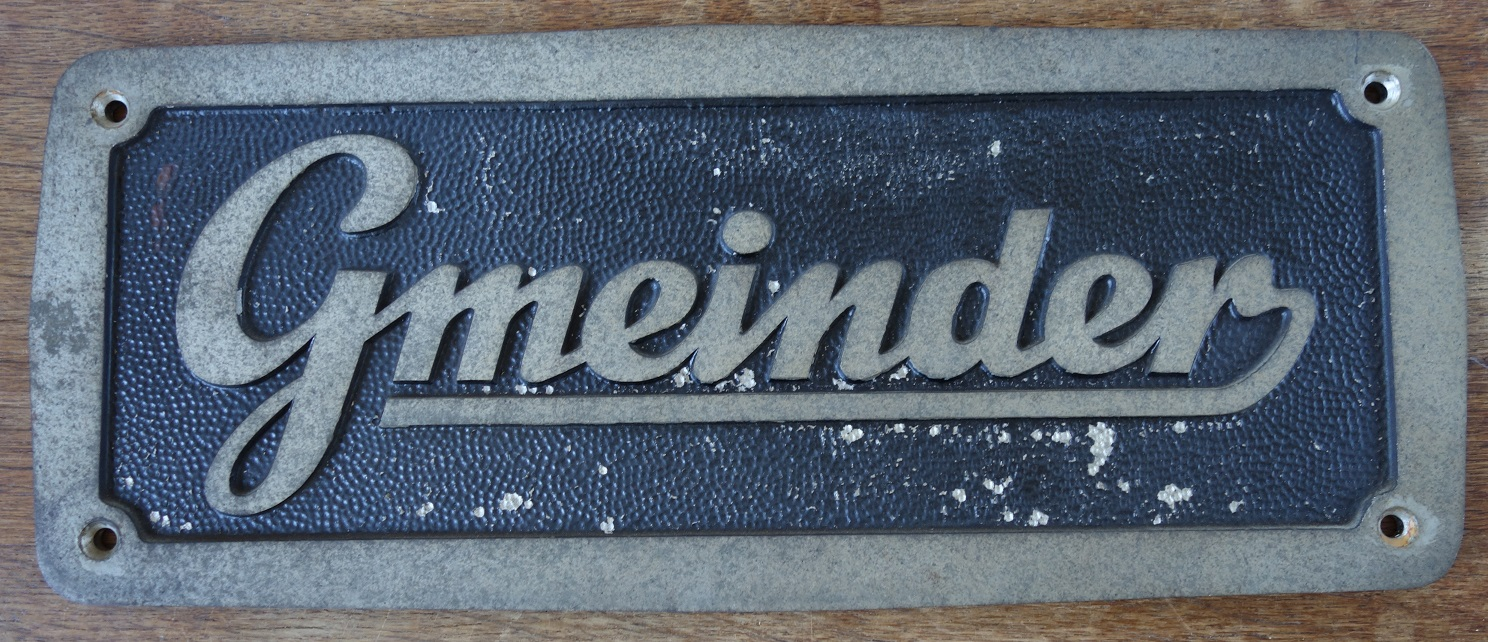
- Industry: Railway engineering and locomotives
- Fate: Sold off locomotive building business - becomes two separate companies
- Successor: Gmeinder Lokomotivenfabrik; Gmeinder Getriebe- und Maschinenfabrik
- Headquarters: Mosbach, Germany
- Website: Gmeinder Lokomotivenfabrik; Gmeinder Getriebe- und Maschinenfabrik

Gmeinder GmbH was a German locomotive and engineering company based in Mosbach. Its products included diesel engines, small locomotives (shunters) and other railway locomotive parts. Much of its business came through the German railways, though it also exported to the rest of Europe and the rest of the world.

From 2004 onwards the company was split into two separate concerns - Gmeinder Lokomotivenfabrik which manufactures locomotives and Gmeinder Getriebe- und Maschinenfabrik which makes components - specifically railway axle gearboxes.

== History ==
In 1913 The company Steinmetz Gmeinder KG was founded in Mosbach by Anton Gmeinder and August Steinmetz, six years later the company name was changed to "A. Gmeinder & Cie.". The same year a locomotive with a petrol engine was made. In 1925 another change of identity occurred - with the organisation becoming Gmeinder & Co. GmbH with Anton Gmeinder and Carl and Hermann Kaelble as co-partners.

In 1964 with financial support from the state of Baden-Württemberg Gmeider built a small series of narrow-gauge diesel locomotives of 750 mm (2 ft 5 1/2 in) gauge series V 51 and 1,000 mm (3 ft 3 3/8 in) gauge V 52 for the Bundesbahn to replace the outdated steam engines that were still in use.

Its locomotive factory was one of the major manufacturers of small and medium-sized diesel engines as well as producing small locomotives. Although Deutsche Bundesbahn was a major customer many of the industrial locomotives it produced were sold to private companies and exported around the world.

In 1976 merged with the truck manufacturer Carl Kaelble GmbH from Backnang. Due to the truck manufacturer's large contract with Libya and as a result of a trade embargo with that country it became bankrupt in 1996.

From the ruins of that company Gmeider re-emerged again as a locomotive manufacturer Gmeinder Getriebe- und Lokomotivenfabrik GmbH completely split from Kaeble. Kaeble became a construction machinery manufacturer and now is part of the Terex corporation.

In 2003 the sale of the locomotive section of Gmeinder Getriebe- und Lokomotivenfabrik GmbH brings about the existence of two separate companies named 'Gmeider' : they are Gmeinder Lokomotivenfabrik and Gmeinder Getriebe- und Maschinenfabrik

=== Gmeinder Lokomotivenfabrik ===
In March 2008 at the station of Neckarbischofsheim a new factory was brought into operation in which locomotives are upgraded or repaired, the Krebsbach valley railway is used for test runs.

Current products include a range of 2, 3 and 4 locomotives; both with hydraulic or electric transmission systems. Locomotive upgrades, repairs, and diagnostics are also carried out for a range of locomotives and engines owned by private companies. Explosion proof locomotives and other vehicles are also made in cooperation with clients.

=== Gmeinder Getriebe- und Maschinenfabrik ===
This company produces axle gearboxes which are used in locomotives, trams, metros and other rail vehicles.

In 2019, the Gmeinder Getriebe Gruppe was acquired by the Czech engineering group Wikov Group. In 2020, most of its companies were merged into GGT GMEINDER GETRIEBETECHNIK GmbH.

== Locomotives ==
=== Historical Series ===
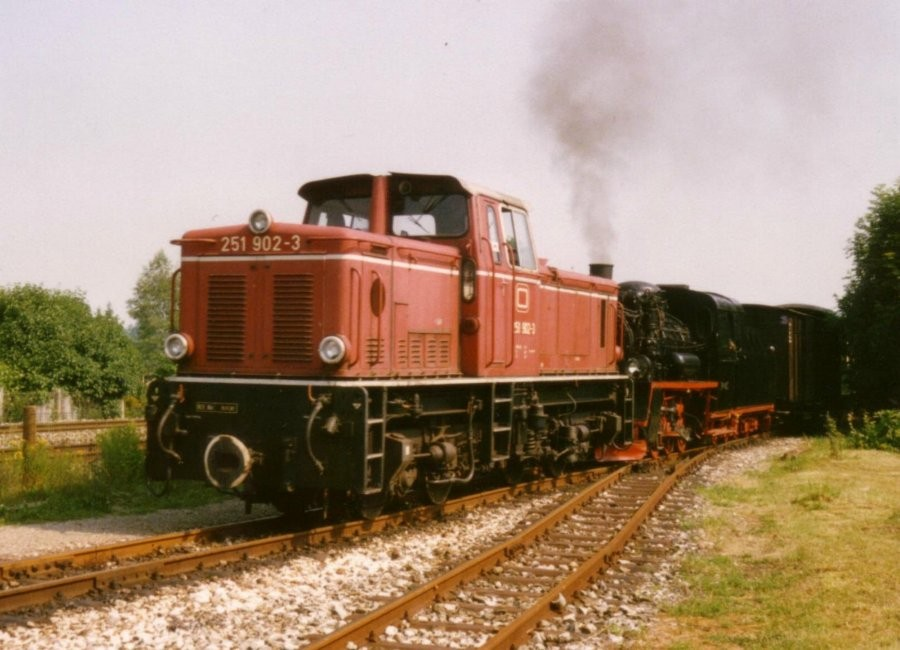
DB class 251 formerly DB Class V 51

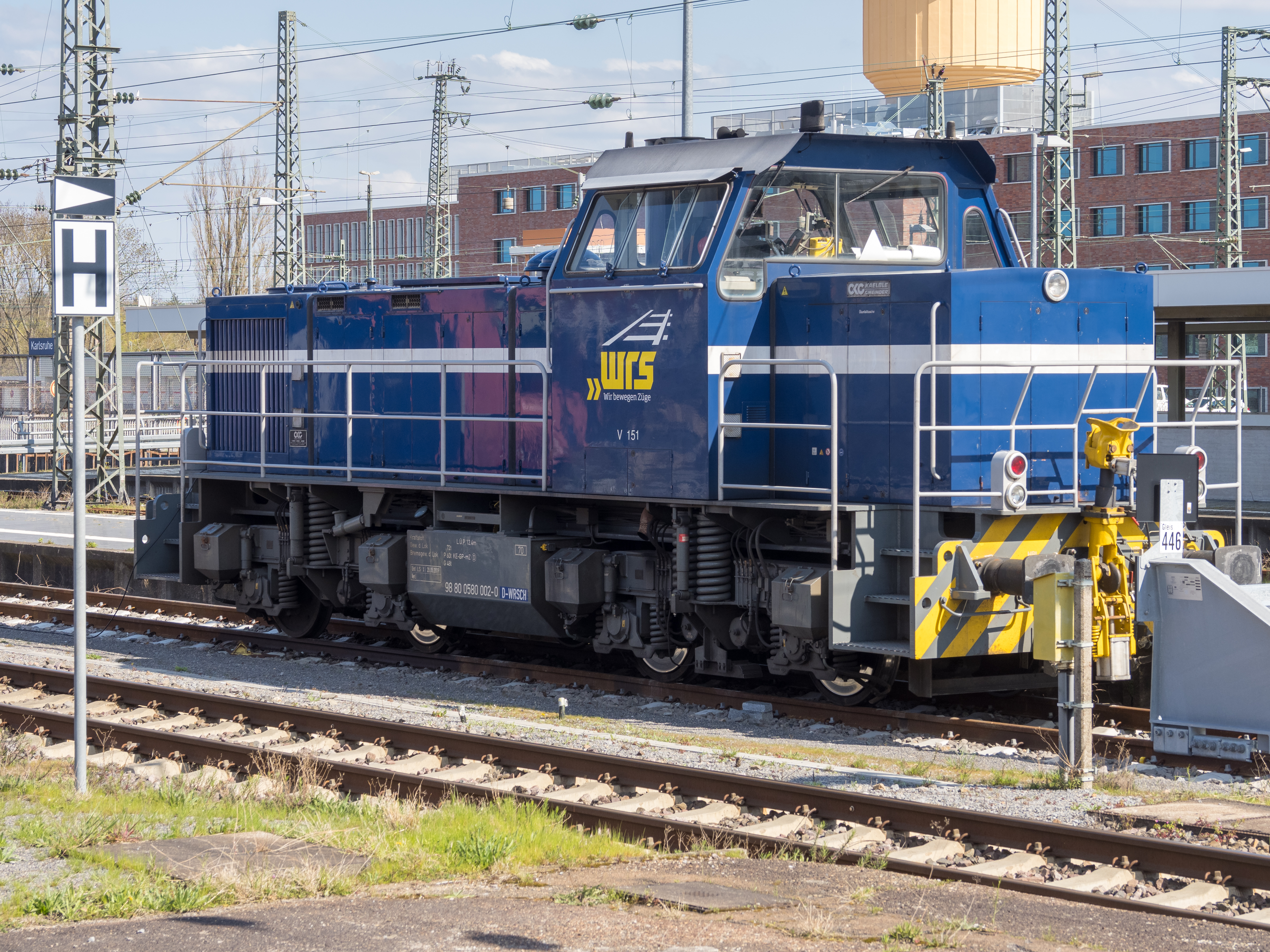
Gmeinder D 100 BB operated by Widmer Rail Service

Amongst others:

- Werkslok of Eilenburger Zelluloidwerks, 1949
- Kleinlokomotive Kö I
- Kleinlokomotive Köf II
- Heeresfeldbahnlokomotive HF 130 C : Army Field Railway locomotive
- Wehrmachtslokomotive WR 200 B 14 : Wehrmacht locomotive
- DB Class Köf III
- DB Class 329
- DB Class V 60
- DB Class V 51
- DB Class V 52
- Railbuses: WEG T 23 and 24

There is a collection of narrow-gauge Gmeinder locomotives at the Wiesloch Feldbahn and Industrial Museum, approximately 20 kilometres to the west of the original factory.

=== Current Locomotives ===
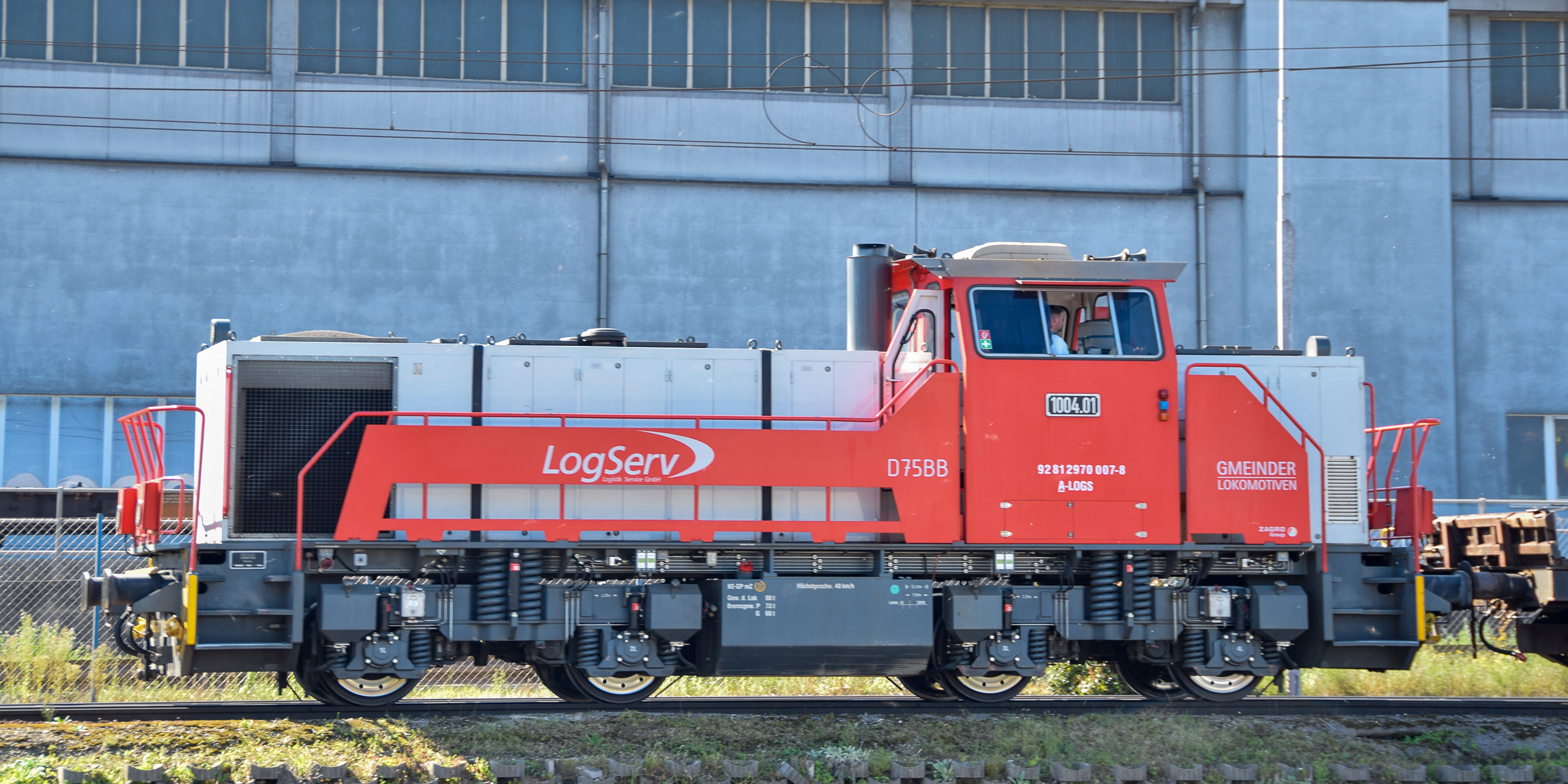
Gmeinder D 75 BB diesel locomotive

In 2009 Gmeinder Lokomotivenfabrik product ranged included standard (1435mm) gauge types D 25 B two axle shunter (45tonnes, top speed 15 km/h), D 60 C three axle loco (60 to 67.5 tonnes, top speed 60 km/h), D 75 B´B´ four axle locos, power from 571 to 1050 kW, weight 82 to 90 tonnes, top speed 25 to 50 km/h, D 110 B´B´ (1100 kW, 1435mm shunting and short distance loco, 80tonnes maximum), and a 760mm gauge type D 75 B´B´ SE designed for passenger and freight operations on the Zillertalbahn (50 tonnes) In 2011 the D 180 BB, an 1800 kW, 100 to 120 km/h top speed B'B' diesel locomotive was added to the range.

=== Special locomotives ===
- Gmeinder U.S. 500 (Diesel Electric Shunting EN 500 with AC Propulsion)
- Gmeinder AL1 (Dual power : diesel-electric or battery-electric propulsion)
- Gmeinder E / DE (Diesel-electric / electric locomotive)

=== Rebuilt and repaired locomotives ===
Gmeinder DH 280.01 (conversion from the Deutsche Bahn V 169/219 series) (see DB Class V 169 )

== See also ==
The NSW 73 Class shunting locomotives (built 1970-1973) used GM170/EHA/469 and GM170/E/327B final drives.

The British Rail prototypes Class 140 and Class 150 DMUs used Gmeinder final drives, as do the British rail classes 165 and 166 and British Rail Class 158 still in service as of 2009.

The Deutsche Bundesbahn class V 200 number 053 was refurbished and re-engined by Gmeinder and is now fitted with CAT D3508 engines.(See: DB Class V 200#Germany).

== Literature ==
Rudolf Mickel: Gmeinder-Lokomotiven EK-Verlag, Freiburg 2004 ISBN 3-88255-865-2
