= DRG Kleinlokomotive Class I =

Class of German shunting locomotives

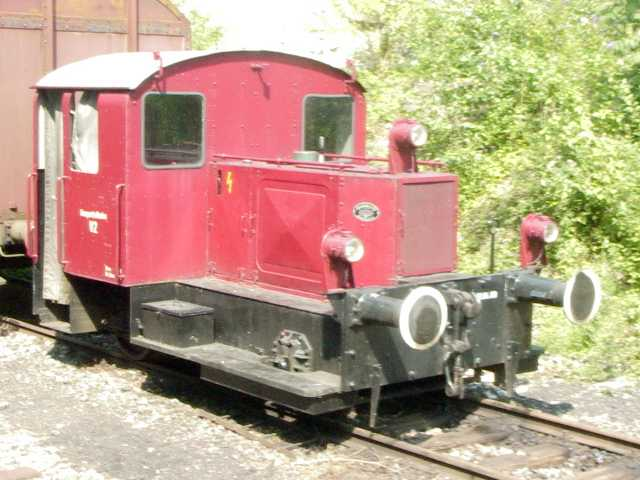
Kleinlokomotive Kö 0281

The Kleinlokomotiven (literally: small locomotives) of Class I were light German locomotives of low weight and power (up to 40 PS) designed for shunting duties. They were placed in service by the Deutsche Reichsbahn (DRG) after trials had been carried out on several prototype locomotives in 1930. The power source for these locomotives was either a diesel or petrol engine.

== History ==
After the Deutsche Reichsbahn had initially obtained several trials locomotives in 1930, it took delivery of production Kleinloks in 1931 and split them into two classes or 'power groups'. Locomotives in power group I, with an engine power of up to 40 PS (29 kW), were intended for shunting at small stations and in simple situations.

As a result of the new numbering scheme two of the trials engines from 1930 were also included in Class I. These were locomotives V 6016 and V 6017 (from 1931 Kö 0001 and Kö 0002) delivered by the Fürst-Stolberg-Hütte works at Ilsenburg. They did not acquit themselves well due to numerous defects and were retired again by 1932. Whilst, as early as 1931, the DRG had issued several specifications for locomotives in Class II, for Class I it simply ordered locomotives of the manufacturer's designs between 1931 and 1934, in order to keep procurement costs down. These locomotives were delivered by Jung, Orenstein & Koppel, Windhoff and Gmeinder. They were not permitted to leave the station, because they were too light to achieve reliable rail contact.

== The Einheitskleinlokomotiven ==
Once it had been demonstrated that the employment of low power Class I locomotives was economical, the project team developed a standard, small locomotive (Einheitskleinlokomotive) for the DRG. This was heavily based on the latest delivery from Gmeinder. As a result, the entire locomotive, apart from the diesel engine, was standardised. The footplate on the locomotives was open at the sides and all controls were duplicated on both sides of the engine. The Kleinlokomotiven had buffers and a very simple shunting coupling, that could be automatically coupled and then released using a foot pedal. Transmission was achieved from the engine using simple roller chains on both axles.

The locomotives only had a foot brake and no compressed air brake.

The first type of Einheitskleinlokomotive was further evolved in 1935 into a more robust and powerful model. This was given a much stronger frame and more powerful engine. Due to their greater weight these locomotives were allowed to range outside of stations.

In order to be able to use home-produced fuels, from 1942 to 1945 many locomotives were converted and driven on liquefied petroleum gas (LPG). After the Second World War they were converted back again however to diesel operation.

=== Technical data ===
DRG Class I Einheitskleinlok – DRG/DB/DR Kö* I / DB 311 / DR 100.0
	1934 standard class	1935 class	1936 class
Numbering:	Kö 0080, 0105–0184	Kö 0185–0244	Kö 0245–0289
Manufacturer:	Gmeinder, Windhoff, Esslingen		Gmeinder
Year(s) of manufacture:	1934–35	1935–36	1936–38
Retired:	1945–89		
Axle arrangement:	B		
Track gauge:	1,435 mm (4 ft 8 1/2 in)		
Length over buffers:	5,475 mm (17 ft 11.6 in)	5,575 mm (18 ft 3.5 in)	
Height:	3,005 mm (9 ft 10.3 in)		3,025 mm (9 ft 11.1 in)
Width:	2,960 mm (9 ft 8.5 in)		2,962 mm (9 ft 8.6 in)
Overall wheelbase:	new 2,500 mm (8 ft 2.4 in)	new 2,506 mm (8 ft 2.7 in)	
Smallest curve radius:	50 m (164 ft)		
Service weight:	ca. 8 t (7.9 long tons; 8.8 short tons)	ca. 10 t (9.8 long tons; 11.0 short tons)	
Top speed:	18 km/h (11 mph) / 23 km/h (14 mph)		
Installed Power:	18–22 kW (24–30 hp)	26–29 kW (35–39 hp) / 37 kW (50 hp)**	
Driving wheel diameter:	new 850 mm (33.46 in)		
Fuel supplies:	56 L (12 imp gal; 15 US gal) diesel fuel*		
Engine type:	various water-cooled/air-cooled** diesel engines*		
Transmission:	mechanical (gear, roller chain)		
Locomotive brake:	foot brake		
Train brake:	–		
*1942–45 Many locomotives operated on LPG and became Class Kb **in the DB more powerful air-cooled diesel engines were installed by 1962

== Post 1945 ==
The Deutsche Bundesbahn retired the manufacturer-designed Kleinlokomotiven and the 1934 standard class engines by 1963. They also standardised the rest of the Kleinloks between 1954 and 1962. As part of that, the locomotives were given the more powerful, air-cooled, 50 PS, Deutz F4L514 engines. As a result of this increase in power the numbering system was changed – from then on, locomotives with a power of up to 50 PS were allocated to Class I.

The Kleinlokomotiven in Class I were ousted by those in classes II and III. In addition the traffic in part-load goods fell, so that most of the engines were retired by the DB in the 1960s and 1970s.

In the Deutsche Reichsbahn there was an attempt to introduce a standard engine type, otherwise there were only minor modifications. In the 1970s they too retired most of the locomotives. Some of the retirements were officially called conversions; actually a new Class II locomotive was built by the Dessau shop (Reichsbahnausbesserungswerk or Raw).

== Preserved ==
Several of the engines have been preserved in their original design and are in use. For example:

- Kö 0049 at Schwarzenberg/Erzgeb. Railway Museum
- Kö 0128 of the AG Märkische Kleinbahn in Berlin
- Kö 0130 is displayed in Pyskowice Railway Museum in Pyskowice
- Kö 0186 is displayed in the Art and Technology Gallery at Schorndorf.
- Kö 0281 as a V2 on the Hesper Valley Railway (Hespertalbahn)

== See also ==
- Deutsche Reichsbahn
- List of DRG locomotives and railbuses
- Kleinlokomotive
- DRG Kleinlokomotive Class II
- DB Class Köf III

== Sources ==
- Große, Peter; Troche, Horst (2002). Die Einheitskleinlokomotiven Leistungsgruppen I und II (in German). Freiburg: EK-Verlag. ISBN 3-88255-217-4.
