= AG Märkische Kleinbahn =

Railway museum in Berlin, Germany

Coordinates: 52°24′40″N 13°16′30″E

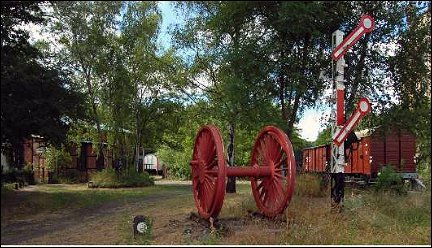
Site of the AG Märkische Kleinbahn in Lichterfelde

AG Märkische Kleinbahn, Berlin

The AG Märkische Kleinbahn or MKB in Berlin is a German railway museum and heritage railway, founded in 1981, with legal status as a society since 1982. It has set itself the task of preserving historical railway vehicles and other items of railway technology (e.g. signalling equipment, communication and safety equipment) in an operational state or for museum display and to make them accessible to the public. Their centre of operations is the locomotive shed at Schönow.

== Vehicles ==
The MKB's vehicles, sites and special exhibits are maintained voluntarily by members. As far as permission for railway operations is required, the inspections required by law are carried out by the Federal Railway Office (Eisenbahn-Bundesamt).

Operational vehicles which can move under their own power are:

MKB 01 – Kleinlokomotive Kö 0128, 25 PS diesel engine
MKB 51 – Rottenkraftwagen ex Klv-51, 75 PS diesel engine
MKB 52 – Motorised draisine ex Klv-12, 26 PS petrol engine
MKB 53 – Hand-operated draisine ex TCDD, human powered
MKB 55 – Motorised draisine ex MÁV, 14 PS petrol engine

In addition there are various goods wagons (some still being refurbished), a Behelfspersonenwagen of Prussian design and a railway post van (stored).

== Other exhibits ==
A ticket office based on a historical prototype, a ticket printing press, the training signal box "Frohnau" and the MKB's 'signal garden' give a glimpse behind the scenes of railway operations.

== Operations ==
The MKB is a co-user of the Zehlendorf Railway with operating rights on its former facilities. Rail services, as on other museum railways are not carried out by the MKB, whose operations are limited to shunting. Nevertheless, visitors may ride on the vehicles at the museum site. Each year in September the activities and progress with the society's work are exhibited to the public at an open day.

== Sources ==
de:AG Märkische Kleinbahn
