= Thörlerbahn =

The Thörlerbahn was a narrow-gauge railway with a gauge of 760 mm (2 ft 5 15/16 in), operated by the Styrian Provincial Railway (Steiermärkische Landesbahnen) between Kapfenberg and Au-Seewiesen in Austria. It connected the region around Aflenz in the Obersteiermark with the southern main line at Kapfenberg.

== History ==
The railway was originally planned as a section of a projected railway connection from the Mürztal to Mariazell, and was opened in 1893. The line brought an economic upswing to the region because of the availability of goods traffic, and the iron industry particularly profited from the introduction of rail transport. Passenger traffic never achieved great importance, since the railway line was not close to larger places like Aflenz or Turnau and the proposed connection to Mariazell was never realised.

Passenger traffic ceased on 15 March 1959 and the section from Seebach-Turnau to Au-Seewiesen was closed and removed in 1964. However, freight traffic from the iron industry in Thörl continued to develop positively. In the 1960s the railway changed over to diesel traction, modern wagons were procured, and the track upgraded to cope with the increased loads. Lastly, at the beginning of the 1990s, modern workshops were built at Kapfenberg.

The section from Aflenz to Seebach-Turnau, which only saw sporadic traffic in timber products, was closed at the end of 1990. In 1991, the Thörlerbahn Association, established to protect this section from demolition, proposed a tourist operation with borrowed vehicles. This offer was accepted and in the following years a promising museum course project was developed: passenger vehicles were built based on historical designs on freight wagon chassis and the last original steam engine, No. 6 THÖRL, also the last existing locomotive of class Z, was rented from Club 760 and re-activated.

A bank failure in 1995 led to the bankruptcy of the local iron industry. After the loss of the largest (and practically only) freight customer, the Styrian Provincial Railway felt compelled to close the railway. The Thörlerbahn Association was able to operate over the entire length of the railway until the end of the 1997 season, however for financial reasons were not able to take control of the entire 20 km length. There was a lack of support of the railway in the region, local preferences were to convert the railway into a bicycle track and to widen the federal highway. The Thörlerbahn Association announced bankruptcy in 1999, after not having operated the line during the preceding season, and the vehicles were sold or returned to their owners. On 31 October 1999 a hand trolley was driven on the Thörlerbahn for the last time.

The railway was dismantled in 2003 and 2004 and the line was converted to a bicycle track.
