= DB Class Köf III =

Class of German shunting locomotives

DB Series III Köf / DBAG Class 331, 332, 333, 335
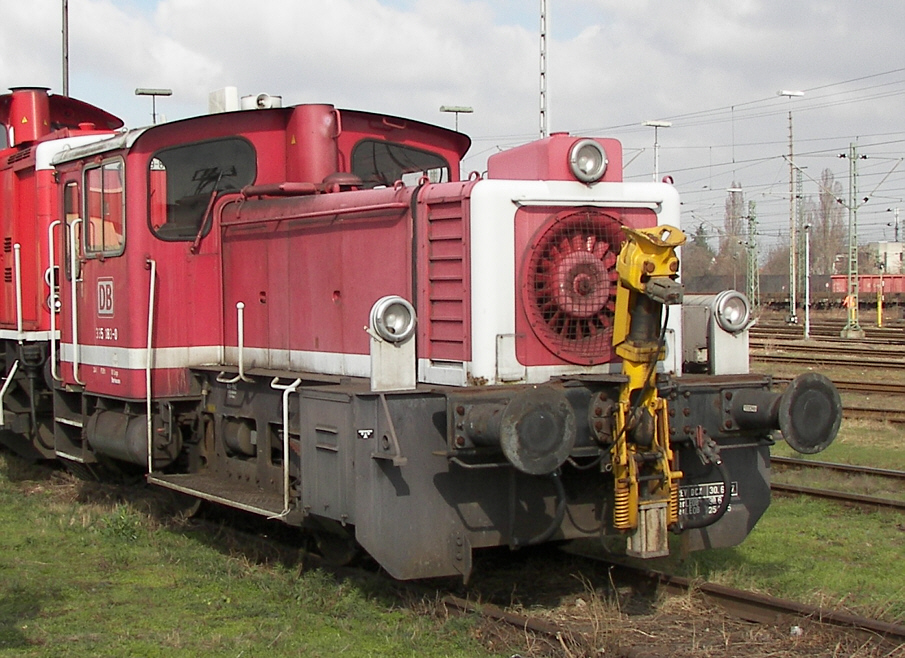
Type and origin
- Builder: Gmeinder, Jung, Orenstein & Koppel, Windhoff
Specifications
- Configuration
  - UIC: B
- Gauge: 1,435 mm (4 ft 8 1/2 in)
- Wheel diameter: 950 mm (3 ft 1 in) (new); 890 mm (2 ft 11 in) (worn)
- Wheelbase: 2,800 mm (9 ft 2 in)
- Length: 7,830 mm (25 ft 8 in)
- Width: 2,990 mm (9 ft 10 in)
- Height: 3,305 mm (10 ft 10 in)
- Axle load: 11.2 t (11.0 long tons; 12.3 short tons)
- Service weight: 20–23 t (19.7–22.6 long tons; 22.0–25.4 short tons) (331, 332); 22–24 t (21.7–23.6 long tons; 24.3–26.5 short tons) (333)
- Loco weight: 22 t (21.7 long tons; 24.3 short tons)
- Fuel type: Diesel fuel
- Fuel capacity: 300 L (66.0 imp gal; 79.3 US gal)
- Coolant cap.: 180 L (39.6 imp gal; 47.6 US gal)
- Sandbox cap.: 240 kg (529.1 lb)
- Prime mover: RHS 518A Motorenwerke Mannheim
- RPM range: 500–1600 rpm
- Engine type: Four-stroke, single-acting I8 diesel
- Displacement: 22.1 L (1,350 cu in)
- Transmission: Voith L 33 yUB (331); Voith L 213 (332); Voith L 203 KU (333) turbo transmission
- Train brakes: Knorr type air brakes
Performance figures
- Maximum speed: Class 331 Köf 10: 30 km/h (19 mph); Classes 332,333,335: 45 km/h (28 mph)
- Power output: 177 kW (240 hp)
- Tractive effort: Starting: 83.4 kN (18,750 lbf)
Career
- Number in class: 331: 3; 332: 317; 333/335: 251
- Numbers: Köf 10 001-003; 331 001–003; Köf 11 001-317; 332 002, 005–062, 064-210, 212-317, 601, 602, 701, 702, 801, 901; Köf 12 001; 333 001-251, 525..716, 335 004..251
- Locale: Germany
- Delivered: 1959–1965

The DB railways Köf III class (after 1968 named classes 331, 332, 333 and 335) are light two axle shunting locomotives of Deutsche Bahn AG.

== History ==
The German national railways had already procured small locomotives of classes Kö I (up to 39 hp or 29 kW) and Köf II (up to 149 hp or 111 kW for light shunting duties at small and medium-sized railway station. These locomotives were attached to their particular station and their use resulted in shortened travel times of mixed trains since the train locomotives did not need to complete all of the shunting work before the train could proceed to the next destination.

After the Second World War the small locomotives of the Köf II class were in much demand and overused, but the use of a more powerful shunting locomotive such as the Class V 60 was precluded, primarily for cost reasons: Small locomotives of the Köf type were cheaper to operate since the driver did not need to be a fully qualified locomotive driver.

In the 1950s, in order to close the gap between the small locomotives (German: Kleinlokomotive) and the V 60 the German Federal Railroad defined a new class of small locomotives - the Köf class III - as having a maximum power of 250 hp or 190 kW) and worked with the locomotive manufacturer Gmeinder to develop suitable locomotives.

In 1959 8 prototypes were delivered and given the temporary class name Köf 10 (maximum speed 30 km/h) and Köf 11 (max. speed 45 km/h). 5 were of the Köf 11 type, the other 3 were Köf 10. The K in Köf indicates the locomotive is a small locomotive, the ö indicates diesel fuel (from the German for 'oil'), alternatives are b for petrol (German:benzol), d for steam (German:Dampf) meaning vapor, s indicates battery power. The third letter indicates the transmission type - f here indicates hydraulic transmission (German:Flüssigkeitsgetriebe - "Fluid drive") - therefore the prefix Köf indicates a small locomotive with diesel engine and hydraulic power transmission.

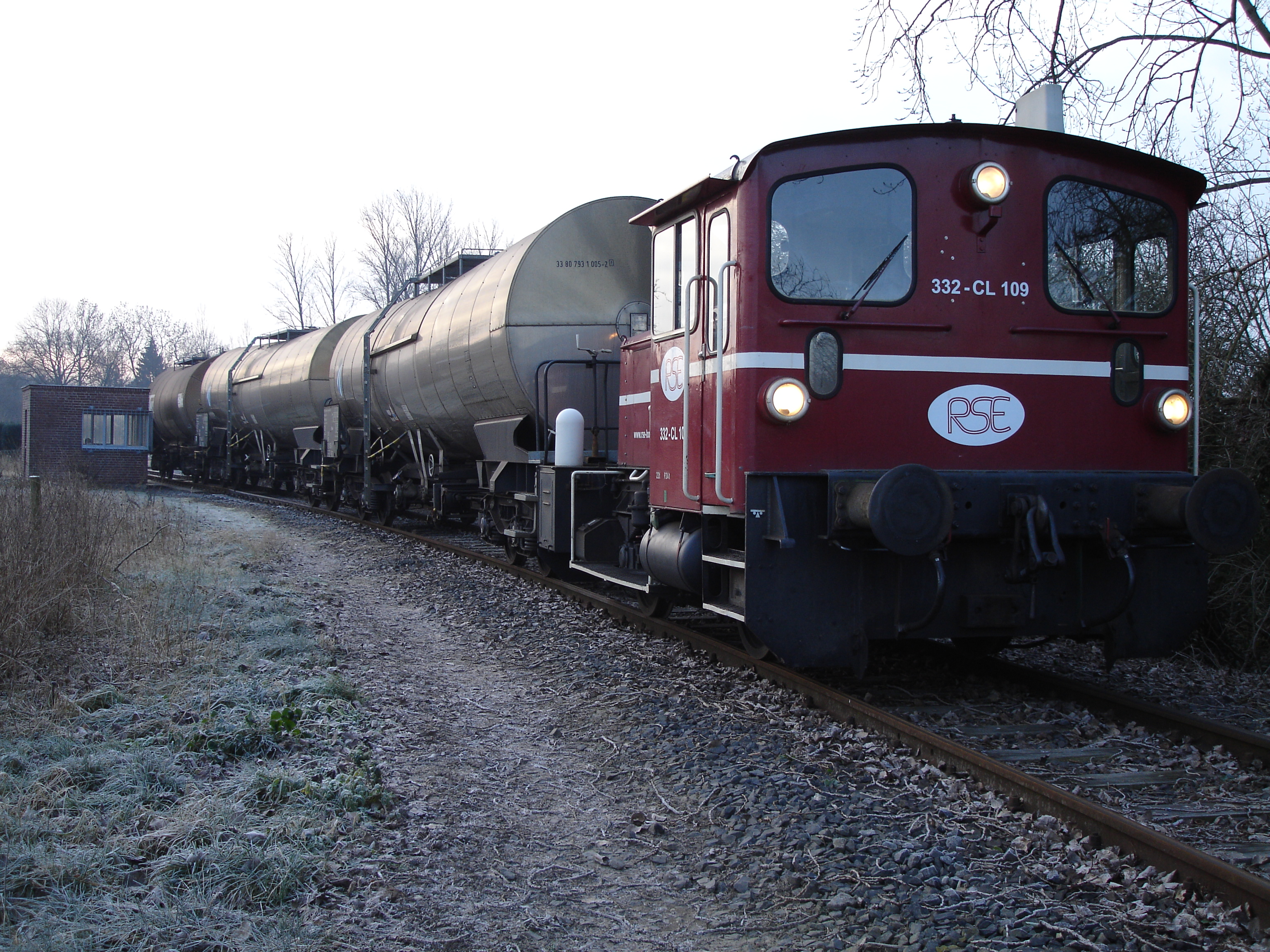
Köf 11 (Class 332) example

These 8 prototype models all differed in gearing and engine type for comparison purposes: this led to a standard locomotives with a Mannheim works engine of type RHS 518A with a nominal power of 177 kW (237 hp) and hydraulic transmission of type L213U from Voith, drive to the wheels was by chain drive - these were given the classification name: Köf 11

With the introduction of the new numbering scheme in 1968 (see DB locomotive classification for more details) the 317 locomotives built to this specification (including the 5 Köf 11 prototypes) were given the class number 332, the 3 slower Köf 10 prototypes received class number 331; when the maximum speed was raised to 45 km/h by rebuilding in the 80s 331 001 and 002 were reclassified as type 332 and received the numbers 332 601 and 602 respectively from 1992 onwards.

Experimental prototype locomotives Köf 11 numbers 001, 003, 004, 063 and 211 with other engine variations and gear variations received the numbers 332 701, 801, 702, 901 and 902 at the time of the reclassification.

In 1965 Gmeinder introduced an advancement of the Köf 11 design in which the final drive of the power transmission had the chain drive replaced with drive shafts. These were given the classification Köf 12 (class 333 after 1968). 250 of this type were made. From 333 102 onwards the external appearance changed due to the installation of an improved cooler.

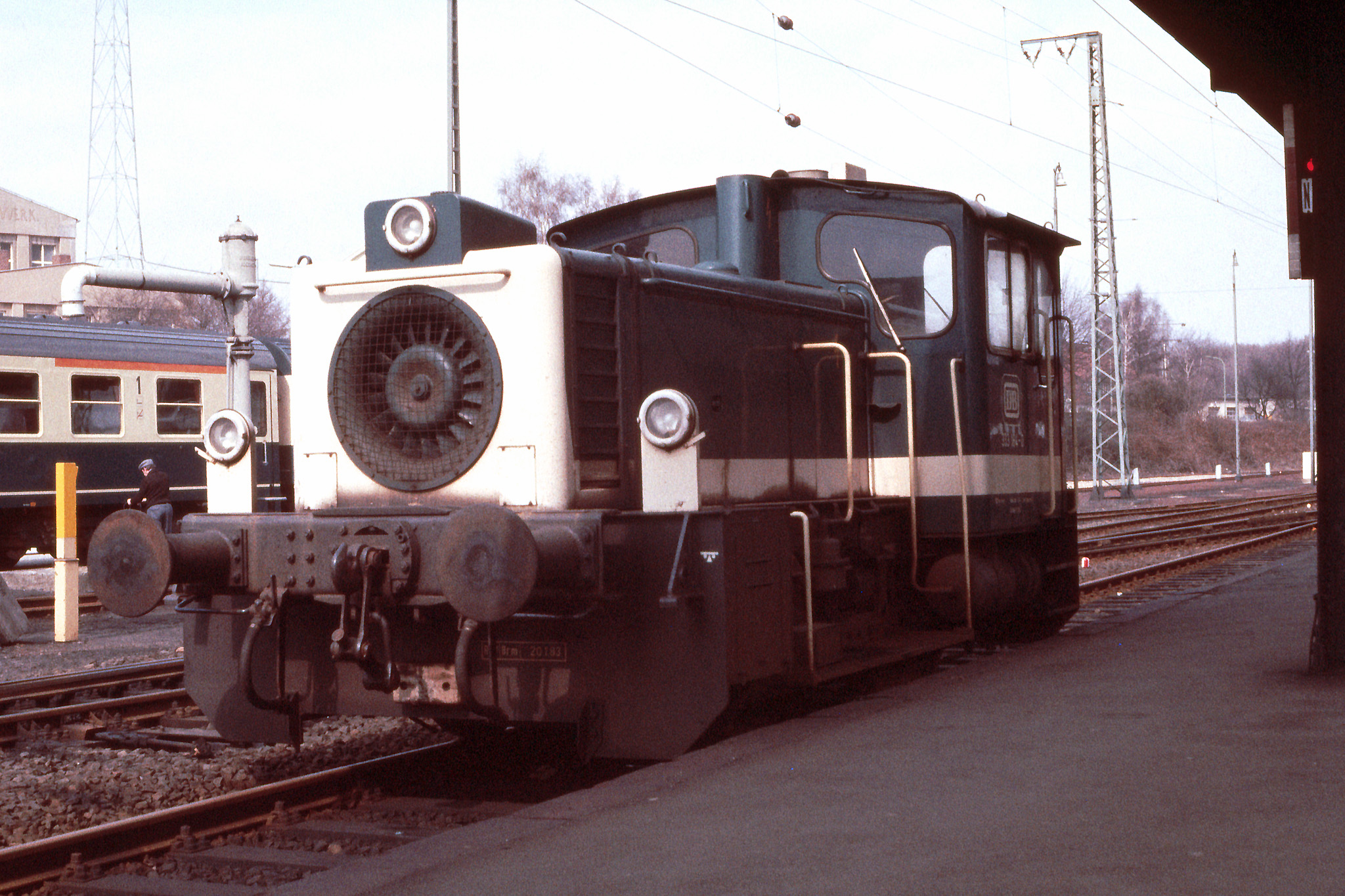
Köf 12 (class 333) in Turquoise and yellow DB livery

To further lower personnel expenditure cost of shunting services in 1984 the German Railways began experimenting with radio controls for shunting locomotives.

The reason for this is that previously shunting involved the work of two men: the small locomotive operator and a person who performed coupling tasks and monitored the shunting operations - the two communicating by radio. By giving one person remote control of the train the task could be performed by one person. The persons performing this were given the new job title Lokrangierführers in German.

The engines 333 108, 114 and 138 were the first of the class to be fitted with the remote control equipment and from 1988 the rebuilding of locomotives of the class 333 began which were given the class number 335. Locomotives of the class 332 were not upgraded and from the middle of the 1990s onwards were phased out.

Only classes 333 and 335 remain in service with the German Railways (Deutsche Bahn).

== Design ==
The drivers cabin rests on the outside frame and is removable; thus the overall clearance of the locomotive can be easily reduced for transportation on an open wagon to another place. This avoids these low speed locomotives holding up other traffic when they have to be transported.

The buffer beams are impact absorbing and are relatively simply replaced - for example in the case of them being damaged by over enthusiastic shunting operations.

A hydraulic reversing gear is situated between the final drive and hydraulic transmission system. In class 332 the hydraulic transmission consists of a clutch and hydrostatic drive, in the 333 of two torque converters

For braking the locomotives have a continuous air pressure brake of Knorr design, and in addition, a hand brake for the locomotive which works on the front wheel set.

Because the speed of operation of the air compressors which supply the air brake is dependent on the engine speed, one can frequently observe at train stations the locomotive's engines being run (in neutral) at full power to give more braking force.

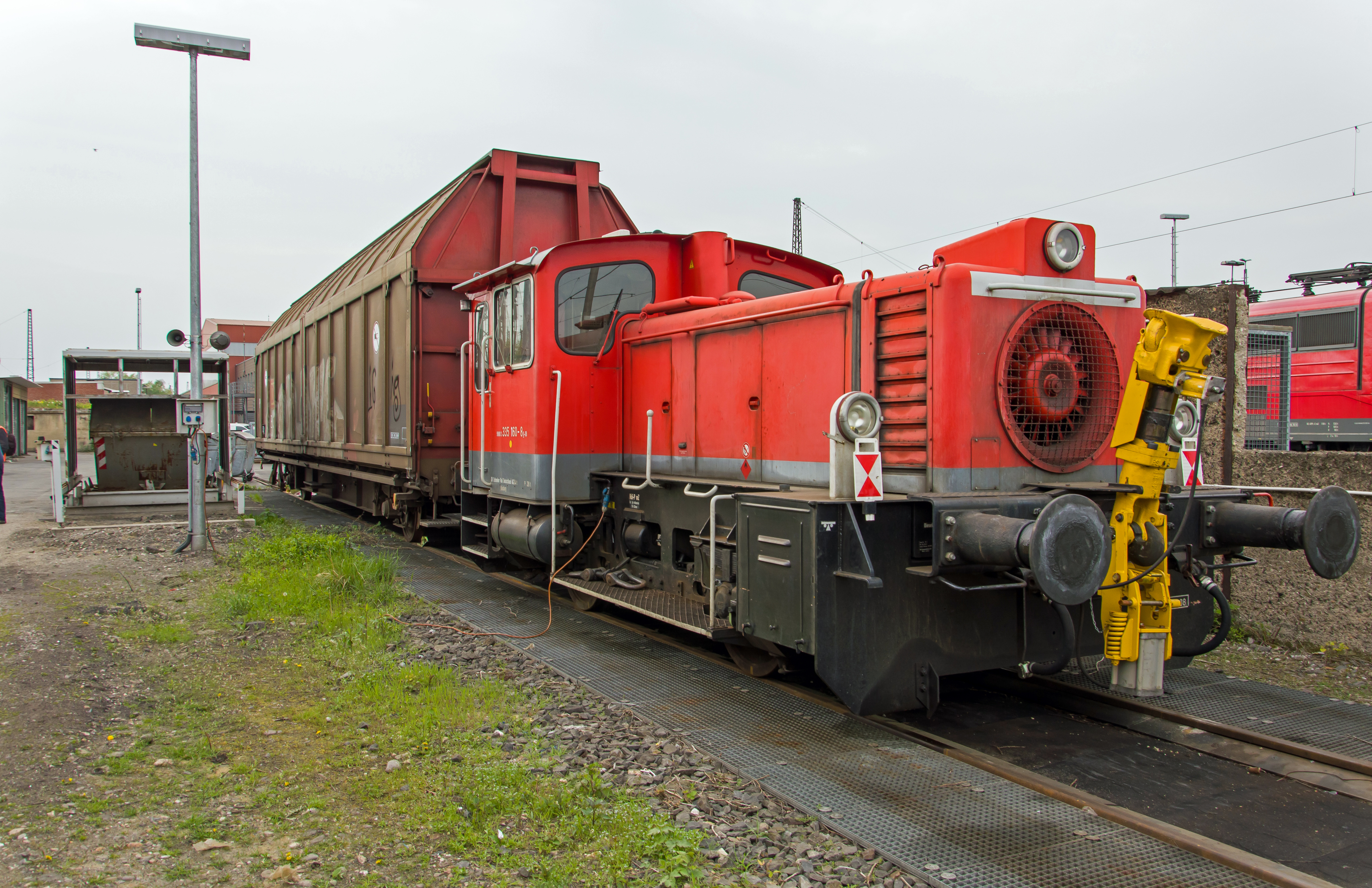
Class 335 The automatic coupling device is visible

Locomotives of class 335 differ from class 333 by having indicator lamps which indicate the status of the vehicle to a remote operator as well as an additional box for the remote control on the outside of the drivers cab rear wall

Class 335 also have an automatic shunting coupling of a claw type which can also be remoted drawn up out of the way for normal manual screw coupling to take place.

In 2001 due to reduced demand for radio controlled locomotives in 24 class 335 locomotives where converted back to class 333; the ordinal number was increased by 500 (thus 335 025 would become 333 525).

These small locomotives do not have the fully safety package that is mandatory on other German Railways locomotives. However the later members of the class 333 locos have some form of automatic train protection fitted.

== Variants ==
In short the different variants can be describe thus:

- Class 331 (Köf 10)
  - top speed 30 km/h - Chain drive
- Class 332 (Köf 11)
  - top speed 45 km/h - Chain drive
- Class 333 (Köf 12)
  - top speed 45 km/h - Shaft drive
- Class 335 (created post 1968 hence no Köf classification number)
  - top speed 45 km/h - Shaft drive - remote controlled

== See also ==
- Deutsche Reichsbahn
- List of DRG locomotives and railbuses
- Kleinlokomotive
- DRG Kleinlokomotive Class I
- DRG Kleinlokomotive Class II
