= Hesper Valley Railway =

Railway line in Germany

Coordinates: 51°22′42″N 7°2′18″E

The Hesper Valley Railway (German: Hespertalbahn) is a German heritage line running steam locomotive services between Kupferdreh Old Station and Haus Scheppen on the Baldeneysee lake in Essen.

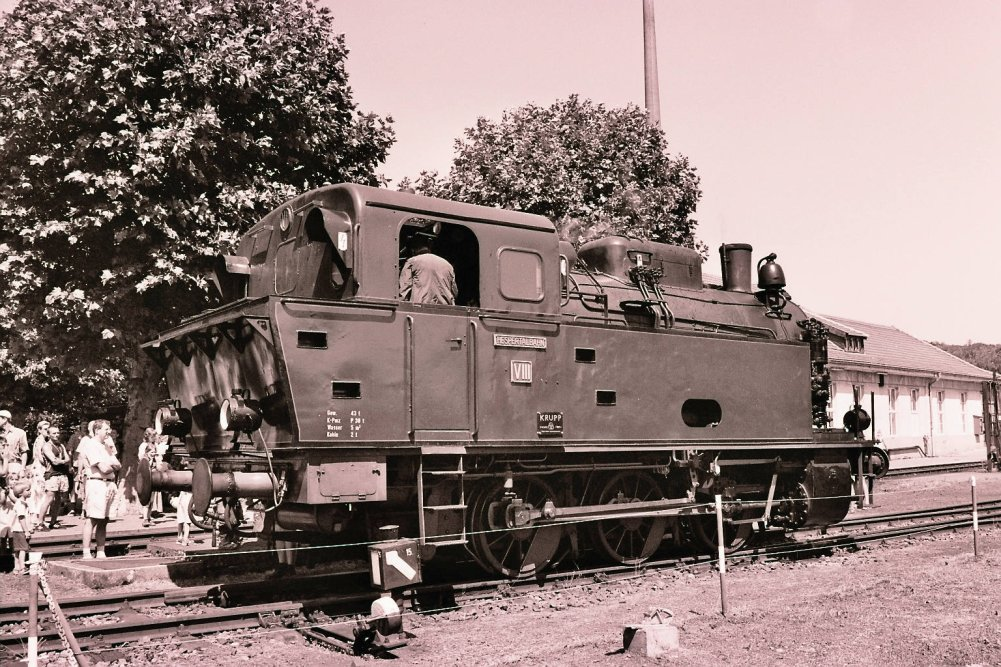
Steam locomotive on the Hespertalbahn

As a narrow gauge wagonway it linked opened up Erzgruben in 1867, and the Pörtingsiepen mine in 1877. The upgrading of part of the line to standard gauge followed in 1918. In 1973 the line was closed. In June 1975 the Hesper Valley Railway Preservation Society (Verein zur Erhaltung der Hespertalbahn) saved the route and has since operated it as a heritage railway. The top speed on the line is 15 km/h.

The Hesper Valley Railway is part of the Route der Industriekultur, route 12 (The Ruhr — past and present) and route 15 (Railways in the area).

== Photographs ==
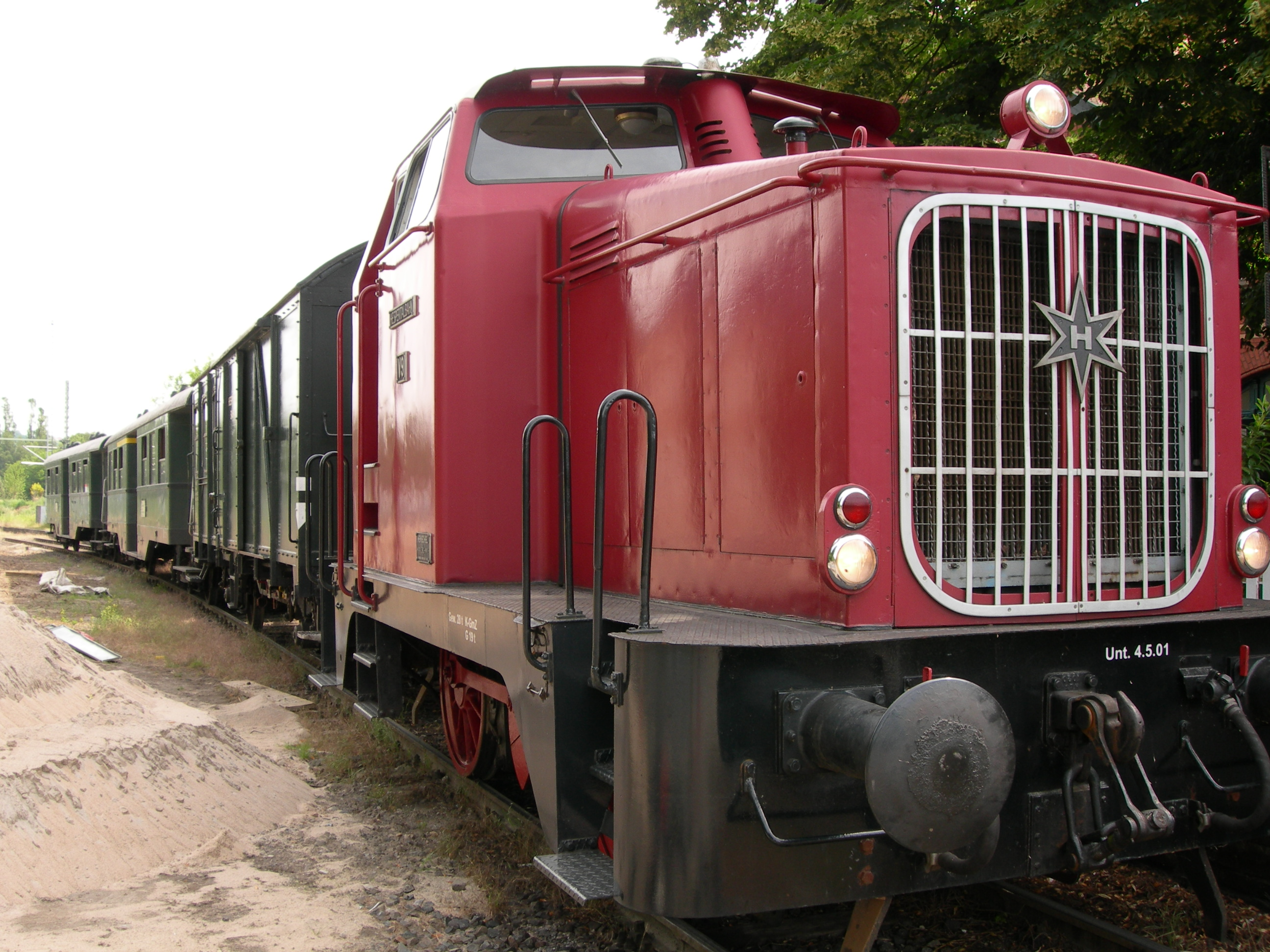
Hespertalbahn with diesel loco, 2006

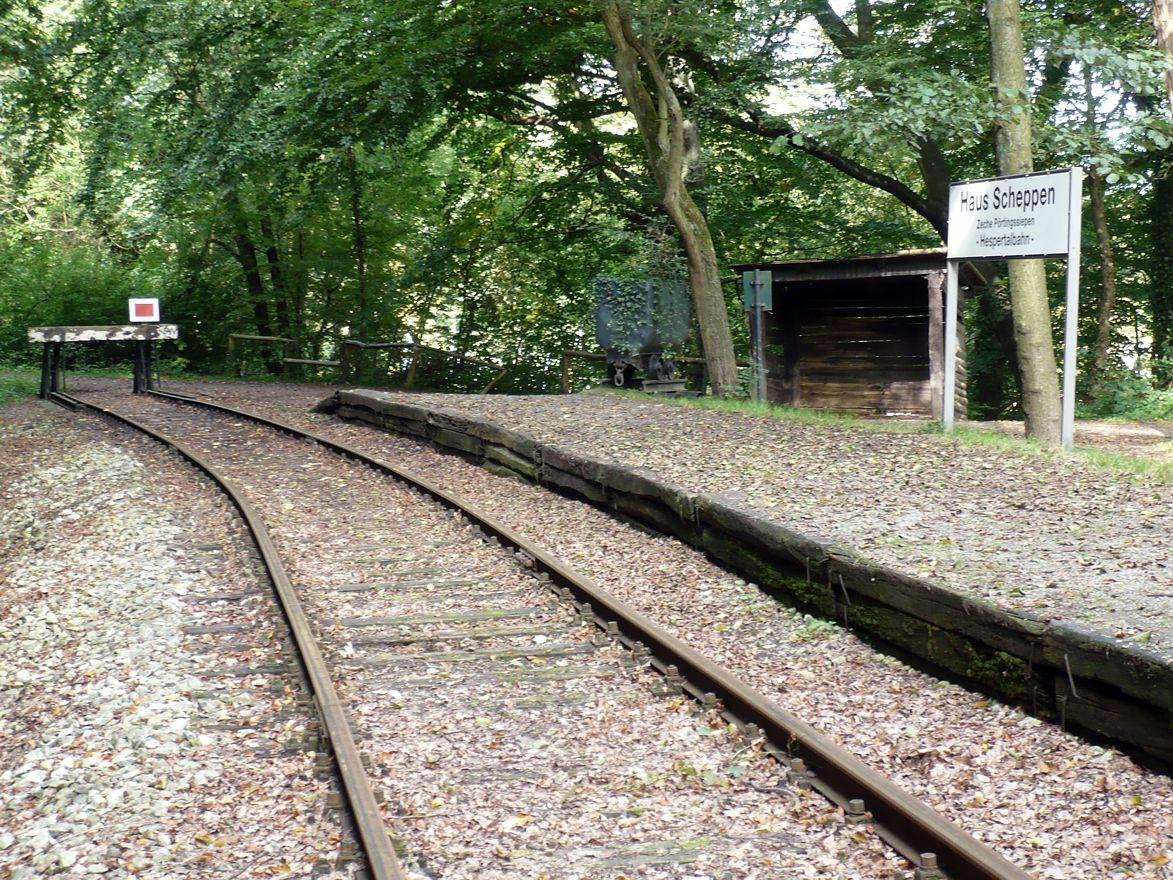
Haus Scheppen terminus, 2007

== Location ==
- Prinz-Friedrich-Straße 1, 45257 Essen-Kupferdeh

== Sources ==
- Leitsch, Joachim: Die Hespertalbahn. Eine Zechenbahn im Wandel der Zeiten. In: Der Anschnitt 1–2 (1995), S. 44–54
- Leitsch, Joachim: Kohle, Kalk und Erze. Die Geschichte der Hespertalbahn. Hrg.: Verein zur Erhaltung der Hespertalbahn e.V. Essen 1993.
- Leitsch, Joachim / Dirk, Hagedorn: Kohle, Kalk und Erze. Die Geschichte der Hespertalbahn. Hrg.: Hespertalbahn e.V. Essen 2008 (erweiterte Auflage)
