= DRG Kleinlokomotive Class II =

Class of German shunting locomotives

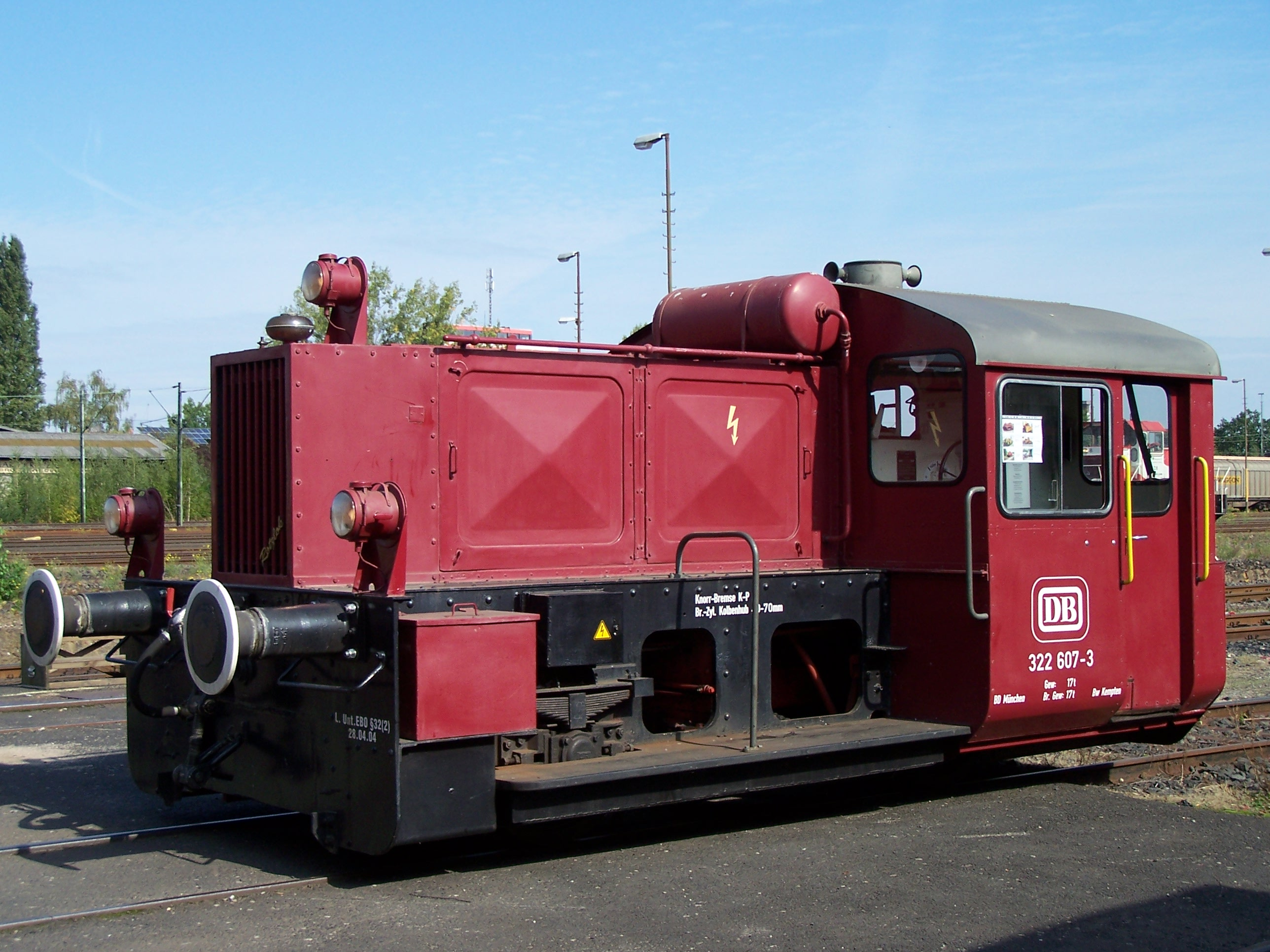
Köf II

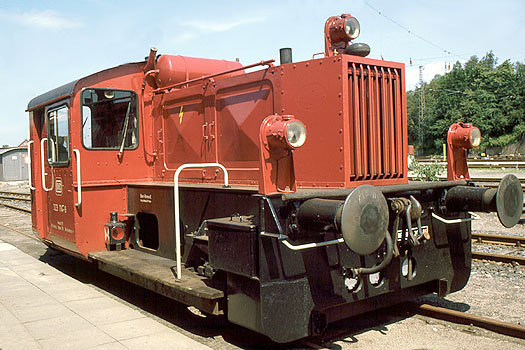
Köf II

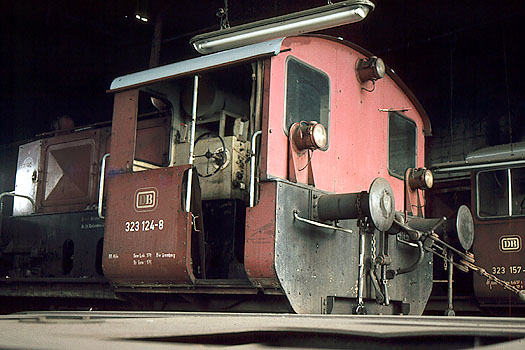
Köf II on a rail flat

German Kleinlokomotiven (literally: small locomotives) like the DRG Kö II (later: Köf II) were developed as locomotives with a low weight and driving power for light shunting duties. There were two classes, based on engine power. The Class II were engines which developed more than 40 (later 50) HP.

After tests with several trial locomotives, they were placed in service from 1932 onwards by the Deutsche Reichsbahn (DRG) and used on small stations for light shunting and marshalling work. They were intended to make the handling of goods traffic more economical. To do that, an appropriately trained controller had to be able to handle shunting duties using the locomotive. Accordingly, the locomotive was designed to be robust and easy to operate.

== Technology ==
Light locomotives mainly used diesel motors (originally classified as Kö/Köf/Köe by the DRG), as their source of energy, but there were also versions with Benzol motors, designated as Kb/Kbf/Kbe, and with electrical batteries (accumulator cars: Ks/Ka), as well as one locomotive with a steam engine. The third letter, if present, indicated the type of power transmission. If there was none, the locomotive had a mechanical gear system with a dry clutch. An f stood for a hydraulic drive and an e for electric traction motors, that were fed by a generator. Köf, therefore, stood for a light locomotive (Kleinlok) with diesel engine (Öl-(Diesel-)Motor) and hydraulic transmission (Flüssigkeitsgetriebe). Power is transmitted to the axles using a chain linkage.

The locomotive is very small and yet of 1,435 mm (4 ft 8 1/2 in), standard gauge, width, but only fills about half the loading gauge profile. As a result, it can be loaded onto flat wagons. This was how the locomotives were moved between yards or to depots for overhaul and repair. The top speed of 30 km/h (19 mph) made it impractical for the locomotives to power themselves over the mainline.

The light diesel locomotives were the first German diesel engines that were built in batches by several manufacturers. They were initially divided into two power groups:

- Class I (initially 40 hp or 30 kW, later 50 hp or 37 kW)
- Class II (up to 90 hp or 67 kW)

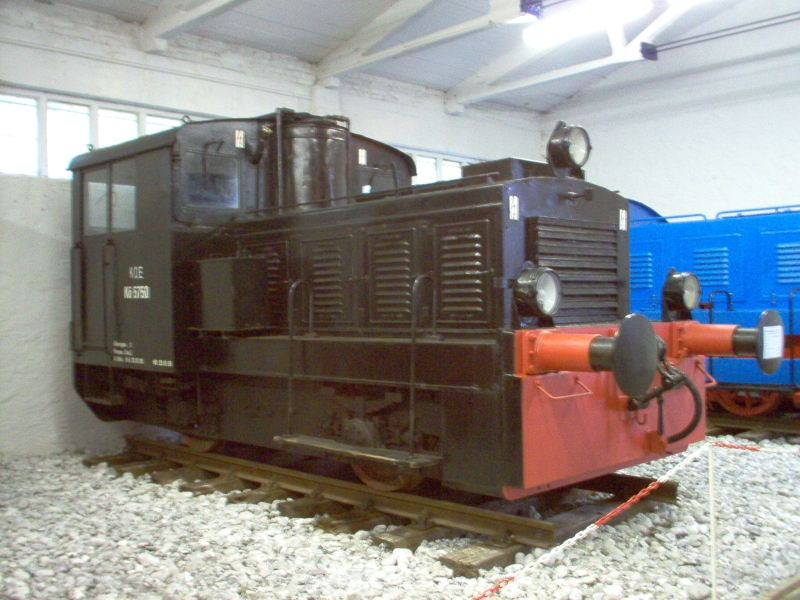
Kö5750 in the Eisenbahn & Technik Museum Rügen

DB had over 700 new Köf II engines newly built and further developed after the war. In the GDR, 32 Kö II were (re-)built in Dessau maintenance works for DR (among them the last ever built of 1968). More than 360 very similar vehicles were produced exclusively for industrial railways, series N3 with chain link drive and 60 PS (44 kW), referred to as N3 by the manufacturers, and series N4 with side rod drive and 90 hp (67 kW). The first proper development of small shunting locomotives in the GDR was the V 10 B, which was further developed into class V 15. A plan – similar to the one of DB – to build a series of more powerful Köf III was subsequently discarded and replaced by the DR class V 60 project.

The DB later developed a Köf III with up to 240 hp (180 kW). In 1987, the Class 260/261 (up to 1968 called V 60) engines were reclassified as light locomotives and renumbered into classes 360/361.

The brake effort of the Kö was initially only determined by the weight of the engine driver and the maximum force he could transmit via the brake pedal. With the introduction of new, more powerful motors (up to 128 hp or 95 kW) and the corresponding increase in tractive effort this proved insufficient; as a result many light locos in the DB and DR were equipped with a compressed-air brake, that could also operated the brakes of attached wagons. DR engines were not equipped with their own brake cylinders so that only the attached wagons were air-braked. In the DB the permitted top speed was raised from 30 to 45 km/h (19 to 28 mph) where compressed-air brakes had been installed. These locos can be easily recognised by their air reservoirs on the front. Because the open cab gave no real protection from the weather in winter, doors and windows were added during the course of main inspections from the late 1950s.

== Classifications ==
Deutsche Reichsbahn-Gesellschaft: power category (Leistungsgruppe) II, Kb/Kö/Köf/Kbf 4001 to 6047
Deutsche Bundesbahn: continued production of Köf II up to Köf 6835
Deutsche Bundesbahn: in 1968 redesignated as Class 321–324
Deutsche Reichsbahn (East Germany): new models Kö 4002 to 4032
Deutsche Reichsbahn (East Germany): in 1970 redesignated as Class 100
Deutsche Reichsbahn (East Germany): in 1973, narrow gauge Kö redesignated as Class 199
Deutsche Bahn AG: in 1992 DR Class 100 redesignated as DBAG Class 310

- Class 321: Vmax = 30 km/h, foot brake, rebuilt into 322-324 stopped in February 1974
- Class 322: Vmax = 30 km/h, compressed-air brake
- Class 323-324: Vmax = 45 km/h, compressed-air brake

== Preserved Locomotives ==
=== Deutsche Bundesbahn/Deutsche Bahn AG ===
In the 1980s numerous Köf IIs were still in service with the DB and DR (some over 50 years old. For a while, DB 323 412 and 323 415 were the oldest locomotives in the Deutsche Bundesbahn), as well as a handful of battery-operated light locos, of classes 381 and 382. Since 1999 no Köf IIs have worked for the Deutsche Bahn AG. However many remain working for other railway companies and societies, both in regular services and as museum locomotives.

=== East German Deutsche Reichsbahn ===
In 1970 the Deutsche Reichsbahn incorporated 378 machines of power category 2 in its EDP classification scheme as Class 100. After German reunification these became Class 310 in the DB AG. Only a few of the DR's light locomotives had hydraulic power transmission; they were grouped into sub-class 100.8. Under the old numbering scheme they were classified as Köf. Dead man's handles (Sifa) and radios for marshalling were not common. The Deutsche Reichsbahn converted many Kö to compressed-air brakes, this programme had not been completed when the Berlin Wall came down.

In 1983/84 three DR Kö II were converted to metre gauge working for the Halle industrial railway and the Harz Narrow Gauge Railway. They have been preserved.

== Gallery ==
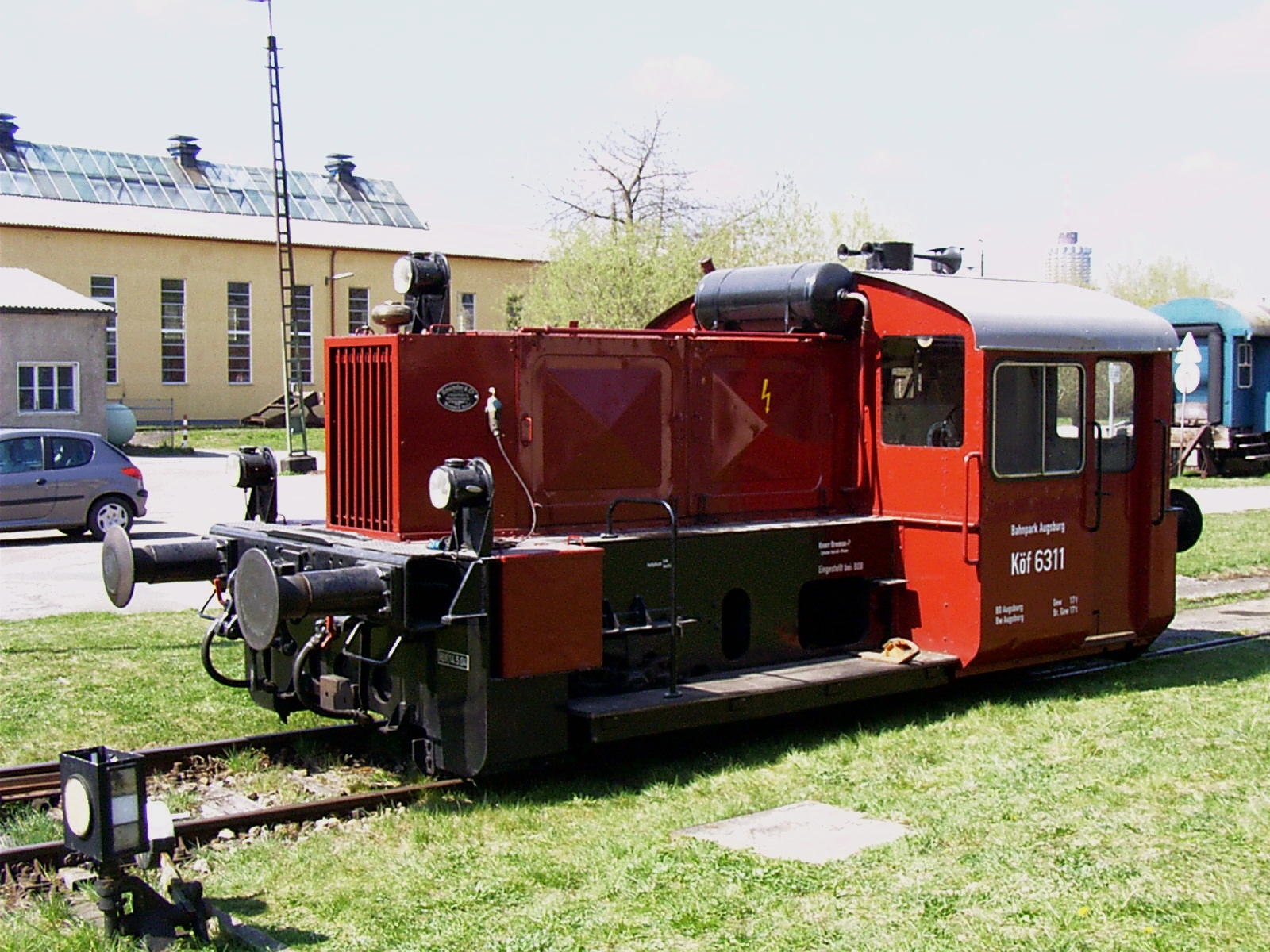
Operational Köf II in Augsburg Railway Park

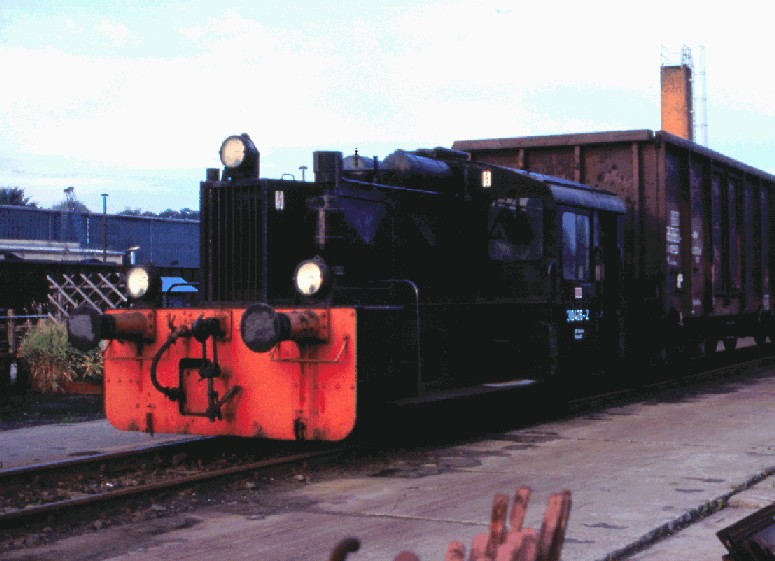
310 426 in Bad Salzungen

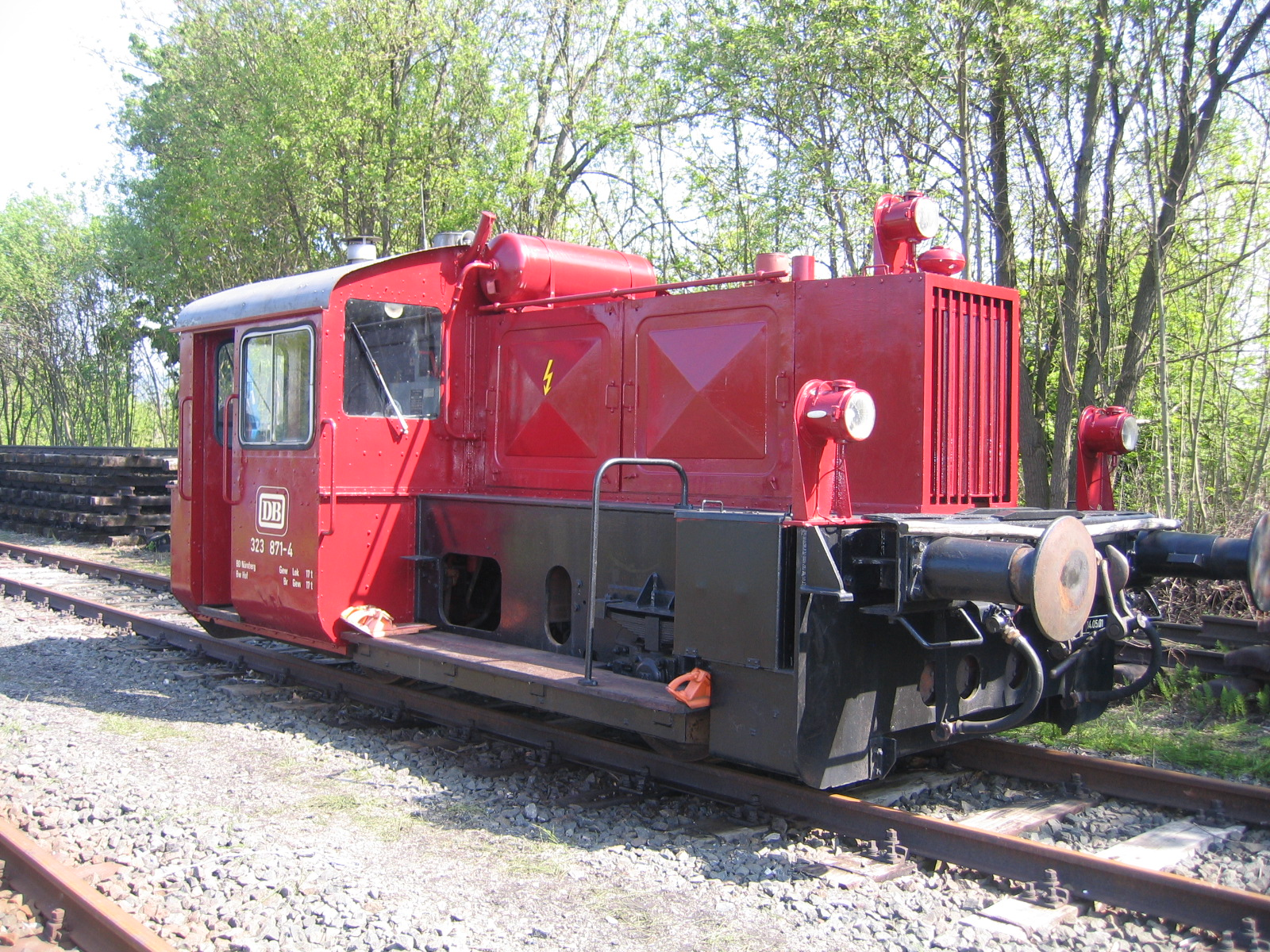
Köf II at the German Steam Locomotive Museum in Neuenmarkt

== See also ==
- Deutsche Reichsbahn
- List of DRG locomotives and railbuses
- Kleinlokomotive
- DRG Kleinlokomotive Class I
- DB Class Köf III

== Literature ==
- Große, Peter; Troche, Horst (2002). Die Einheitskleinlokomotiven Leistungsgruppen I und II (in German). EK-Verlag Freiburg. ISBN 3-88255-217-4.
