= Kleinlokomotive =

German locomotive

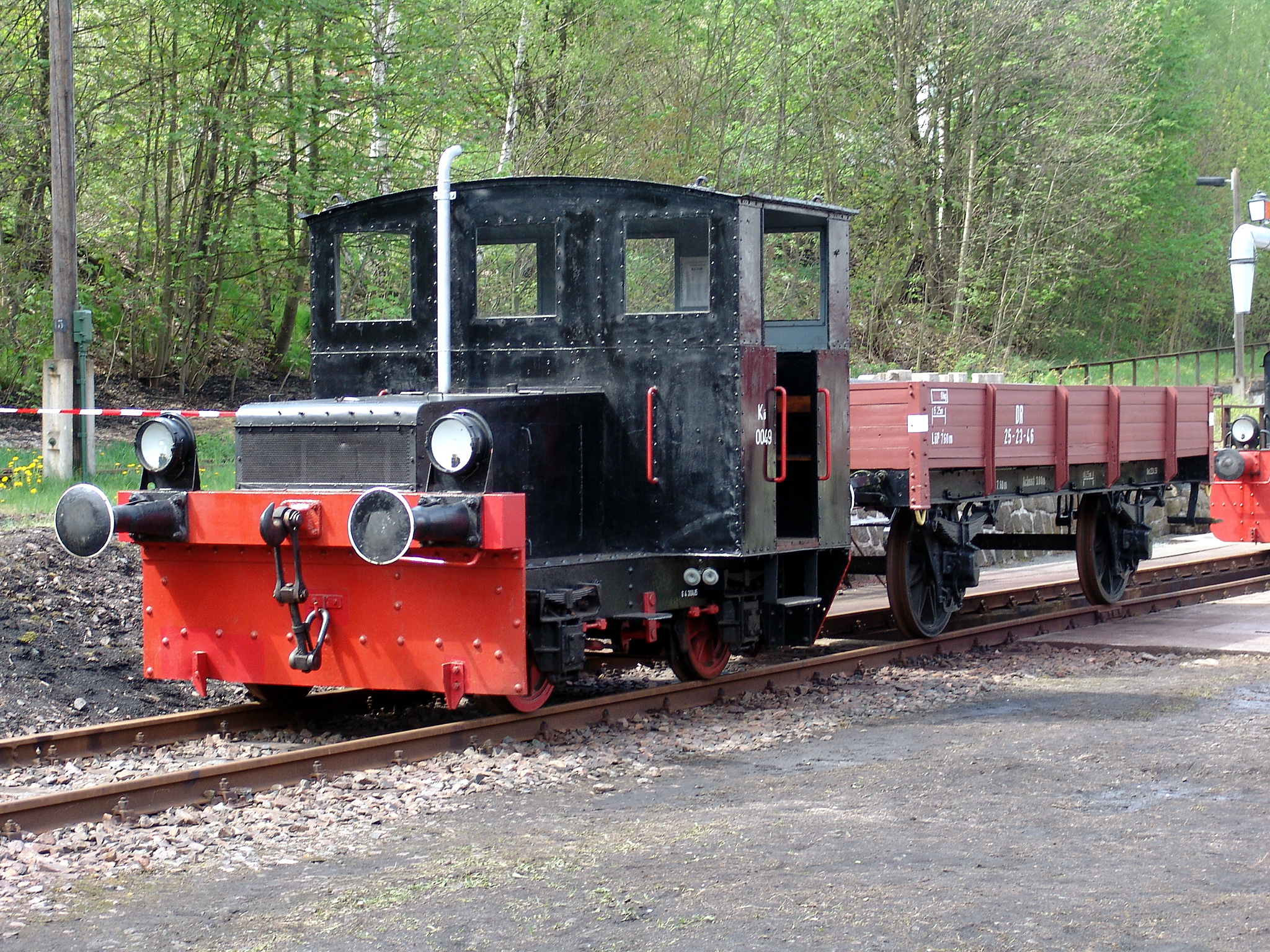
Kö I at Schwarzenberg Railway Museum

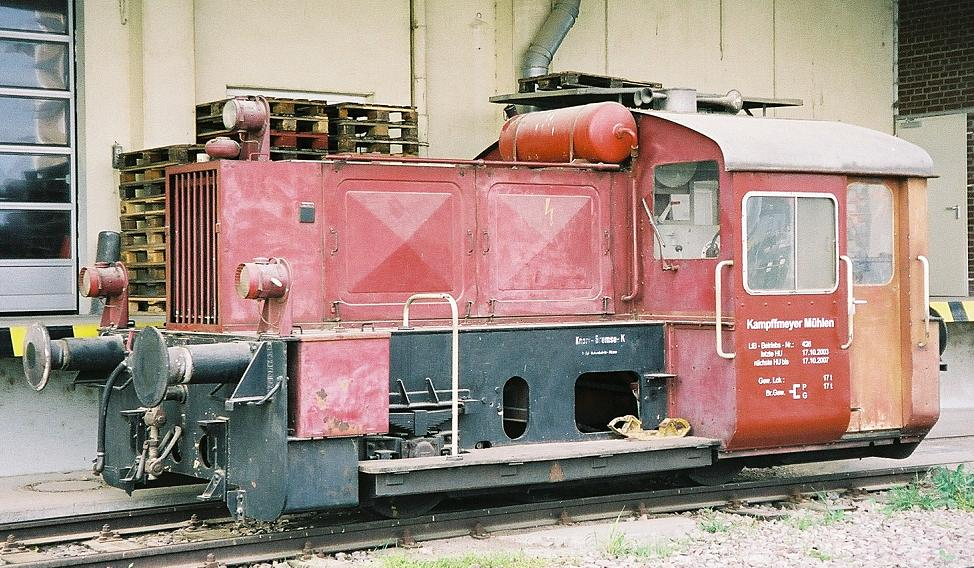
Köf II of Kampffmeyer Mühlen at Mannheim

A Kleinlokomotive or Kleinlok (literally: "small locomotive"; plural: Kleinlokomotiven or Kleinloks) is a German locomotive of small size and low power for light shunting duties at railway stations and on industrial railways. Most are powered by diesel engines, but Kleinloks with steam, petrol, or electric engines were also produced.

After testing several trials locomotives, the Deutsche Reichsbahn (DRG) placed various types of such locomotives into service from 1930 onwards. Industrial lines and railway workshops generally procured engines of the same design.

In Switzerland Kleinlokomotiven were used as light rail motor tractors.

== History ==
In order to speed up goods traffic and meet the challenges posed by emerging competition from road traffic, various national railways in Europe carried out trials with small diesel-powered shunters starting in 1923. Until then, all shunting movements for goods wagons at small stations and loading yards had to be carried out by the locomotive in charge of the local goods train (Nahgüterzug). This extended waiting times and reduced the average speed of the train considerably, but having a dedicated shunting engine at such stations would not have been economically viable due to the low levels of goods traffic. The development of combustion-engined locomotives offered new possibilities here: the Kleinlokomotiven were smaller, cheaper and easy to operate. It was anticipated that the resulting improvement in the speed at which goods could be moved would enable railways to compete with road transport.

The first trials - in 1923 by the French Eastern Railway, in 1925 by the Danish State Railway, in 1925 by the Dutch Railways, and in 1927 by the Reichsbahn - were very promising.

As a result, in 1930, the Deutsche Reichsbahn issued the first orders to various manufacturers for a total of 18 trials locomotives. A 1927 shunting unit delivered by the Berliner Maschinenbau AG to the Dutch State Railways served as a prototype. These vehicles were very different from one another, with varying performance. For its subsequent orders, in 1931 and 1932, the DRG specified the dimensions and divided the locomotives into two power categories – locomotives with an engine power output of up to 40 PS (29 kW) were allocated to power group I and more powerful locomotives to power group II. Based on its experience with the earlier engines, the Kleinlokomotiven were then standardised by the DRG as Einheitskleinlokomotive (standard small locomotives).

== Classification ==
=== DRG classification system ===
The first Kleinloks to be completed in 1930 were initially given the letter class V for Verbrennungsmotor (combustion engine) or A for Akkumulatorlokomotive (accumulator or battery-driven locomotive) followed by a serial number, beginning at 6000.

To make a better distinction between the various types of Kleinlokomotiven, the Deutsche Reichsbahn (DRG) introduced a new system in 1931, as part of which the concept of a Kleinlokomotive was first unequivocally laid down. Traction engines that only worked in railway workshops or at repair shops (Ausbesserungswerken) were not counted as Kleinlokomotiven.

The class letter K was now used to identify them. This was followed by a letter indicating the type of engine: b stood for petrol engine (Benzol, lit: "benzene"), d for steam engine (Dampfmaschine), ö for diesel engine (Öl, i.e. oil) and s for a battery-driven electric engine (Speicher, i.e. accumulator battery). The next letter indicated the type of transmission: e for electric power transmission (Elektrogetriebe) and f for hydraulic transmission (Flüssigkeitsgetriebe). Kleinlokomotiven with purely mechanical transmission were not given a specific third letter and those whose batteries were charged by a diesel or petrol engine were classified as Köe and Kbe respectively.

These letters were followed by a four-figure number, which indicated the power of the Kleinlok. Locomotives in power group (Leistungsgruppe) I were given numbers up to 3999; locomotives in power group II numbers from 4000 onwards. The numbers ran sequentially within each group.

In 1944, the letter g was introduced for locomotives powered by generator gas (Generatorgas).

Like the other DRG classification schemes, the classification for Kleinlokomotiven was retained by the Deutsche Bundesbahn (DB) and the Deutsche Reichsbahn after the Second World War.

In 1955, the Deutsche Bundesbahn raised the boundary between power groups I and II from 40 PS to 50 PS. In 1956, a new power group III was introduced for Kleinlokomotiven with an engine power output over 150 PS and they were allocated operating numbers from 10000 to 20000. In 1960, the Deutsche Bundesbahn changed the code letter s to a.

=== 1968 DB numbering scheme (West Germany) ===
Beginning on 1 January 1968, Kleinlokomotiven in the DB were placed into new classes in the 300 series. The second figure indicated the power class (based on the 1955 groups). The third digit varied depending on top speed and the type of brake or drive (chain drive or Gelenkwellenantrieb). Ka locomotives were allotted to classes 381 (pre-war types) and 382 (newer types). The existing narrow gauge Kleinlokomotiven on the Wangerooge Island Railway were grouped into Class 329.

In 1987, the DB Class 260/261 diesel locomotive (the pre-1968 Class V 60) was classed as a Kleinlokomotive so that it could be crewed by shunting staff who had not been trained to work locomotives on the open line. They were consequently reclassified as 360/361 engines.

=== 1970 DR numbering scheme (East Germany) ===
The DR's new numbering plan, introduced on 1 July 1970, placed all existing Kleinlokomotiven into Class 100, i.e. into the standard range of numbers for combustion-engined locomotives. Locomotives in power group I became sub-class 100.0 and locomotives in power group II went into sub-classes 100.1–100.9. The narrow gauge Kleinloks of both power groups were also grouped into sub-class 100.9 until 1972, but were then moved to Class 199.

Prior to 1970, however, newly built Kleinlokomotiven in the DR had not been given the class letter K, but were allocated, for example, to Class V 15 (later 101).

In the DB/DR common numbering scheme of 1992, the DR's Class 100 locomotives became Class 310.

== See also ==
- DRG Kleinlokomotive Class I
- DRG Kleinlokomotive Class II
- DB Class Köf III
- DB Class V 60
- DR Class V 60

== Sources ==
de:Kleinlokomotive
