= List of railway museums in Germany =

This list of railway museums in Germany shows those locations where a heritage railway or tramway is operated or a railway museum or streetcar museum exists. The name of the operating company is given where known.

== Germany ==
=== Baden-Württemberg ===
- Sinsheim Auto & Technik Museum, Sinsheim, Baden-Württemberg
- South German Railway Museum, Heilbronn, Baden-Württemberg

==== Baden ====
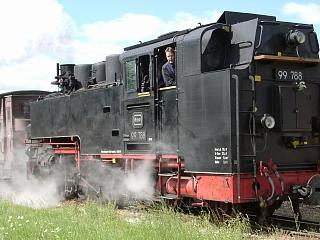
Öchsle locomotive

- 3 Seenbahn "3 Lakes Heritage Railway": Titisee–Seebrugg, IG 3-Seenbahn
- Achern–Ottenhöfen im Schwarzwald: Acher Valley Railway (Achertalbahn, Achertäler Bahnverein e. V.)
- Blumberg–Weizen: Wutach Valley Railway (Wutachtalbahn)
- Ettlingen–Bad Herrenalb: Alb Valley Railway (Albtalbahn, Ulmer Eisenbahnfreunde)
- Crailsheim: DBK Historic Railway
- Gaildorf–Sulzbach-Laufen Upper Kocher Valley Railway (Obere Kochertalbahn, DBK Historic Railway)
- Rebenbummler: Riegel am Kaiserstuhl–Breisach, Kaiserstuhl Railway
- Stuttgart: Railway Vehicle Preservation Society (Gesellschaft zur Erhaltung von Schienenfahrzeugen or GES)
- Haltingen–Kandern Kander Valley Railway (Kandertalbahn)
- Wiesloch Feldbahn and Industrial Museum
- Stuttgart Straßenbahn Museum Zuffenhausen

==== Württemberg ====
- Amstetten–Gerstetten railway (Lokalbahn Amstetten–Gerstetten, Ulmer Eisenbahnfreunde)
- Amstetten–Oppingen (Albbähnle), Ulmer Eisenbahnfreunde - Little Alb Railway
- Jagsttalbahn Möckmühl–Dörzbach - Jagst Valley Railway
- Schorndorf–Rudersberg (Wieslauftalbahn, in short: Wiesel) - Wieslauf Valley Railway
- Sigmaringen–Hechingen/–Münsingen
- Zollernbahn Railway Society, Rottweil, (Eisenbahnfreunde Zollernbahn)
- Nürtingen–Neuffen (Tälesbahn) - Täles Railway
- Warthausen–Ochsenhausen (Öchsle)
- Korntal–Weissach (Strohgäubahn) - Strohgäu Railway
- Trossinger Eisenbahn - Trossingen Railway
- Härtsfeld Museum Railway, Neresheim - Härtsfeld Railway
- Ulmer Eisenbahnfreunde, Ulm

=== Bavaria ===
==== Franconia ====
- Mellrichstadt–Fladungen (Rhön-Zügle) - Little Rhön Train
- Seligenstadt b. Wü.–Volkach (Mainschleifenbahn) - Mainschleifen Railway
- Ebermannstadt–Gößweinstein–Behringersmühle (Dampfbahn Fränkische Schweiz) - Franconian Switzerland Steam Railway
- DB Museum, Nuremberg
- Franconian Museum Railway, Nuremberg (Fränkische Museums-Eisenbahn)
- Neuenmarkt–Wirsberg (German Steam Locomotive Museum)
- Nuremberg Transport Museum, Nuremberg
- Steinwiesen–Nordhalben (Rodachtalbahn) - Rodach Valley Railway

==== Old Bavaria ====
- Bavarian Localbahn Society, Bayerisch Eisenstein
- Viechtach–Gotteszell
- Prien–Prien-Stock (Chiemsee-Bahn) - Chiemsee Railway
- Bad Endorf–Obing (Chiemgauer Lokalbahn) - Chiemsee Branch Line
- Kiefersfelden–Wachtl (Tirol) (Wachtl-Express) - Wachtl Express
- Eggmühl–Langquaid (Laabertalbahn) - Laaber Valley Railway
- Freilassing Locomotive World, Freilassing
- Deutsches Museum, Munich
- Munich Steam Locomotive Company, Munich

==== Swabia ====
- Augsburg Railway Park, Augsburg
- Bavarian Railway Museum, Nördlingen
- Nördlingen–Nördlingen–Feuchtwangen (Bavarian Railway Museum, Nördlingen)
- Nördlingen–Gunzenhausen (Bavarian Railway Museum, Nördlingen)
- (Augsburg–)Gessertshausen–Langenneufnach–Markt Wald (Staudenbahn) - Stauden Railway

=== Berlin ===
- German Museum of Technology (Berlin)
- Berlin-Rosenthal]–Basdorf–Schmachtenhagen (Heidekrautbahn) - Heidekraut Railway
- AG Märkische Kleinbahn in Schönow - Märkisch Railway
- Britzer Museumseisenbahn - Britz Museum Railway

=== Brandenburg ===
- Mesendorf–Brünkendorf–Vettin/–Lindenberg junction (Pollo)
- Finsterwalde Frankenaer Weg-Finsterwalde Ponnsdorfer Weg-Möllendorf-Breitenau-Kleinbahren-Crinitz Töpfermarkt-Crinitz station (Niederlausitzer Museumseisenbahn) - Niederlausitz Museum Railway
- Buckower Kleinbahn (Electric Kleinbahn (minor line) on the Buckow (Märkische Schweiz)–Waldsieversdorf–Müncheberg / Mark route) - Buckow Branch Line

=== Bremen ===
- 'Das Depot' museum and museum tram lines 15 and 16 (Freunde der Bremer Straßenbahn)
- Bremerhaven-Bad Bederkesa
- Bremen–Thedinghausen Railway

=== Hamburg ===
- Bergedorf–Geesthacht–Krümmel, Arbeitsgemeinschaft Geesthachter Eisenbahn - Geesthacht Railway Working Group

=== Hesse ===
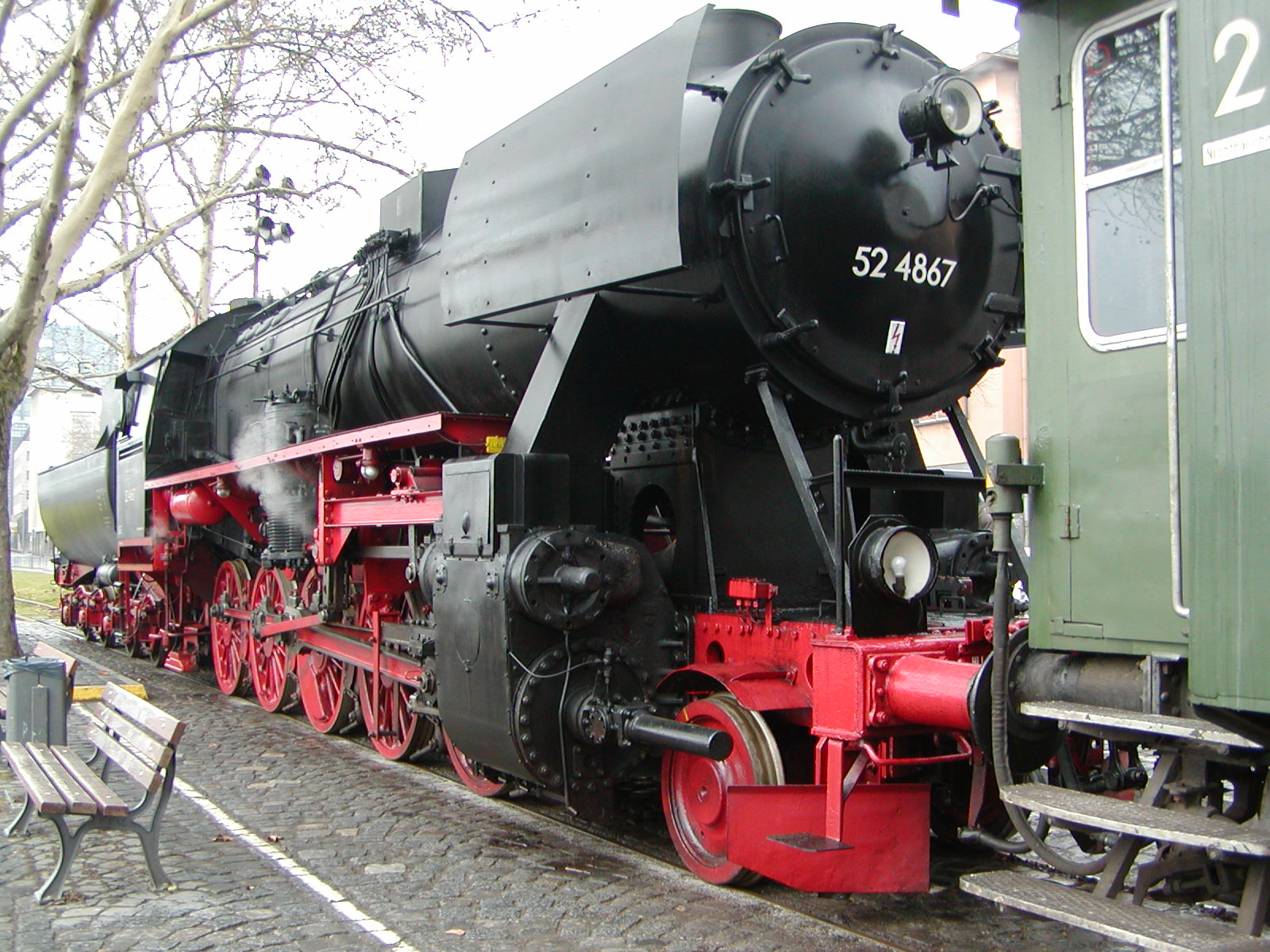
BR 52 locomotive of the Historic Railway, Frankfurt

- Schwalmstadt–Homberg/–Oberaula (Eisenbahnfreunde Schwalm-Knüll)
- Wiesbaden–Hohenstein (Aartalbahn or Nassau Tourist Railway)
- Bad Schwalbacher Kurbahn - Bad Schwalbach Spa Railway
- Bad Nauheim–Münzenberg (formerly Butzbach-Licher Eisenbahn, Eisenbahnfreunde Wetterau)
- Darmstadt-Kranichstein Railway Museum, Darmstadt
- Darmstadt Ost–Bessunger Forst
- Darmstadt–Roßdorf
- Darmstadt/Eberstadt–Alsbach
- Darmstadt/Schloss–Griesheim
- Frankfurt City Junction Line, Frankfurt
- Frankfurt port railway (Historic Railway, Frankfurt)
- Frankfurter Feldbahnmuseum - Frankfurt Feldbahn Museum
- Feld- und Grubenbahnmuseum Fortuna - Fortuna Feldbahn and Mining Railway Museum
- Historic Railway, Frankfurt, Frankfurt
- Kassel–Naumburg (Hessencourrier)
- Dampfkleinbahn Bad Orb - Bad Orb Branch Line

=== Mecklenburg-West Pomerania ===
- Grevesmühlen–Klütz
- Schwichtenberg–Uhlenhorst (Mecklenburg-Pommersche Schmalspurbahn) - Mecklenburg-Pomeranian Narrow Gauge Railway
- Neubrandenburg–Friedland

=== Lower Saxony ===
==== West of the Weser ====
- Spiekeroog (Museum wagonway) - Spiekerooge Island Railway
- Borkum Reede–Borkum (Borkumer Kleinbahn, Museum open in summer) - Borkum Branch Line
- Norden–Dornum (Museumseisenbahn Küstenbahn Ostfriesland) - Ostfriesland Coastal Railway
- Meppen–Haselünne–Herzlake–Löningen, Meppen-Haselünner Eisenbahn (Eisenbahnfreunde Hasetal) Meppen-Haselünne Railway
- Westerstede–Sedelsberg (Museumseisenbahn Ammerland-Saterland) - Ammerland-Saterland Museum Railway
- Delmenhorst–Harpstedt ("Jan Harpstedt", Delmenhorst-Harpstedter Eisenbahnfreunde)
- Friesoythe–Garrel–Cloppenburg
- Bremen-Thedinghausen Railway (Kleinbahn Leeste) - Leeste Branch Line
- Deutscher Eisenbahn-Verein (German Railway Society), Bruchhausen-Vilsen–Asendorf (first and oldest museum railway in Germany, 1964), Kaffkieker
- Osnabrück-Piesberg Mine station (Osnabrücker Dampflokfreunde)
- Preußisch-Oldendorf–Bohmte (Wittlager Kreisbahn, Minden Museum Railway) - Wittlage District Railway

==== East of the Weser ====
- Moorbahn Burgsittensen - Burgsittensen Moor Railway
- Deinste–Lütjenkamp (b. Stade)
- Tostedt–Zeven–Wilstedt
- Bad Bederkesa–Bremerhaven
- Bremervörde–Gnarrenburg–Worpswede–Osterholz-Scharmbeck (Moorexpress) - Moor Express
- Buxtehude–Harsefeld
- Verden (Aller)–Kirchlinteln-Stemmen: Verdener Eisenbahnfreunde Kleinbahn Verden-Walsrode - Verden-Walsrode Railway
- Soltau–Bispingen–Winsen (Luhe)/–Lüneburg–Bleckede (Heide Express)
- Soltau–Bergen–Celle/–Munster (including Heide Express)
- Celle–Wittingen (including Heide Express)

==== Eastphalia (Southeast Lower Saxony) ====
- Sehnde, Hanover, (Hannoversches Straßenbahn-Museum) - Hanover Tramway Museum
- Uchte–Rahden
- Stadthagen–Bad Eilsen–Rinteln (Dampfeisenbahn Weserbergland) - Weser Uplands Steam Railway
- Rinteln–Barntrup
- Helmstedt–Weferlingen (Ostfalenkurier)
- Duingen–Bad Salzdetfurth–Bodenburg
- Salzgitter–Börßum
- Emmerthal–Bodenwerder–Vorwohle
- Kreiensen–Kalefeld
- Wunstorf–Bokeloh–Mesmerode (Steinhuder Meer-Bahn) - Steinhude Lake Railway
- Almstedt–Segeste (Arbeitsgemeinschaft historische Eisenbahn) - Historic Railway Working Group

=== Mecklenburg-Western Pomerania ===
- Rügen Railway & Technology Museum, Prora

=== North Rhine-Westphalia ===
==== Westphalia ====
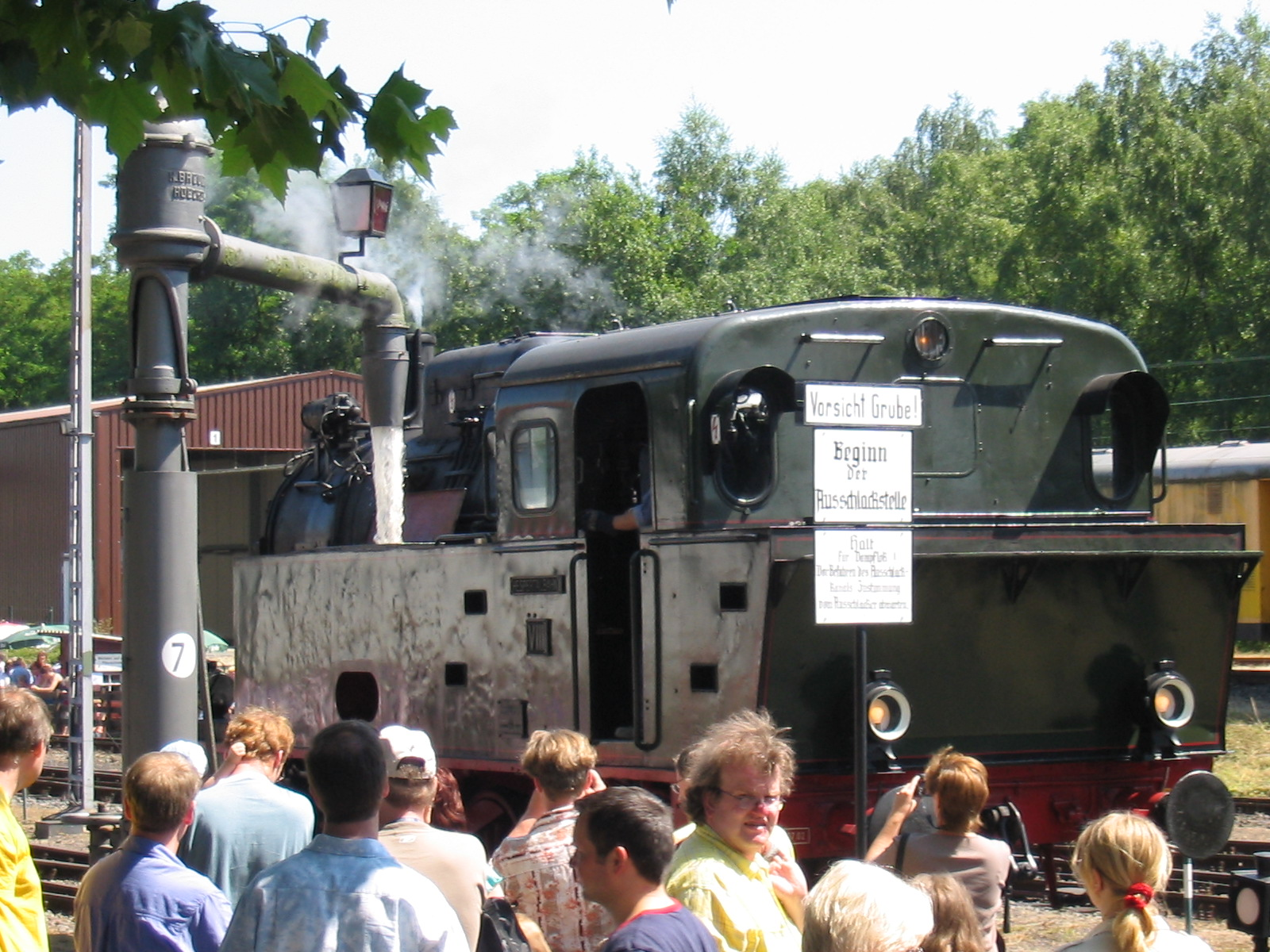
Hespertalbahn

- Osnabrück–Mettingen-Rheine (Tecklenburger Nordbahn, Osnadampf) - Tecklenburg Northern Railway
- Bocholt–Mussum (Euregio Eisenbahn Ahaus-Alstätte)
- Bochum Dahlhausen Railway Museum, Bochum
- Bochum-Dahlhausen–Hagen Hauptbahnhof–Ennepetal-Altenvoerde (Bochum-Dahlhausen Railway Museum, Ruhrtal-Bahn) - Ruhr Valley Railway
- Witten (Gruben- und Feldbahnmuseum Theresia) - Theresia Feldbahn and Mining Railway Museum
- Hamm–Lippborg (Museumseisenbahn Hamm) - Hamm Museum Railway
- Rheda-Wiedenbrück–Langenberg (Operations planned) (Westfälische Localbahn) - Westphalian Branchl Line
- Hövelhof–Gütersloh Nord–Ibbenbüren
- Gütersloh, Dampf-Kleinbahn Mühlenstroth
- Halle (Westfalen)-Bielefeld ("Haller Willem")
- Hille–Minden–Kleinenbremen (Mindener Museumseisenbahn)
- Rahden–Uchte (Mindener Museumseisenbahn)
- Barntrup–Rinteln Süd (Lippische Landeseisenbahn) - Lippe State Railway
- Büren (Westfalen)–Brilon (Waldbahn Almetal)
- Herscheid-Hüinghausen–Plettenberg-Köbbinghauser Hammer (Sauerländer Kleinbahn) - Sauerland Branch Line
- Coesfeld-Lette (Technisches Eisenbahnmuseum Alter Bahnhof Lette (Kr Coesfeld))
- Erkrath (Eisenbahnmuseum Lokschuppen Hochdahl) - Lokschuppen Hochdahl Railway Museum
- Metelen (Eisenbahnmuseum Metelen Land) - Metelen State Railway Museum
- Münster (Westfälisches Eisenbahnmuseum Münster) - Westphalian Railway Museum, Münster

==== Rhineland ====
- Dieringhausen Railway Museum, Dieringhausen, Gummersbach (Eisenbahnmuseum Dieringhausen)
- Geilenkirchen–Gillrath–Schierwaldenrath–Gangelt (Interessengemeinschaft Historischer Schienenverkehr, Selfkantbahn) - Selfkant Railway
- Moers–Neukirchen-Vluyn–Rheurdt (Closed 2001, from 2007 occasional excursions in the Moers–Neukirchen-Vluyn area by the Niederrheinische Verkehrsbetriebe)
- Moers-Orsoy]-Rheinberg (Niederrheinische Verkehrsbetriebe)
- Tönisvorst–Krefeld–Hülser Berg (Schluff, Stadtwerke Krefeld)
- Essen-Kupferdreh–Essen-Werden (Hespertalbahn) - Hespe Valley Railway
- Wuppertal–Bergisches Straßenbahnmuseum (Bergische Museumsbahn) - Bergisch Museum Railway
- Köln-Dellbrück (Straßenbahnmuseum Köln-Thielenbruch) - Cologne-Thielenbruch Tramway Museum
- Köln-Nippes (Rheinisches Industriebahn-Museum (RIM)) - Rhine Industrial Museum
- Wesseling (Eisenbahn-Museum der Köln-Bonner Eisenbahn-Freunde) - Railway Museum of the Cologne-Bonn Railway Society
- Siegen (Südwestfälisches Eisenbahnmuseum Siegen) - South Westphalian Railway Museum
- Kall–Schleiden (Oleftalbahn) - Olef Valley Railway

=== Rhineland-Palatinate ===
- Betzdorf–Steinebach/Sieg
- Hermeskeil–Nonnweiler
- Bahnbetriebswerk Hermeskeil, Hermeskeil
- Neustadt/Weinstraße Railway Museum, Neustadt an der Weinstrasse
- Neustadt an der Weinstraße–Elmstein (Kuckucksbähnel) - Cuckoo Railway
- Gerolstein–Kaisersesch (Eifelquerbahn) - Pan-Eifel Railway
- Kasbachtalbahn (Linz/Rhein−Kalenborn) - Kasbach Valley Railway
- Brohltalbahn - Brohl Valley Railway
- Technik Museum Speyer, Speyer

=== Saarland ===
- Merzig–Nunkirchen–Losheim (Merzig-Büschfelder Eisenbahn operated by Museums-Eisenbahnclub-Losheim) - Merzig-Büschfeld Railway
- Ottweiler–Schwarzerden bei Freisen (Ostertalbahn) - Oster Valley Railway

=== Saxony ===
- Dresden Transport Museum, Dresden
- Weißwasser–Bad Muskau (Waldeisenbahn Muskau) 600 mm (1 ft 11 5/8 in) gauge - Muskau Forest Railway
- Freital–Kurort Kipsdorf (Weißeritztalbahn) 750 mm (2 ft 5 1/2 in) gauge - Weisseritz Valley Railway
- Zittau–Oybin/Jonsdorf (Zittauer Schmalspurbahnen) 750 mm (2 ft 5 1/2 in) gauge - Zittau Narrow Gauge Railways
- Cranzahl–Oberwiesenthal (Fichtelbergbahn) 750 mm gauge - Fichtelberg Railway
- Steinbach–Jöhstadt (Preßnitztalbahn) 750 mm gauge - Pressnitz Valley Railway
- Oschatz–Mügeln–Kemmlitz ("Wild Robert" Döllnitzbahn) 750 mm gauge - Döllnitz Railway
- Radebeul–Moritzburg–Radeburg (Lößnitzgrundbahn) 750 mm gauge Lössnitz Valley Railway
- Freital (de:Windbergbahn) 1,435 mm (4 ft 8 1/2 in) gauge (standard gauge) - Windberg Railway
- Schönheide–Stützengrün (Museumsbahn Schönheide) 750 mm (2 ft 5 1/2 in) gauge - Schönheide Museum Railway
- Saxon Railway Museum, Chemnitz
- Museumsfeldbahn Leipzig-Lindenau e.V. - Leipzig
- Eisenbahnmuseum Leipzig - Leipzig

=== Saxony-Anhalt ===
- Möckern–Altengrabow
- Wernigerode–Drei-Annen-Hohne–Nordhausen/–Brocken (Harzquerbahn/Brockenbahn) - Pan-Harz Railway and Brocken Railway
- Quedlinburg-Gernrode–Alexisbad–Stiege–Hasselfelde/–Eisfelder Talmühle und Alexisbad–Harzgerode (Selketalbahn) - Selke Valley Railway
- Hettstedt–Klostermansfeld (Mansfelder Bergwerksbahn) - Mansfeld Mining Railway
- Dessau–Wörlitz (Dessau-Wörlitzer Eisenbahn) - Dessau-Wörlitz Railway
- Traditionsbetriebswerk Staßfurt, Stassfurt

=== Schleswig-Holstein ===
- Kappeln–Süderbrarup (Angeln-Bahn) - Angeln Railway
- Kiel–Schönberg (Holstein) (Verein Verkehrsamateure und Museumsbahn) - Kiel–Schönberg Railway
- Schönberg (Holstein)–Schönberger Strand (Verein Verkehrsamateure und Museumsbahn)
- Bergedorf–Geesthacht–Krümmel
- Malente-Gremsmühlen–Lütjenburg railway

=== Thuringia ===
- Ilmenau–Schleusingen (Rennsteigbahn) - Rennsteig Railway
- Oberweißbacher Bergbahn - Oberweissbach Mountain Railway

== See also ==
- List of railway museums
- Narrow gauge railway
- Feldbahn
- History of rail transport in Germany
