= Hans Georg Hofmann =

German general and politician (1873–1942)

State Secretary to the Reichsstatthalter of Bavaria
- In office 5 July 1934 – 31 January 1942
- Preceded by: Position created
- Succeeded by: Franz Eduard Schachinger
- Reichsstatthalter: Franz Ritter von Epp

District President Middle Franconia and Upper Franconia
- In office 4 April 1933 – 8 May 1934
- Preceded by: Gustav Rohmer
- Succeeded by: Hans Dippold

Additional positions
- 1932–1942: Reichstag Deputy
- 1934–1939: People's Court Judge

Personal details
- Born: 26 September 1873 Hof, Kingdom of Bavaria, German Empire
- Died: 31 January 1942 (aged 68) Munich, Bavaria, Nazi Germany
- Cause of death: Heart attack
- Party: Nazi Party
- Profession: Military officer
- Civilian awards: Blood Order; Golden Party Badge

Military service
- Allegiance: German Empire; Weimar Republic
- Branch/service: Royal Bavarian Army; Freikorps; Reichswehr
- Years of service: 1893–1926
- Rank: Oberst
- Unit: 16th Bavarian Infantry Regiment; 13th Bavarian Infantry Regiment; Freikorps Epp; 20th Reichswehr Infantry Regiment
- Commands: 28th Bavarian Infantry Regiment; Ingolstadt Fortress
- Battles/wars: World War I Bavarian Soviet Republic
- Military awards: Iron Cross, 1st & 2nd class Military Merit Order 4th class with crown and swords Military Merit Cross, 3rd class

Hans Georg Hofmann (26 September 1873 – 31 January 1942) was a German military officer under the German Empire and the Weimar Republic. He joined the Nazi Party paramilitary organization, the Sturmabteilung (SA), and rose to become an SA-Obergruppenführer in Nazi Germany. He was also a Nazi politician, serving in the Reichstag and as a Regierungspräsident (District President) and State Secretary in the state government of Bavaria. He died during the Second World War and a post-war denazification tribunal posthumously classified him as an "offender".

== Early life and military career ==
Hofmann was born in Hof, the son of a businessman. He attended Catholic Volksschule in Hof and in Steinwiesen, and then a humanistic Gymnasium in Bamberg, receiving his Abitur in 1893. On 1 August of that year, he joined the Royal Bavarian Army as a three-year volunteer with the 16th Infantry Regiment in Passau. From March 1894 to the end of January 1895, Hofmann attended the Bavarian Military Academy in Munich, and was subsequently promoted to Leutnant in March 1895. From October 1900 he was assigned as the adjutant to the district command in Vilshofen an der Donau for three years. He returned to the 16th Infantry Regiment until August 1907, being promoted to Oberleutnant on 6 March 1905. On 20 August 1907, he was transferred to the 13th Infantry Regiment in Ingolstadt, where he was promoted to Hauptmann on 7 March 1910. He then was assigned as a company commander on 25 May 1911.

After the outbreak of the First World War, Hofmann served in the front lines on the western front. In December 1914 he fell ill and spent the next few months in the hospital. After his recovery, Hofmann served as a battalion commander with the 10th, 21st, 13th and 28th infantry regiments, attaining the rank of Major on 17 January 1917. In early 1918, he advanced to deputy commander, and then commander, of the 28th Infantry Regiment. Hofmann became a British prisoner of war during the fighting near Ypres on 26 September 1918. He remained in British captivity until the end of the war and was repatriated to Germany. For his wartime service, he was awarded both classes of the Iron Cross, the Military Merit Order, 4th class with crown and swords, and the Military Merit Cross.

Hofmann returned to the 13th Infantry Regiment in Ingolstadt and served as a battalion commander in the Freikorps unit commanded by his fellow-Bavarian, Oberst Franz Ritter von Epp. After the suppression of the Bavarian Soviet Republic in May 1919, Hofmann served on the military tribunal that condemned to death Eugen Leviné, one of the leaders of the ousted regime. Hofmann also participated in suppressing a Communist uprising in Hamburg between June and August 1919. In 1920, he was accepted into the Reichswehr as a battalion commander of Infantry Regiment 20 in Passau, and was promoted to Oberstleutnant on 1 April 1922. On 1 April 1923, he was appointed the commandant of Ingolstadt Fortress. On 31 January 1926, Hofmann was retired from active military service with the rank of Oberst. He then worked as a civilian employee in the Reichswehr until 31 May 1931.

== Career in Nazi Germany ==
Hofmann first met Adolf Hitler in February 1920. Soon after, Hofmann became the leader of Bund Bayern und Reich in Lower Bavaria. This was the largest right-wing paramilitary organization in Bavaria at the time. It was monarchical, antisemitic and anti-Communist. In January 1923, Hofmann switched to the Bund Vaterland (Fatherland League), another paramilitary organization. During Hitler's failed Beer Hall Putsch in Munich on 9 November 1923, Hofmann acted as an intermediary between the putschists and the Reichswehr. In recognition of this, he later would be awarded the Blood Order on 20 April 1939.

=== Officer in the SA ===
Hofmann entered the Sturmabteilung (SA) on 31 May 1931. At the end of July 1931, he took over as Führer of the SA-Gruppe Bayern with the rank of SA-Gruppenführer. On 14 November 1931, he transferred to the command of SA-Gruppe Mittelland. From July to September 1932, Hofmann was given a staff assignment in the Supreme SA Leadership (OSAF) as SA-Inspekteur Süd, overseeing all SA units in Bavaria, Thuringia and Austria. Between September 1932 and March 1933, he again took up a major field command as the Führer of the newly established SA-Obergruppe IV, which included all the SA units in Bavaria: SA-Gruppen Bayerische Ostmark, Franken and Hochland. On 1 April 1933, Hofmann was promoted to the recently created rank of SA-Obergruppenführer. In April, he returned to the OSAF staff and served as the SA-Inspekteur Südost from 1 February to 30 June 1934. From July 1934 to his death, Hofmann remained on the OSAF staff but held no further commands. In 1934, Hofmann edited a brochure dubbed the SA-Katechismus (SA Catechism) that explicitly stated the Nazi movement was pledged to protect the two main Christian sects, Protestants and Catholics.

=== Political activity ===
In addition to his SA positions, Hofmann also was active in politics and government administration. He formally joined the Nazi Party Ortsgruppe (local group) in Ingolstadt on 1 June (membership number 550,075). As an early member, he later would be awarded the Golden Party Badge. At the July 1932 parliamentary election, he obtained a seat as a Nazi Party deputy in the Reichstag from electoral constituency 25 (Lower Bavaria–Upper Palatinate). He would retain this seat until his death in 1942. After the Nazi seizure of power, Hofmann was briefly assigned as the acting Police Director in Regensburg between March and April 1933. On 4 April, he was appointed Regierungspräsident (District President) for Middle Franconia and Upper Franconia, with his seat in Ansbach. He would hold these posts until 8 May 1934. On 5 July 1934, he became State Secretary and political advisor to the Reichsstatthalter (Reich Governor) of Bavaria, Franz Ritter von Epp, his former Freikorps commander. In this post, he carried out most of the functions of the office, with Epp serving as a figurehead. Hofmann was also given a five-year appointment as an honorary lay judge of the People's Court at its founding on 13 July 1934. He was awarded the honorary rank of Generalmajor of reserves on 20 April 1937.

Hofmann died of a heart attack on 31 January 1942 in Munich. On Hitler's orders, a state funeral took place on 4 February 1942 in the Bavarian Army Museum in Munich.

== Posthumous denazification ==
On 28 April 1948, a posthumous denazification tribunal in Munich classified him as being in Group II (offender) and ordered the confiscation of 40% of his estate. On appeal in March 1949, the Munich Arbitration Chamber reduced the penalty to 40% of his estate in Bavaria. In 1951, his widow was awarded a reduced survivor pension.

== Sources ==
- "Gen. Hofmann Dead, Germany Announces", The New York Times, 5 February 1942, p. 5.
- Hofmann, Hans Georg in Deutsche Biographie
- Hofmann, (Johann) Hans entry in Staatsminister, Leitende Verwaltungsbeamte und (NS-)Funktionsträger in Bayern, 1918 bis 1945.
- Information about Hans Georg Hofmann in the Reichstag database
- Miller, Michael D.; Schulz, Andreas (2015). Leaders of the Storm Troops. Vol. 1. Solihull, England: Helion & Company. ISBN 978-1-909-98287-1.
- Siemens, Daniel (2017). Stormtroopers: A New History of Hitler's Brownshirts. New Haven: Yale University Press. ISBN 978-0-300-19681-8.
- Stockhorst, Erich (1985). 5000 Köpfe: Wer War Was im 3. Reich. Arndt. p.206. ISBN 978-3-887-41116-9.
