= Kronach–Nordhalben railway =

Railway line in Germany

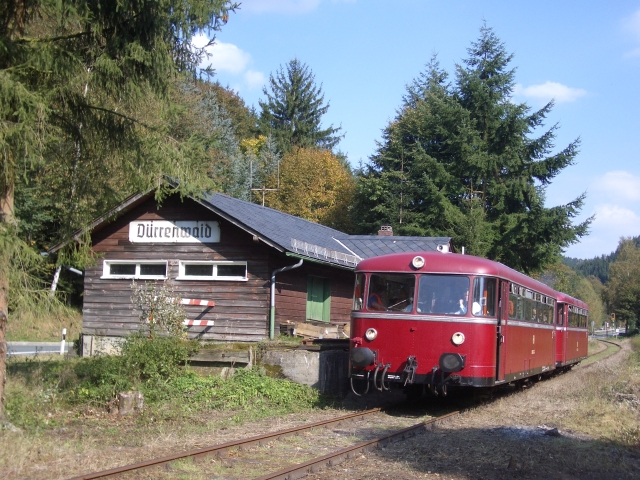
- Railbus as the museum train at Dürrenwaid station

Overview
- Line number: 5012

Service
- Route number: ex 829

Technical
- Line length: 24.88 km (15.46 mi)
- Track gauge: 1,435 mm (4 ft 8 1/2 in)

The Kronach–Nordhalben railway also known as the Rodach Valley Railway (Rodachtalbahn) in the Franconian Forest in Germany is a single-tracked branch line from Kronach via Steinwiesen to Nordhalben with a total length (originally) of 24.88 km (15.46 mi).

The branch line was opened on 26 July 1900. Passenger services were withdrawn on 30 May 1976, goods continued to be transported until 25 September 1994 to Nordhalben. On 27 May goods services from Höfles–Wallenfels were withdrawn, on 11 August the last goods train ran from the siding of the Loewe AG in Kronach to Höfles. This factory was still connected to the railway network until 1 August 2002, after when all traffic ceased on the line. After the closure of the infrastructure between Kronach and Steinwiesen the tracks were lifted in 2005.

On the remaining eleven kilometres between Steinwiesen and the terminus of Nordhalben the Rodach Valley Railway Society (Eisenbahnfreunde Rodachtalbahn e. V.) has operated a museum railway since 15 September 2007. The museum train comprises an Uerdingen railbus, no. 798 731, with a driving trailer, no. 998 744. It runs on Sundays and public holidays in summer and autumn.

The station at Dürrenwaid reopened in 2008. It lies just under four kilometres from the village of the same name in the municipality of Geroldsgrün and still has the original classic Bavarian Haltestelle station building, so typical of Bavarian branch lines, which is listed by the Bavarian State Office for Historical Monuments (Bayerisches Landesamt für Denkmalpflege).

== Sources ==
- Ralf Ellinger (2003), Die Rodachtalbahn – Geschichte der Lokalbahn von Kronach nach Nordhalben (in German), Eisenbahnfreunde Rodachtalbahn e.V.
