= Dürrenwaid station =

Heritage railway station in Germany

Coordinates: 50°21′26″N 11°31′02″E

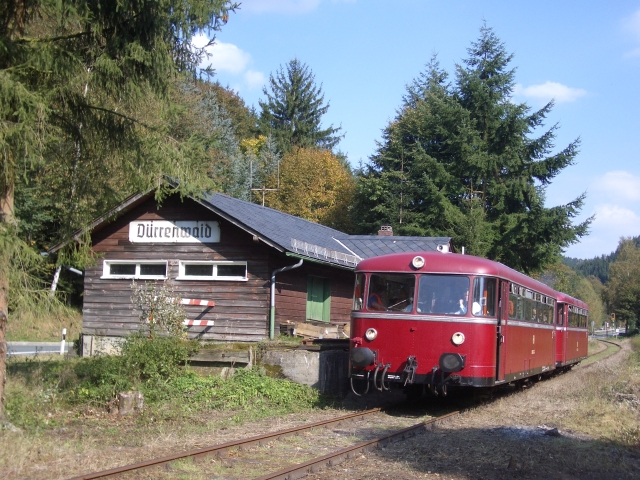
Railbus forming a museum train at Dürrenwaid station

Dürrenwaid station is a former railway station on the Rodach Valley railway or Rodachtalbahn in southern Germany. It was built in 1901 at kilometre 23.37, about 3 kilometres outside the village of Dürrenwaid in the area of the market town of Nordhalben in Bavaria.

The station building is a single-storey, wooden-boarded affair. It is topped with a flat, slate-covered, saddleback roof.

The loading sidings at the station were used until the 1980s as a loading point for the school furniture factory of AMA and the television manufacturer Graetz.

On 30 May 1976 passenger services on the line were withdrawn, and the loading sidings were dismantled on 29 April 1985.

For a long time the building was used as a holiday home by a family from Berlin, which protected it from being knocked down. Since its acquisition by the Rodach Valley Railway Society (Eisenbahnfreunde Rodachtalbahn) it has served as a home for the society and an operations building for the museum railway that has been in operation on the line since September 2007.
