= Josef Müller (politician) =

German politician (1898–1979)

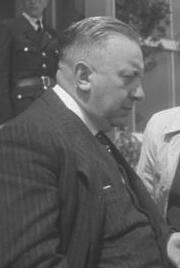

Chairman of the Christian Social Union of Bavaria
- In office 1946–1949
- Succeeded by: Hans Ehard

Personal details
- Born: 20 March 1898 Steinwiesen, Kingdom of Bavaria, German Empire
- Died: 12 September 1979 (aged 81) Munich, Bavaria, West Germany
- Party: Bavarian People's Party (Before 1933); Christian Social Union (1945–1952)

Josef Müller (27 March 1898 – 12 September 1979), also known as "Ochsensepp" ("Joe Ox"), was a German politician. He was a member of the resistance during World War II and afterwards one of the founders of the Christian Social Union (CSU). He was a devout Catholic and a leading figure in the Catholic resistance to Adolf Hitler.

== Early life ==
Müller was born on 27 March 1898, in Steinwiesen, Kingdom of Bavaria. Müller was a lifelong Catholic. He entered the legal profession after serving as a mortar-man in the Royal Bavarian Army on the Western Front from 1916 to 1919.

He was discharged as a senior sergeant.

Müller became politically active during the Weimar Republic as a member of the Bavarian People's Party.

== Third Reich ==
During the Nazi period, he worked as an attorney defending many Nazi opponents. He was also part of the Catholic resistance and was in contact with resistance figures in the Abwehr (German military intelligence) such as Admiral Canaris, Hans von Dohnanyi and Hans Oster.

=== Missions to Rome ===
Early in the war (1939–1940), Müller made a number of trips to the Vatican City under the identity "X". He carried correspondence between the German Resistance and British intelligence that sought co-operation in a coup to replace Hitler's regime with an anti-Nazi civilian government supported by the German military. The correspondence and related intelligence passed through an intermediary to the hands of Pope Pius XII, who would review it and in turn forward it to Lord Halifax in Britain. Dohnanyi summarized the material into a report, containing list of individuals slated to assume roles in a post-coup civilian government, which were contained in the Zossen documents. Müller's Vatican negotiations in the winter of 1939–1940, in which the British government indicated willingness to treat with a successor non-Nazi government, were summarised in the X Report—the most sensitive document in the Zossen archive—and their exposure through the safe's discovery on 22 September 1944 implicated Müller in high treason, though he was ultimately not convicted because he continued to justify his actions as having been part of Abwehr intelligence operations.

The Pope's Private Secretary, Robert Leiber, acted as the intermediary for Pius and met with Müller, who visited Rome in 1939 and 1940. The Vatican considered Müller to be a representative of Colonel-General Beck and agreed to offer the machinery for mediation between the German Resistance and the Allies. Hans Oster, Wilhelm Canaris and Hans von Dohnányi, backed by Beck, told Müller to ask Pius to ascertain whether the British would enter negotiations with the German opposition which wanted to overthrow Hitler. The British agreed to negotiate, provided the Vatican could vouch for the opposition's representative. Pius, communicating with Britain's Francis d'Arcy Osborne, channelled communications back and forth in secrecy. The Vatican agreed to send a letter outlining the basis for peace with England and the participation of the Pope was used to try to persuade senior German Generals Halder and Brauchitsch to act against Hitler. Negotiations were tense, with a Western offensive expected, and on the basis that substantive negotiations could only follow the replacement of the Hitler regime. The British government had doubts as to the capacity of the conspirators. Nevertheless, the resistance were encouraged by the talks, and Müller told Leiber that a coup would occur in February. Pius appeared to continue to hope for a coup in Germany into March 1940. The negotiations ultimately proved fruitless. Hitler's swift victories over France and the Low Countries deflated the will of the German military to resist Hitler. Müller was arrested during the Nazis first raid on Military Intelligence in 1943. He spent the rest of the war in concentration camps, ending up at Dachau.

=== Imprisonment ===
After his arrest in 1943 he was interned at the concentration camp Flossenbürg. Unlike fellow inmates Canaris, Oster and Bonhoeffer, who were executed in April 1945, Müller was spared at the last moment, at the foot of the scaffold, through the intervention of Johann Rattenhuber who convinced Ernst Kaltenbrunner that keeping Müller alive might help Germany negotiate more favourable surrender terms. Instead, Müller was transferred to Tyrol in late April 1945 along with 138 other "special prisoners" (Sonderhäftlinge) and "kin prisoners" (Sippenhäftlinge), persons of prominence the Nazi SS had hauled off in the final days of the war to Niederdorf, South Tyrol, where they were to be hidden and used as bargaining chips. They were liberated by the Fifth U.S. Army on 5 May 1945.

== Later life ==
After the war, he advocated forming a new Christian party of both Catholics and Protestants. With Adam Stegerwald, he was one of the founders of the Christian Social Union (CSU), serving as the party's first chairman from 1946 to 1949. Müller belonged to the more liberal wing of the party and was the main opponent of the more conservative wing under Alois Hundhammer. He was one of the patrons of the young Franz Josef Strauß.

After the CSU had won the first postwar elections in 1946, Hundhammer opposed Müller's nomination as minister-president of Bavaria and proposed for Hans Ehard to be elected as a compromise candidate instead. Once elected, Ehard appointed Hundhammer as minister of culture, but in 1947, Müller entered the cabinet as well as minister of justice. From 1950 onwards, he also was deputy prime minister. He resigned from the government in 1952.

Müller published his memoirs in 1975. He died on 12 September 1979, in Munich.

== Bibliography ==
- Chowaniec, Elisabeth (1991). Der „Fall Dohnanyi" 1943–1945: Widerstand, Militärjustiz, SS-Willkür. Schriftenreihe der Vierteljahrshefte für Zeitgeschichte (in German). Vol. 62. Munich: R. Oldenbourg. ISBN 978-3-48664-562-0.
- Hoffmann, Peter (1977). The History of the German Resistance, 1933–1945. Cambridge, MA: MIT Press. ISBN 978-0-26208-088-0.

=== Further reading ===
- Alf Mintzel: Die CSU. Anatomie einer konservativen Partei 1945–1972. Opladen 1975 (in German).
