= Zollernbahn Railway Society =

German railway society for historic trains

Coordinates: 48.16583°N 8.64164°E

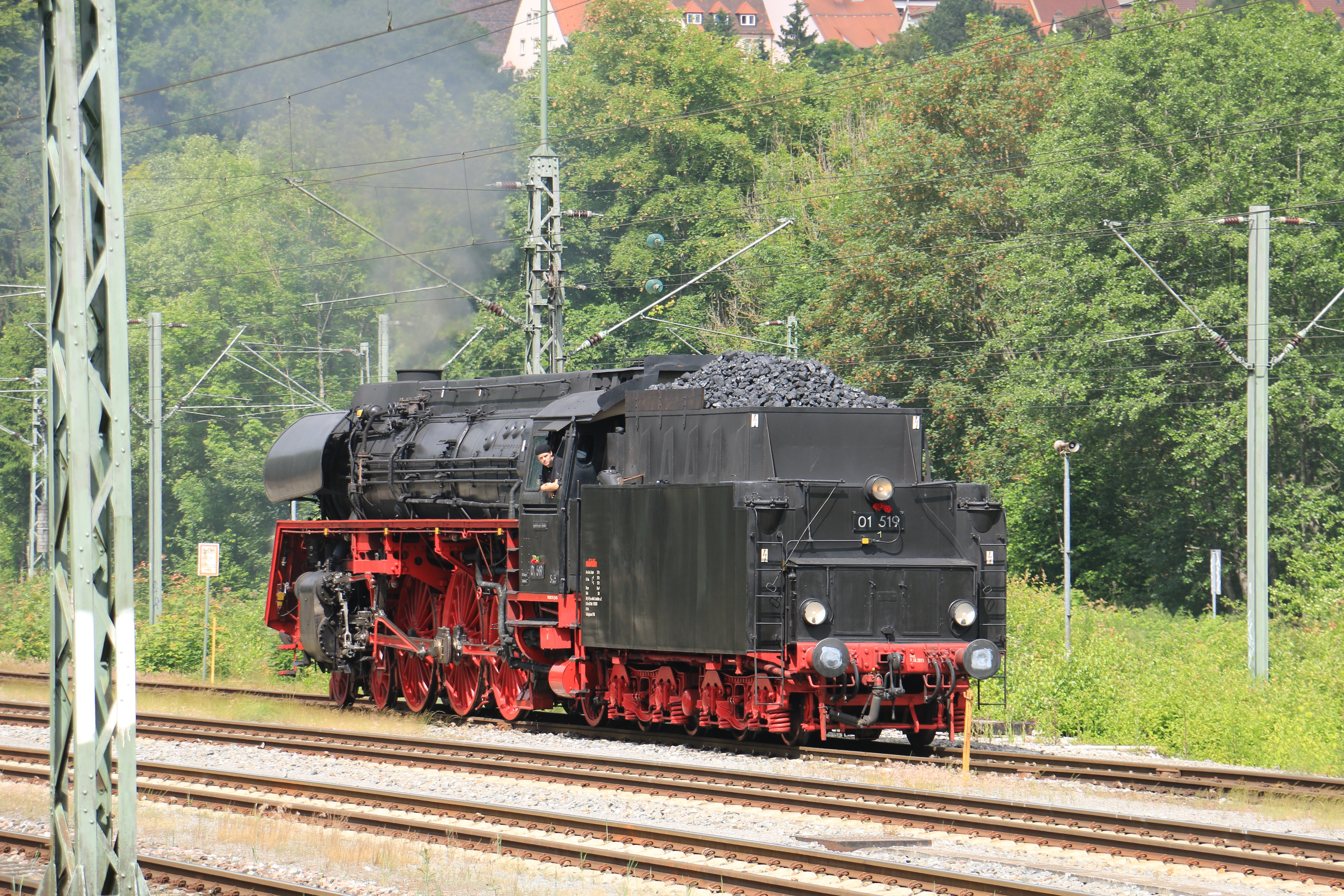
Steam locomotive 01 519 of EFZ

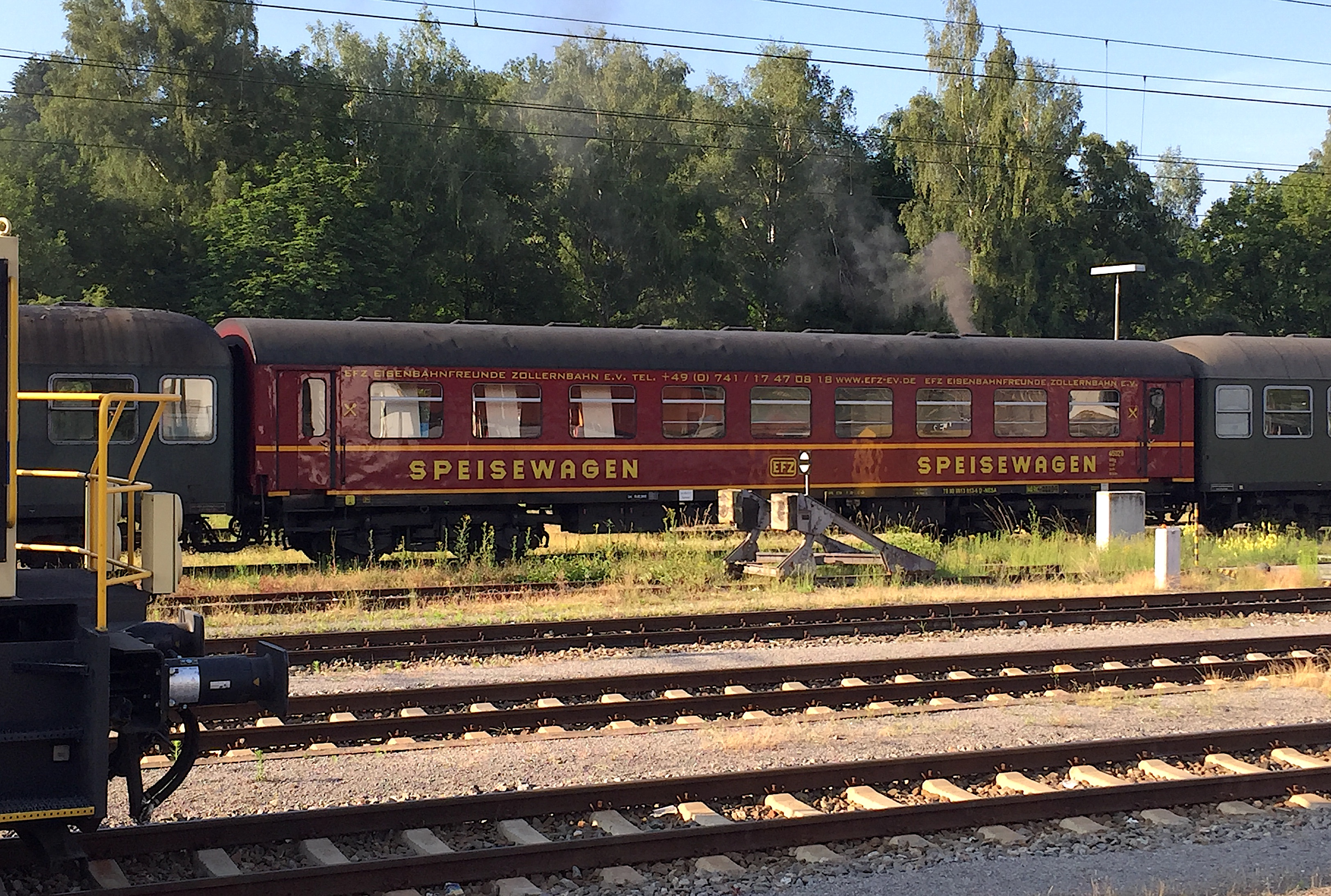
Dining car of EFZ (2017)

The Eisenbahnfreunde Zollernbahn (EFZ) (Zollernbahn Railway Society) is a German railway society dedicated to the preservation of historic railway vehicles, especially steam locomotives, where possible in working order. The society arranges day and shuttle trips, predominantly in Baden-Württemberg in southwestern Germany. It is based at Rottweil.

The operating company for the EFZ is the NeSA Eisenbahn-Betriebsgesellschaft Neckar-Schwarzwald-Alb-mbH ('Neckar-Black Forest-Alb Railway Operating Company').

== History ==
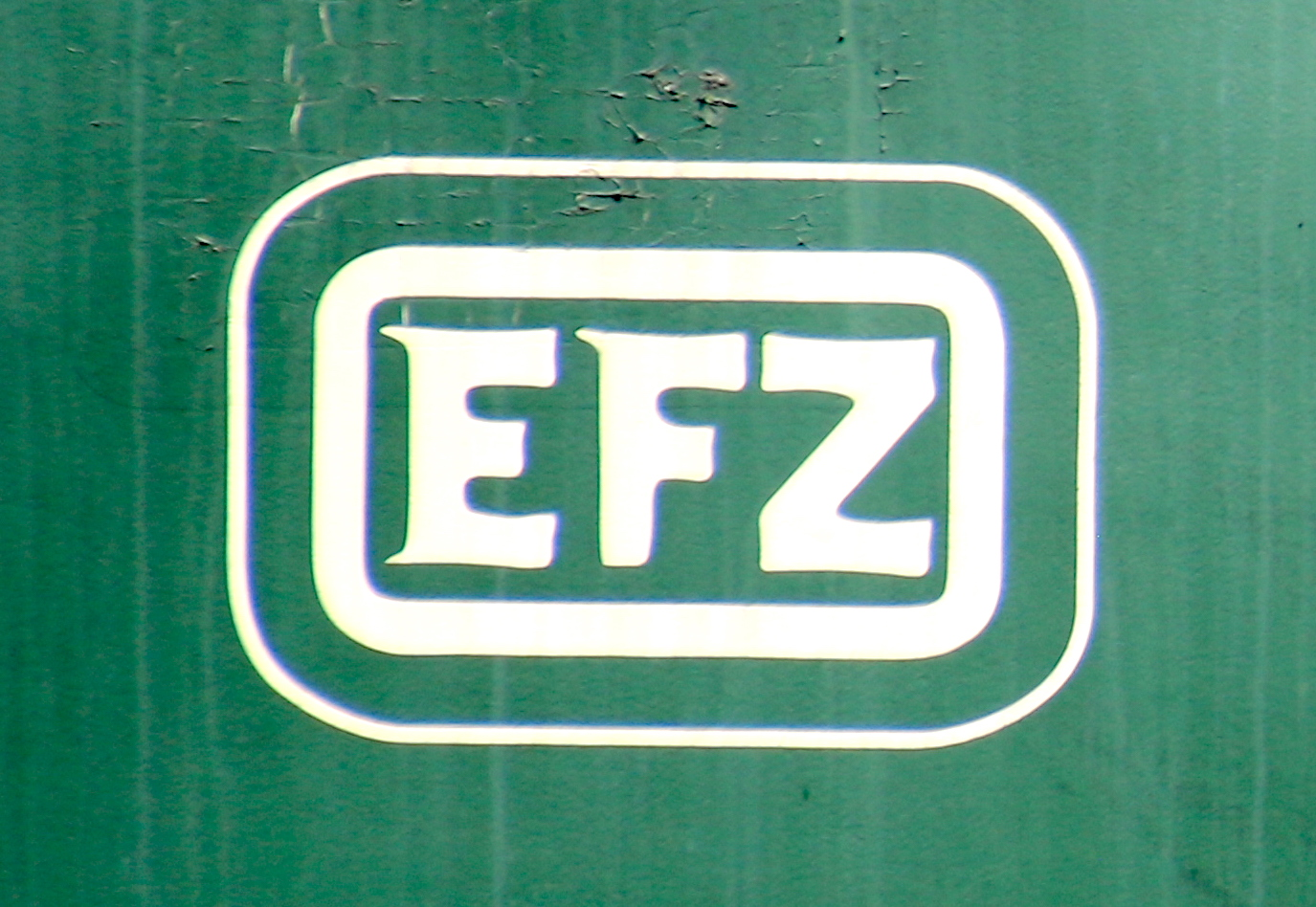
Symbol of Zollernbahn Railway Society EFZ

The society was founded in 1973 in Balingen, Baden-Württemberg, by a number of railway fans, most of whom already knew each other but who now wanted to work more closely together. They gave talks and produced reports on railway history and operations. The society was named after the Zollernbahn (Zollern railway) which was near Balingen.

On 6 April 1973 the EFZ organised its first special railway trip with a DRG Class 38 (ex-Prussian P 8) steam locomotive and coaches hired from the Deutsche Bundesbahn.

On 31 December 1974 the final journey took place of the last Prussian steam locomotive classes in service with the Bundesbahn: the Class 78 (Prussian T 18), and Class 38 (Prussian P 8). The German television company, ARD, reported the event on their news channel. In 1975 the society acquired the first vehicles of its own: a fast-stopping train coach rebuilt into a company coach and its first locomotive, number 64 289.

In 1977 the specials no longer took place on Bundesbahn tracks due to their ban on steam traction, but on private railways, especially the Hohenzollerische Landesbahn (HzL) and Württembergische Eisenbahn-Gesellschaft (WEG). In 1982 the EFZ began regular museum railway services on the HzL route from Kleinengstingen to Gammertingen and, in 1984, also between Hechingen and Eyach (a suburb of Eutingen im Gäu).

Since 1993 the EFZ locos have once again been allowed to run on Bundesbahn routes. Since then there have been trips all over southwestern Germany and beyond. A tradition since 1978 has been the so-called 'Three Kings Programme' (Dreikönigsprogramm) annually on 6 January. Really sensational were several foreign and long-distance trips with steam locomotives, for example in 1993 and 1995 to Vienna, in 1995 to Austria, Italy and Slovenia to Ljubljana, in 1996 to Dresden and on to Berlin, and in 2007 to Nordhausen. In 1996 the society's vehicles covered 197,000 km, locomotive no. 01 519 sometimes clocked up over 20,000 km annually during the 1990s.

The EFZ's base was transferred in early 2007 from Tübingen locomotive depot to Rottweil.

== Running and rolling stock ==
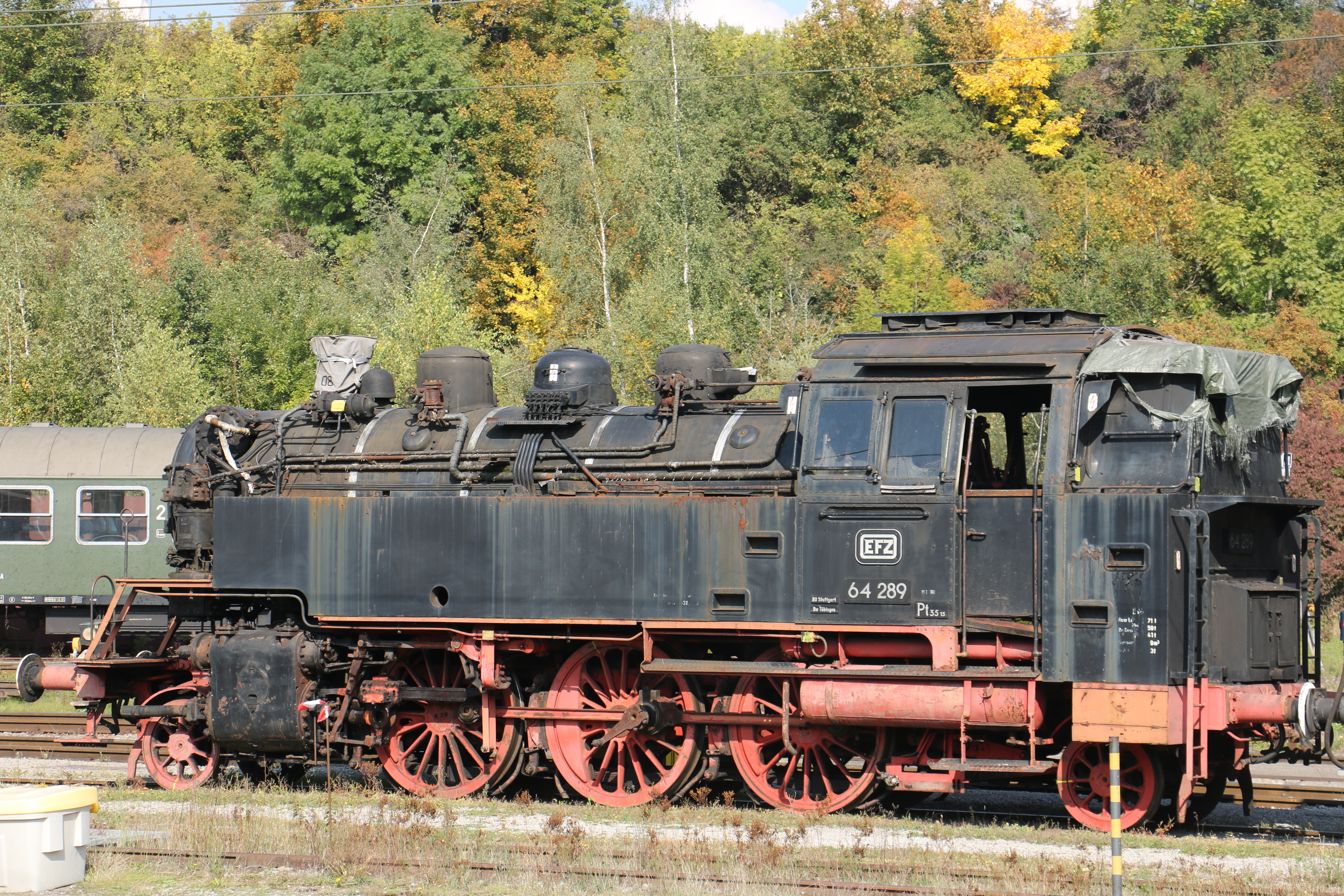
Steam locomotive 64 289 of EFZ

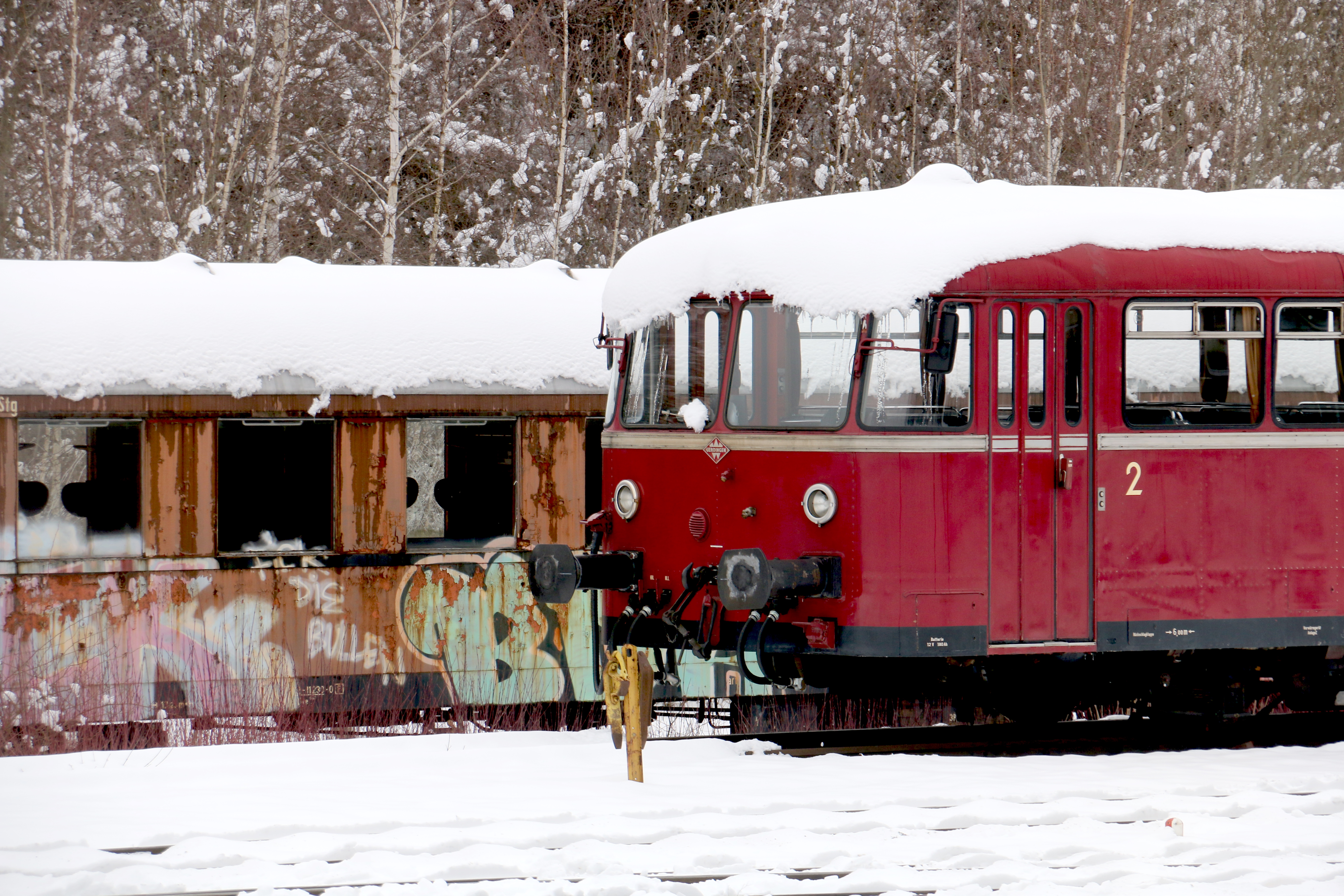
Uerdingen railbus of EFZ (2018)

As at March 2008 the following locomotives belonged to the EFZ:

- 01 519, operational since 2015
- 52 7596, operational since December 2010
- 50 245, store, not operational
- 64 289, stored at the South German Railway Museum, Heilbronn
- 796 625 (Uerdingen railbus), operational, at Rottweil.

The railbus is operated by the Interessengemeinschaft 796 625 e.V, which was founded in 2004 by several EFZ members in order to preserve 796 625 and to exploit it commercially.

In addition numerous wagons belong to the EFZ, notably four-wheeled platform coaches, ex-ÖBB, and express and fast-stopping train coaches from the 1930s and 40s. They are stored, but not all are operational. Still working are the six Class Bn coaches acquired from the CFL in Luxembourg in 2005 as well as the dining car, WRg 45 029.

== Zollernbahn-Echo newspaper ==
The EFZ used to publish a paper called the Zollernbahn-Echo, which contained articles about railway history and operations as well as news about vehicle relocations. For four years the paper was an interesting source of information, not just for members.

In addition the EFZ publishes special editions of the paper. The first special editions 038 382 - 038 711 - 038 772 were reprinted and sold for 50 pfennigs on the first special trip.

== See also ==
- History of rail transport in Germany
- List of DRG locomotives and railbuses
- List of DB locomotives and railbuses
