= Franconian Museum Railway =

Franconian Museum Railway (Fränkische Museums Eisenbahn)
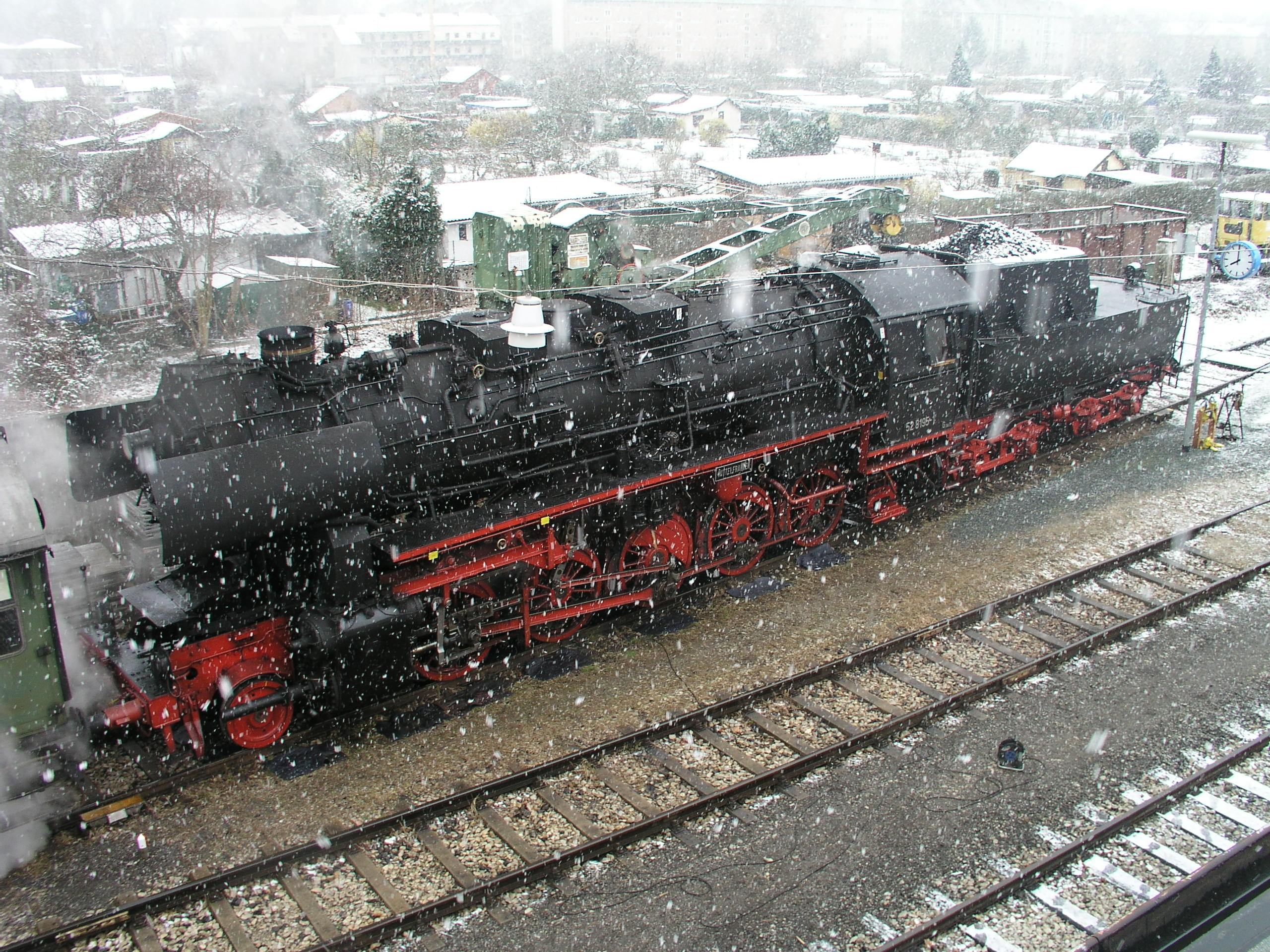
- Locomotive 52 8195 Easter Sunday 2008
- Locale: Bavaria
- Terminus: Nürnberg North East

The Franconian Museum Railway (German: Fränkische Museums Eisenbahn) is an association whose purpose is to preserve and promote interest in historic railway vehicles. Since 1996 it has been accredited also as a railway company.

The association was established in 1985 in Nuremberg. In this industrial city it aims to preserve the memory of the steam locomotive era.

Until then there was no such institution except the Nuremberg Transport Museum. The intention was that the association would not only preserve and document steam rail memorabilia, but also maintain historically authentic stock and operate special rail journeys to capture the "atmosphere" of steam rail travel.

== Museum railway ==
The Franconian Museum Railway runs steam trains from Nuremberg on the so-called Gräfenberger Lokalbahn (Grafenberg local line) to the town of Gräfenberg, known as the "Gateway to Franconian Switzerland", 30 kilometres away. It also runs specials in Bavaria.

== Railway vehicles ==
The society owns the following railway vehicles:

=== Locomotives ===
- Steam locomotive 52 8195
- Diesel locomotive V 60 11011
- Diesel locomotive 231 399
- Diesel locomotive V 200 001
- Diesel locomotive V 10b
- Diesel locomotive MV 6a
- Shunter DB Köf III, no. 332 271
- Shunter DRG Köf II, no. 322 614
- Shunter 323 016
- Shunter 323 733
- Shunter 323 958
- Shunter Kö Typ RL12
- Shunter Kö Typ N4
- Shunter TGK 2 (former USSR)

=== Wagons ===
- Rebuild coach 75 406 Nür
- Rebuild coach 75 686 Nür
- Rebuild coach 87 650 Nür
- Rebuild coach 87 939 Nür
- Rebuild coach 88 350 Nür
- Rebuild coach 89 203 Nür
- Rebuild coach 90 354 Nür
- Donnerbüchse 83 485 Nür
- Donnerbüchse 84 030 Nür
- Donnerbüchse -
- Donnerbüchse -
- Express train coach 11 544 Nür
- Dining car 51 50 88-45 030-6
- Makeshift passenger coach 302 313 Nür
- Makeshift passenger coach 302 682 Nür
- Luggage van 50 80 92-11 789-6
- Half luggage van 98 133 Nür
- Luggage van 20 80 950 6 902-6
