= Sehnde =

- Town
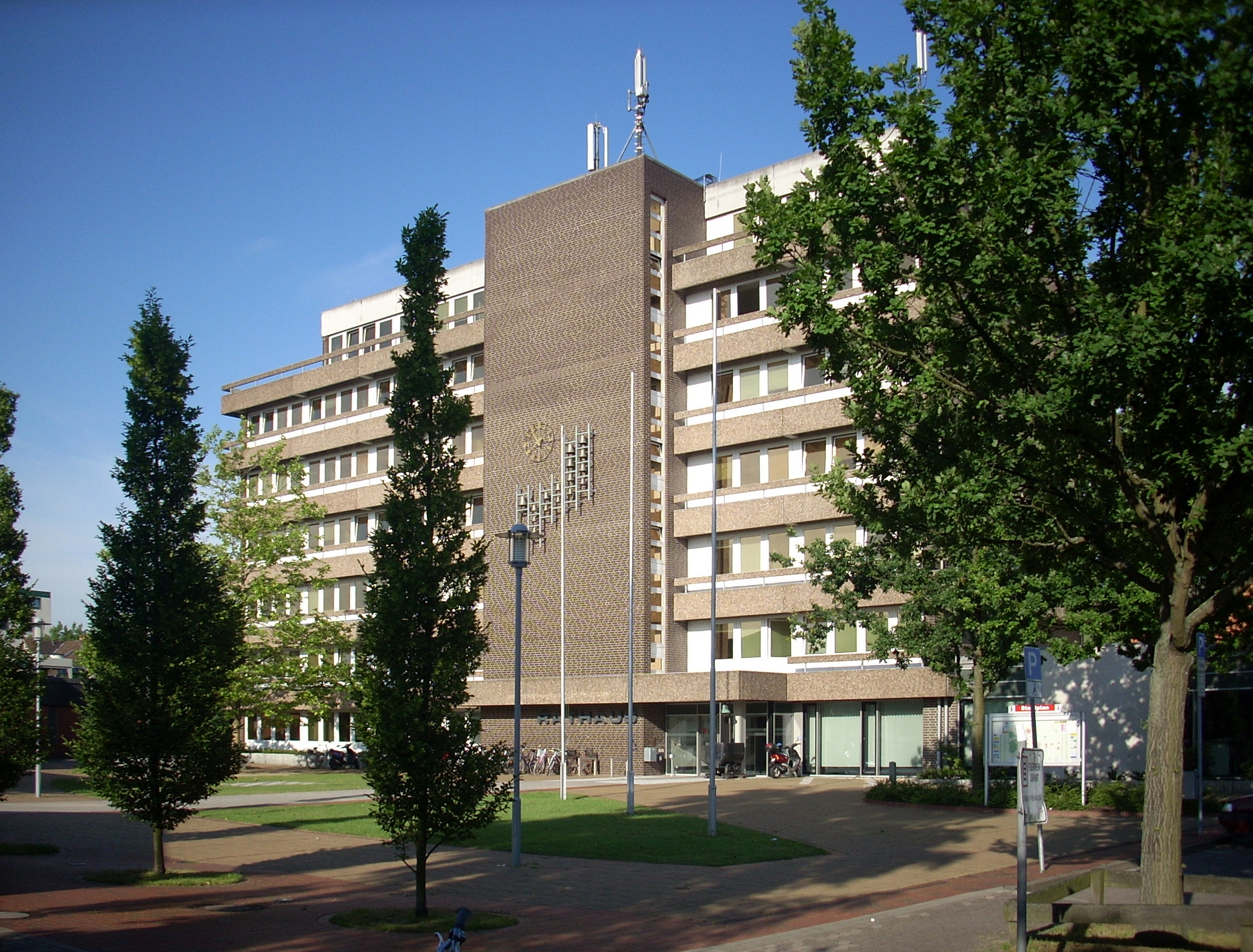
- Town hall

- Coat of arms

- Location of Sehnde within Hanover district
- Interactive map of Sehnde
- Location within Germany Location within Lower Saxony
- Coordinates: 52°18′58″N 9°57′51″E
- Country: Germany
- State: Lower Saxony
- District: Hanover
- Subdivisions: 15 districts

Government
  - Mayor (2019–24): Olaf Kruse (SPD)

Area
  - Total: 103.58 km^{2} (39.99 sq mi)
- Elevation: 53 m (174 ft)

Population (2025-12-31)
  - Total: 23,414
  - Density: 226.05/km^{2} (585.46/sq mi)
- Time zone: UTC+01:00 (CET)
  - Summer (DST): UTC+02:00 (CEST)
- Postal codes: 31319
- Dialling codes: 05138, 05132 (Ilten)
- Vehicle registration: H
- Website: www.sehnde.de

Sehnde (German pronunciation: [ˈzeːndə]) is a town in Lower Saxony, Germany. It is located approximately 15 kilometres southeast of Hanover.

== History ==
Sehnde was formed in 1974 by combining fifteen autonomous villages which belonged to three different districts: Bilm, Bolzum, Dolgen, Evern, Gretenberg, Haimar, Höver, Ilten, Klein Lobke, Müllingen, Rethmar, Sehnde, Wassel, Wehmingen, and Wirringen. Sehnde received its town charter in 1997.

The whole area was agricultural for centuries, until large salt and potash deposits were discovered at the end of the 19th century. Several potash mines were dug, the first at Gustavshall in Hohenfels in 1896. During the 20th century, Sehnde and Ilten were the chief beneficiaries of the mines, until the last one was closed in 1995. Since the 1950s, most of the area has been transformed into dormitory villages, while jobs have concentrated in Hannover. In 2005, small one-family houses dominate large parts of Sehnde and its villages.

== Culture & Tourist Attractions ==
The former potash mine Hohenfels in Wehmingen houses the national German tramway museum, the Hannoversches Straßenbahn-Museum.

The core city of Sehnde is characterized by some characteristic buildings:

- Evangelical-Lutheran Church of the Holy Cross (Romanesque tower, baroque ship)
- St. Mary’s Roman Catholic parish church, 1955 (simple hall church)
- Townhall, 1976 (with Carillon)
- Kugelbake 1703 at the canal sports harbor, reduced copy of the Cuxhaven seamark

== Economy and infrastructure ==
The ceramic facility (Keramische Hütte) produced bricks from around 1900 until it was closed in 1982. The districts of today's city Sehnde are characterized by agriculture. Most of the districts have changed from new development areas to residential areas since the 1970s. The Sehnde prison was opened in 2004. As a result, the population continued to increase.

=== Kaliwerke ===
The Hohenfels Kaliwerk (potash factory) was closed in 1982. From 1984 to 1992, the pit buildings were filled with slurry from the Halde Friedrichshall. The mine construction was filled with lye from the Halde Friedrichshall from 1984 to 1992. The Kaliwerk Friedrichshall existed from 1905 to 1981, managed by Kali Chemie AG. It was taken over by K+S AG and existed until 1994.

Since 1994 K+S Baustoffrecycling specializes in the recycling of non-hazardous soil and construction waste.

=== Local companies and industry diversity ===
In addition to the traditional branches of industry such as the Kaliwerke, Sehnde is characterized by a diverse economic landscape. Craftsmanship businesses and service companies are represented in the community. Many companies offer a variety of handicraft services and are active in the area, throughout Germany or even internationally.

Raum und Handwerk Verwaltung GmbH – a company based in Sehnde offers a variety of handicraft services, including carpentry, interior design, shop fittings, trade fair and event construction. Ernst G. Beißner GmbH & Co. Internationale Möbelspedition KG, a traditional company in the logistics industry, known for the transport and storage of high quality furniture. It operates regionally and internationally.

Companies from the construction industry and building materials manufacturing are based in Sehnde and serve regional and national markets. One example ist the BHS Bauzentrum bauSpezi.

The service sector is represented by various companies that offer a wide range of services. An example of a business is 1A Textilveredelung, which specializes in the finishing of textiles and works for both private and business customers worldwide. Patches are mainly produced here, a sewing service is offered and companies are advised on how to spread their brand messages in analog form.
