= Jagst Valley Railway =

Railway line in Germany

Möckmühl–Dörzbach
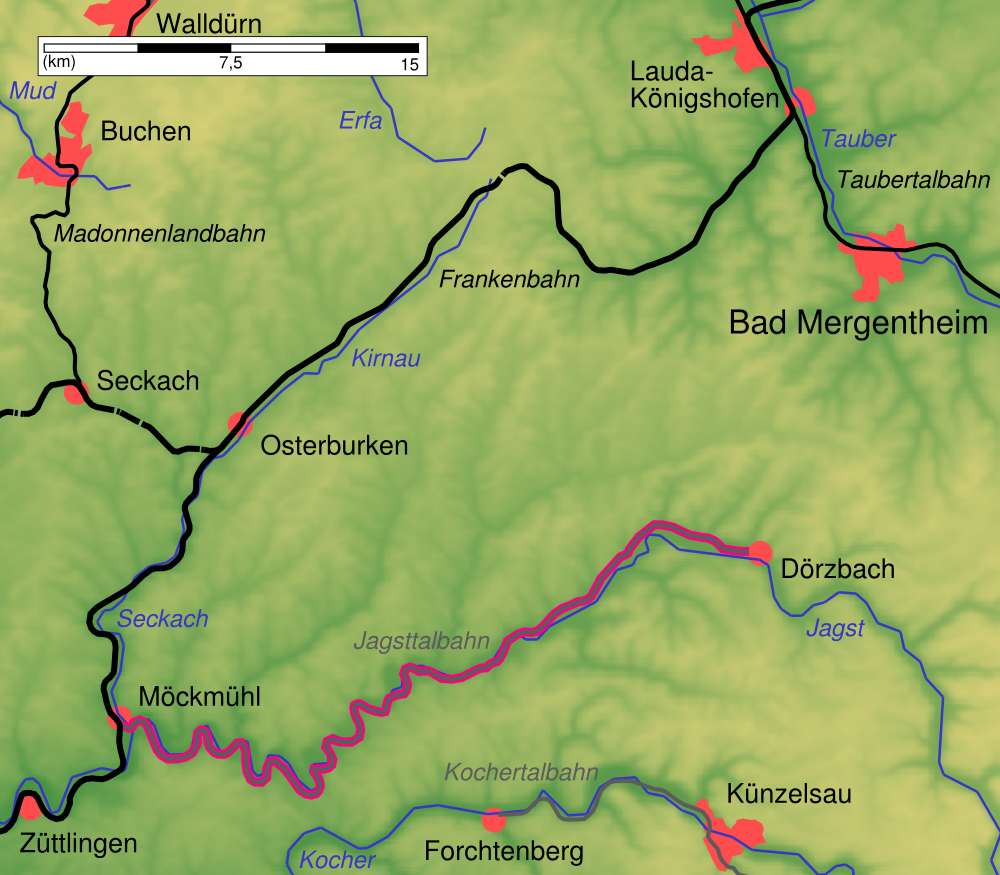

Overview
- Line number: 9490

Service
- Route number: KBS 778 (to 1988)

Technical
- Line length: 39.1 km
- Track gauge: 750 mm
- Minimum radius: 65 m

The Jagst Valley Railway (German: Jagsttalbahn) is a 39.1-kilometre-long, single tracked narrow gauge railway in the north of the German state of Baden-Württemberg that was closed between 1988 and 2021. It has a railway gauge of 750 millimetres.

In the meantime, the narrow gauge railway was run by the German Railway Operating Company (Deutsche Eisenbahn-Betriebs-Gesellschaft or DEBG), later the Southwest German Railway Company (SWEG Südwestdeutsche Landesverkehr-GmbH or SWEG) and then the German Railway History Company (DGEG). The latest inaugural service as a museum railway, this time under the leadership of the "Friends of the Jagst Valley Railway (Jagsttalbahnfreunde), took place in November 2021 on the first section of the route in Dörzbach.

The Jagst Valley Railway and the Öchsle (former DB narrow-gauge railway from Biberach (a.d. Riß) via Warthausen to Ochsenhausen) are the last surviving operational routes of the once extensive Württemberg 750 mm narrow-gauge railways.

== Literature ==
- Michael Brod (1979), Die Jagsttalbahn Möckmühl–Dörzbach (in German), Karlsruhe: Deutsche Gesellschaft für Eisenbahngeschichte
- Hermann Braun (1984), Die Fahrzeuge der Jagsttalbahn: Dampflokomotiven, Diesellokomotiven, Triebwagen, Personenwagen, Postwagen, Gepäckwagen, Güterwagen, Rollböcke, Pufferwagen, Spezialfahrzeuge (in German), Dörzbach: Jagsttalbahn-Freunde, ISBN 3-924660-00-X
- Martin Uhlig (1986), Die Jagsttalbahn (in German), München: Bahn-Verlag Schiefer, ISBN 3-924969-01-9
- Scharf, Hans-Wolfgang (2001). Eisenbahnen zwischen Neckar, Tauber und Main: Historische Entwicklung und Bahnbau (in German). ISBN 3882557664.
- Scharf, Hans-Wolfgang (2001). Eisenbahnen zwischen Neckar, Tauber und Main: Ausgestaltung, Betrieb und Maschinendienst (in German). ISBN 3882557680.
- Utz von Wagner (2002), Die Jagsttalbahn: auf schmaler Spur von Möckmühl nach Dörzbach (in German), Freiburg (Breisgau): EK-Verlag, ISBN 3-88255-453-3
- Gerd Wolff, Hans-Dieter Menges (1992), Deutsche Klein- und Privatbahnen. Band 2: Baden (in German), Freiburg: EK-Verlag, pp. 336–354, ISBN 3-88255-653-6
- Mihailescu, Peter-Michael; Michalke, Matthias (January 1985). Vergessene Bahnen in Baden-Württemberg (in German). pp. 153–157. ISBN 3806204136.

== Film ==
- Eisenbahn-Romantik, Folge 243: Die Jagsttalbahn, (SWR)
