= DRG Class 64 =

Class of 520 German 2-6-2T locomotives

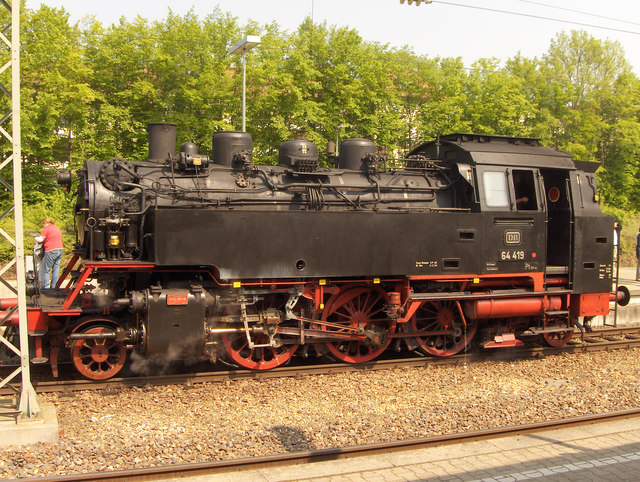
- 64 419 of the DBK Historic Railway
Type and origin
- Power type: Steam
- Builder: Borsig (13); Hanomag (21); Henschel & Sohn (31); AEG (6); Krupp (65); Union Gießerei Königsberg (40); AG Vulcan Stettin (23); R. Wolf AG (14); Maschinenbau Anstalt Humboldt (21); Arnold Jung Lokomotivfabrik (99); F. Schichau (12); Linke-Hofmann-Busch (13); Orenstein & Koppel (51); Maschinenfabrik Esslingen (45); Krauss-Maffei (66)
- Build date: 1928–1940
- Total produced: 520
Specifications
- Configuration
  - Whyte: 2-6-2T
  - UIC: 1′C1′ h2t
  - German: Pt 35.15
- Gauge: 1,435 mm (4 ft 8 1/2 in)
- Leading dia.: 850 mm (2 ft 9 1/2 in)
- Driver dia.: 1,500 mm (4 ft 11 in)
- Trailing dia.: 850 mm (2 ft 9 1/2 in)
- Wheelbase
  - Axle spacing (Asymmetrical): 2,700 mm (8 ft 10 1/4 in) +; 1,800 mm (5 ft 10 7/8 in) +; 1,800 mm (5 ft 10 7/8 in) +; 2,700 mm (8 ft 10 1/4 in) =
  - Engine: 9,000 mm (29 ft 6 3/8 in)
- Length
  - Over headstocks: 001–367: 11,100 mm (36 ft 5 in); 368–520: 11,200 mm (36 ft 9 in)
  - Over buffers: 001–367: 12,400 mm (40 ft 8 1/4 in); 368–520: 12,500 mm (41 ft 1/8 in)
- Height: 4,165 mm (13 ft 8 in)
- Axle load: 15.2 t (15.0 long tons; 16.8 short tons)
- Adhesive weight: 45.5 t (44.8 long tons; 50.2 short tons)
- Empty weight: 58.0 t (57.1 long tons; 63.9 short tons)
- Service weight: 74.9 t (73.7 long tons; 82.6 short tons)
- Fuel type: Coal
- Fuel capacity: 3 t (3.0 long tons; 3.3 short tons)
- Water cap.: 9 m^{3} (1,980 imp gal; 2,380 US gal)
- Firebox
  - Grate area: 2.04 m^{2} (22.0 sq ft)
- Boiler
  - Pitch: 2,700 mm (8 ft 10 1/4 in)
  - Tube plates: 3,800 mm (12 ft 5 5/8 in)
  - Small tubes: 44.5 mm (1 3/4 in), 114 off
  - Large tubes: 118 mm (4 5/8 in), 32 off
- Boiler pressure: 14 bar (14.3 kgf/cm^{2}; 203 psi)
- Heating surface
  - Firebox: 8.7 m^{2} (94 sq ft)
  - Tubes: 53.7 m^{2} (578 sq ft)
  - Flues: 42.0 m^{2} (452 sq ft)
  - Total surface: 104.4 m^{2} (1,124 sq ft)
- Superheater
  - Heating area: 37.18 m^{2} (400.2 sq ft)
- Cylinders: Two, outside
- Cylinder size: 500 mm × 660 mm (19 11/16 in × 26 in)
- Valve gear: Heusinger (Walschaerts) with Kuhn slides
- Train heating: Steam
- Loco brake: K-GP
Performance figures
- Maximum speed: 90 km/h (56 mph)
Career
- Numbers: DRG 64 001 – 64 520
- Retired: 1975

The Deutsche Reichsbahn had a standard passenger train tank engine with a wheel arrangement of 1′C1′ (UIC classification) or 2-6-2 (Whyte notation) and a low axle load, which was designated in their classification system as the DRG Class 64 (Baureihe 64). The Class 64 was developed from 1926 onwards and it was built between 1928 and 1940. Many German manufacturers contributed to the series.

== Construction ==
The boiler and elements of the driving gear were the same as those on the DRG Class 24. They had Bissel bogies, apart from the last ten engines which had a Krauss-Helmholtz bogie. From no. 64 368 onwards the engines were 100 millimetres (3 7/8 in) longer than their predecessors. The Class 64 engine was given the nickname "Bubikopf" ('bob') after a fashionable ladies hairstyle of the time.

== Service ==
After the Second World War 393 engines were still in service of which 278 went to the Deutsche Bundesbahn and 115 to the Deutsche Reichsbahn (East Germany). No. 64 311 remained in Austria after 1945 and became class 64 (Reihe 64) with the Austrian Federal Railways (Österreichische Bundesbahnen or ÖBB). Those engines left in Poland were given the classification OKl2 by the PKP. In 1968 there were still 60 machines in service with the Bundesbahn. Twenty Class 64 locomotives have been preserved, the majority in Germany.

== Preserved Locomotives ==
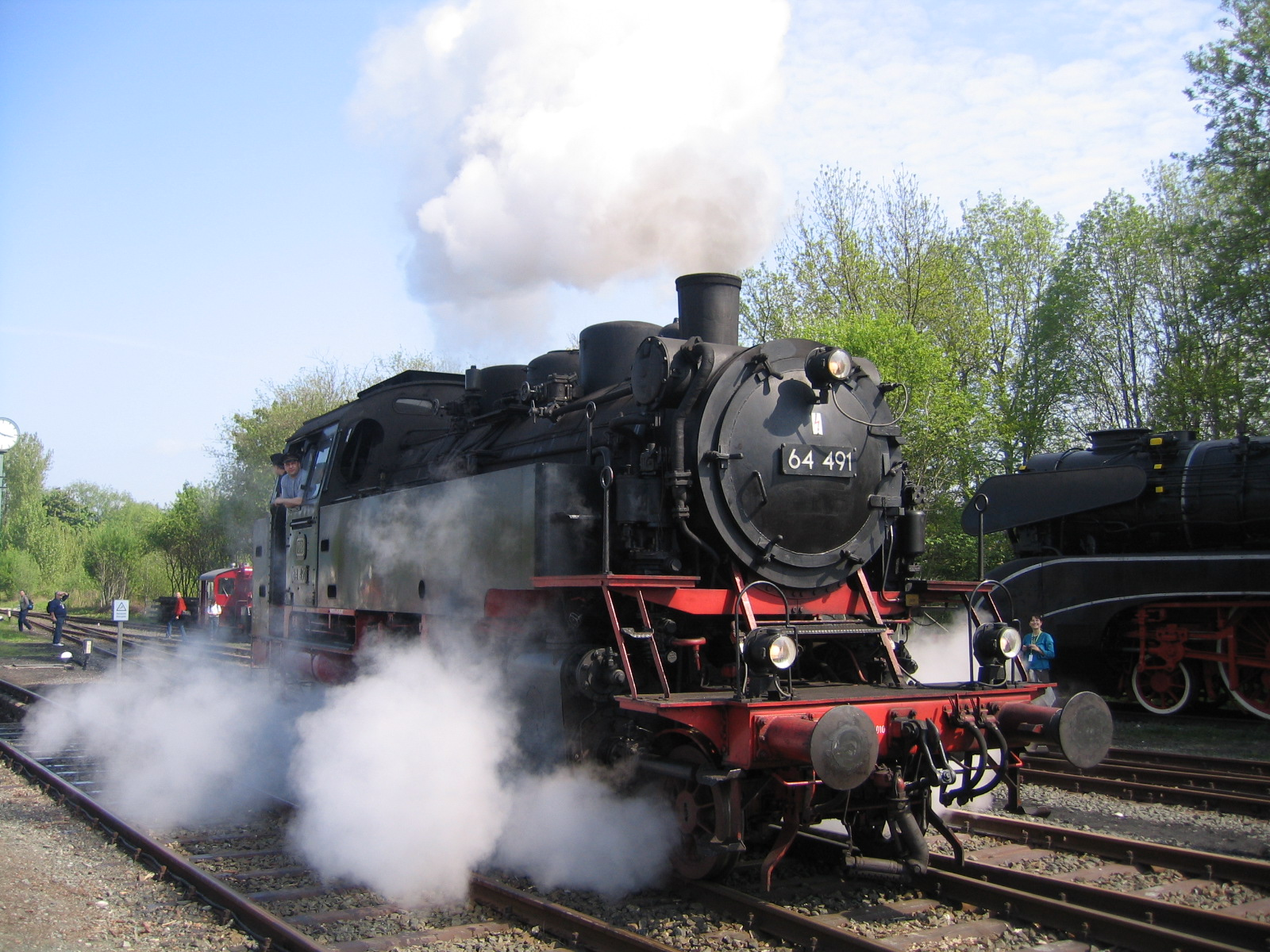
No. 64 491 at Neuenmarkt in 2010

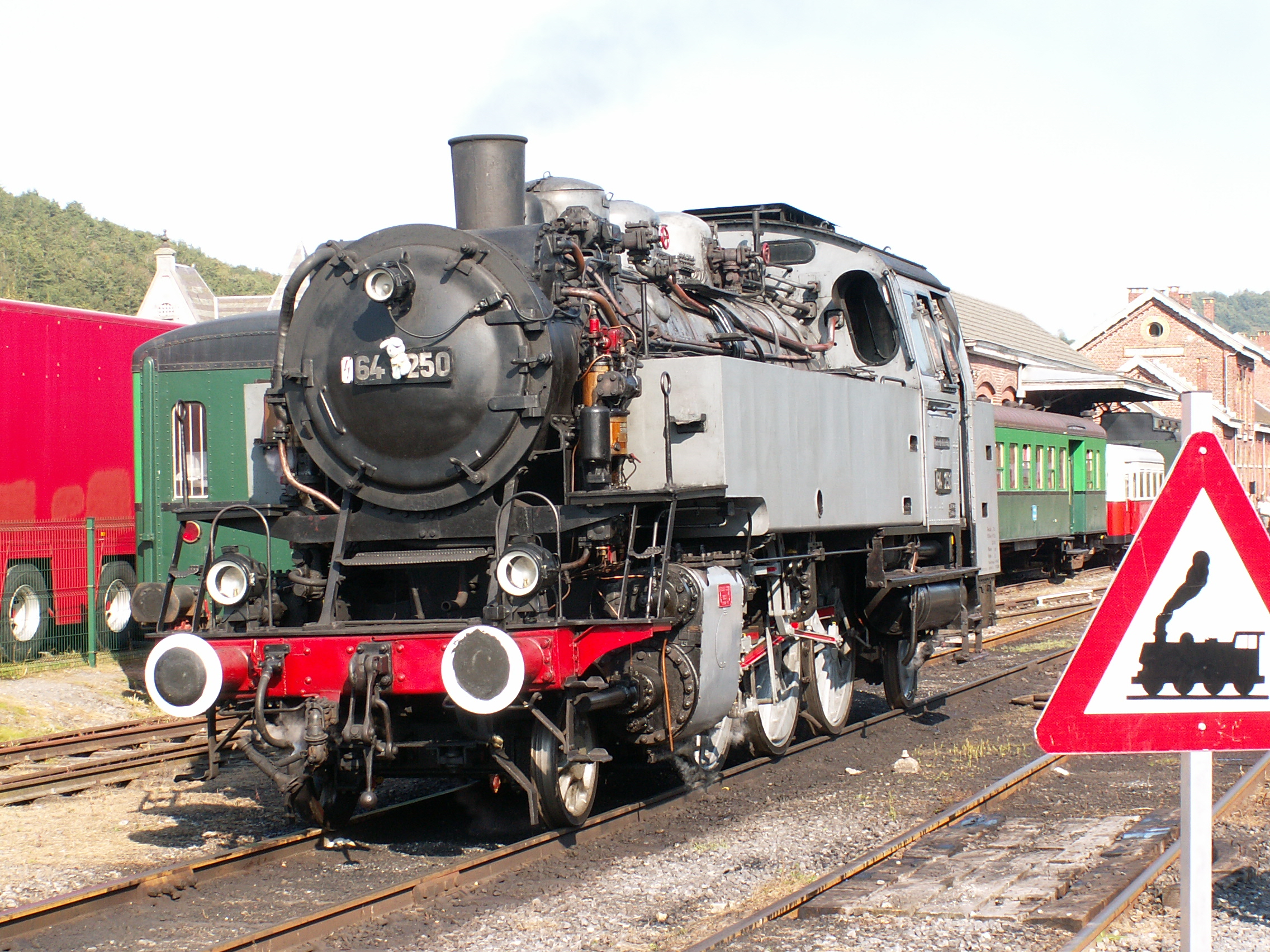
No. 64 250 at Treignes in 2011

While the majority of the class 64s are preserved in Germany, seven of the class are preserved in other countries.

- 64 250 with the Chemin de Fer à Vapeur des 3 Vallées in Mariembourg, Belgium
- 64 305 with the Bavarian Railway Museum in Germany and is currently awaiting overhaul.
- 64 344 with the Passau Railway Society (currently being renovated)
- 64 415 with the Veluwsche Stoomtrein Maatschappij in Beekbergen, Netherlands
- 64 419 with the DBK Historic Railway in Crailsheim
- 64 491 with the Dampfbahn Fränkische Schweiz in Ebermannstadt, Bavaria
- 64 518 with the Verein Historische Eisenbahn Emmental (VHE) in Huttwil, Switzerland
- 64 061 (Polish State Railways no. OKl2-6) in Jaworzyna Śląska, Poland

== See also ==
- Deutsche Reichsbahn
- List of DRG locomotives and railbuses
- Einheitsdampflokomotive for more about the DRG's standard steam locomotives.
