= DBK Historic Railway =

Preserved railway association in Crailsheim, Germany

Coordinates: 49.133°N 10.064°E

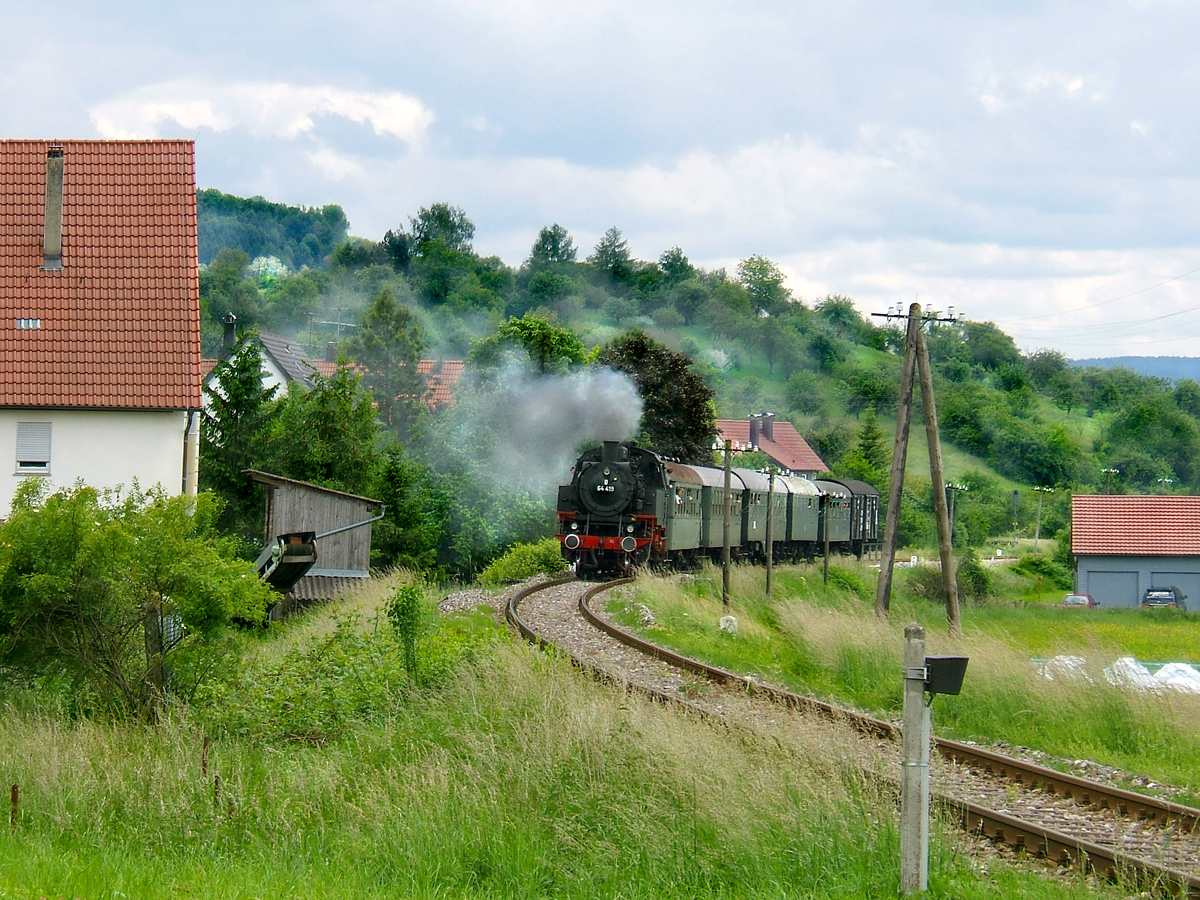
The DBK Historic Railway

DBK Historic Railway, Crailsheim, Baden-Württemberg

The DBK Historic Railway is a preserved railway association in Crailsheim, Germany.

Founded as the "Kocher Valley Steam Railway" (Dampfbahn Kochertal) in 1985 at Sulzbach-Laufen, it moved gradually into the former steam engine locomotive depot (Bahnbetriebswerk or Bw) at Crailsheim. In May 2006, there were over 100 members. The museum has many railway vehicles, some of which are operational, including steam locomotives and diesel locomotives as well as passenger coaches and goods wagons. These include a working DRG Class 64 tank engine, no. 64 419, a DRB Class 50 wartime tender locomotive (not operational), no. 50 3545, and a DB Class V 100 diesel, no. 212 084.

It also offers special trips in historic trains between Schorndorf and Rudersberg.

A major project, which has been undertaken with state aid, is the rebuilding of a turntable in the marshalling yard at Crailsheim station.
