= Hannoversches Straßenbahn Museum =

Collection of tram cars

Coordinates: 52°17′27″N 9°55′56″E

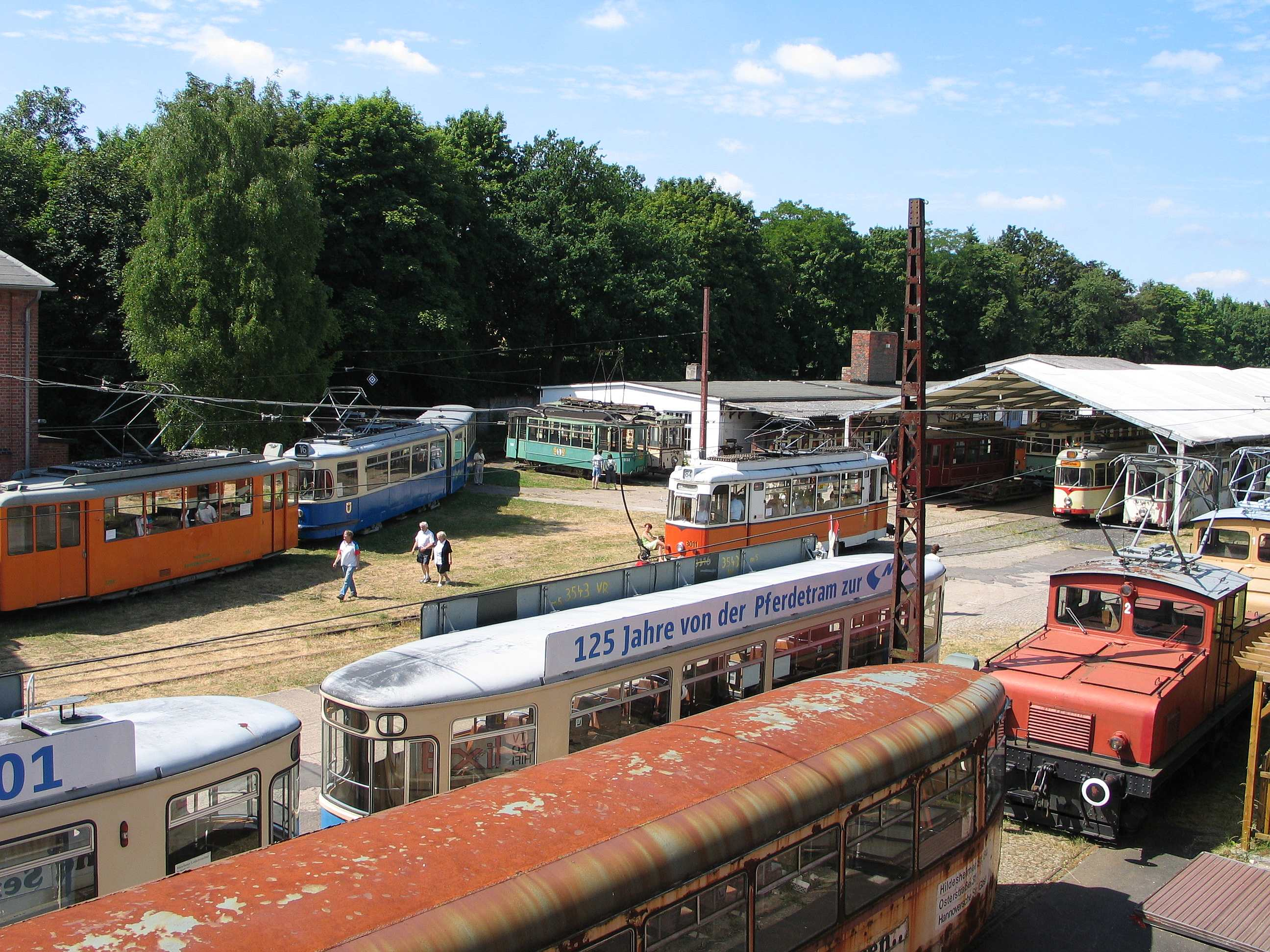

Hannoversches Straßenbahn Museum

Hannoversches Straßenbahn-Museum or Hanover Tramway Museum comprises a collection of tramcars from all over Germany, and is located on the site of a former potash mine in Sehnde, southeast of the city of Hanover.
