= Nordhalben =

- Municipality
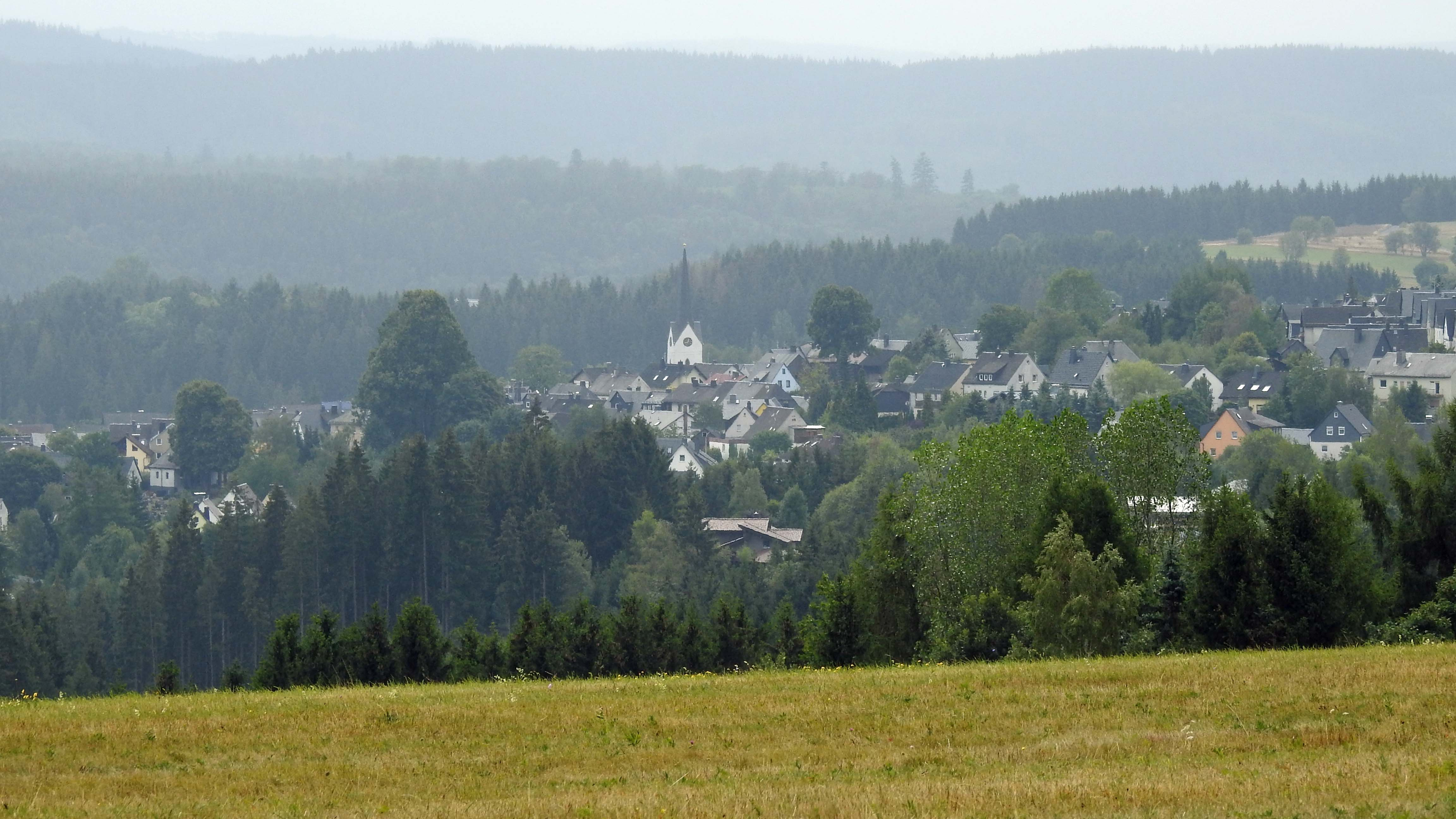
- Nordhalben seen from the north

- Coat of arms

- Location of Nordhalben within Kronach district
- Interactive map of Nordhalben
- Location within Germany Location within Bavaria
- Coordinates: 50°22′25″N 11°30′40″E
- Country: Germany
- State: Bavaria
- Admin. region: Oberfranken
- District: Kronach
- Subdivisions: 8 Ortsteile

Government
  - Mayor (2020–26): Michael Pöhnlein (FW)

Area
  - Total: 21.92 km^{2} (8.46 sq mi)
- Elevation: 586 m (1,923 ft)

Population (2025-12-31)
  - Total: 1,474
  - Density: 67.24/km^{2} (174.2/sq mi)
- Time zone: UTC+01:00 (CET)
  - Summer (DST): UTC+02:00 (CEST)
- Postal codes: 96365
- Dialling codes: 09267
- Vehicle registration: KC
- Website: www.nordhalben.de

Nordhalben is a municipality in the district of Kronach in Bavaria in Germany.
