= Steinwiesen =

- Municipality
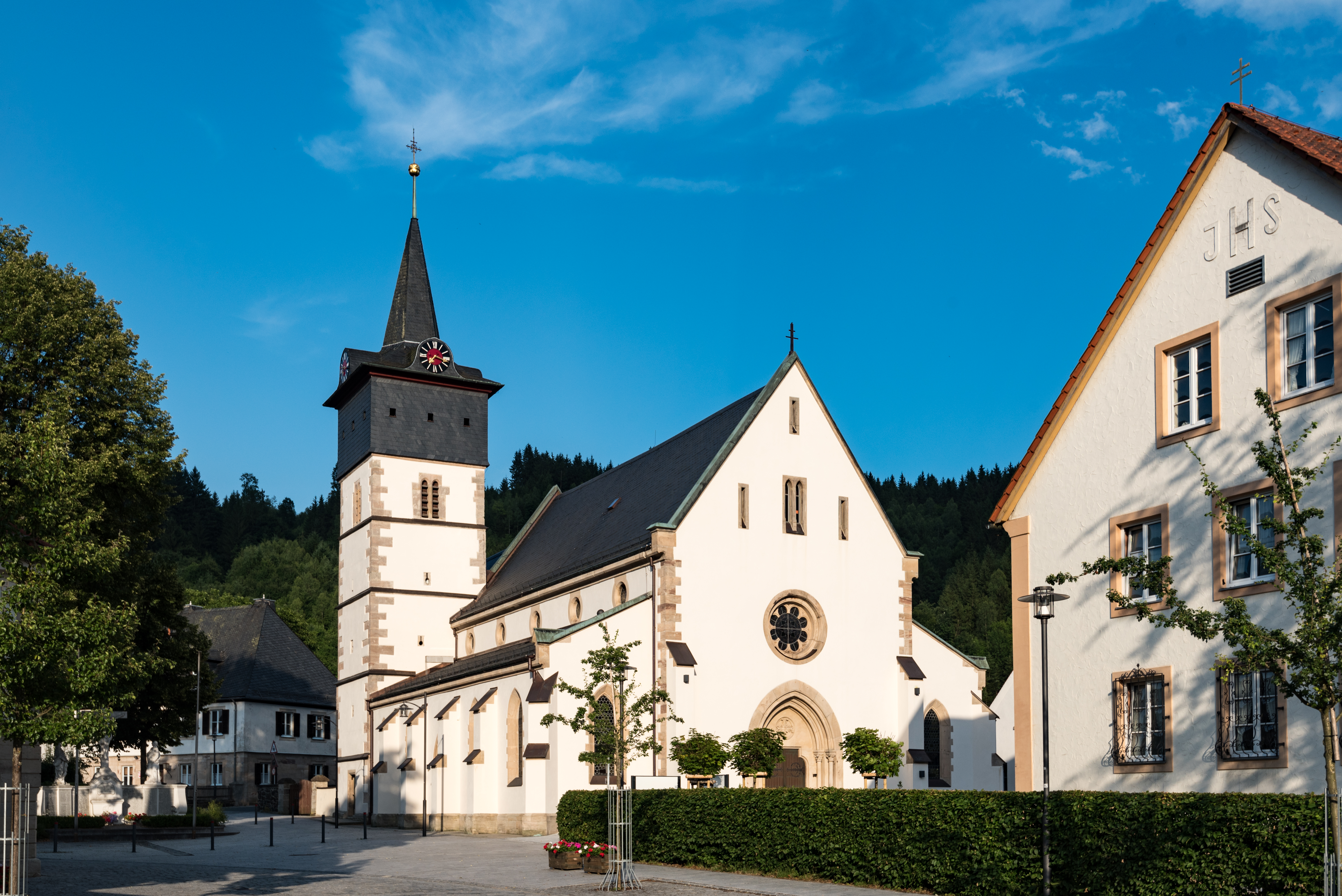
- Church of Virgin Mary

- Coat of arms

- Location of Steinwiesen within Kronach district
- Interactive map of Steinwiesen
- Location within Germany Location within Bavaria
- Coordinates: 50°17′39″N 11°27′43″E
- Country: Germany
- State: Bavaria
- Admin. region: Oberfranken
- District: Kronach
- Subdivisions: 5 Ortsteile

Government
  - Mayor (2020–26): Gerhard Wunder (CSU)

Area
  - Total: 55.08 km^{2} (21.27 sq mi)
- Elevation: 374 m (1,227 ft)

Population (2025-12-31)
  - Total: 3,250
  - Density: 59.0/km^{2} (153/sq mi)
- Time zone: UTC+01:00 (CET)
  - Summer (DST): UTC+02:00 (CEST)
- Postal codes: 96349
- Dialling codes: 09262 in Teilen: 09260, 09267
- Vehicle registration: KC
- Website: www.steinwiesen.de

Steinwiesen is a market town and municipality located in the Upper Franconian district of Kronach, in Bavaria, Germany. The town is situated about 100 km slightly east of due north of Nuremberg, and approximately 10 km northeast of Kronach. The main town is located in a valley, within the Franconian Forest Nature Park, and is known for its particularly scenic surroundings.

== History ==
Steinwiesen is thought to have been founded in 1000 AD, and was first mentioned under the name 'Steinnigenwiesen' in Urbar A of the Bamberg Collegiate Diocese in 1323 as part of a list of possessions and interests. Steinnigenwiesen held 9.5 fiefs and a mill. The name is derived from a translation referred to as a 'stony meadows'. In 1348, 'Steinwisen' was mentioned for the first time in Urbar B.

In 1386 'Steinwiesen' is mentioned in a document as the first rafting village in Frankenwald (en: the Franconian forest). The oldest document in the possession of the community officially dates back to 1419, a fief letter from Bishop Albrecht von Wetheim for Cuntz Weydhawser concerning the tithe to Steinwiesen. The Kronach Kastenamts-Urbar of 1507 listed 45 houses and 7 cutting mills. These were the lower cutting mill at the Silberberg, at the Hader, the Schöpfenmühl, the upper grinding mill, the mill at the Steingründlein, Hirtensteg, and Wolfsgrube. At that time, the lords of the village were the Hochstift, Heinz von Redwitz, who owned five estates, and the Marschall von Ebneth with two estates.

Between 1653 and 1674, the village was hit by the plague on five occasions.

Steinwiesen was granted market privileges in April 1743 through Friedrich Karl von Schönborn-Buchheim, bishop to Bamberg and Würzburg. The town remained within the Bishopric of Bamberg until 1802.

With the directive of April 1937, the governor of Bavaria, knight Franz of Epp lent the community of Steinwiesen the right to lead an own crest. The community flag with three strips in the sequence red-white-green was approved 1968 by the Bavarian Interior Ministry.

== Notable people ==
- Josef Müller, German Resistance member and founder of the Christian Social Union in Bavaria
