= DB Class 10 =

Class of 2 West German 4-6-2 locomotives

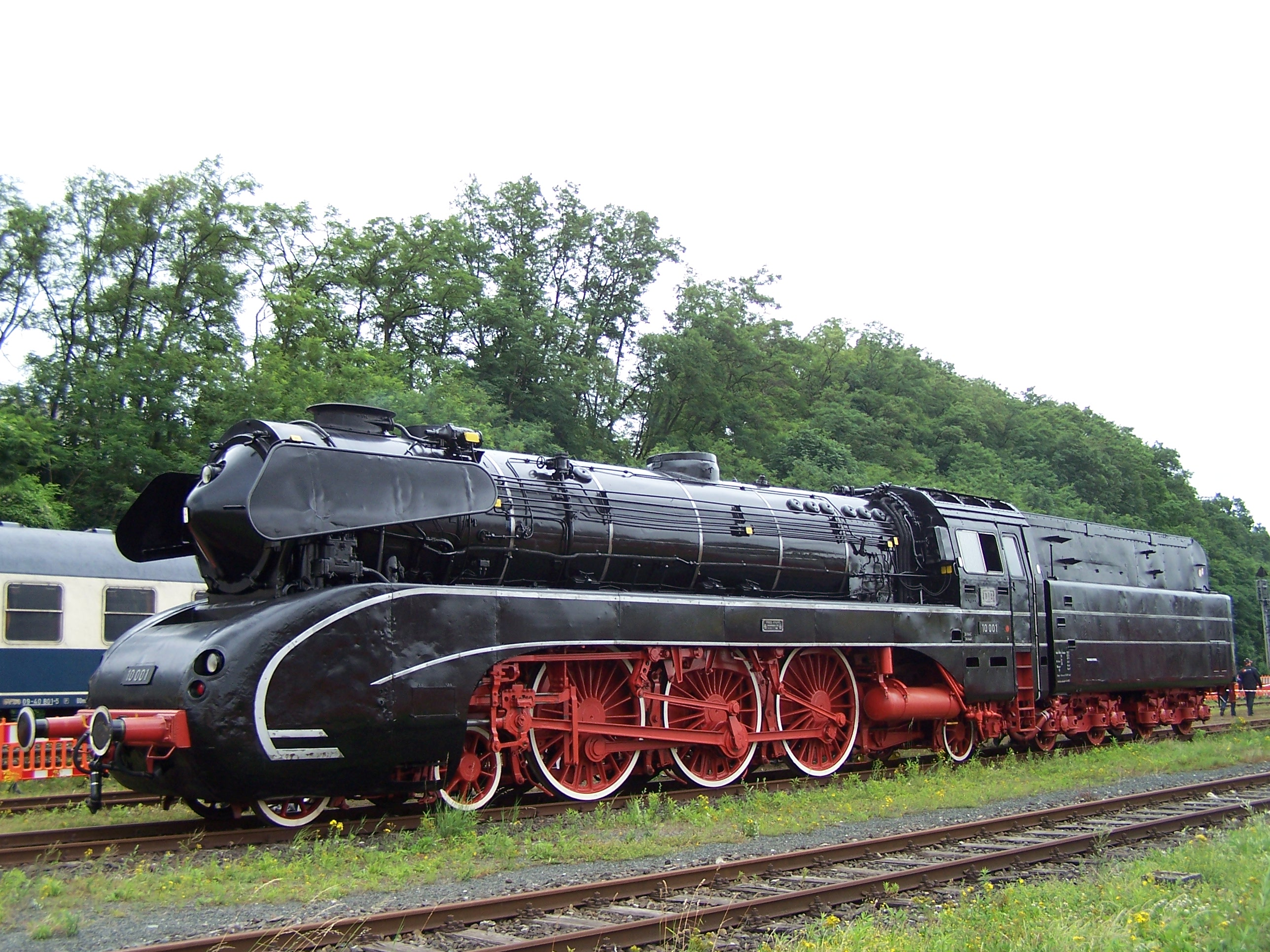
- 10 001 on display at the German Steam Locomotive Museum
Type and origin
- Power type: Steam
- Builder: Krupp
- Serial number: 3351–3352
- Build date: 1957
- Total produced: 2
Specifications
- Configuration
  - Whyte: 4-6-2
  - UIC: 2′C1′ h3
  - German: S 36.22
- Driver: Divided: inner on 1st, outer on 2nd
- Gauge: 1,435 mm (4 ft 8 1/2 in)
- Leading dia.: 1,000 mm (3 ft 3 3/8 in)
- Driver dia.: 2,000 mm (6 ft 6 3/4 in)
- Trailing dia.: 1,000 mm (3 ft 3 3/8 in)
- Tender wheels: 1,000 mm (3 ft 3 3/8 in)
- Wheelbase
  - Axle spacing (Asymmetrical): 2,250 mm (7 ft 4 5/8 in) +; 1,875 mm (6 ft 1 7/8 in) +; 2,300 mm (7 ft 6 1/2 in) +; 2,300 mm (7 ft 6 1/2 in) +; 3,800 mm (12 ft 5 5/8 in) =
  - Engine: 12,525 mm (41 ft 1 1/8 in)
  - Tender: 2,100 mm (6 ft 10 5/8 in) +; 2,400 mm (7 ft 10 1/2 in) +; 2,100 mm (6 ft 10 5/8 in) =; 6,600 mm (21 ft 7 7/8 in)
  - incl. tender: 22,185 mm (72 ft 9 3/8 in)
- Length
  - Over headstocks: 25,155 mm (82 ft 6 3/8 in)
  - Over buffers: 26,503 mm (86 ft 11 3/8 in)
- Height: 4,550 mm (14 ft 11 1/8 in)
- Axle load: 21.9 tonnes (21.6 long tons; 24.1 short tons)
- Adhesive weight: 65.6 tonnes (64.6 long tons; 72.3 short tons)
- Empty weight: 108.9 tonnes (107.2 long tons; 120.0 short tons)
- Service weight: 118.9 tonnes (117.0 long tons; 131.1 short tons)
- Tender type: 2′2′ T 40
- Fuel type: 001: Coal/oil; 002: Oil
- Fuel capacity: 001: 9 tonnes (8.9 long tons; 9.9 short tons) of coal, 4.5 m^{3} (990 imp gal; 1,200 US gal) of oil; 002: 12.5 m^{3} (2,700 imp gal; 3,300 US gal) of oil
- Water cap.: 40 m^{3} (8,800 imp gal; 11,000 US gal)
- Firebox
  - Grate area: 3.96 m^{2} (42.6 sq ft)
- Boiler
  - Pitch: 3,250 mm (10 ft 8 in)
  - Tube plates: 5,500 mm (18 ft 1/2 in)
  - Small tubes: 54 mm (2 1/8 in), 109 off
  - Large tubes: 143 mm (5 5/8 in), 44 off
- Boiler pressure: 18 bar (18.4 kgf/cm^{2}; 261 psi)
- Heating surface
  - Firebox: 22.0 m^{2} (237 sq ft)
  - Tubes: 92.30 m^{2} (993.5 sq ft)
  - Flues: 102.10 m^{2} (1,099.0 sq ft)
  - Total surface: 216.40 m^{2} (2,329.3 sq ft)
- Superheater
  - Heating area: 105.70 m^{2} (1,137.7 sq ft)
- Cylinders: Three
- Cylinder size: 480 mm × 720 mm (18 7/8 in × 28 3/8 in)
- Valve gear: Heusinger (Walschaerts)
- Valve type: Piston Valve
- Train heating: Steam
- Loco brake: Railway air brake
- Train brakes: Compressed-air brake
- Couplers: Screw Link
Performance figures
- Maximum speed: Forwards: 140 km/h (87 mph); Backwards: 90 km/h (56 mph)
- Indicated power: 2,500 PS (1,840 kW; 2,470 hp)
Career
- Operators: Deutsche Bundesbahn
- Numbers: 10 001 – 10 002
- Retired: 1968

The steam locomotives of DB Class 10 were express locomotives with the Deutsche Bundesbahn in Germany after the Second World War. They were nicknamed 'Black Swans' ('schwarze Schwäne') as a result of their elegant shape.

== History ==
These newly designed locomotives were built by the firm of Krupp and delivered to the DB in 1957. The two examples of this class were given operating numbers 10 001 and 10 002. They had originally been seen as a replacement for the DRG Class 01 and Class 01.10. However, as a result of their late delivery, high axle load of over 22 tonnes (which restricted its use to only a few routes) and structural changes to rail operations, this plan did not come to fruition. Both engines were designed to greatly reduce maintenance and repair costs. They had a conical smokebox door and partial streamlining which protected the cylinders from dirt and from cooling too rapidly and, at the same time, was supposed to reduce wind resistance. The fully welded boiler was the same as the newly designed one used to re-equip the DRG Class 01.10 from 1953.

The two engines differed initially in their firing. Number 10 001 only had supplementary oil-firing to start with, thus relieving the stoker of up to 30% of his work, but was later converted so that it was fully oil-fired, as 10 002 had been from the outset.

Both vehicles were equipped with a newly designed tender of Class 2′2′ T 40.

Locomotives 10 001 and 10 002 were only permitted to work on certain main lines as heavy express steam locomotives due to their axle load of 22 tonnes. Up to 1962 they were allocated to Bebra locomotive depot (Bahnbetriebswerk or Bw), before being transferred to Bw Kassel where they worked alongside the DRG Class 01.10s until 20 March 1967 heading fast-stopping and express trains to and from Gießen. Number 10 001 hauled the E 387/388 (E 687/688) fast-stopping services to and from Münster almost without a break from 21 March 1967 to the beginning of January 1968, and for one month even had special permission to continue as far as Rheine (which part of the route was only cleared for 20 tonne axle loads).

Locomotive 10 002 was retired after a side rod broke in January 1967 and number 10 001 was retired on 27 June 1968.

No. 10 001 may be viewed at the German Steam Locomotive Museum (Deutsche Dampflokomotiv-Museum) in Neuenmarkt-Wirsberg. No. 10 002 was scrapped in 1972 at the Offenburg repair shop (Ausbesserungswerk or Aw).

The Class 10 was generally well-liked, especially by the staff at Kassel depot. Contrary to the claim commonly made in the literature that she was prone to damage, its long periods out of service were because spare parts were never available locally, unlike those of the Class 01.

== In fiction ==
In the 2016 Thomas & Friends film The Great Race, a character named Frieda is based on the DB Class 10.

== See also ==
- List of preserved steam locomotives in Germany

== Literature ==
- Ebel, Jürgen-Ulrich. Baureihe 10. Die stärkste deutsche Schnellzugdampflok. In: Eisenbahn-Kurier. No. 306/Year 32/1998. EK-Verlag GmbH, ISSN 0170-5288, pp. 28–32.
- Ebel, Jürgen-Ulrich. "Die Baureihe 10"; EK-Verlag, Freiburg, 1998, ISBN 978-3-88255-101-3
- Hütter, Ingo (2009). Die Dampflokomotiven der Baureihen 01 bis 45 der DRG, DRB, DB, und DR (in German). Werl: DGEG Medien. p. 97. ISBN 978-3-937189-45-1.
- Ransome-Wallis, P. (2001) [1959]. Illustrated Encyclopedia of World Railway Locomotives. Dover Publications, Inc. ISBN 0-486-41247-4.
- Weisbrod, Manfred; Müller, Hans; Petznik, Wolfgang (1976). Dampflokomotiven deutscher Eisenbahnen, Baureihe 01–39 (EFA 1.1) (in German) (3rd ed.). Düsseldorf: Alba Buchverlag. pp. 72–74. ISBN 3-87094-081-6.
