= Inclined plane (disambiguation) =

An inclined plane is a physical structure which uses a difference in height to gain a mechanical advantage.

Inclined plane may also refer to:

- Canal inclined plane, application of the method to a canal interchange
- Inclined plane railroad, funicular, or cable railway
- Design feature applied on some fixed-wing aircraft
- ‘’Schiefe Ebene’’, specific stretch of German railway with a severe gradient (in Upper Franconia, a.k.a. ’’Oberfranken’’)
