= Class 95 =

Class 95 may refer to:

- Class 95 (radio station), a Singaporean radio station owned by Mediacorp
- DRG Class 96, a class of German, passenger train, tank locomotives with a 2-10-2 wheel arrangement operated by the Deutsche Reichsbahn or its successor administrations and comprising:
- Class 95.0: Prussian T 20
- Class 95.1: BBÖ Class 82
- Class 95.2: ČSD Class 524.1
- Class 95.3: PKP Class OKz 32
- Class 95.66: HBE Animal Class
