= DRB Class 01.10 =

Class of german 4-6-2 steam locomotives

DRB Class 01.10 DB Class 011, 012
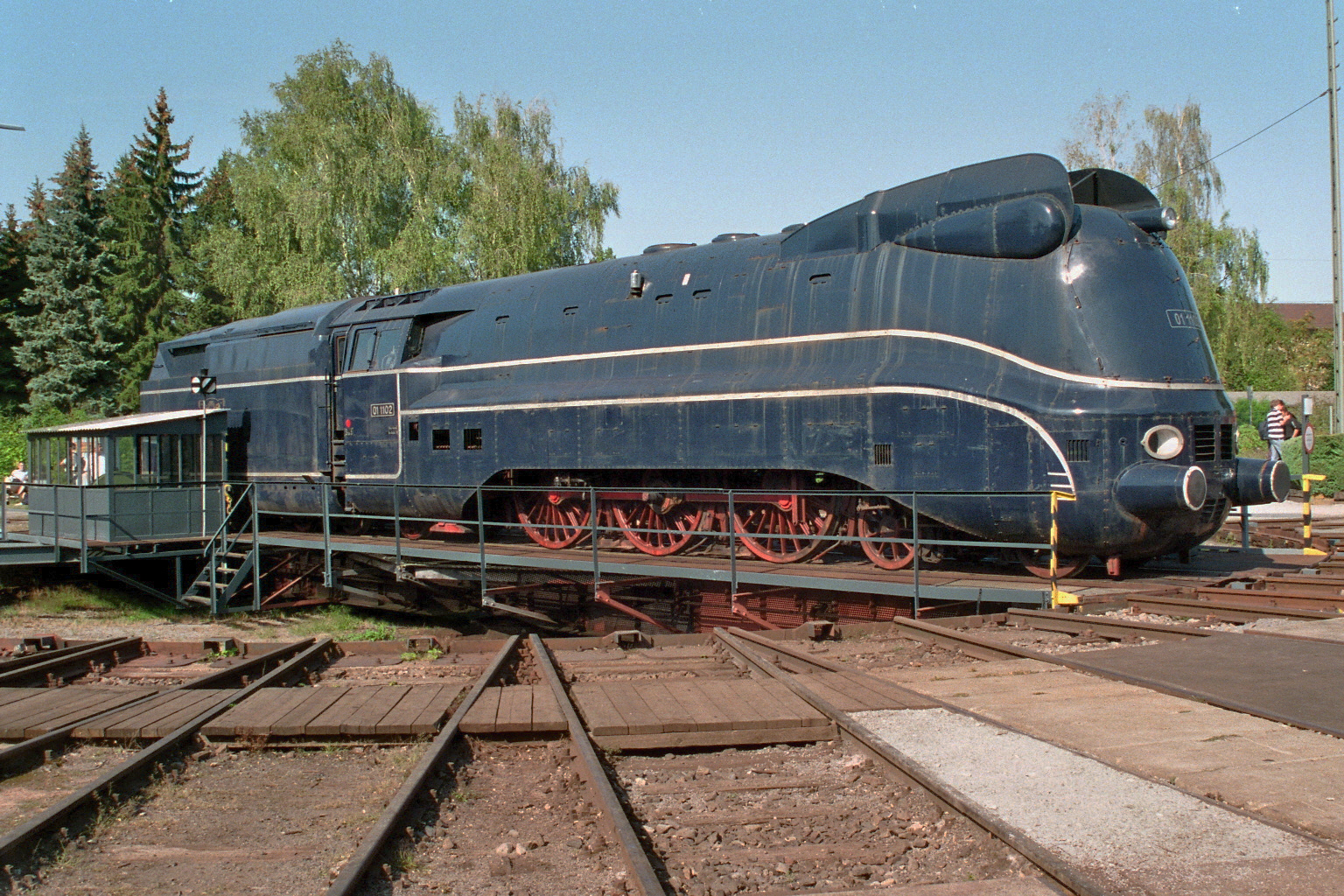
- Preserved 01 1102 with restored streamlining
Type and origin
- Power type: Steam
- Builder: Berliner Maschinenbau
- Serial number: 11000, 11308–11361
- Build date: 1939–1940
- Total produced: 55
Specifications
- Configuration
  - Whyte: 4-6-2
  - UIC: 2′C1′ h3
  - German: S 36.20
- Driver: Divided: inside cylinder on 1st, outside cylinders on 2nd
- Gauge: 1,435 mm (4 ft 8 1/2 in)
- Leading dia.: 1,000 mm (3 ft 3 3/8 in)
- Driver dia.: 2,000 mm (6 ft 6 3/4 in)
- Trailing dia.: 1,250 mm (4 ft 1 1/4 in)
- Tender wheels: 1,000 mm (3 ft 3 3/8 in)
- Wheelbase
  - Axle spacing (Asymmetrical): 2,200 mm (7 ft 2 5/8 in) +; 1,800 mm (5 ft 10 7/8 in) +; 2,300 mm (7 ft 6 1/2 in) +; 2,300 mm (7 ft 6 1/2 in) +; 3,800 mm (12 ft 5 5/8 in)
  - Engine: 12,400 mm (40 ft 8 1/4 in)
  - Tender: 6,000 mm (19 ft 8 1/4 in)
  - incl. tender: 20,370 mm (66 ft 10 in)
- Length
  - Over headstocks: 22,830 mm (74 ft 10 3/4 in)
  - Over buffers: 24,130 mm (79 ft 2 in)
- Axle load: 20.1 tonnes (19.8 long tons; 22.2 short tons)
- Adhesive weight: 60.2 tonnes (59.2 long tons; 66.4 short tons)
- Empty weight: 103.1 tonnes (101.5 long tons; 113.6 short tons)
- Service weight: 114.3 tonnes (112.5 long tons; 126.0 short tons)
- Tender type: 2′3 T 38
- Fuel capacity: 10.0 tonnes (9.8 long tons; 11.0 short tons) coal or 13,500 L (2,970 imp gal; 3,570 US gal) fuel oil
- Water cap.: 38.0 m^{3} (8,400 imp gal; 10,000 US gal)
- Firebox
  - Grate area: 4.32 m^{2} (46.5 sq ft)
- Boiler
  - Tube plates: 6,800 mm (267 11/16 in)
  - Small tubes: 70 mm (2 3/4 in), 106 off
  - Large tubes: 171 mm (6 3/4 in), 24 off
- Boiler pressure: 16 bar (16.3 kgf/cm^{2}; 232 psi)
- Heating surface
  - Firebox: 16.9 m^{2} (182 sq ft)
  - Tubes: 147 m^{2} (1,580 sq ft)
  - Flues: 83 m^{2} (890 sq ft)
  - Total surface: 246.9 m^{2} (2,658 sq ft)
- Cylinders: Three
- Cylinder size: 500 mm × 660 mm (19 11/16 in × 26 in)
- Valve gear: Walschaerts (Heusinger)
- Loco brake: Knorr, single-chamber, compressed air brakes acting on both sides of coupled wheels + compressed air quick-acting brakes on driving and tender wheels
Performance figures
- Maximum speed: Forwards: 150 or 140 km/h (93 or 87 mph); Reverse: 50 km/h (31 mph)
- Indicated power: 1,559 kW (2,120 PS; 2,090 hp); 1,728 kW (2,350 PS; 2,320 hp) (coal, with Austausch boiler); 1,817 kW (2,470 PS; 2,440 hp) (oil, with Austausch boiler)
Career
- Numbers: DRG: 01 1001, 01 1052 – 01 1105; DB (from 1968): 011 062-7 ... 011 099-9, 012 001-4, 012 052-7 ... 012 105-3
- Retired: 1975
- Disposition: 10 preserved, remainder scrapped

01 1066 climbing the Schiefe Ebene (37 MB)

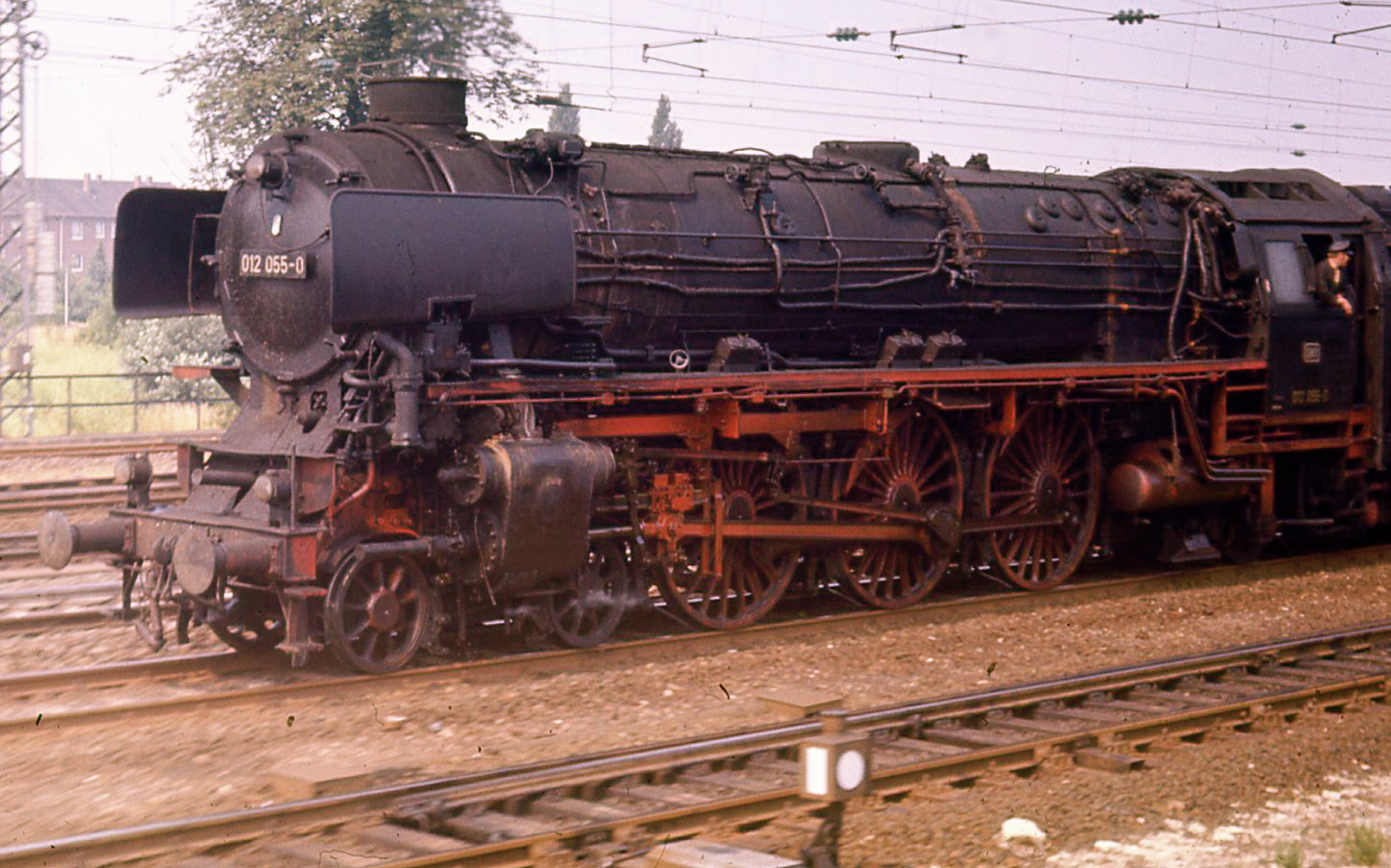
012 055-0 light engine at Rheine, August 1973

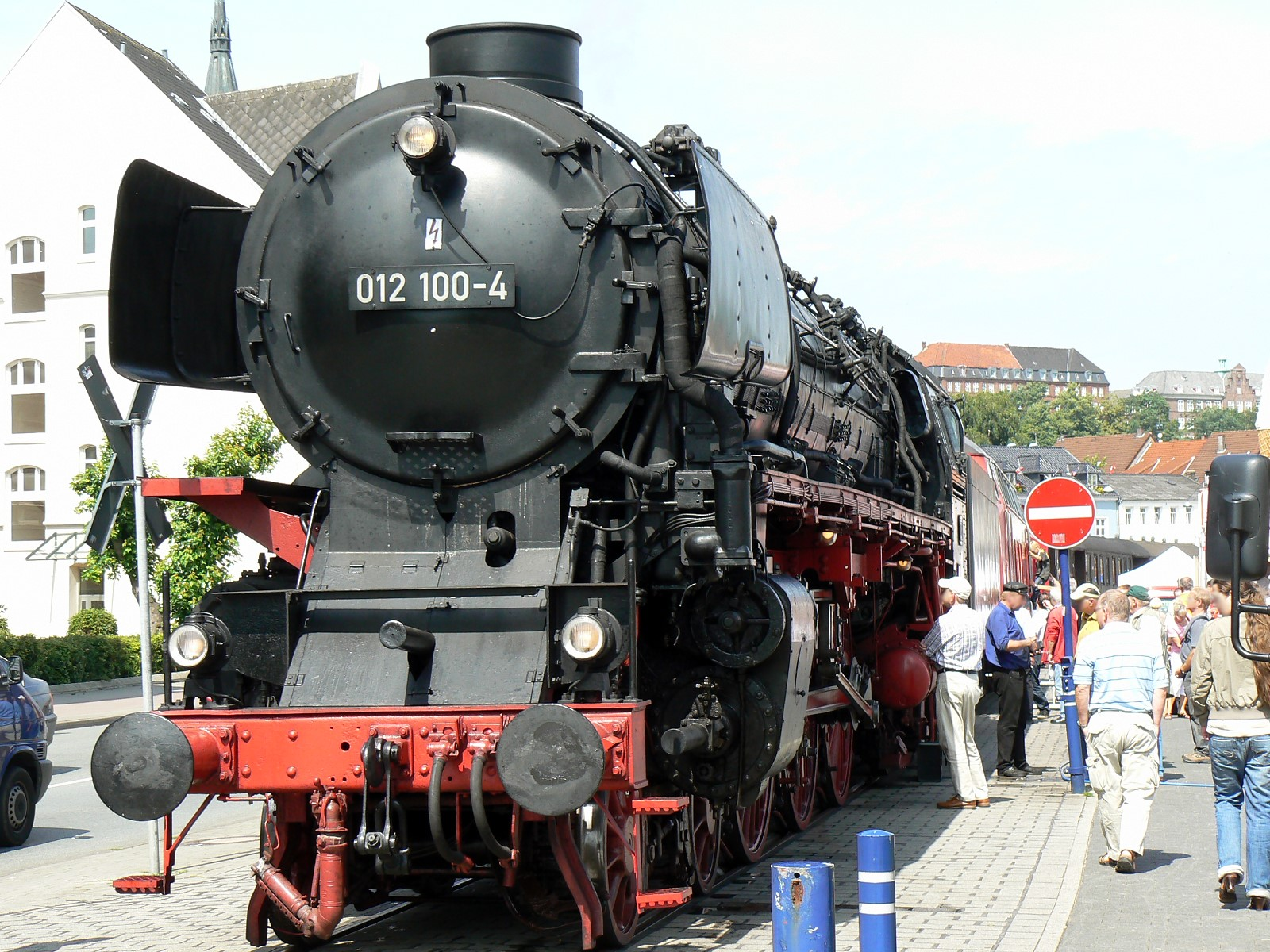
Preserved 012 100-4 (aka 01 1100) at Flensburg, 2007.

The Deutsche Reichsbahn Class 01.10 was a series of express steam locomotives. Developed at the end of the 1930s it was part of the standard locomotive programme (Einheitsdampflokomotiven). Modernized in the 1950s, the class lasted almost until the end of steam operation at the West German Deutsche Bundesbahn (DB).

== History ==
With the introduction of high speed services on an increasing number of lines Deutsche Reichsbahn required powerful express steam locomotives. A top speed of 150 km/h and of hauling trains of 500 tonnes at 120 km/h was desired, as well as possibility of hauling trains of 350 tonnes at 100 km/h up a 5 ‰ inclines. This was more than the existing Class 01 and 03 two-cylinder engines could cope with, having no sufficient power reserves and rough riding qualities at higher speeds. Hence, the 01.10 was designed with a three-cylinder layout. Furthermore, they were equipped with a streamlined casing to reduce air resistance. Frictional losses were minimized by the use of roller bearings on the driving and coupling rods.

Out of a projected requirement for 400 locomotives, 204 were initially ordered in 1939 from all major German locomotive manufacturers. However, as a result of the Second World War only 55 were eventually delivered, all of which came from Berliner Maschinenbau.

The Class 01.10 was delivered to the following locomotive sheds (Bahnbetriebswerke): Leipzig Hbf West, Berlin Anhalter Bahnhof, Halle, Hamburg-Altona, Hannover-Ost, Bebra, Erfurt P, Dresden-Altstadt, Frankfurt/Oder Pbf Würzburg and Munich as well as the Grunewald Locomotive Research Office. During the war, some of the locomotives were transferred to Breslau and Kattowitz.

In 1944 all engines of the class were moved to western Germany due to the course of the war.

After the Second World War the engines were in a pitiful state. Parts of their streamlined claddings were missing and the boilers, made of steel that was not age-resistant, showed signs of fatigue. On 20 June 1945 the entire class was temporarily withdrawn, having run less than 500,000 km. However, as a result of the post-war locomotive shortage, the class was partially reprieved and several engines with minor damages were overhauled. The majority of engines remained sidelined until 1949. In that year it was decided that all but one locomotives (the finally retired 01 1067), should be refurbished. The streamlined casings were completely removed and Witte smoke deflectors fitted. The new front view looked unusual for a German steam engine with the smokebox door being cut off in the upper third to provide space for the retained feedwater heater. Only two engines were provided with the usual circular smokebox door.

However, the problem of the boiler being made of non-durable St 47 K steel remained. Because the engines were by far too young to be written off, they received all-new welded high-performance boilers. These were built by Henschel of Kassel between 1953 and 1956 and installed at the Brunswick maintenance works, along with a mixing preheater system.

Additionally in 1956 engine 01 1100 received an oil-firing, enhancing its performance considerably. Oil-firing allows for a better control of the grate and could be more easily adapted to respective operating conditions. The engines were therefore more economical than coal-fired locomotives. Working conditions for firemen were also improved. Fuel oil, then available as a waste product, was used for firing. Following their positive experience with 01 1100, the DB decided in 1957 to convert another 33 locomotives of this class to oil-firing.

In 1968, as part of a renumbering scheme to conform with electronic data processing (EDP), the remaining coal-fired locomotives were given the class designation 011 while the oil-fired engines were now class 012.

The locomotives were used on all important main lines until electrification, for example on the Würzburg–Hamburg or Hamm–Hamburg routes. Towards the end they were deployed on the Hamburg–Westerland and Rheine–Norddeich lines.

On 31 May 1975, the remaining engines from Rheine shed ran the last scheduled services, being celebrated by a large number of railway enthusiasts. On 1 June 1975, a special ran from Rheine at 06:50 for the railway families to Emden. It was hauled by 012 061.

Table of withdrawals
Year	Coal-fired locomotives at start of year	Oil-fired locomotives at start of year	Quantity withdrawn	Locomotive numbers
1968	20	34	6	011 053/087/094/097, 012 079/089.
1969	16	32	8	011 069/078/083/086/090/096/097/099.
1970	8	32	4	011 070/093/098, 012 088.
1971	5	31	7	011 056/065/091, 012 057/059/076/085.
1972	2	27	10	011 072, 012 001/052/054/060/064/053/074/103/105.
1973	1	18	6	011 062, 012 058/071/084/092/102.
1974	0	13	5	012 068/077/082/101/104.
1975	0	8	8	012 055/061/063/066/075/080/081/100.

== Preserved locomotives ==
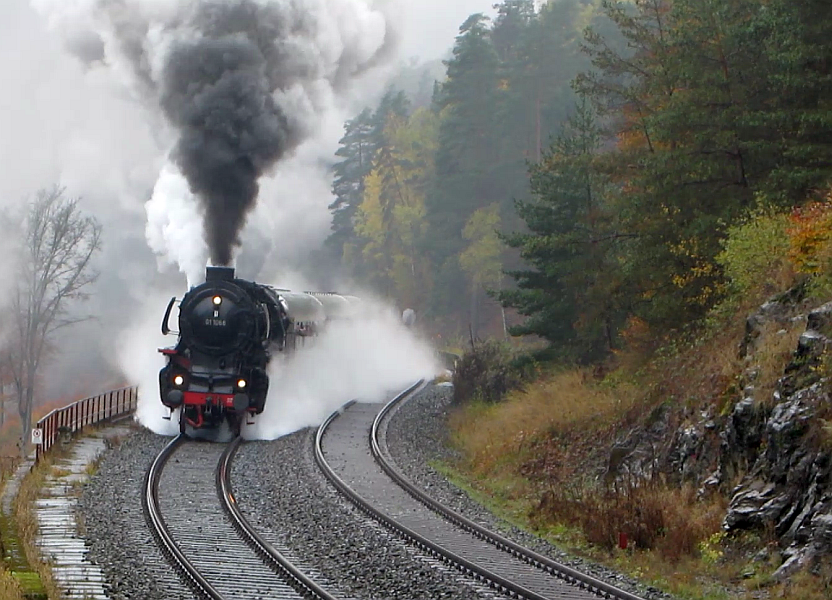
01 1066 climbing the Schiefe Ebene incline in November 2016. The engine has since been withdrawn.

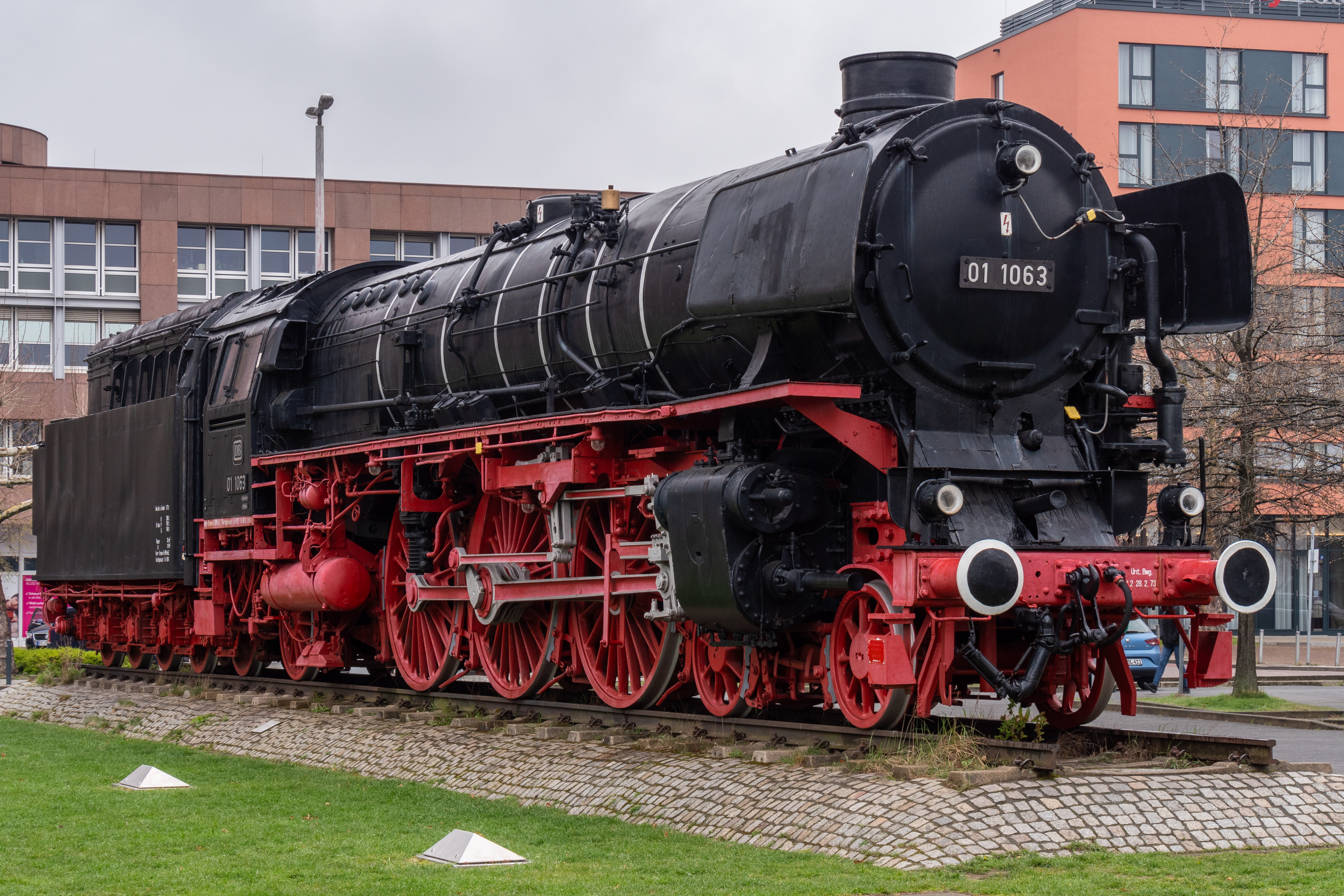
01 1063 in Braunschweig

Thanks to their relatively recent withdrawal from service, ten of these locomotives have been preserved.

As of October 2019 four Class 01.10 engines are on display at museums:

- 01 1056 is stored in the open at the Darmstadt-Kranichstein Railway Museum. It is the only surviving 01.10 engine that was never converted to oil firing.
- 01 1061 is on display at the German Steam Locomotive Museum in Neuenmarkt-Wirsberg.
- 01 1081 is being cosmetically restored at the South German Railway Museum.
- 01 1082 is part of the railway exhibition at the German Museum of Technology.

Please note: Only the museums at Berlin and Neuenmarkt-Wirsberg are open on a daily basis (except Mondays).

The other remaining engines are:

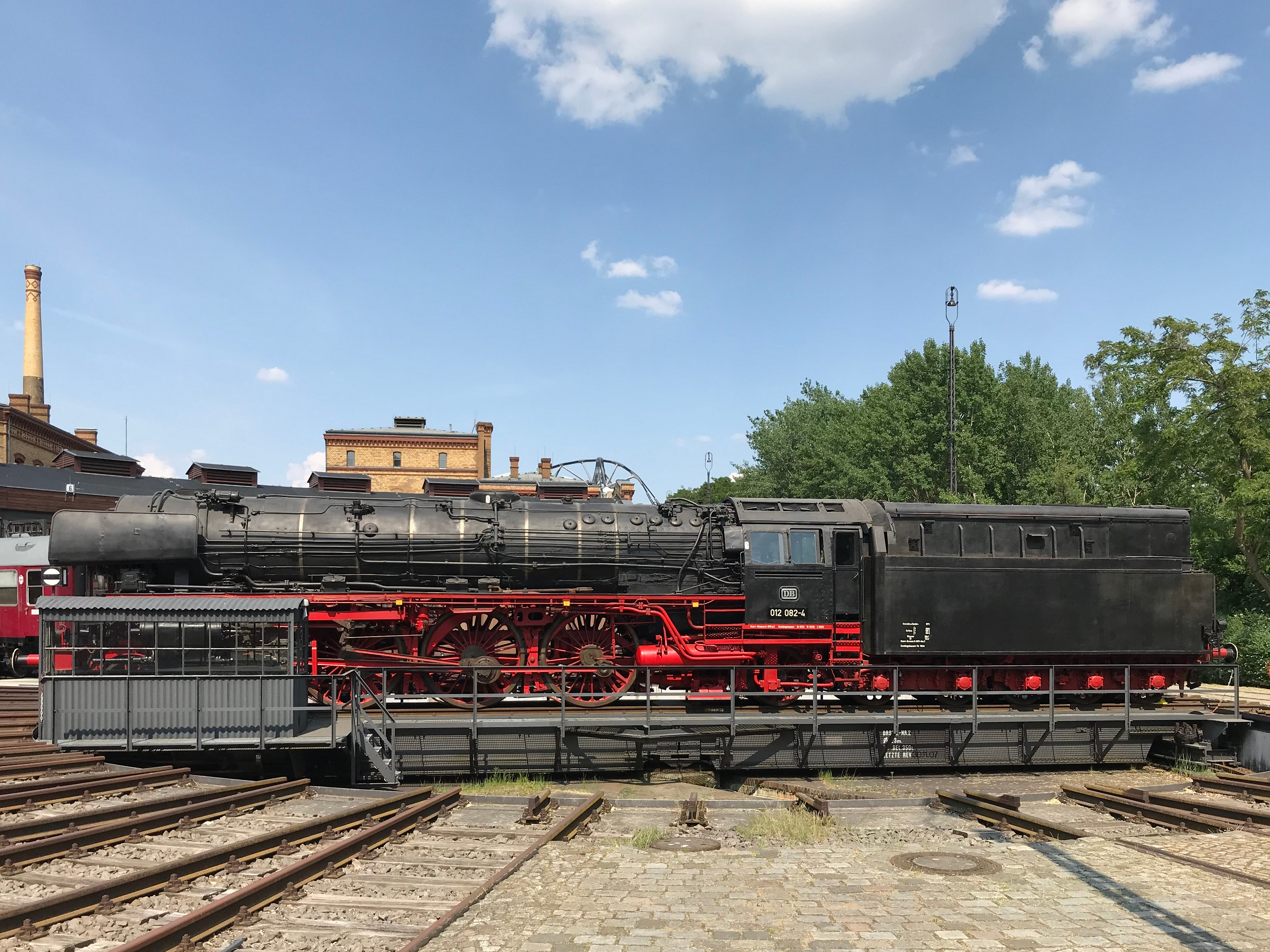
Preserved 012 082 (01 1082) on the turntable at the German Museum of Technology, May 2018.

- 01 1063 is plinthed near Braunschweig main station. Until the 1970s Braunschweig was the location of vast railway maintenance works, responsible for the 01.10 class.
- 01 1066 of the Ulm Railway Friends. It saw about 20 years of mainline heritage service but was withdrawn in 2016 for a major overhaul.
- 01 1075 is operational and based in Rotterdam (Netherlands), belonging to the Stoom Stichting Nederland. It was re-converted to coal-firing.
- 01 1100 belongs to the Deutsche Bahn AG. It was restored to working order for the 150th anniversary of German railways in 1985, but is currently stored "out of ticket" at Koblenz.
- 01 1102 is privately owned. In 1995 it was restored to operational condition at Meiningen Steam Locomotive Works. This included the recreation of the 1930s streamlined casing and a fictitious steel blue livery. It is out of service since 2004.
- 01 1104 was acquired by Steamtown Carnforth (UK) in 1975 and stored there until 1996. Subsequently, repatriated to Germany, it is likely to steam again in 2020.

== See also ==
- Deutsche Reichsbahn
- List of DRG locomotives and railbuses
