= Ulm Railway Society =

German railway society

UEF's 01 1066 climbing the Schiefe Ebene (37 MB)

The Ulm Railway Society (Ulmer Eisenbahnfreunde or UEF) is a German society for encouraging the preservation of historically valuable railway stock. It is based in the vicinity of Ulm, a city in the state of Baden-Württemberg in southern Germany. The society was founded in 1969, has about 600 members and around 12 steam locomotives as well as numerous historical wagons.

== Groups ==
The society is divided into four groups:

=== Narrow Gauge Group ===
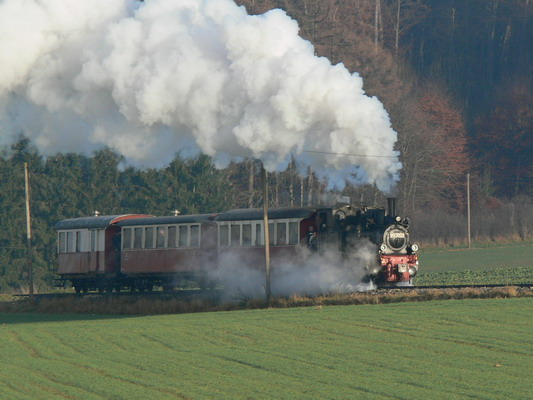
The Albbähnle just before Oppingen station

This group runs its own vehicles on the 5.7 kilometre long narrow gauge Amstetten–Laichingen railway from Amstetten to Oppingen, the so-called Albbähnle. Motive power is provided by locomotive 99 7203 and, from time to time, the diesel locomotive D8.

=== Branch Line Group ===
Historical branch line steam trains run on the society's own line from Amstetten to Gerstetten (Amstetten–Gerstetten branch line). Since mid-2006 they have been joined by the museum railbus, number T06. Occasionally goods trains are also worked. Steam locomotive 75 1118 hauls the historic steam trains. The Group (UEF Lokalbahn Amstetten-Gerstetten e. V.) owns other diesel locomotives and railbuses and historic branch line passenger coaches.

=== Ettlingen Group ===
The Albtal Transport Company (Albtal-Verkehrs-Gesellschaft) runs a historic fast stopping train (Eilzug) hauled by a DRG Class 58 (ex Baden G 12) steam engine on the Alb Valley Railway between Ettlingen and Bad Herrenalb and the Rhine Valley Railway and Murg Valley Railway between Karlsruhe and Baiersbronn. This historic engine was built in 1921 by the Maschinenbau-Gesellschaft Karlsruhe. Other steam locomotives also stationed with the Ettlingen Group, but not in working order, are a DRG Class 44, DRG Class 50 and DRG Class 86). The fast-stopping coaches were mainly built in the 1930s and modernised in the 1950s. The luggage vans homed at Ettlingen, which are usually used for the free transportation of bicycles, were used to carry the mortal remains of Frederick the Great from Hechingen to Potsdam.

=== Historical Steam Express Train Group ===
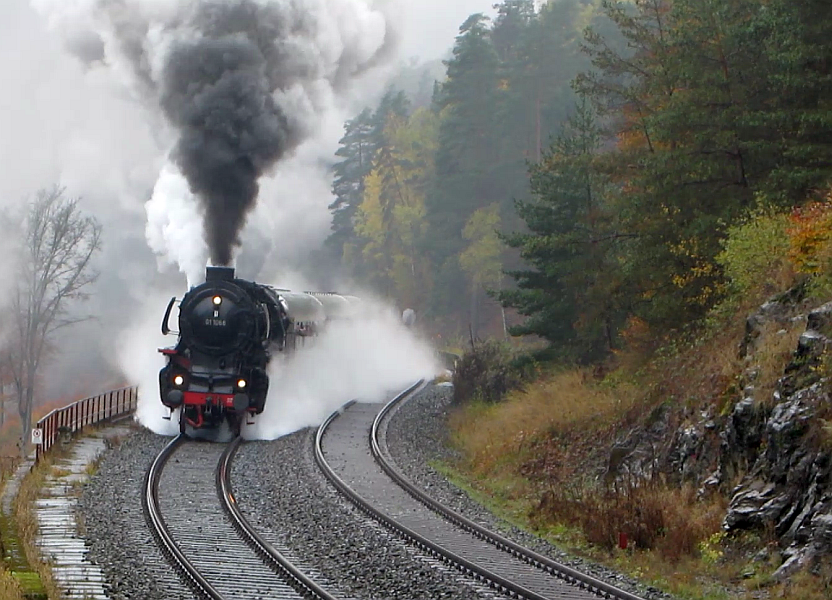
01 1066 climbing the Schiefe Ebene

This group maintains the most famous steam locomotives in the Ulmer Eisenbahnfreunde - 01 1066 and 01 509 - as well as historic, express train, 1st and 2nd class coaches. The vehicles were built between 1928 and 1954. The historic steam express - reinforced by express train coaches from the Passauer Eisenbahnfreunde - travels the length and breadth of Europe visiting, for example, Austria, Italy, France, Hungary, Sweden and Russia (Kaliningrad); albeit remaining mostly in south Germany. The express train steam locomotives and a working heating wagon are stationed at Heilbronn, the coaches in Stuttgart. The non-operational express train engine, number 01 1081, is being refurbished as a museum exhibit in the Augsburg Railway Park.

The services operated by the Ulmer Eisenbahnfreunde are regularly reported in the railway press and in TV programmes such as Eisenbahn-Romantik ('Railway Nostalgia').

== Railway Operations ==
All railway operations are carried out by volunteer members, from coach attendants to qualified engine drivers. This does not just involve running railway trips, but also the preparation and clearing up afterwards as well as restoration and repair wherever possible and permitted.

== Literature ==
- Sauter: Die Schnellzuglokomotiven der Ulmer Eisenbahnfreunde
