= German Steam Locomotive Museum =

Railway museum in Neuenmarkt, Bavaria, Germany

Coordinates: 50°5′38″N 11°34′57″E

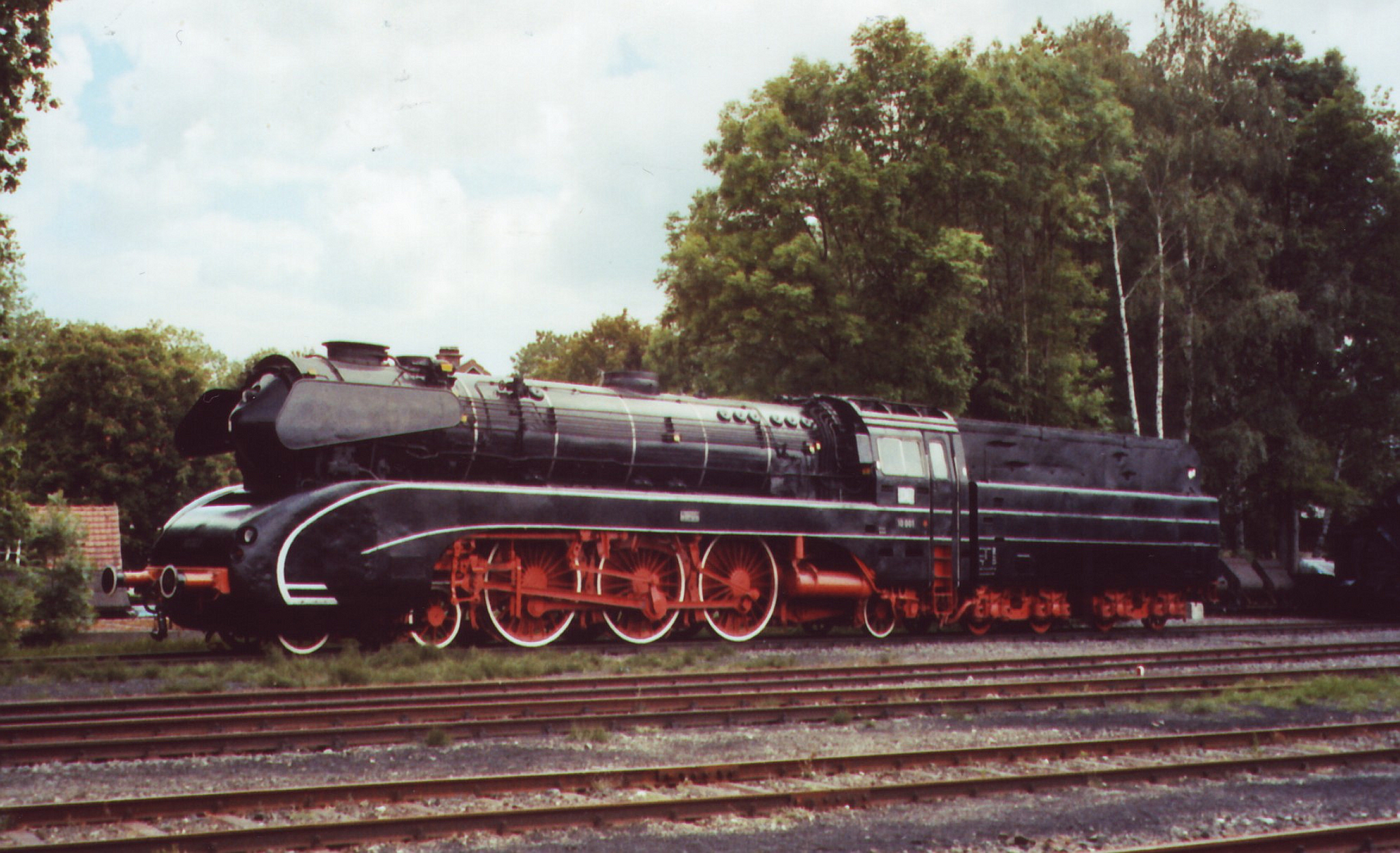
A DB Class 10, number 10 001

German Steam Locomotive Museum

The German Steam Locomotive Museum (Deutsches Dampflokomotiv-Museum) or DDM is located at the foot of the famous Schiefe Ebene ramp on the Ludwig South-North Railway in Neuenmarkt, Upper Franconia. This region is in northern Bavaria, Germany. The DDM was founded in 1977.

== Facilities ==
The museum is in the former locomotive shed (Bahnbetriebswerk) at Neuenmarkt-Wirsberg station. It comprises a 15-road roundhouse, water cranes, a turntable with an off-centre pivot, a coaling facility and a Ruge coal crane in a newly built 'old fashioned' working coal yard.

== History ==
The locomotive shed was built in 1895 by the Royal Bavarian State Railways and extended in 1923 by the Deutsche Reichsbahn. Amongst others, pusher locomotives e. g. DRG Class 95s (ex-Prussian T 20s) and Class 96s (ex-Bavarian Gt 2x4/4 Mallet locomotives) were stationed there. One example of a Class 95 may be seen in the museum.

== Locomotives ==
Around 30 steam locomotives may be seen, including a Bavarian S 3/6 express engine, a Bavarian PtL 2/2 (a tiny tank engine known as the Glaskasten, literally: 'glass box', the only complete surviving member of its class), a Prussian P 8 passenger train engine and a Saxon XIV HT. Deutsche Reichsbahn locomotives represented include Class 01, 03, 44, 50, 64, and 86 engines and there are Deutsche Bundesbahn Class 10 and 23 locomotives, as well as industrial engines. In addition there is a museum-owned narrow-gauge line on the land which is worked by steam and diesel locomotives. An electric express train locomotive, the DB Class 103, may temporarily be seen in the DDM as a museum locomotive.

== Photos ==
Except where stated, all locomotives depicted belong to the DDM.

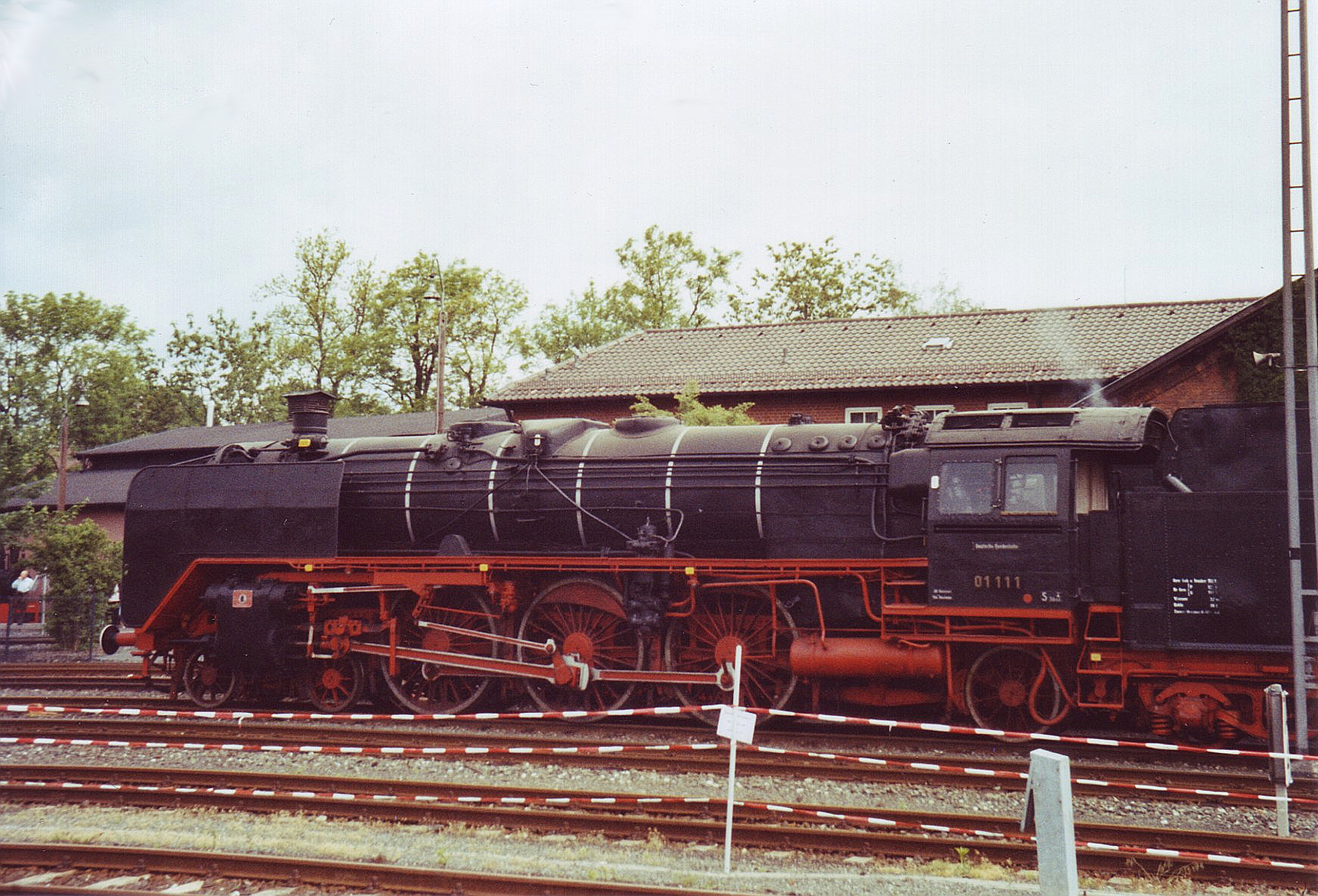
DRG Class 01 locomotive 01 111

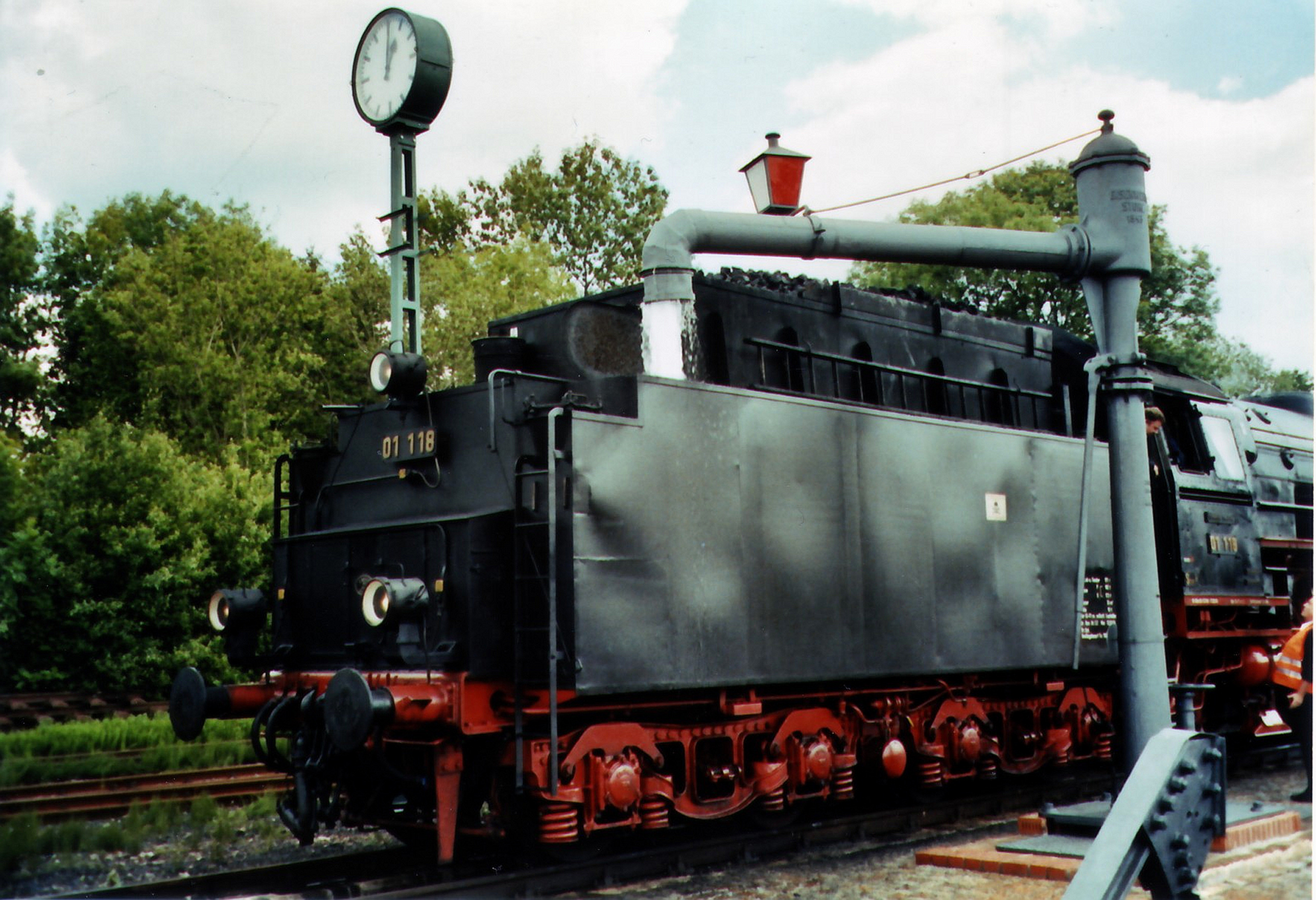
Number 01 118, a DRG Class 01 from the Historische Eisenbahn Frankfurt at the water crane in the coal yard.

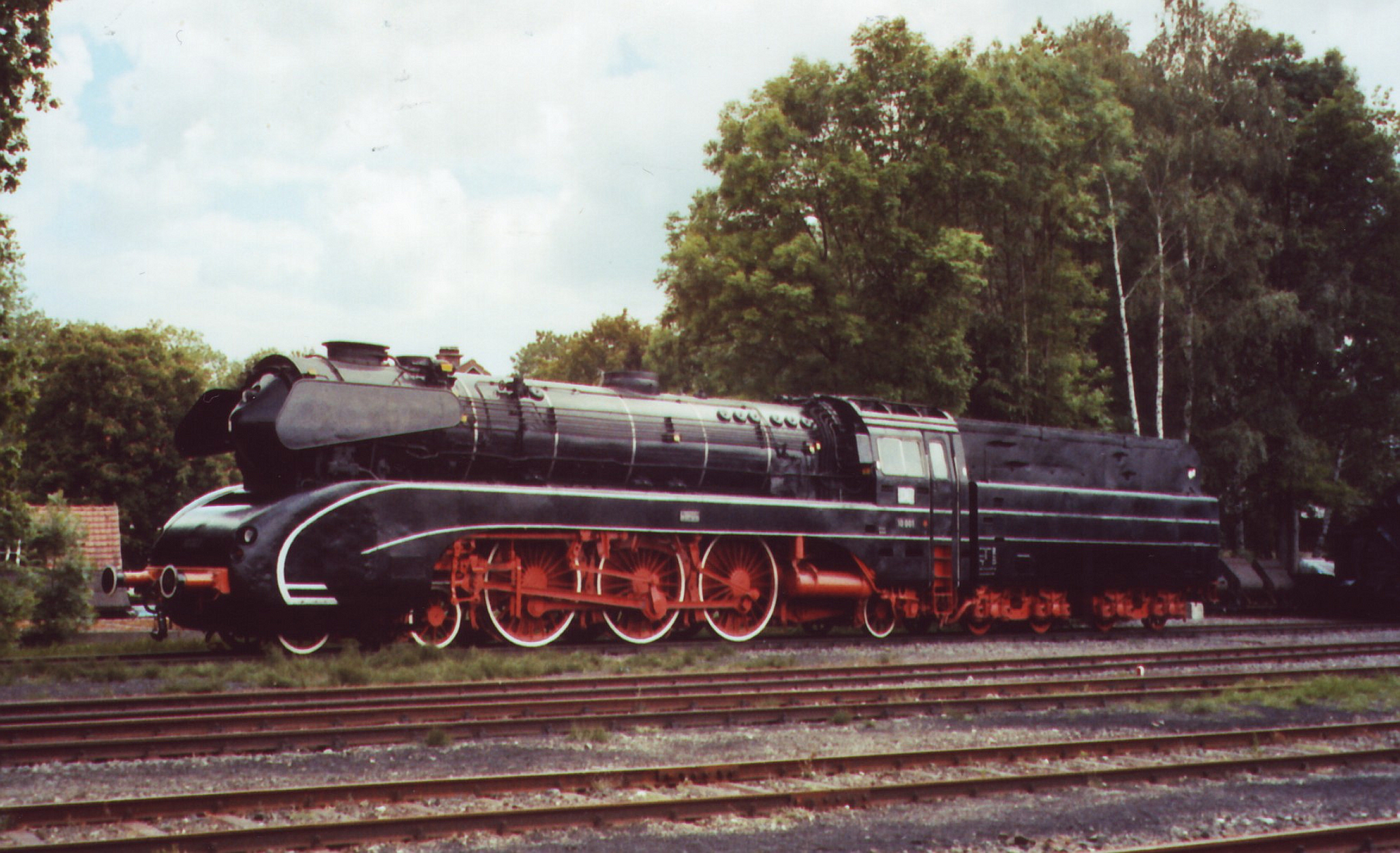
A DB Class 10, number 10 001.

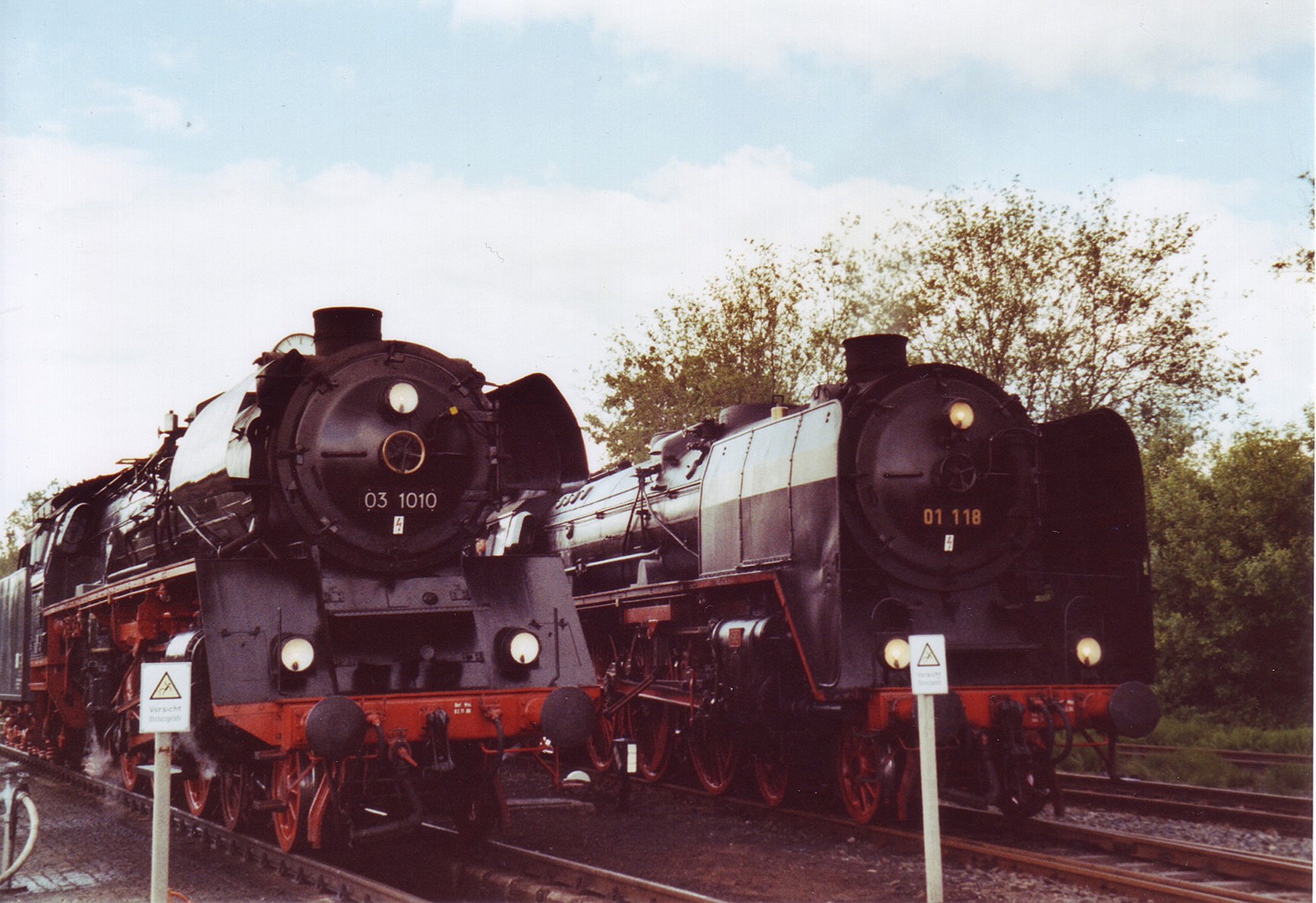
Visiting the DDM: DRG classes 01 and 03 compared.

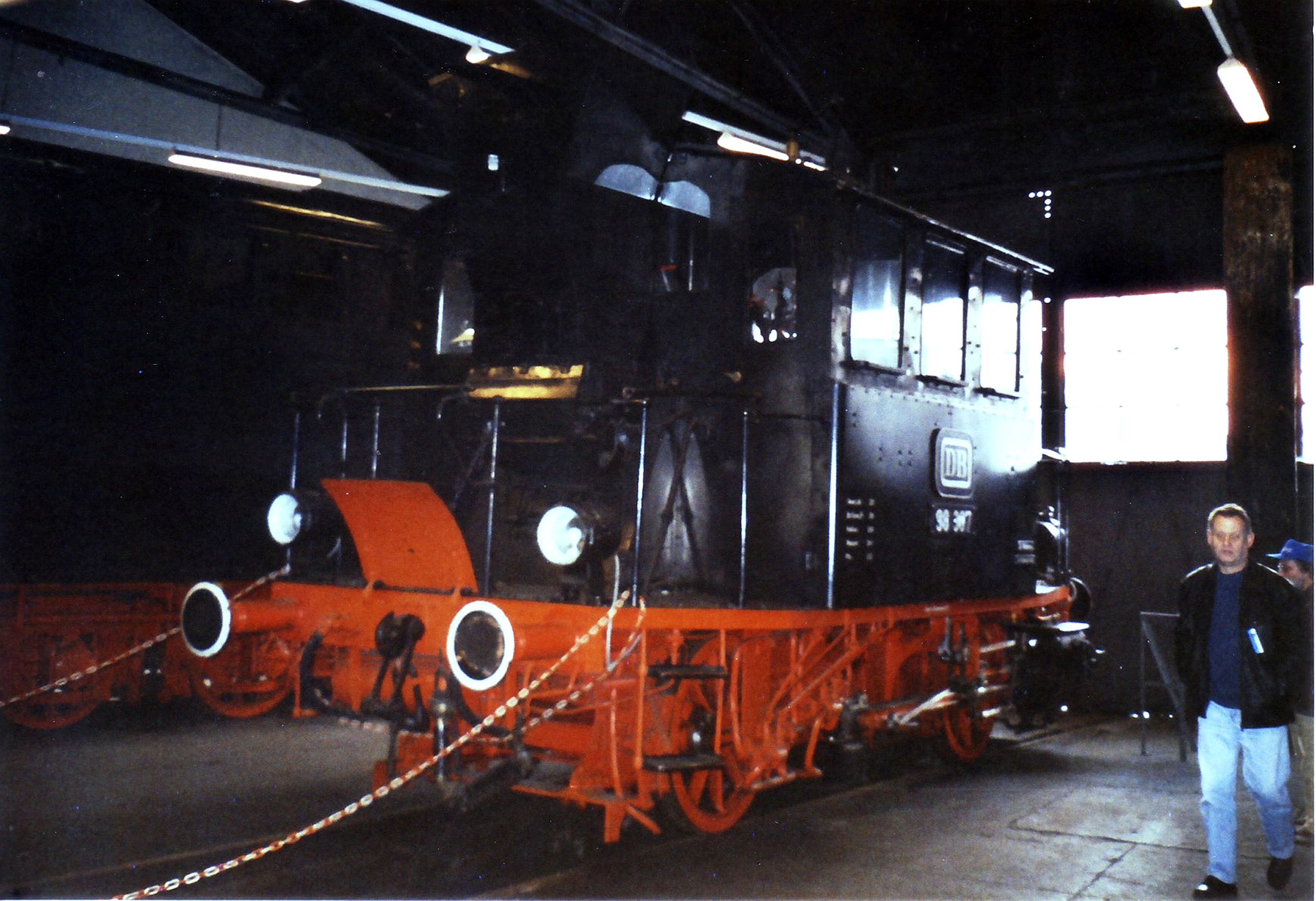
Number 98 307, the DDM's own Glaskasten (Bavarian PtL 2/2).

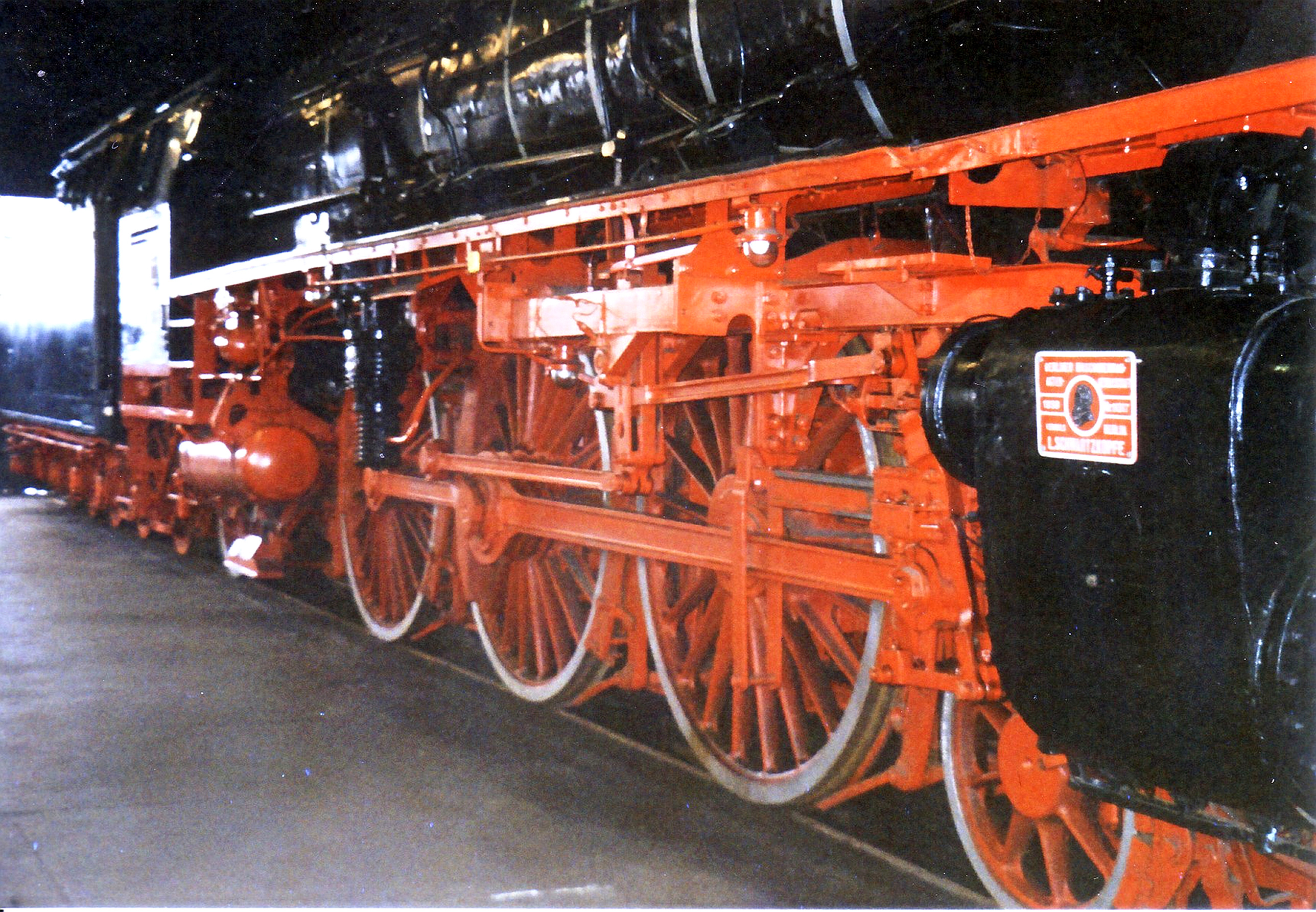
Drive of number 03 131, a DRG Class 03.

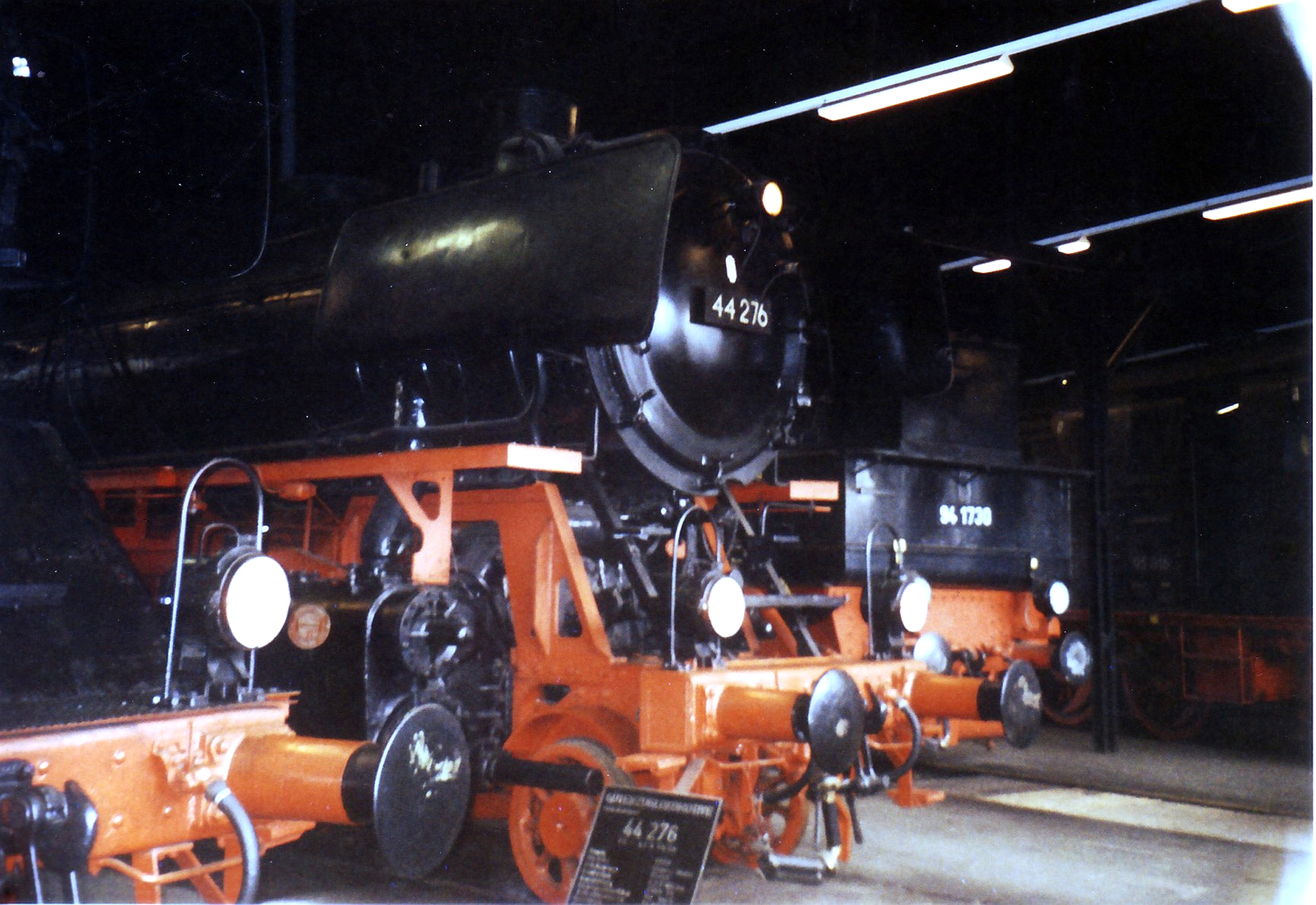
View inside the DDM's roundhouse.

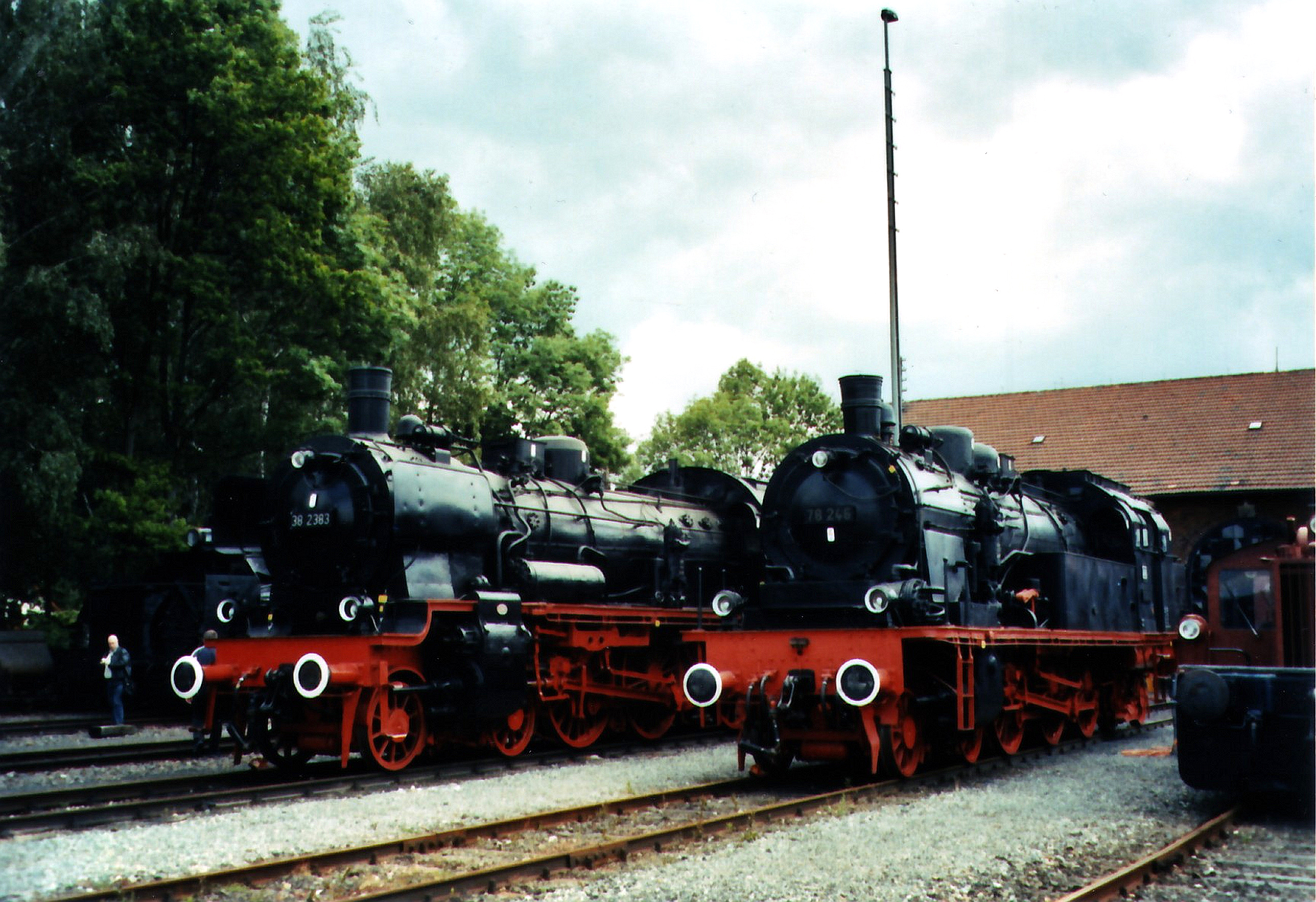
Numbers 38 2383, a Prussian P 8, and 78 246, a Prussian T 18.

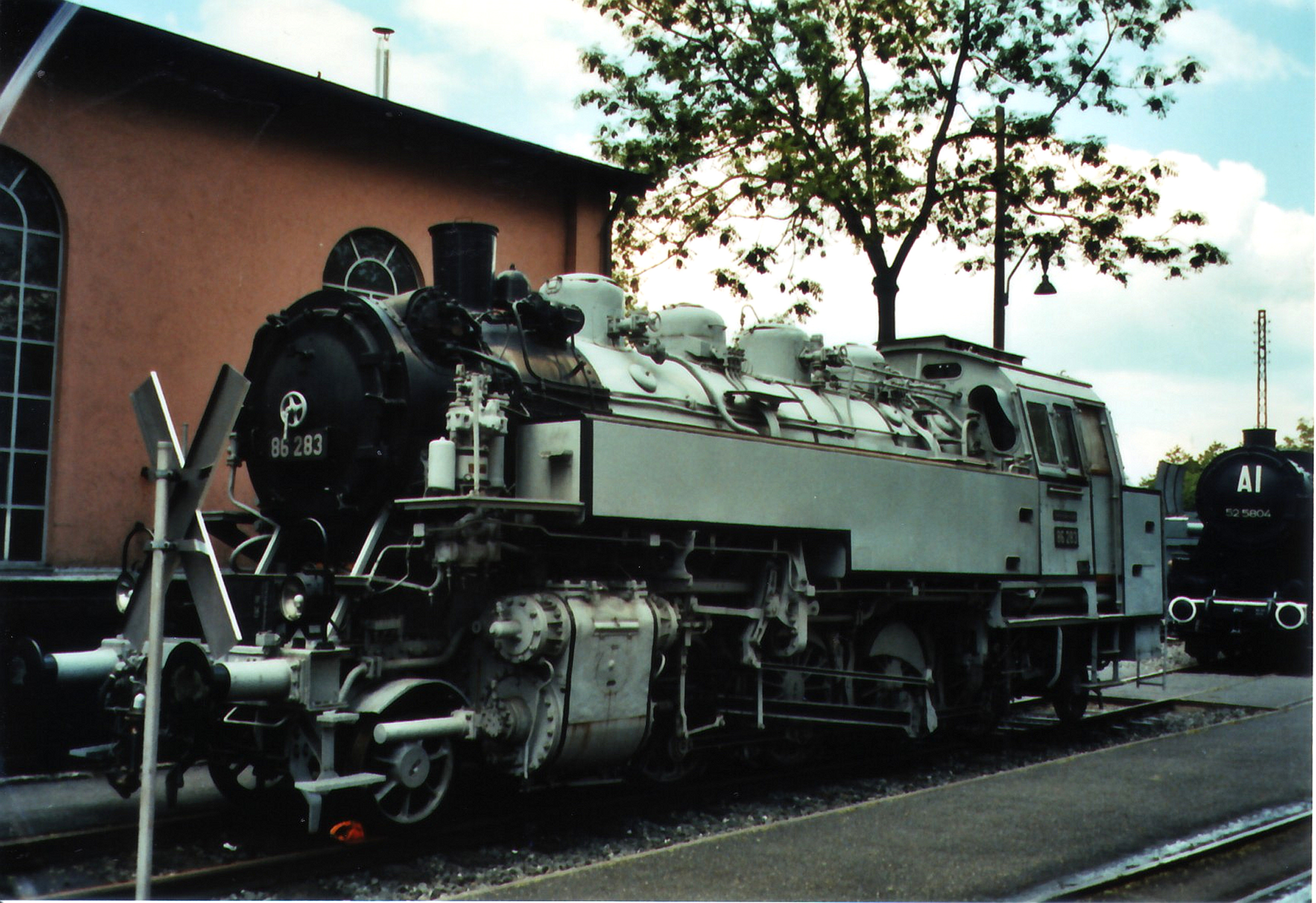
Number 86 283 (DRG Class 86) at the DDM in historical photo-grey livery

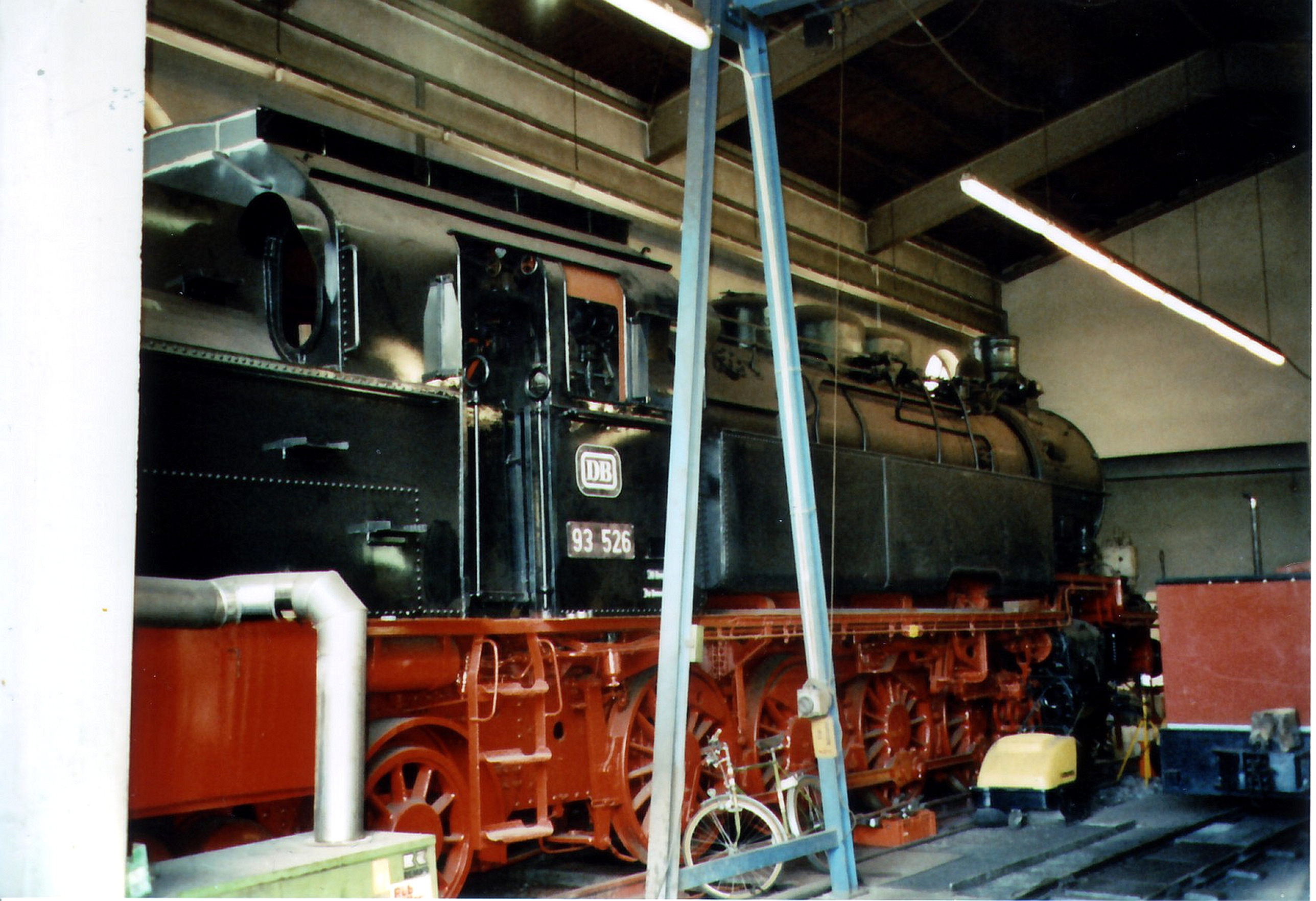
93 526 (Prussian T 14.1) in the DDM workshop

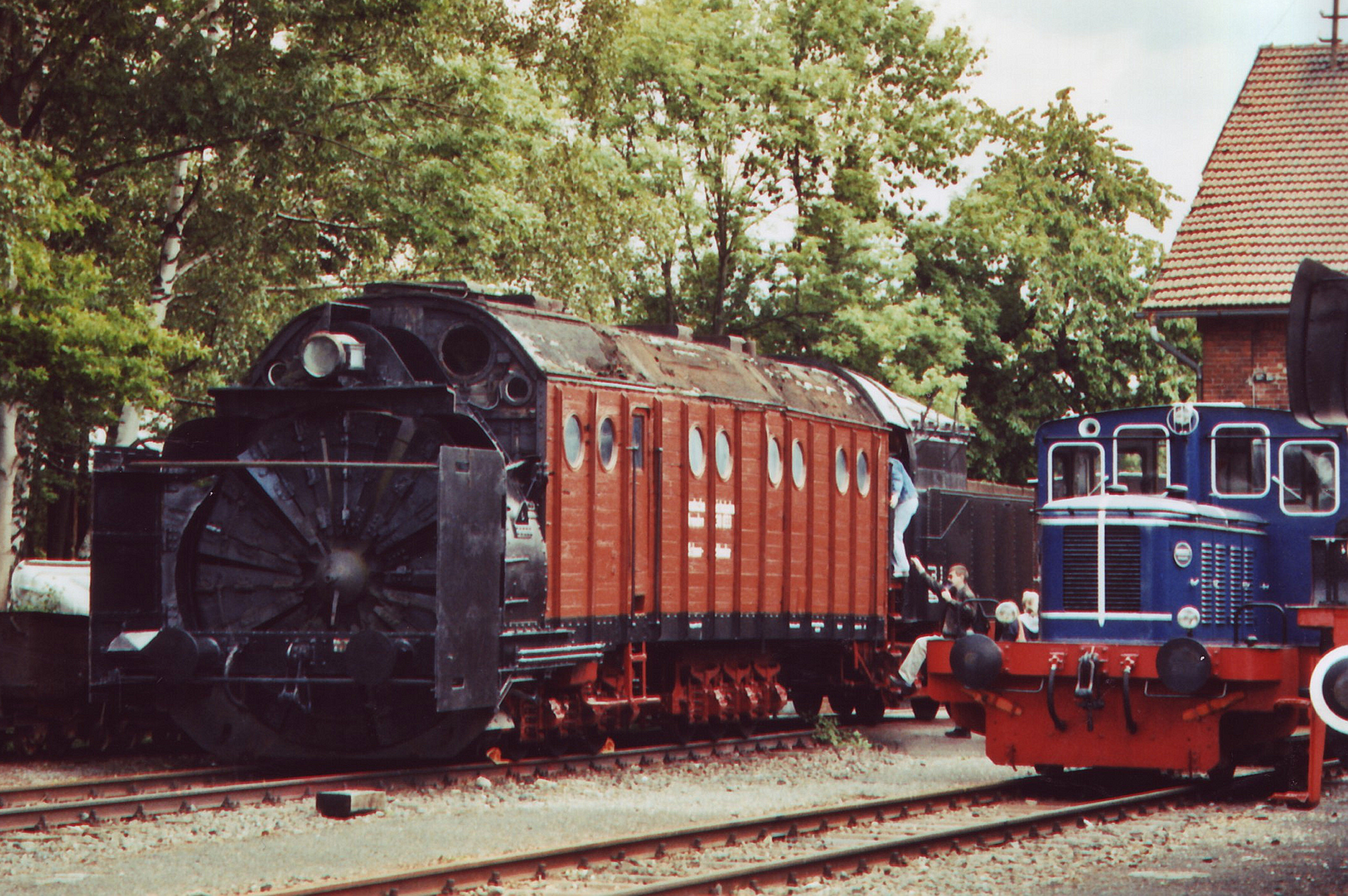
Steam-operated snow machine (Schneefräse) 979 4100 at the DDM.

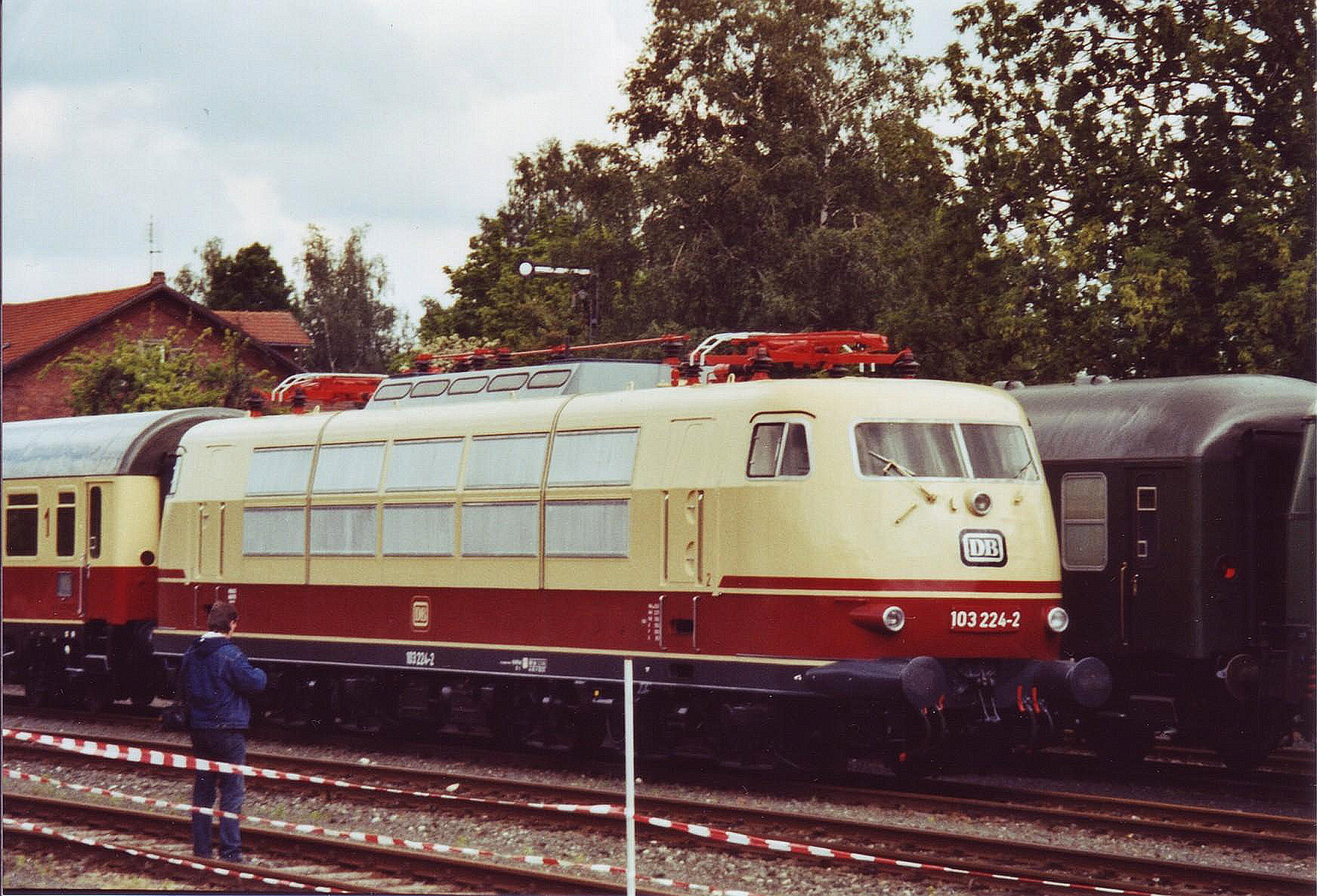
DB museum loco 103 224-2, a DB Class 103.

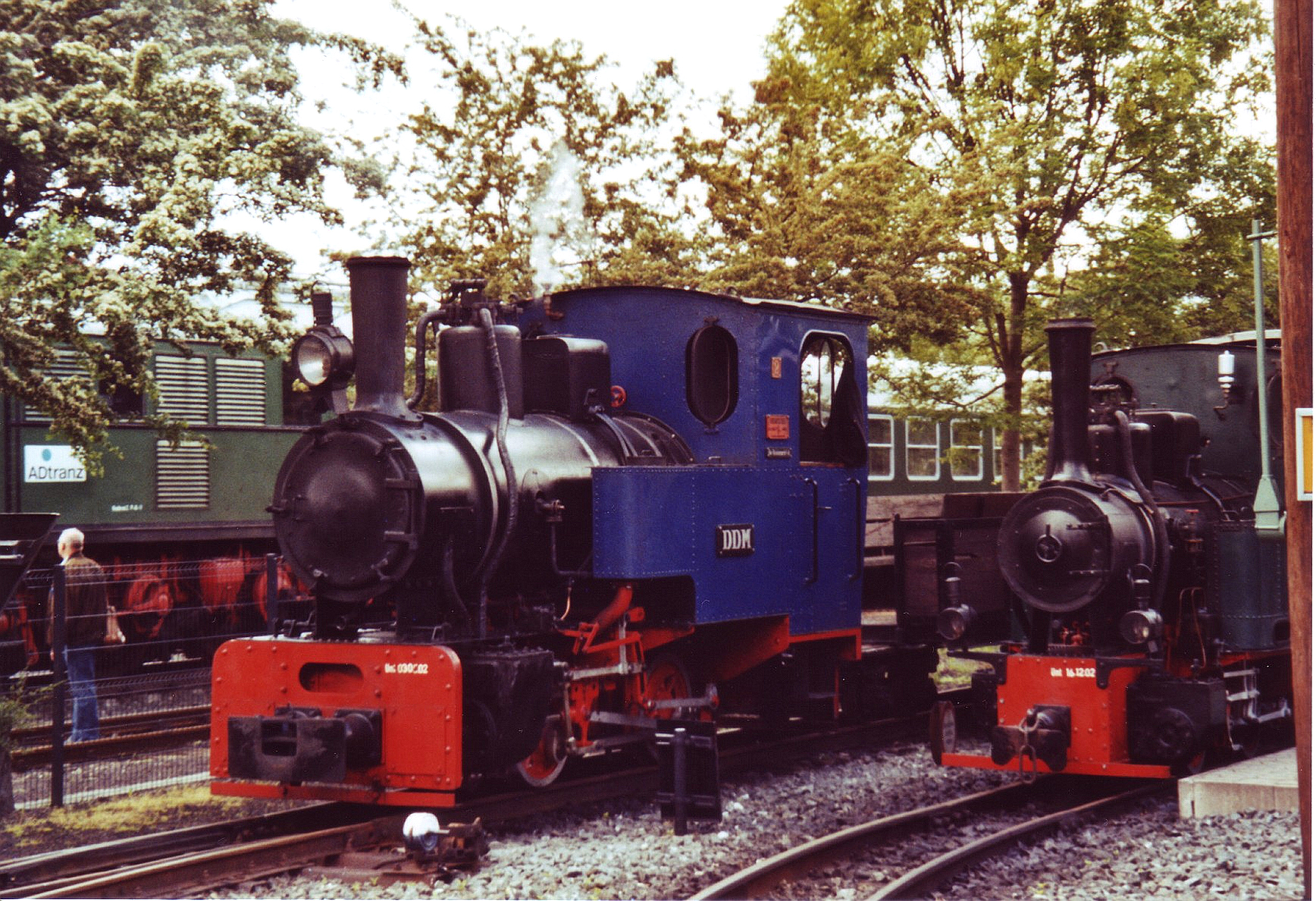
Two working narrow-gauge steam locomotives.

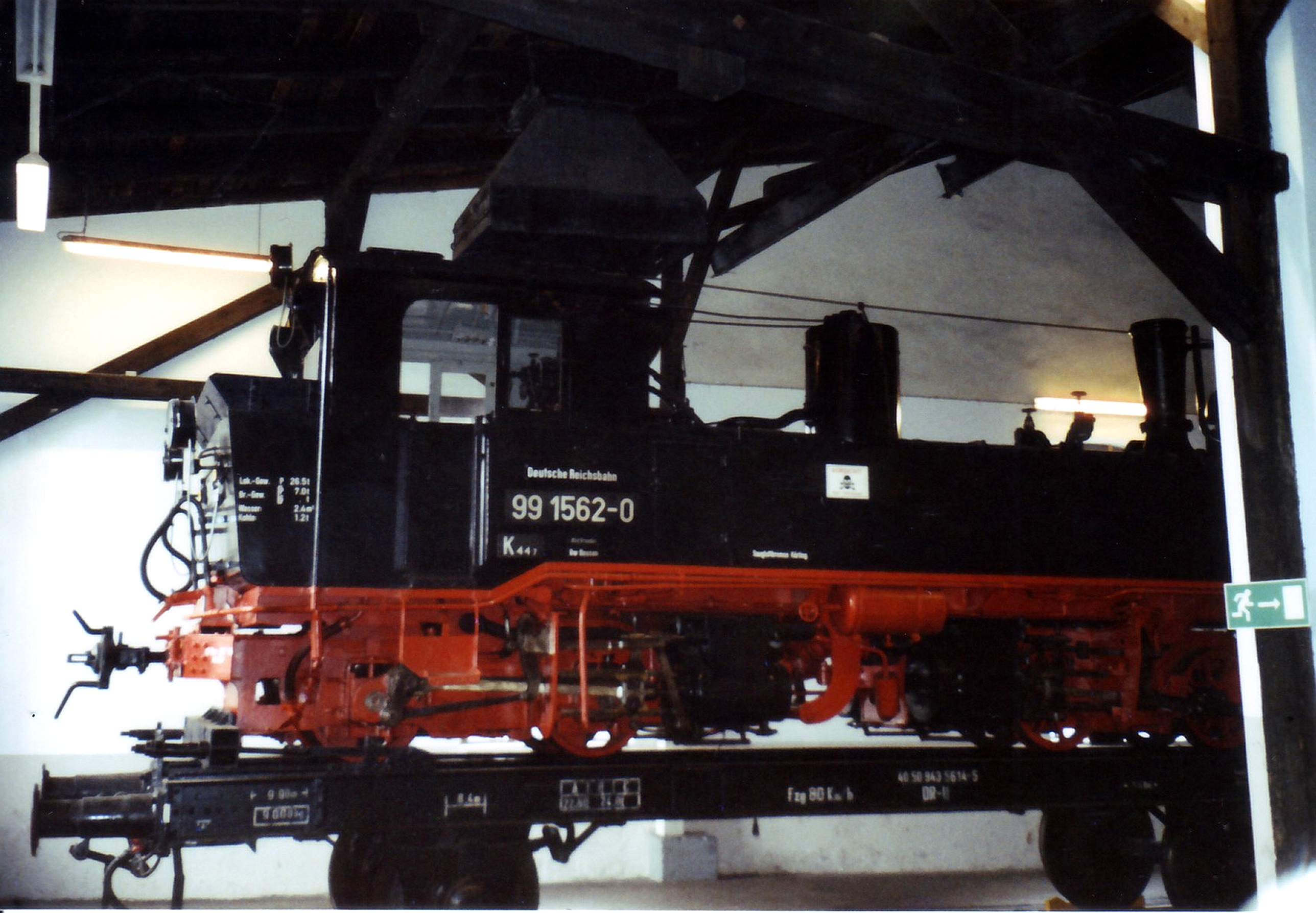
Narrow-gauge steam engine 99 1562-0, a Meyer-type engine (IV K)

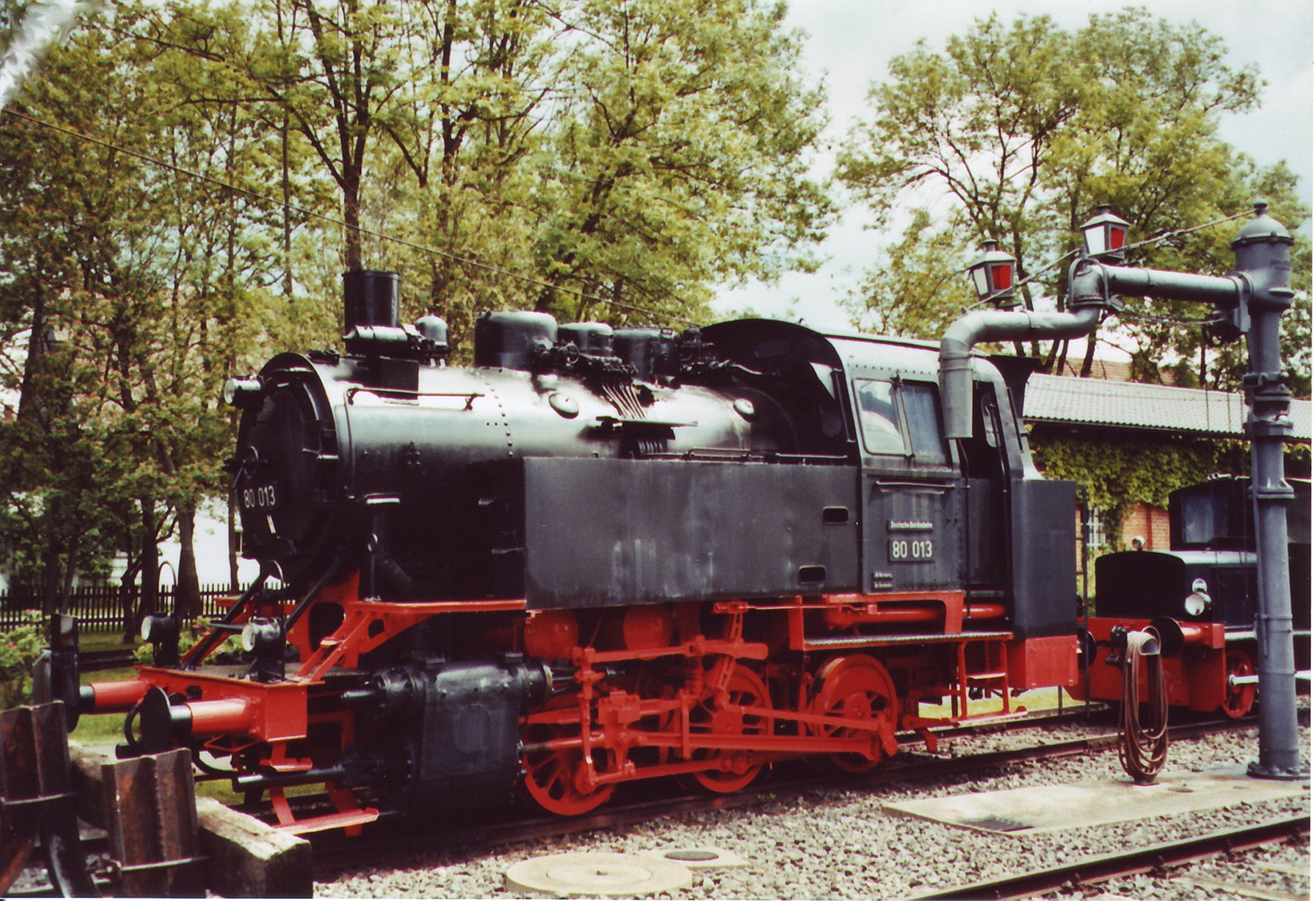
Shunting tank locomotive 80 013 (DRG Class 80), Hagans Fabriknummer 1227, 1927

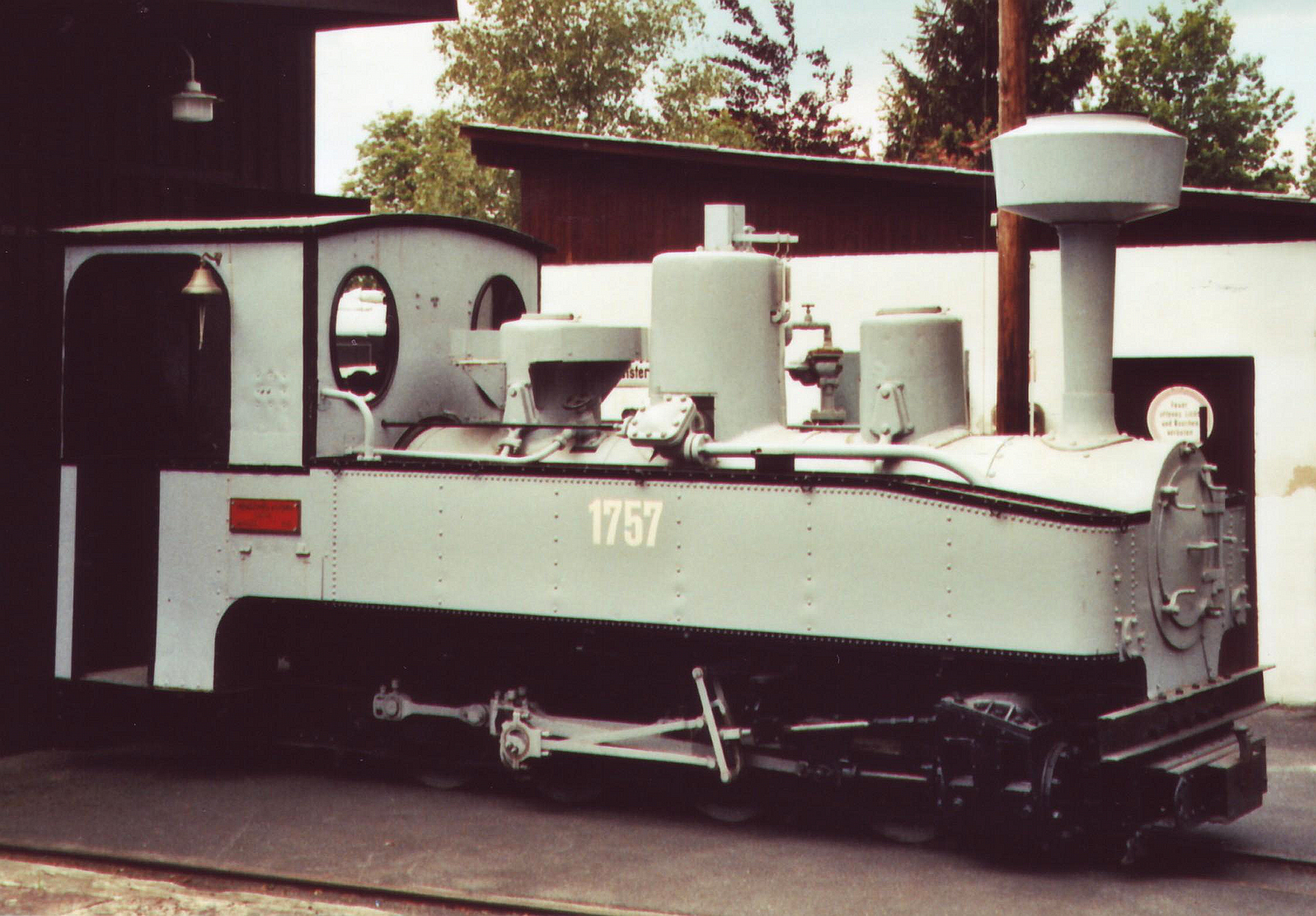
A Feldbahn locomotive, number 1757, a former German Army engine from the First World War

== Other exhibits ==
Various steam locomotive parts are also displayed, such as the smokebox, wheelset and cylinder block from locomotive number 18 610 (S 3/6) as well as the sectioned boiler from a Prussian G 8. Other exhibits of railway history include a steam crane, a saloon coach from Adolf Hitler's special train that was used in 1955 by German chancellor, Konrad Adenauer, on his historic visit to Moscow, a snow plough, a dining car and a historical telegraph station.

In addition there is a large model railway layout (Theme: the Schiefe Ebene).

Also from engine number 18 610 is its tender which is coupled to 18 612.

== Railway operations ==
The museum runs trips over the Schiefe Ebene during the summer from Neuenmarkt-Wirsberg to Marktschorgast and the Mönchshof Brewery at Kulmbach. A Class 796 Uerdingen railbus is stabled at the museum for these services and steam locomotives are also employed.

== See also ==
- History of rail transport in Germany
- Royal Bavarian State Railways
- Deutsche Reichsbahn
- Deutsche Bundesbahn
- Schiefe Ebene
