= Prussian T 20 =

Class of 45 German 2-10-2T locomotives

Prussian T 20 DRG Class 95 DR Class 95.0/1
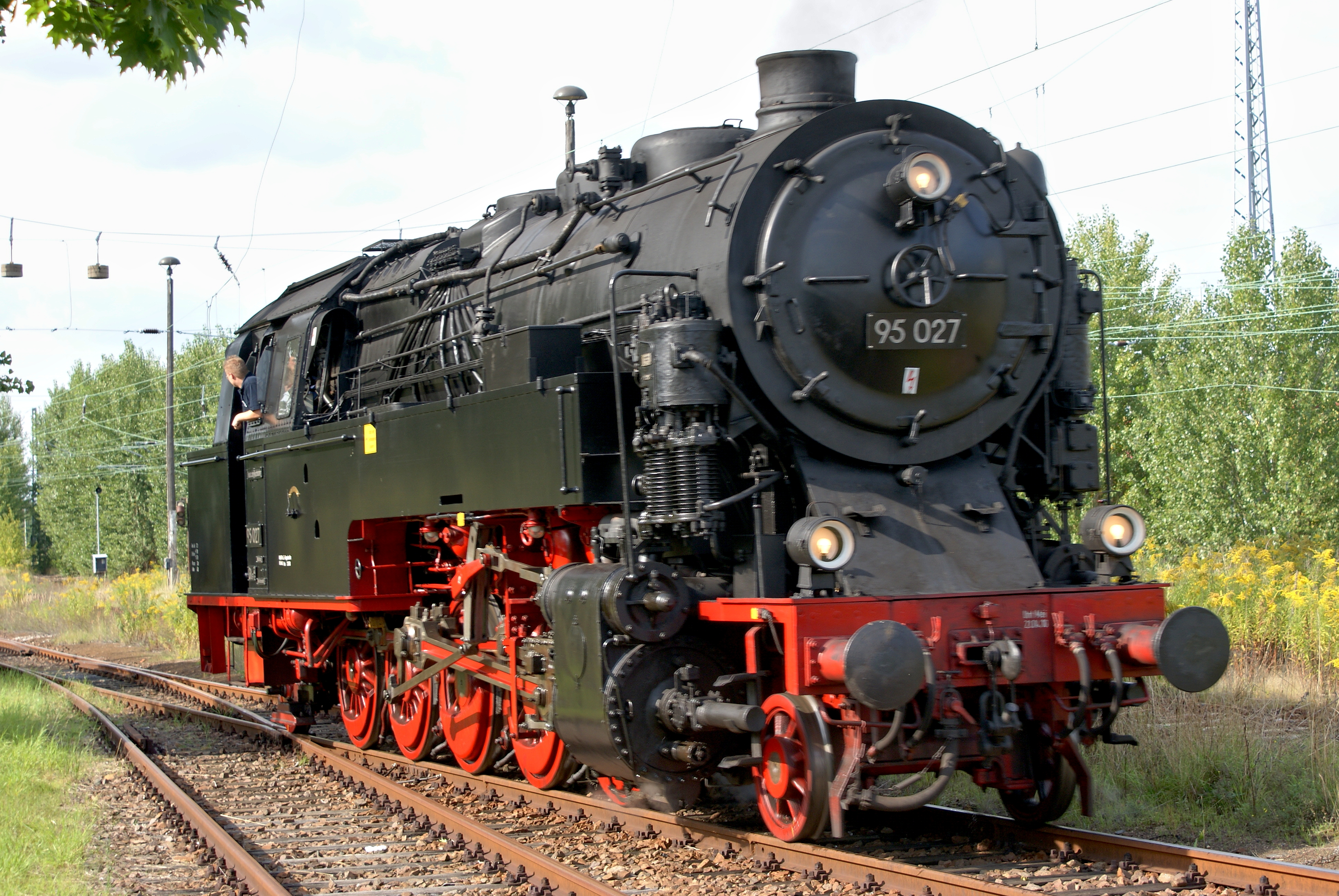
Type and origin
- Builder: Borsig (18); Hanomag (27)
- Build date: 1922–1924
- Total produced: 45
Specifications
  - German: Gt 57.19
- Gauge: 1,435 mm (4 ft 8 1/2 in)
- Leading dia.: 850 mm (2 ft 9 1/2 in)
- Driver dia.: 1,400 mm (4 ft 7 1/8 in)
- Trailing dia.: 850 mm (2 ft 9 1/2 in)
- Wheelbase
  - Overall: 11,900 mm (39 ft 1/2 in)
- Length
  - Over beams: 15,100 mm (49 ft 6 1/2 in)
- Height: 4,550 mm (14 ft 11 1/8 in)
- Axle load: 19.1 t (18.8 long tons; 21.1 short tons)
- Adhesive weight: 95.3 t (93.8 long tons; 105.1 short tons)
- Empty weight: 103.7 t (102.1 long tons; 114.3 short tons)
- Service weight: 127.4 t (125.4 long tons; 140.4 short tons)
- Fuel capacity: 4 t (3.9 long tons; 4.4 short tons) coal
- Water cap.: 12.0 m^{3} (2,600 imp gal; 3,200 US gal)
- Boiler pressure: 14 kgf/cm^{2} (1,370 kPa; 199 psi)
- Heating surface
  - Firebox: 4.36 m^{2} (46.9 sq ft)
  - Evaporative: 200.00 m^{2} (2,152.8 sq ft)
- Superheater
  - Heating area: 62.50 m^{2} (672.7 sq ft)
- Cylinders: Two, outside
- Cylinder size: 700 mm × 660 mm (27 9/16 in × 26 in) (bore × stroke)
- Loco brake: Knorr compressed-air brake Riggenbach counter-pressure brake
Performance figures
- Maximum speed: 70 km/h (43 mph)
- Indicated power: 1,620 PS (1,190 kW; 1,600 hp)
Career
- Numbers: DRG 95 001 – 95 045
- Retired: 1978

The German DRG Class 95 are ten-coupled tank locomotives with a 2-10-2 wheel arrangement, which were procured by the Deutsche Reichsbahn (also referred to later as the Deutsche Reichsbahn-Gesellschaft or DRG) in 1922 for hauling heavy goods trains on steep main lines. Because the development of this class was started by the Prussian state railways, it was designated as the Prussian Class T 20.

== History ==
The first ten locomotives built in 1922 were ordered as T 20 Magdeburg 9201–9210, and because they were at first intended to be grouped into Class 77, were supplied as numbers 77 001 to 77 010. By 1923, they had been renumbered to 95 001–010. A total of 45 locomotives were built by 1924. Their areas of operations included the Sonneberg–Probstzella line, the Spessart ramp, the Franconian Forest Railway, the Geislingen ramp (Geislinger Steige), the Schiefe Ebene and the Rübeland Railway, where they earned their nickname Bergkönigin ('mountain queen').

The locomotives were the most powerful tank engines procured by the DRG. They could haul a train load of 2,060 tonnes (2,030 long tons; 2,270 short tons) at a speed of 50 km/h (31 mph) on level ground and could still manage 430 tonnes (420 long tons; 470 short tons) at 25 km/h (16 mph) on a 25‰ (2.5%) incline. Their very high adhesive weight of 95.3 tonnes (93.8 long tons; 105.1 short tons) enabled them to climb inclines of up to 70‰ (7%) without needing a rack, and their Riggenbach counter-pressure brake ensured that they could slow down with heavy loads while going downhill.

Of the 45 examples owned by the Reichsbahn, the Deutsche Bundesbahn took over 14 that, towards the end, were stationed in Aschaffenburg and used as pusher locomotives on the Spessart ramp. They were retired in 1958. Locomotives had also been stabled in Neuenmarkt-Wirsberg until 1952 for duties on the Schiefe Ebene.

31 locomotives ended up in the East German Deutsche Reichsbahn. Of these, 24 were rebuilt to oil-firing between 1971 and 1973 and ten were given a newly designed boiler. From 1970 the oil-fired engines were designated as DR Class 95.0 and the unconverted ones as DR Class 95.1. The last locomotives worked the line from Sonneberg to Eisfeld and were retired in 1981.

== Preserved Locomotives ==
The following locomotives have been preserved:

- 95 009 (photo above left) at Dieringhausen Railway Museum
- 95 016 (ex Kamenz locomotive depot) in the German Steam Locomotive Museum at Neuenmarkt-Wirsberg.
- 95 020 on display at the Technikmuseum Speyer.
- 95 027 restored and operating on the Rübeland Railway (as of 27 Nov 2010)
- 95 028 in the Bochum-Dahlhausen Railway Museum

At present only 95 027 is operational.

== See also ==
- Prussian state railways
- List of DRG locomotives and railbuses
- List of Prussian locomotives and railbuses

== Sources ==
- Brozeit, Wolfgang; Müller, Hans; Bölke, Günter (1994) [1990]. Baureihe 95: Der Lebenslauf der "Bergkönigin" (in German). Berlin: transpress Verlagsgesellschaft. ISBN 3-344-00377-1.
- Vogelsang, Harald (2002). Die Fahrzeuge und Anlagen des Eisenbahnmuseums Bochum-Dahlhausen (in German). Dt. Ges. für Eisenbahngeschichte. ISBN 3-921700-99-X.
- Weisbrod, Manfred; Müller, Hans; Petznik, Wolfgang (1978). Dampflokomotiven deutscher Eisenbahnen, Baureihe 60–96 (EFA 1.3) (in German) (4th ed.). Düsseldorf: Alba. pp. 216–220. ISBN 3-87094-083-2.
