= Schiefe Ebene =

Coordinates: 50°04′31″N 11°36′53″E

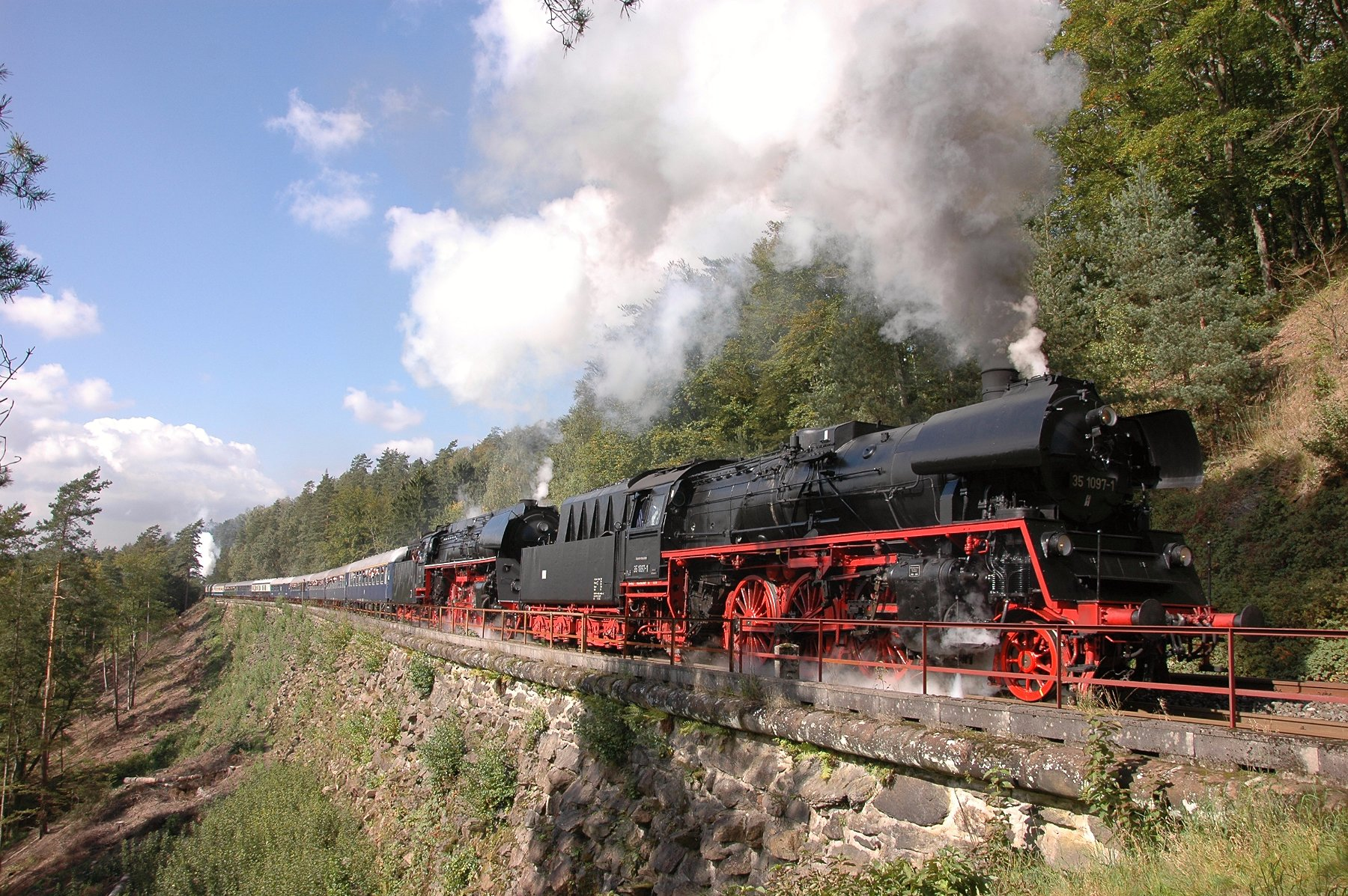
- Steam special on the Schiefe Ebene (2010)

Overview
- Line number: 5100

Service
- Route number: 512, 820, 850

Technical
- Track gauge: 1,435 mm (4 ft 8 1/2 in)
- Operating speed: 120 km/h (75 mph)
- Maximum incline: 2.5%

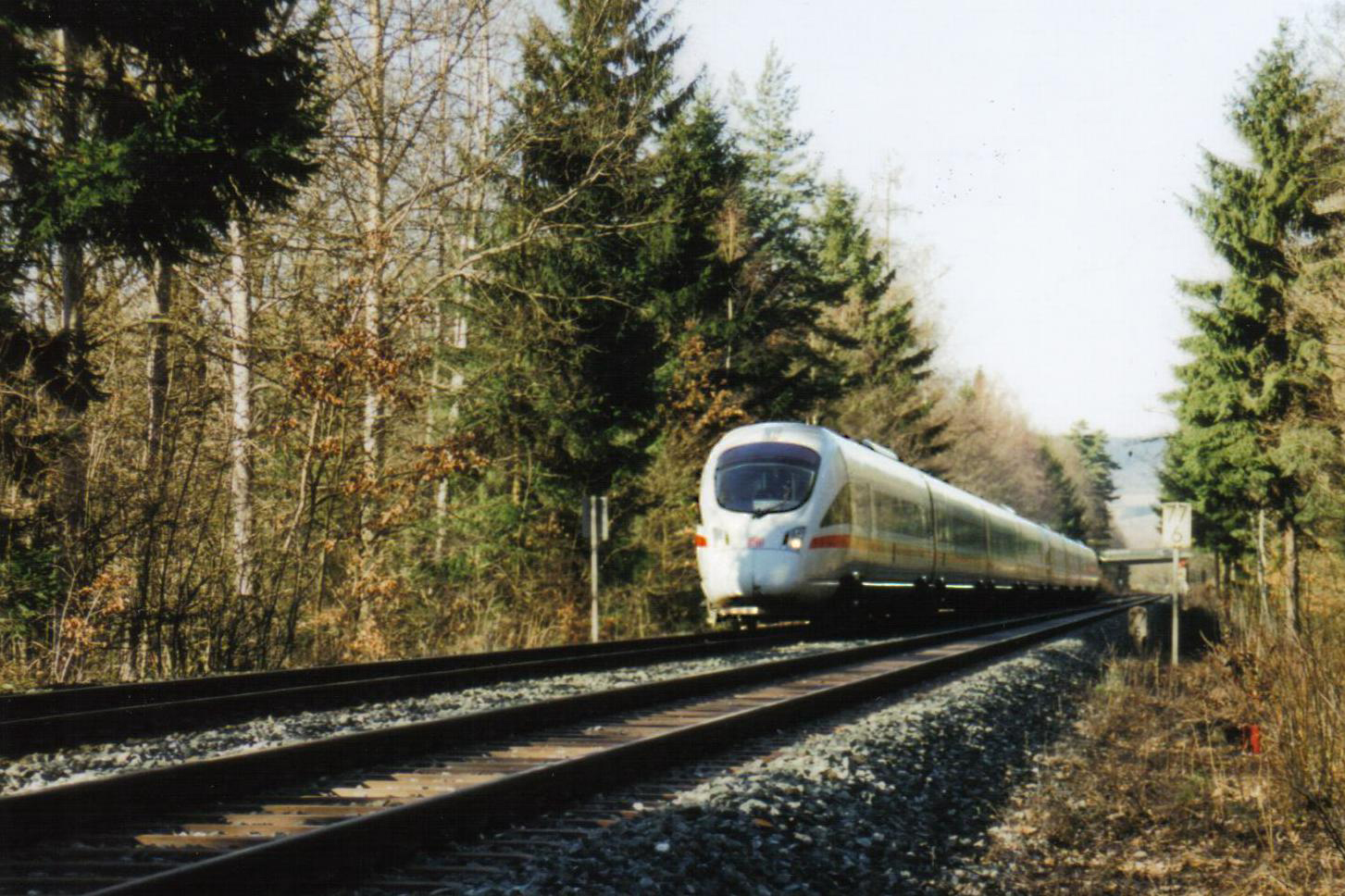
An ICE TD on the Schiefe Ebene (March 2002)

The Schiefe Ebene (German pronunciation: [ˈʃiːfə ˈʔeːbənə]; literally 'inclined plane') is a steep incline on Bamberg–Hof section of the Ludwig South-North Railway in the region of Upper Franconia, in Bavaria, Germany.

== Location and construction ==
The Schiefe Ebene is located in the Landkreis (country district) of Kulmbach, beginning east of Neuenmarkt–Wirsberg station and ending at Marktschorgast. The route is not electrified, but has been widened to two tracks. On the adjacent incline between Marktschorgast and Stammbach, the second track has been subsequently dismantled. On its way into the Franconian Forest mountains the ramp climbs 157.7 metres over a distance of 6.8 kilometres and therefore has an average incline of 23‰ (UK: 1 in 43). It was built between 1844 and 1848 as part of the Ludwig South-North line and was opened on 1 November 1848. With its numerous supporting walls, cuttings and stone embankments it was one of the great engineering feats of its time. The cost of construction was 917,318 Gulden.

== Operation ==
41 018 climbing the Schiefe Ebene with 01 1066 as pusher (Video, 34,4 MB)

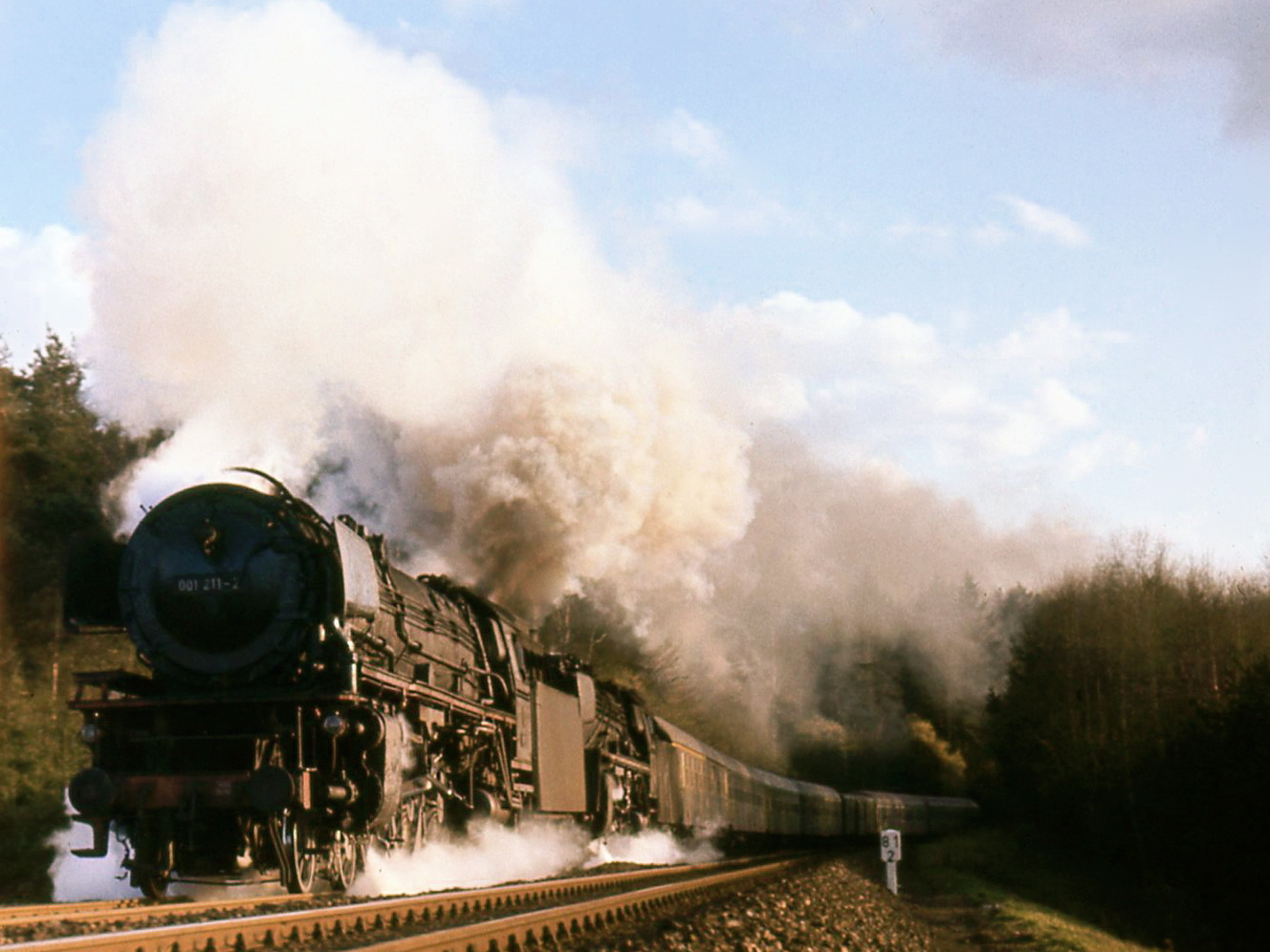
Double-headed pacifics on the Schiefe Ebene at Easter 1972.

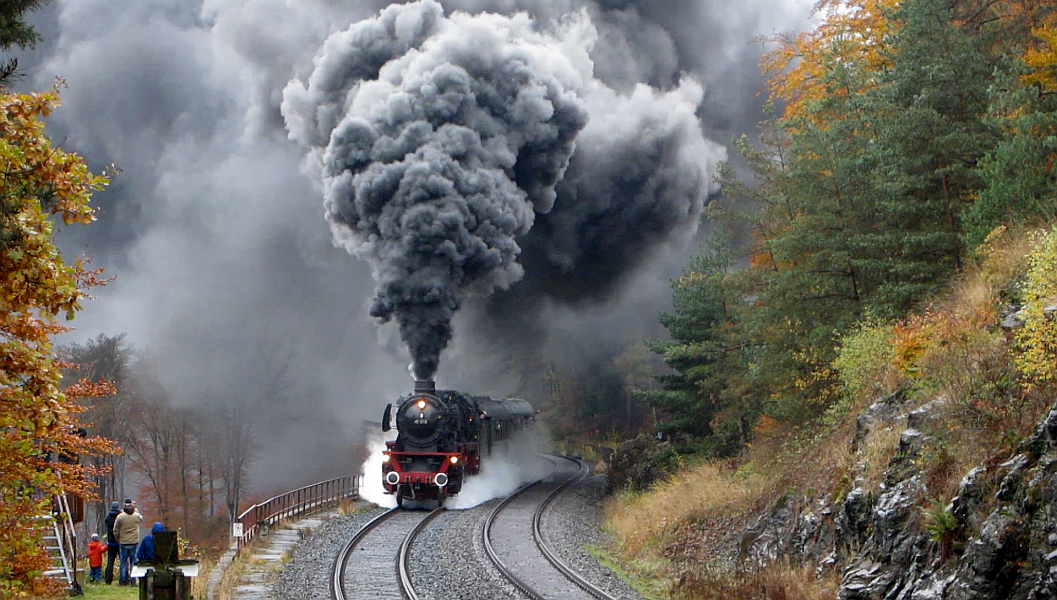
41 018 climbing the Schiefe Ebene, November 2016

In the era of steam, the ramp proved a real challenge for locomotives and crews. The majority of trains had to be reinforced by heavy pusher locomotives. These were stationed in the well-known locomotive depot at Neuenmarkt-Wirsberg. They included famous locomotives such as the DRG Class 95 (ex-Prussian T 20) and DRG Class 96 (ex-Bavarian Gt 2x4/4), as well as DRG Classes 57 (ex-Prussian G 10) and 50.

In the early 1970s, the route was one of the last stamping grounds of the Deutsche Bundesbahn's Class 01 express train steam locomotive. From 2001 to 2004 the Schiefe Ebene was also traversed by modern ICE-TD power cars (DBAG Class 605) with tilting technology. Today the line is worked by the tilting DMUs of DB Class 612, that serve the hourly RegionalExpress lines of Hof–Würzburg and Hof–Lichtenfels as well as the Interregio-Express line Nürnberg-Hof-Dresden.

At the foot of the ramp in the former locomotive depot at Neuenmarkt-Wirsberg station – located in Neuenmarkt – is the German Steam Locomotive Museum (Deutsches Dampflokomotiv-Museum) or DDM. In the upper station, in the former waiting room of Marktschorgast station, there is a small museum and information centre on the history of the Schiefe Ebene. Entrance is free.

Marktschorgast station is also the start of a railway history trail that runs along the Schiefe Ebene and recounts the history of the line on display boards. The walk ends at Neuenmarkt-Wirsberg station. The trail should be walked with stout footwear and can be completed in a few hours (length 7–8 km, hilly terrain). On the road side of Marktschorgast station is an overview board of the trail; the first display board is on the road side of the former goods shed, about 20 m northeast (in the direction of Hof) next to the railway yard.

== Accident in 1944 ==
On 27 December 1944 a serious accident occurred when a military train derailed in Neuenmarkt station, after its brakes had been unable to reduce the speed of the train sufficiently coming down the Schiefe Ebene. The exact cause is unknown. The train was hauled by the locomotive 58 2813. The fireman, the engine driver and a non-commissioned officer died in the accident and an unknown number of people were injured.

== Literature ==
- Steffen Lüdecke: Die Schiefe Ebene. Eine legendäre Eisenbahnstrecke. EK-Verlag. Freiburg im Breisgau 1993 ISBN 3-88255-833-4

== See also ==
- History of rail transport in Germany
- Royal Bavarian State Railways
- German Steam Locomotive Museum
- Other famous south-German ramps: the Geislinger Steige and the Spessart Ramp
