= Neuenmarkt =

- Municipality
- Coat of arms

- Location of Neuenmarkt within Kulmbach district
- Interactive map of Neuenmarkt
- Location within Germany Location within Bavaria
- Coordinates: 50°6′N 11°35′E
- Country: Germany
- State: Bavaria
- Admin. region: Oberfranken
- District: Kulmbach

Government
  - Mayor (2020–26): Alexander Wunderlich (CSU)

Area
  - Total: 18.95 km^{2} (7.32 sq mi)
- Elevation: 348 m (1,142 ft)

Population (2025-12-31)
  - Total: 2,954
  - Density: 155.9/km^{2} (403.7/sq mi)
- Time zone: UTC+01:00 (CET)
  - Summer (DST): UTC+02:00 (CEST)
- Postal codes: 95339
- Dialling codes: 09227
- Vehicle registration: KU
- Website: www.neuenmarkt.de

Neuenmarkt is a municipality in the district of Kulmbach in Bavaria in Germany.

== City arrangement ==
Neuenmarkt is arranged in the following boroughs:

- Brandhaus
- Eichmühle
- Hegnabrunn
- Lettenhof
- Neuenmarkt
- Oberlangenroth

- Raasen
- Reutlashof
- Schlömen
- See
- Unterlangenroth
