= Henschel-Wegmann Train =

German express train service

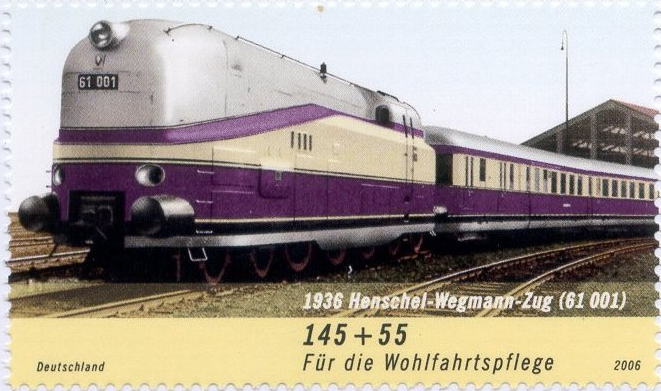
The Henschel-Wegmann Train (2006 postage stamp)

The Henschel-Wegmann Train was an advanced passenger express train operated by the Deutsche Reichsbahn in Germany, which ran non-stop express services between Berlin and Dresden (see Berlin–Dresden railway) from June 1936 to August 1939. Both the DRG Class 61 steam locomotive at its head as well as the coaches were streamlined.

== Emergence ==
=== Context ===
At the beginning of the 1930s, the Deutsche Reichsbahn-Gesellschaft was increasingly striving to introduce express train services. In 1931 it started building express diesel units like the Flying Hamburger and they were introduced with great success from 1933 onwards. As a result, a serious competitor had arisen for the steam locomotive industry. Moreover, the Reichsbahn had hardly procured any locomotives since the start of the Great Depression. Comparative calculations indicated that steam engines could be more cost-effective than the new diesel multiple units, so the head of the locomotive firm, Henschel-Werke, in Kassel, and its manager, Karl Imfeld, decided to develop an engine that could compete with the performance of the new diesel railcars.

=== Planning ===
In April 1933, representatives from Henschel and the coach firm of Wegmann & Co. handed a Study Into A High-Speed Steam Train (Studie über einen schnellfahrenden Dampfzug) to the general manager of the Deutsche Reichsbahn-Gesellschaft, Julius Dorpmüller. This report envisaged a light, 4-4-2, superheated, tank locomotive with a two-coach unit, whose procurement and maintenance costs were low and which also offered passengers greater comfort. In order to minimise air resistance, the whole train would be streamlined and the double-coach rounded off at both ends. The locomotive, its streamlining extending at the back over the coal tank, would be able to push or pull from either end of the double-coach depending on the direction of travel. The link between engine and coaches would be an automatic coupling with brake and air pipes.

On 10 January 1934, when the Reichsbahn locomotive expert, Friedrich Fuchs, met the representatives of Henschel and Wegmann, he confronted them however with a proposal for a train with four eight-wheeled coaches instead of the two-coach train. To meet this new requirement, Henschel designed a 4-6-4 tank engine and presented the resulting project study report on 27 March 1934 to the Reichsbahn head office. On 28 August, the Reichsbahn officially contracted Henschel and Wegmann to build the train.

=== Construction ===
The engine was handed over on 31 May 1935. She was cleared for a top speed of 175 km/h which, with her 2.3 metre diameter driving wheels, was easily attained. In scheduled services the engine ran with a streamlined train, but only at speeds up to 160 km/h. The tapered water tanks gave both driver and fireman a good all-round view of the line and the streamlined shell, officially called a Blechmantel, covered the driving gear fully.

At around 230,000 Reichsmarks the engine was clearly more expensive than initially suggested. But that included all the design changes. By comparison a production version of the DRG Class 03 cost about 200,000 Reichsmarks. On top of that was the cost of the four coaches, 446,800 Reichsmarks. Three years later, a three-coach express unit of the "Köln" type, in series production, cost 600,000 Reichsmarks, the one-off SVT 135 155 as much as a million Reichsmarks.

Shortly after construction had begun on locomotive 61 001, a variant - number 61 002 - was planned, and built in 1939. Locomotive 61 002 was given a three-axle trailing bogie, a third cylinder and larger coal and water tanks, otherwise the design and the components were the same as her predecessor. It also had smoke deflectors above on the chimney, as were also fitted to the streamlined locomotives of DRG Classes 01.10 and 03.10. In May the first factory trial runs were carried out and the locomotive was transferred on 12 June 1939 to the locomotive depot (Bahnbetriebswerk) of Berlin-Grunewald.

== Vehicle designation and equipment ==
The Henschel-Wegmann train comprised the following:

- Steam locomotive 61 001; a streamlined tank locomotive with a 4-6-4 configuration, inside cylinders and 2.30 metre high driving wheels. Permitted top speed: 175 km/h;
- A trailer car (SBC 4ü-35) with 24 seats in 2nd and 32 seats in 3rd class, as well as four rotating seats in the panorama section at the end;
- Two centre cars (SBC 4ü) with 12 seats in 2nd and 56 seats in 3rd class.
- A trailer car (SWRPwPost 4ü) with a compartment for sorting post and packages during the journey as well as a dining area with 23 seats.

Externally the coaches resembled the express multiple units of those years. In order the achieve the desired speed, they were of light construction and were five to ten tonnes lighter than normal passenger coaches.

The short-coupled coaches could only be separated in the workshop. To couple the locomotive and coaches Scharfenberg couplers were fitted that at the same time served to couple the brake air pipes. The trailer cars had rounded ends and sloping roofs. The bogies were of the Görlitz III type, the wheelsets ran on roller bearings. Instead of the usual brake blocks the coaches were given disc brakes, that acted directly on the wheel discs.

== Operation ==
=== Exhibition of the vehicles ===
The Henschel-Wegmann train was initially displayed at the Great Exhibition celebrating the centenary of the German Railways from 14 July to 13 October 1935 in Nuremberg and then went to the Kassel shop for further work. On 29 November the vehicles were once again in Nuremberg for the centenary parade, where they hosted a visit to the driver's cab by Hitler. Not until these propaganda events had taken place could the engineers test its performance.

=== Trial runs ===
On the Berlin-Hamburg railway it reached its record speed of 185 km/h. At this speed serious juddering occurred due to the imbalance caused by the twin-cylinder configuration. The locomotive reached its scheduled cruising speed of 160 km/h within six minutes. By 14 May 1936 the engine had completed almost 21,000 km of trial runs.

=== Scheduled Service ===
Journey Times
Station	D 53	D 57
Dresden Hauptbahnhof	09.31	17.26
Berlin Anhalter Bahnhof	11.12	19.06

Station	D 54	D 58
Berlin Anhalter Bahnhof	15.10	22.10
Dresden Hauptbahnhof	16.54	23.52

As the summer timetable of 1936 came into force, the Henschel-Wegmann train worked the Berlin-Dresden line with two pairs of trains per day. The fastest service took one hour and 40 minutes to cover the distance and broke the previous record by 28 minutes; a record which stands to the present day (2018). In the official calculations the Reichsbahn only measured its speed between Berlin and Dresden Neustadt, thus ignoring the last kilometres to Dresden Hauptbahnhof. Thus the average speed of the train could be advertised as 111,2 km/h.

The short turn-around time in Dresden between the D 54 and D 57 services was clearly quite tight. As it turned out, the locomotive not only had to run around the train, but also to replenish its supplies. Fortunately it did not have to be turned. This problem with the turn-around time was corrected by the Reichsbahn in the winter timetable of 1936. When locomotive 61 001 or its coaches were not available an engine of DRG Class 01 or DRG Class 03 was used. With their top speeds of 130 and 140 km/h, however they were no match for the 61 001.

Passengers only had to pay an express train supplement, not the higher long-distance (FD) supplementary fare, as in the express multiple units.

== End of the Train ==
=== In the Second World War ===
Shortly before the invasion of Poland in August 1939, express services between the two state capitals were withdrawn. The coaches ended up in the Wehrmacht, where they were initially used by high-ranking officers and, later, for transporting the wounded, after their interior fittings had been removed.

Locomotive 61 001 was then used as a heating engine at the Berlin-Grunewald locomotive depot (Bahnbetriebswerk) in Berlin. From December 1940 it was once again being used in Dresden-Altstadt on express services and in November 1942 was given standard train and buffer equipment. Its operating parameters only showed a slight reduction in performance however. From 1943 to the war's end the repair shop (Ausbesserungswerk) at Brunswick was responsible for the engine.

Inspection and licensing for 61 002 was probably carried out around the turn of the year 1939/40, and it was then no longer used in scheduled services in charge of the Henschel-Wegmann train. That affected a fifth coach built around 1940, that was based in Hamburg-Langenfelde in 1946 together with the other four coaches.

=== After the War ===
==== Blauer Enzian (Blue Gentian) ====
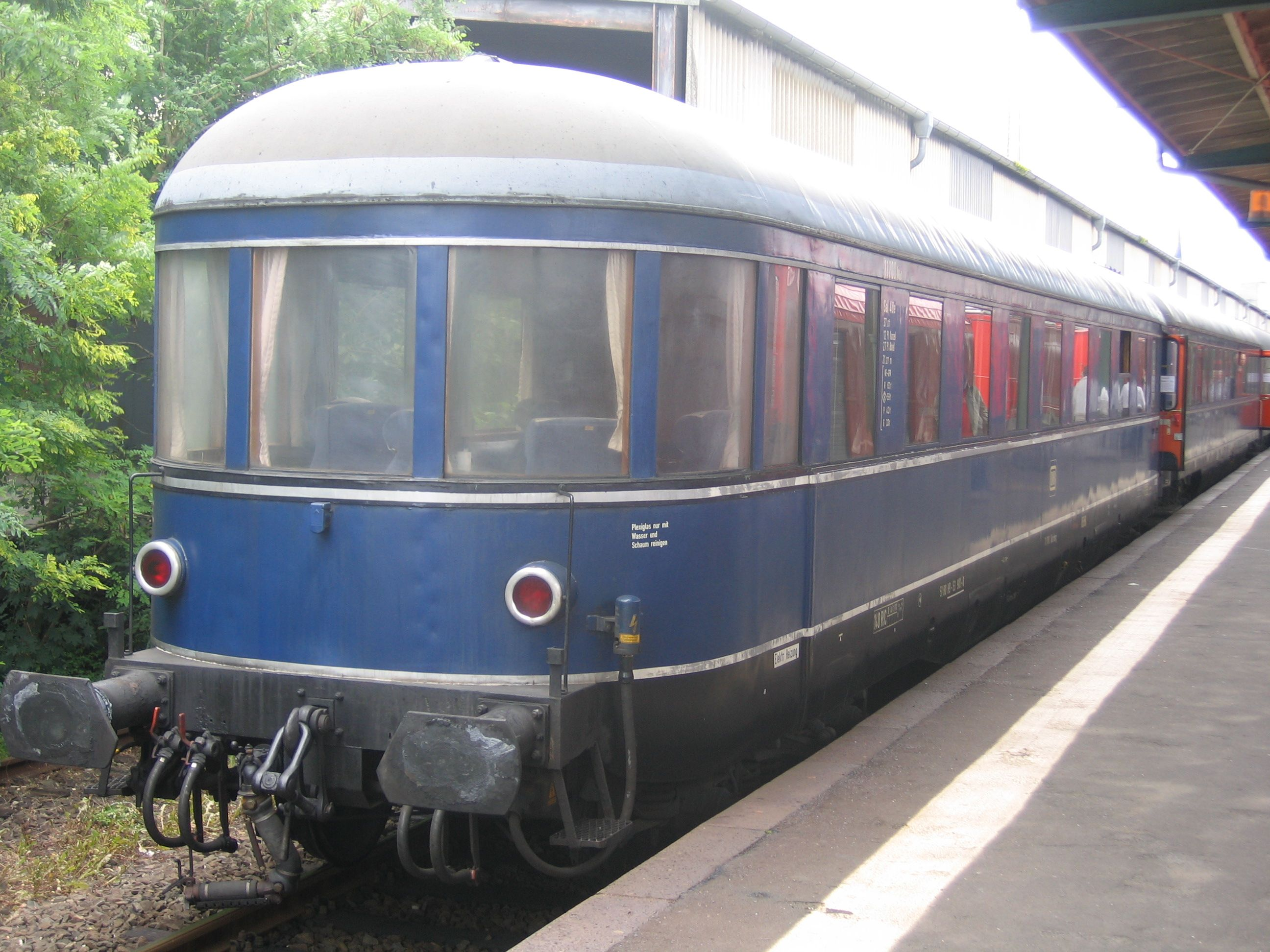
Observation car of the train running in the opposite direction to the Henschel-Wegmann rake in service with the Blauer Enzian

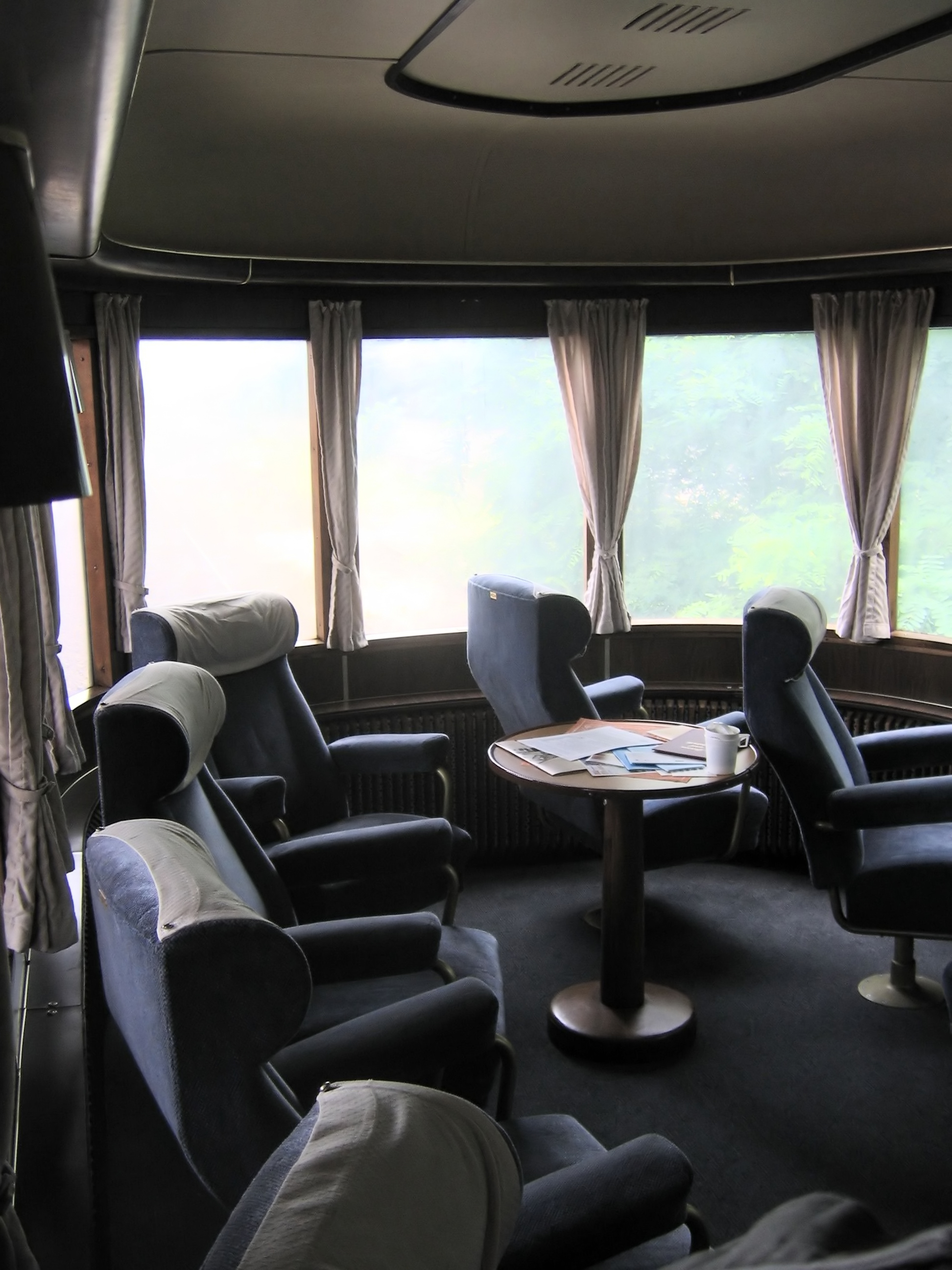
Observation compartment of the train running in the opposite direction to the Henschel-Wegmann rake in service with the Blauer Enzian

After the Second World War the coaches were taken over by the Deutsche Bundesbahn and, in 1954 after conversion by the firm of Wegmann, operated as a train with second class compartments. Later, following the internationally agreed changeover to a two-class system between 1956 and 1959, the coaches were operated as a first class train under the name Blauer Enzian (Blue Gentian or Gentiana verna), forming the long-distance express service F55/56 between Hamburg and Munich. The train offered the highest levels of comfort. Wegmann converted the former 3rd class compartments in pairs to create larger compartments and the interior was enhanced with swivel chairs. The five coaches of the historic train were only sufficient however for running a single train per day in one direction. The train in the other direction was therefore made up of two saloon cars (one of them from the Hermann Göring train), two unconverted F-Zug dining cars and a trailer car similar to those of the Henschel-Wegmann Train. From April 1959, however, only new, modern coaches were used. Despite all claims that one trailer car remains today, all five original coaches were retired and scrapped in 1962. The trailer car with its observation compartment, which has been incorrectly assumed to be the original trailer car, comes from the second Blauer Enzian train, that had been specifically built for that service. Today it is in the collection of the Nuremberg Transport Museum.

==== Locomotive 61 001 ====
At the end of the war, locomotive 61 001 found itself in the British Zone and was allocated to the Hanover locomotive depot. Between July 1945 and March 1946 it clocked up 40,000 kilometres in front of passenger trains. In 1947 a general inspection was completed, and on 23 October 1948 the engine was stationed in Bebra, where it was in regular service until May 1949. After a pause, it resumed work from November 1950 covering 3,000 to 10,000 kilometres per month. On 2 November 1951 the engine was badly damaged in an accident at Münster; as a result it was retired on 14 November 1952 and scrapped in 1957.

==== Locomotive 61 002 ====
Locomotive 61 002 remained in Dresden and was employed on passenger train duties. As a one-off it created problems for traffic operating staff. However, for the Test and Development Centre for Engineering (VES-M under Max Baumberg) it was of interest as a trial engine for speeds over 160 km/h. It was converted in 1961 by the Deutsche Reichsbahn of East Germany at the workshop in Meiningen into a high-speed trials locomotive with a tender and the running number 18 201. With a new-design boiler, outer cylinders from the trials locomotive, H 45 024, and a new welded inner cylinder (the original cylinders were designed for a steam pressure of 20 bar and had too small a bore for the new, 16 bar boiler) and the carrying axle from the high-pressure locomotive, H 45 024, she attained speeds of up to 180 km/h.

In 2002, number 18 201 was completely overhauled in the Meiningen Steam Locomotive Works and has since been in the possession of Dampf-Plus owned by Christian Goldschagg and Axel Zwingenberger.

== Stamps ==
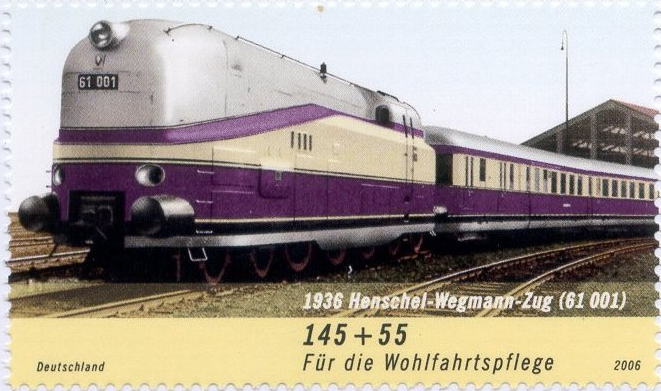
Charity stamp of the Henschel-Wegmann Train

On 5 October 2006 the German post office, Deutsche Post, issued a charity stamp series of four stamps, which included a stamp of the Henschel-Wegmann train for 145+55 Eurocents depicting locomotive 61 001.

== See also ==
There was another example of a streamlined train rake using the DRG Class 60 and the double-decker, streamlined, push-pull train on the Lübeck-Büchen railway.
