= DR 18 201 =

German high-speed steam locomotive

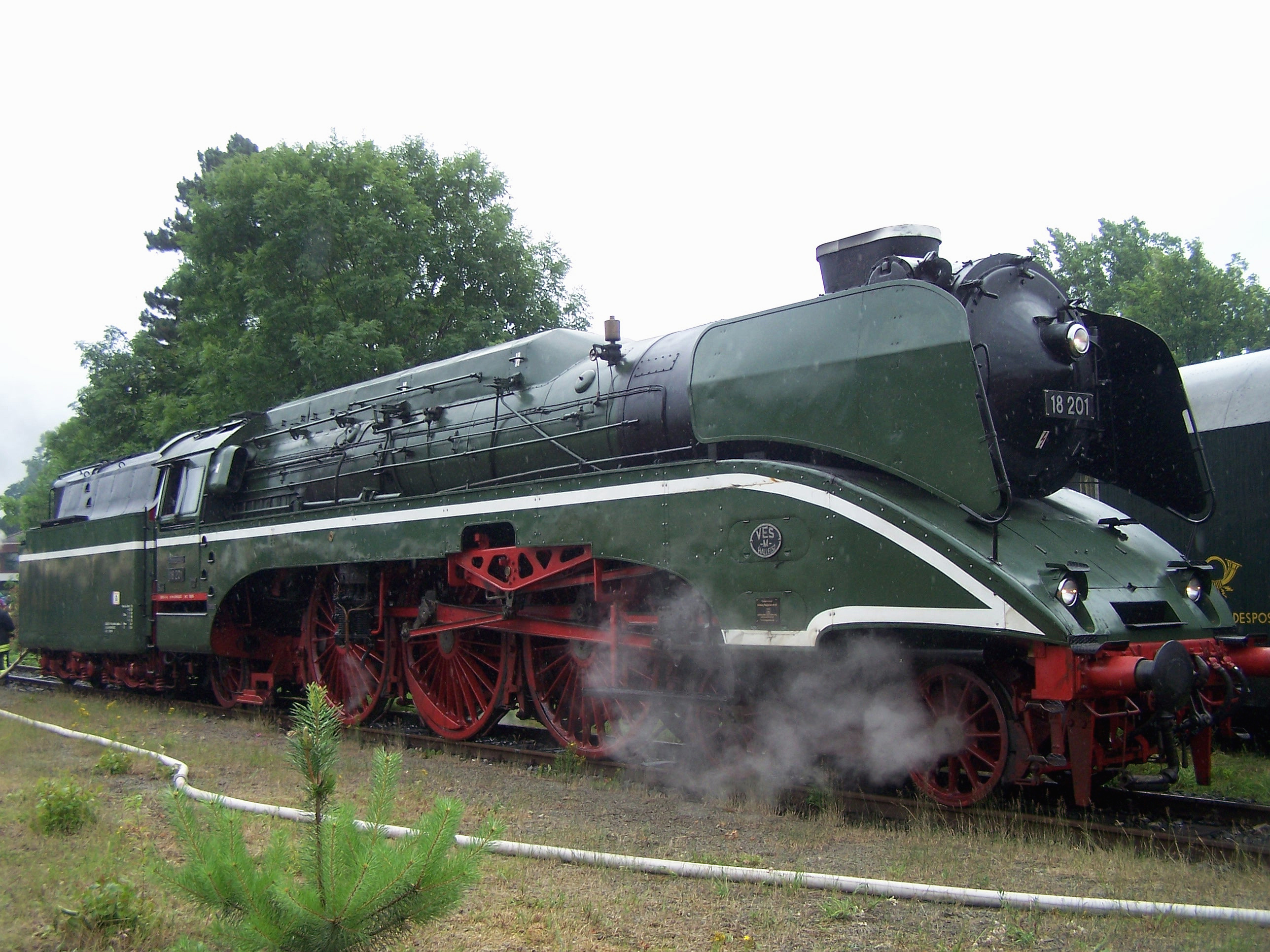
- 18 201 in June 2007
Type and origin
- Power type: Steam
- Builder: RAW Meiningen
- Serial number: 89
- Build date: 1961
- Total produced: 1
Specifications
- Configuration
  - Whyte: 4-6-2
  - UIC: 2′C1′ h3
  - German: S 36.20
- Driver: Divided: inner on 1st, outer on 2nd
- Gauge: 1,435 mm (4 ft 8 1/2 in)
- Leading dia.: 1,100 mm (3 ft 7 1/4 in)
- Driver dia.: 2,300 mm (7 ft 6 1/2 in)
- Trailing dia.: 1,250 mm (4 ft 1 1/4 in)
- Tender wheels: 1,000 mm (3 ft 3 3/8 in)
- Wheelbase
  - Axle spacing (Asymmetrical): 2,350 mm (7 ft 8 1/2 in) +; 2,100 mm (6 ft 10 5/8 in) +; 2,550 mm (8 ft 4 3/8 in) +; 2,550 mm (8 ft 4 3/8 in) +; 3,835 mm (12 ft 7 in) =
  - Engine: 13,385 mm (43 ft 11 in)
  - Tender: 1,900 mm (6 ft 2 3/4 in) +; 1,900 mm (6 ft 2 3/4 in) +; 1,900 mm (6 ft 2 3/4 in) =; 5,700 mm (18 ft 8 3/8 in)
  - incl. tender: 21,510 mm (70 ft 6 7/8 in)
- Length
  - Over headstocks: 23,855 mm (78 ft 3 1/8 in)
  - Over buffers: 25,145 mm (82 ft 6 in)
- Height: 4,550 mm (14 ft 11 1/8 in)
- Axle load: 20.7 t (20.4 long tons; 22.8 short tons)
- Adhesive weight: 61.2 t (60.2 long tons; 67.5 short tons)
- Empty weight: 102.5 t (100.9 long tons; 113.0 short tons) (without tender)
- Service weight: 113.6 t (111.8 long tons; 125.2 short tons)
- Total weight: 186.8 t (183.8 long tons; 205.9 short tons)
- Tender type: 2′2′ T 34 + additional tender
- Fuel type: Oil
- Fuel capacity: 13.5 m^{3} (3,000 imp gal; 3,600 US gal)
- Water cap.: 34 m^{3} (7,500 imp gal; 9,000 US gal)
- Firebox
  - Grate area: 4.23 m^{2} (45.5 sq ft)
- Boiler
  - Pitch: 3,200 mm (10 ft 6 in)
  - Tube plates: 5,700 mm (18 ft 8 3/8 in)
  - Small tubes: 54 mm (2 1/8 in), 112 off
  - Large tubes: 143 mm (5 5/8 in), 36 off
- Boiler pressure: 16 bar (16.3 kgf/cm^{2}; 232 psi)
- Heating surface
  - Firebox: 21.3 m^{2} (229 sq ft)
  - Tubes: 98.3 m^{2} (1,058 sq ft)
  - Flues: 86.7 m^{2} (933 sq ft)
  - Total surface: 206.3 m^{2} (2,221 sq ft)
- Superheater
  - Heating area: 83.8 m^{2} (902 sq ft)
- Cylinders: Three
- Cylinder size: 520 mm × 660 mm (20 1/2 in × 26 in)
- Valve gear: Heusinger (Walschaerts)
- Train heating: Steam
- Loco brake: Air
- Train brakes: Air
- Safety systems: PZB
- Couplers: Screw Links
Performance figures
- Maximum speed: 182 km/h (113 mph)
- Indicated power: 2,150 PS (1,580 kW; 2,120 hp)
Career
- Operators: Deutsche Reichsbahn
- Numbers: 18 201; 02 0201-0 from 1970

The German express locomotive, number 18 201 of the Deutsche Reichsbahn in East Germany, appeared in 1960–61 at Meiningen Steam Locomotive Works as a conversion of the Henschel-Wegmann train locomotive 61 002, the tender from 44 468 and parts of H 45 024 and Class 41. It is the fastest operational steam locomotive in the world.

== Origin ==
The motivation for the conversion was firstly that, as a one-off, locomotive 61 002 could not really be used for scheduled services, and secondly that the research institute at VES-M Halle urgently needed locomotives that could do at least 160 km/h in order to test passenger coaches.

For the conversion a DR Class 22 new-design boiler, parts of the unsuccessful high pressure locomotive, H 45 024, (outside cylinders, trailing wheels and rear section of the locomotive frame) as well as the tender of locomotive 44 468 were used. The inside cylinder of the three-cylinder engine was not however taken from 61 002, rather a new one was made. Other technical improvements were a Riggenbach counter-pressure brake and a Giesl ejector. The locomotive was streamlined at the front and over the boiler fittings.

The new locomotive was given its number to commemorate the first German locomotive with a 4-6-2 ('Pacific') wheel arrangement, the Baden IV f of the Baden State Railways (later the DRG Class 18.2).

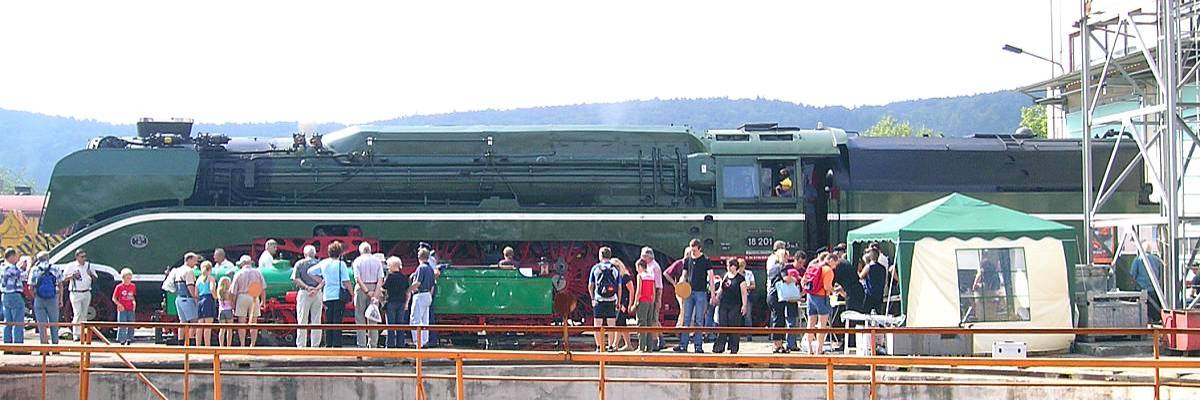
Locomotive 18 201 from the side

In 1967 number 18 201 was converted to oil-firing. After the changeover to computerised numbers the engine was given the number 02 0201–0. On 11 October 1972 during a trial run it attained a top speed of 182.4 km/h or 113.3 mph. As a result, it was the fastest, operational steam locomotive in the world, and also holds the world record for the biggest driving wheels (2.30 m in diameter) ever to be fitted to an engine with a 4-6-2 wheel arrangement.

When not required for test runs, locomotive 18 201 was also put in charge of scheduled express trains until well into the 1970s.

== Duties as a heritage locomotive ==
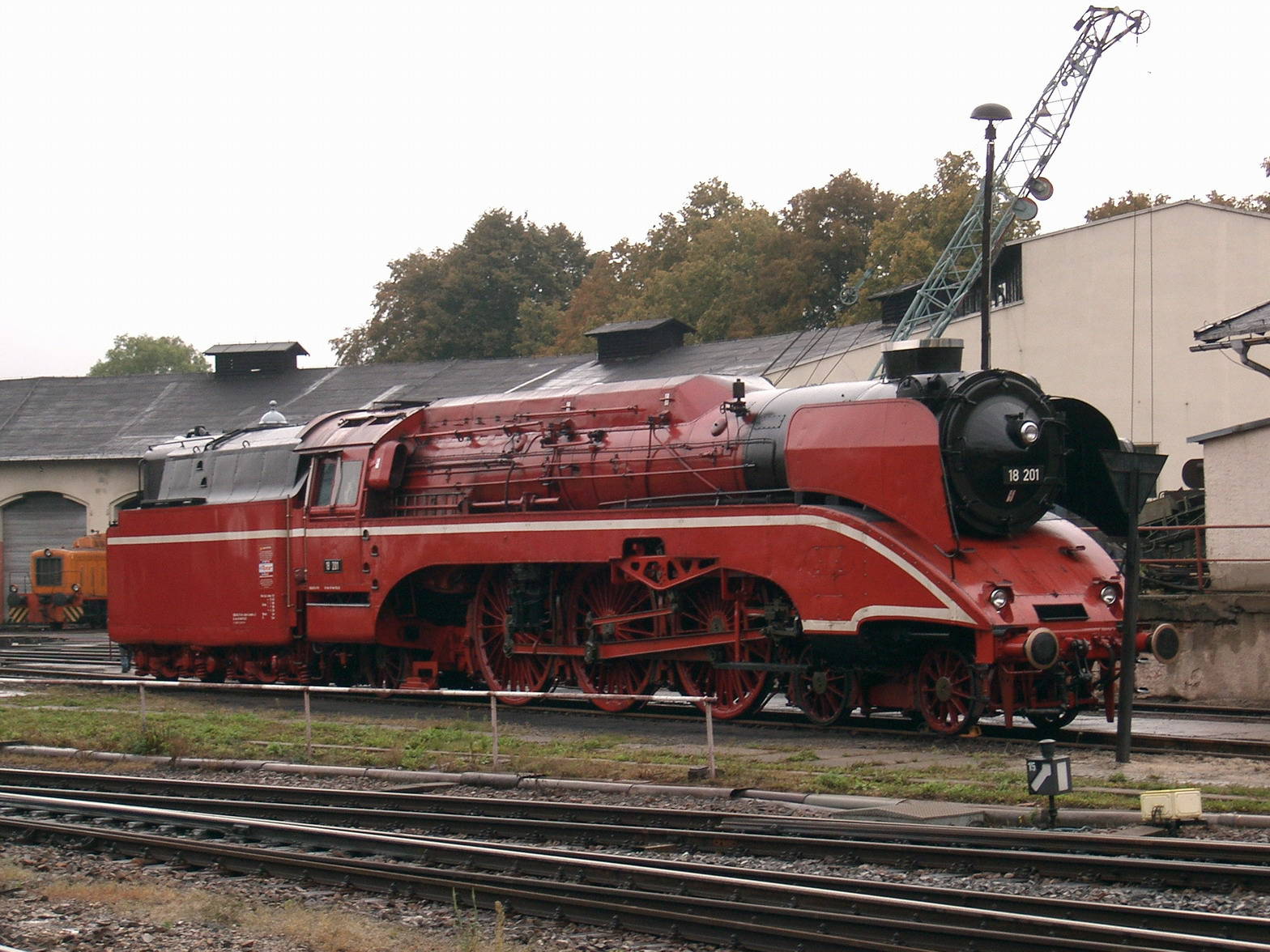
18 201 on 25 September 2004 in red livery

Since 1980 the locomotive has mainly been employed to haul heritage and special trains, often with a second tender, in order to be able to complete long-distance runs without the need to replenish its water. At its birthplace in Meiningen Steam Locomotive Works the engine was handed over to the firm of Dampf-Plus on 4 April 2002 having been completely overhauled. Originally sporting a green livery with white stripes, the engine was repainted between 30 April 2002 and 10 July 2005 in a special red livery (RAL 3003, ruby red) sponsored by the model railway manufacturer, Roco. Today it is once again painted in its traditional green colour (RAL 6020, chromium oxide green).

== 18 201 today ==
Locomotive 18 201 belongs to Christian Goldschagg and Axel Zwingenberger, owners of the Dampf-Plus company. Up to January 2006, the locomotive was the subject of a dispute between its owners and the Deutsche Bahn AG, and a sale abroad was contemplated (even the US and Canada were discussed).

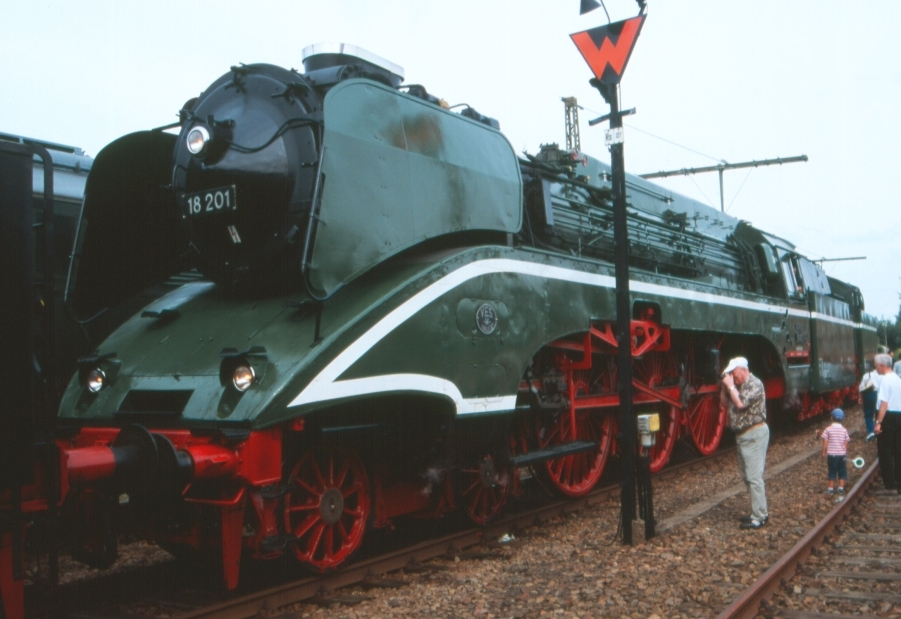
18 201 in August 2005 – once more in green

18 201's last special run before took place on 16 July 2005 followed by several months when it was out of service. The special red livery was - as always intended - replaced by the original green paintwork.

On 31 January 2006 the newspaper, Sächsische Zeitung, reported that the guardians of this historic Halle monument were permitting the engine to be stationed elsewhere for a length period; but this did not mean that its export was planned. Meanwhile, the locomotive is stabled at Nossen.

At the celebration of the Schiefe Ebene's 160 years in September 2008 organised by the German Steam Locomotive Museum at Neuenmarkt, 18 201 was finally back in action.

At the end of 2018, all deadlines for the chassis and boiler of the listed locomotive 18 201 expired after eight years since the last general inspection. On September 1 there was a big farewell trip. The locomotive was initially stored in an inaccessible, preserved condition in a locomotive shed. On August 14, 2019, 18 201 was sold to WFL GmbH & Co. KG, Potsdam, due to the closure of Dampf-Plus GmbH.

In November 2019, the new owner, WFL, had the locomotive transferred to the Neustrelitz AW to deal with partial trades, including the braking systems of the locomotive and tender, as part of the necessary statutory general inspection for recommissioning. In September 2020 it returned from the AW Neustrelitz to its home BW Nossen, where the further work of the main inspection to obtain the new approval in the route service is being carried out. After successful approval for operations, the locomotive is available again for special trips.

== See also ==
- List of East German Deutsche Reichsbahn locomotives and railbuses
- List of DRG locomotives and railbuses
- List of preserved steam locomotives in Germany
