= VES-M Halle =

Railway research department in East Germany

The Versuchs- und Entwicklungsstelle Maschinenwirtschaft in Halle, Germany, (VES-M Halle) was a railway research and development department working for the engineering head office of the Deutsche Reichsbahn (DR) in East Germany after the Second World War. It worked closely with the Railways Institute (Institut für Eisenbahnwesen).

Amongst other things, all rolling stock intended for deployment on the DR railway network, whether built in Germany or abroad, was thoroughly tested here. Loading tests with measurement trains on the open line, starting tests on the Berlin outer ring and other task were carried out by this special division of the Deutsche Reichsbahn.

Even the fastest, still operational steam locomotive, the DR 18 201, which used to have the DR number 02 0201-0, was used by VES-M Halle before the merger of the DR and DB. It was designed here for high-speed trials and was made, to a large extent, by converting existing engines and components.

For high speed runs an electric locomotive class, the E 18 was also used. The 'Germanisation' of diesel locomotives of Russian and Romanian origin was also carried out here.

The first head of the VES-M in 1951 was the locomotive engineer, Max Baumberg.

In 2008, a permanent exhibition about the VES-M Halle was opened at the DB Museum in Halle.
