= Blauer Enzian =

German express train service

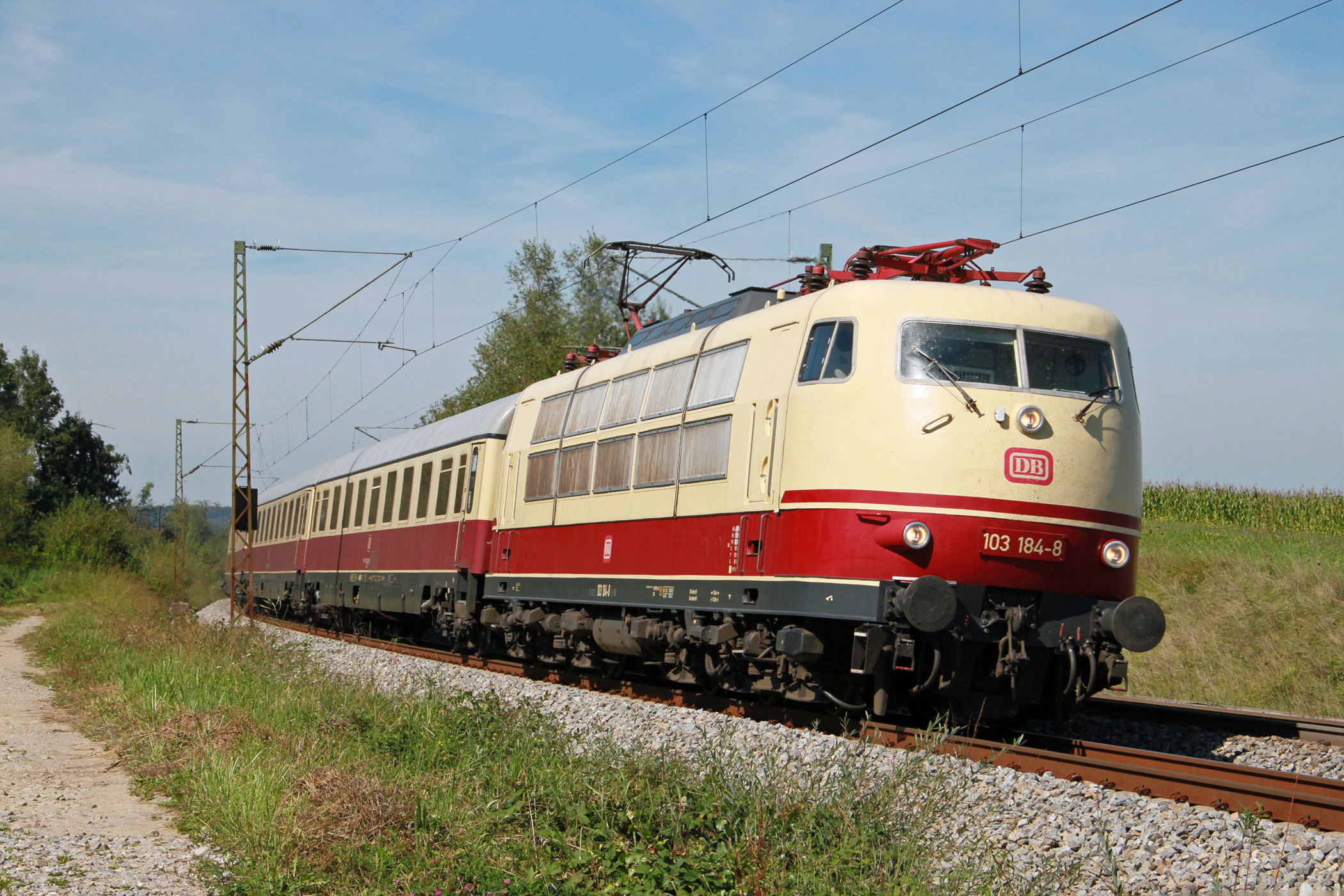
- DB Class 103 on the Munich–Rosenheim railway

Overview
- Service type: EuroCity (EC) (1987–2002, 2017–); Former: InterCity (IC) (1979–1987); Trans Europ Express (TEE) (1965–1979); Fernschnellzug (F) (1951–1965)
- Status: Active
- Locale: Germany; Austria
- First service: 1951
- Former operators: ÖBB; Former: Deutsche Bundesbahn / Deutsche Bahn (DB)

Route
- Termini: Frankfurt (Main) Hbf (since 2017); Former: Dortmund Hbf (1979-2002); Hamburg-Altona (1951-1979); Klagenfurt Hbf (since 1969); Former: Zell am See (1970-1973); München Hbf (1951-1969)
- Service frequency: Daily
- Train numbers: EC 112/113 (since 2017); Former: EC 114/115 (1991-2002); EC 20/21 (1987-1991)

Technical
- Track gauge: 1,435 mm (4 ft 8 1/2 in)
- Electrification: 15 kV AC, 16.7 Hz (Germany, Austria)
Route map
- Routes of Blauer Enzian: TEE 1970 (red), IC 1979 (blue), EC 1991 (green)

The Blauer Enzian is a named express train service that currently runs between Frankfurt in Germany and Klagenfurt in Austria. Introduced in 1951, it originally ran via the German North–South railway line between Hamburg and Munich. Labelled as an international Trans Europ Express (TEE) train, it also linked with Zell am See and Klagenfurt in Austria from 1969. Trains were operated by the Deutsche Bundesbahn (DB) and its Deutsche Bahn successor, from 1970 also by the Austrian Federal Railways (ÖBB).

The train's classification and formation (consist) varied over time. Since 1981, trains run from Dortmund to Klagenfurt, categorised as EuroCity service from 1987. It ceased to be a named train in 2002, but was revived in 2017 as an ÖBB EuroCity from Frankfurt to Klagenfurt, with through coaches onwards to Zagreb in Croatia.

== Name ==
In 1953 the train was named after the mountain flower Blue Gentian (blau, German for blue, and Enzian, the German vernacular for Gentian, species Gentiana verna; German: Frühlings-Enzian). The name was the result of a prize competition initiated by Deutsche Bundesbahn among its passengers. Similar to the Edelweiss express train service introduced in 1928, it was associated with alpinism and the Alps.

== Route ==
Over the years, the Blauer Enzian's termini and route were altered so significantly that there is no section of line over which it always travelled. However, the train always either originated, terminated, or reversed direction, at München Hauptbahnhof.

=== Fernzug ===
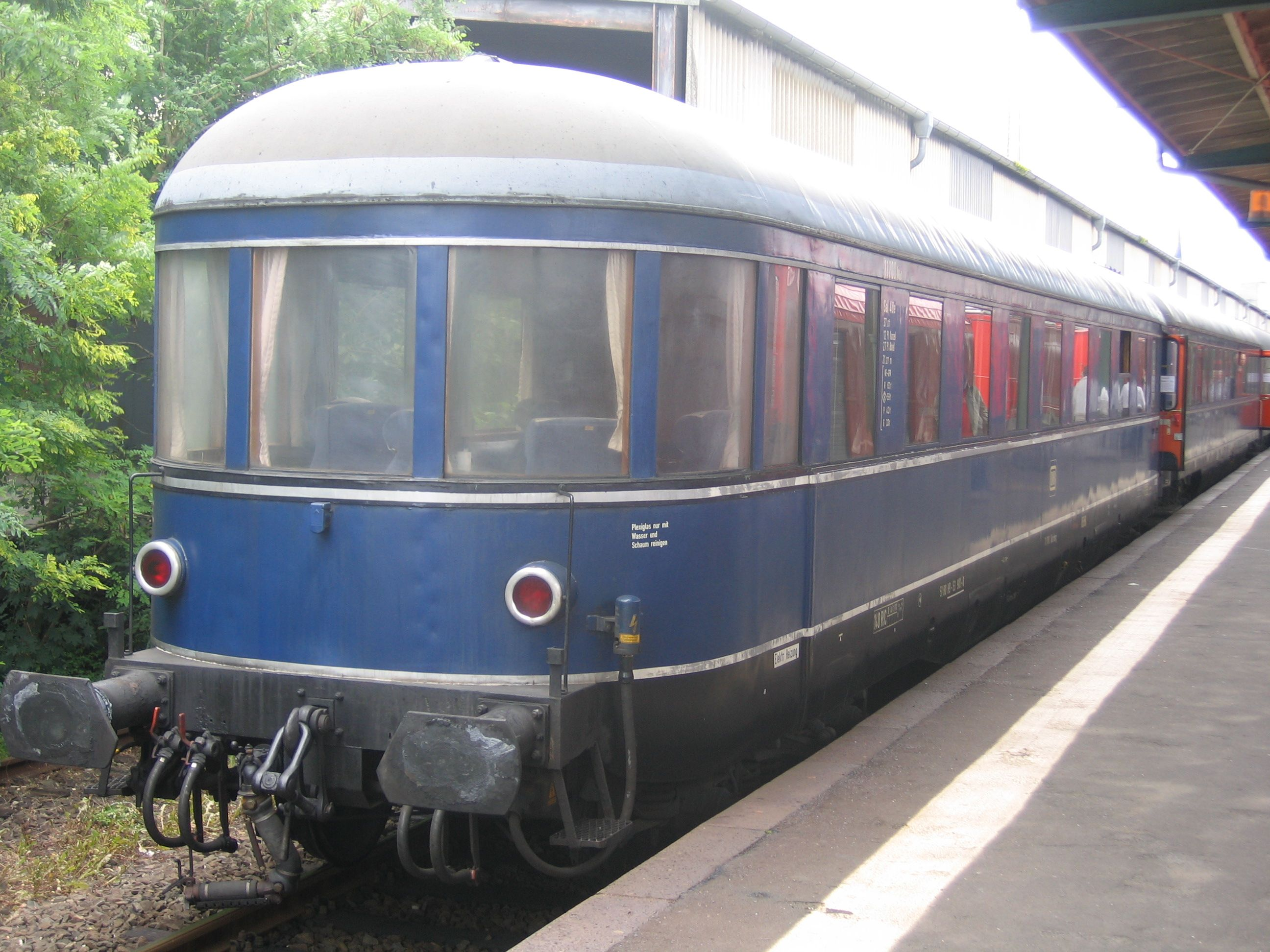
Observation car of one of a 1953 pair of Blauer Enzian trains

In 1951, the West German Deutsche Bundesbahn announced the introduction of the Blauer Enzian as part of the then-new Fernzug network. It originally was planned that the North-South train would begin service on 1 July 1951, as FT 55/56. However, the FernTriebwagen (long-distance multiple unit) trainsets planned for the new service were not yet available by then, and the train instead entered service in autumn 1951 or later with normal carriages.

The route of the F 55/56 express train, from Hamburg-Altona station to München Hauptbahnhof, included that of the first German high-speed railway, built later. Initially the train consisted of pre-war streamlined Reichsbahn Schürzenwagen carriages and a UIC-X prototype, hauled by steam locomotives of class 01 and diesel locomotives of class V 200, on electrified sections also by E 10 and pre-war DRG E 18 locomotives. In 1953 Deutsche Bundesbahn also performed extensive practical trials using a US EMD MRS-1 diesel-electric locomotive.

From December 1953 until 1959 the former Henschel-Wegmann Train was used, which was extensively restored including an observation car and former Rheingold 1928 diners. A second adjusted Blauer Enzian train was specifically built for the service running in the opposite direction.

=== Trans Europ Express ===
After the electrification of the railway lines around Hamburg in 1965, the Blauer Enzian was upgraded to a domestic Trans Europ Express. The train began using TEE coaches hauled by the prototypes of the class E 03 (later class 103) high-speed locomotives. In 1968, the Blauer Enzian was the first German train with a scheduled operating speed of 200 km/h.

In 1969, through coaches to Austria were introduced, with a final destination of Klagenfurt Hauptbahnhof via Salzburg and the Tauern Railway line. These cars were hauled by an ordinary express train south of Munich, still called Blauer Enzian and first-class-only, but not designated as a TEE.

In 1970, the full Trans Europ Express route renumbered TEE 80/81 was extended to Austria and the train was split in Rosenheim, with one part going to Klagenfurt and the other to Zell am See via Kufstein and Wörgl. Although the Zell am See service had disappointing passenger numbers, it remained in the timetable to serve the expected tourists related to the 1972 Summer Olympics. In 1973, the Zell am See service was withdrawn.

In the late 1970s, the Blauer Enzian was one of only three TEE trains running within Austria, the others being the Mediolanum and the Prinz Eugen. Until 1977, the TEE Bavaria also ran through Austria, but for a distance of less than 20 km.

=== Intercity/EuroCity ===
On 27 May 1979, the Blauer Enzian was downgraded to a two-class Intercity, no longer serving Hamburg, but instead, running southbound as Dortmund – Munich – Klagenfurt and northbound as Klagenfurt – Munich – Dortmund – Braunschweig. The TEE service between Hamburg and Munich was taken over by the TEE Diamant. By 1981, the northbound route was also terminating in Dortmund.

On 31 May 1987, the Blauer Enzian became part of the newly introduced international EuroCity network, with train number EC20 northbound and EC21 southbound (later renumbered EC12/13). Interesting was the change of through coaches among EC Blauer Enzian, EXP Dachstein (Lindau–Graz–Lindau), EC Transalpin (Basel–Vienna/Graz/Klagenfurt) in summer 1990, in Schwarzach St Veit and Bischofshofen. The EC Blauer Enzian conveyed through coaches Dortmund–Klagenfurt/Graz/Ljubljana.

Until the opening of the first German high-speed railway on 2 June 1991, the route remained unchanged. On 2 June 1991, the route between Mainz and Augsburg was changed, to run via Mannheim, Heidelberg, and Stuttgart instead of Frankfurt, Nuremberg, and Würzburg – but still running Dortmund–Klagenfurt overall – and the train was renumbered to EC114 northbound and EC115 southbound. The name Blauer Enzian was abandoned from 14 December 2002.

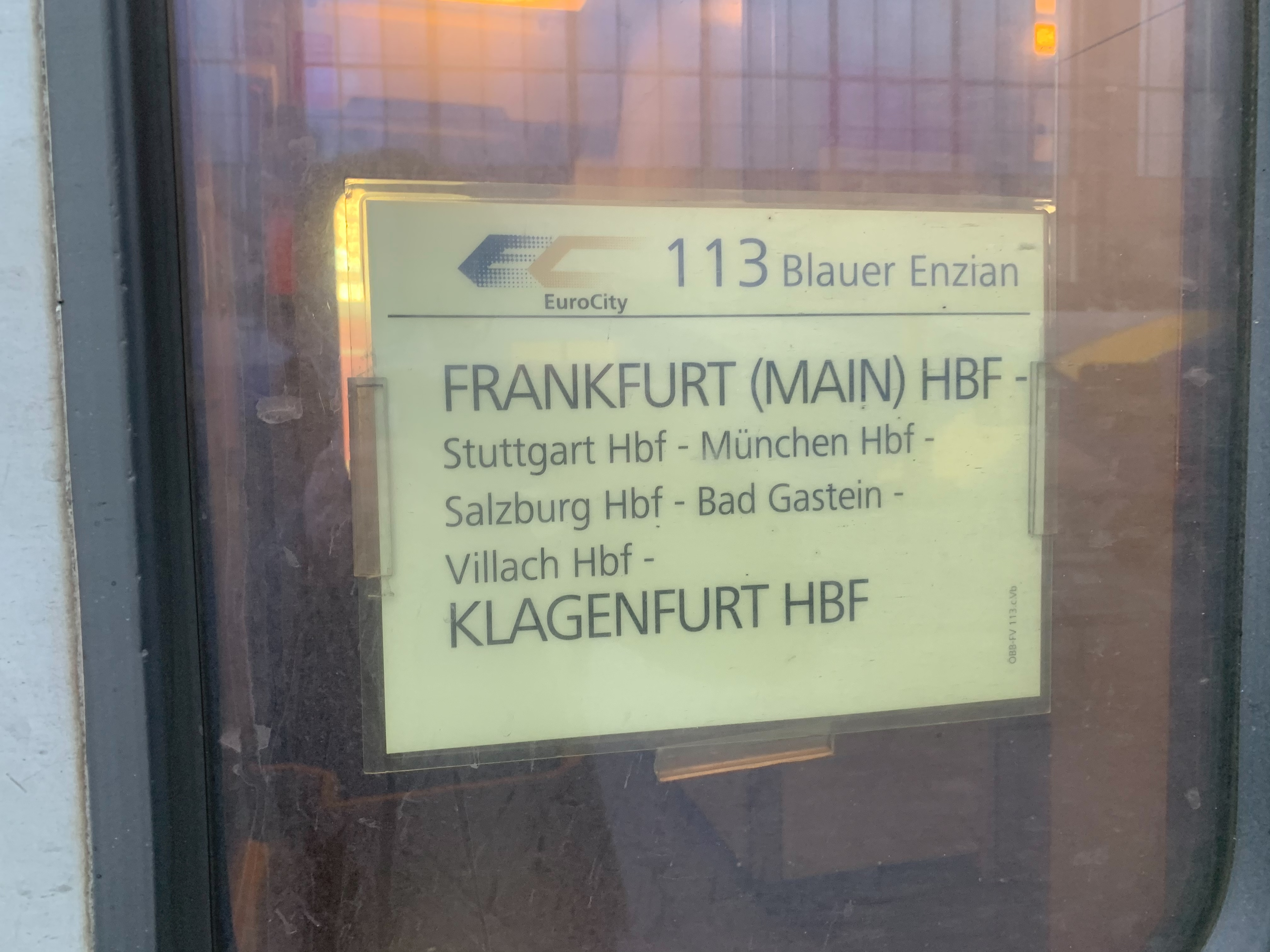
Revived Blauer Enzian

The name was revived in 2017 for the Frankfurt to Klagenfurt service, EC 112/113. This train meets the EC 212/213 Mimara at Villach and exchanges through coaches for services onwards to Ljubljana and Zagreb. The Dortmund to Klagenfurt service, still numbered EC 114/115, was renamed Wörthersee.

== See also ==
- History of rail transport in Germany
- History of rail transport in Austria
- List of named passenger trains of Europe
