= Nordgau =

The Nordgau (from the Germanic for "northern region") can refer to two distinct areas:

- Nordgau (Alsace), the Alsatian Nordgau, the medieval County of Nordgau, the northern part of Alsace
- Margraviate of the Nordgau, the Bavarian Nordgau in the area of the Upper Palatinate

== See also ==
- Bavarian B V, a steam locomotive, one surviving example being the Nordgau
