= Meiningen Steam Locomotive Works =

Railway workshops in Meiningen, Thuringia, Germany

Coordinates: 50°34′55″N 10°25′14″E

The Meiningen Steam Locomotive Works (German: Dampflokwerk Meiningen) is a railway repair shop in Meiningen, Germany. It is owned by Deutsche Bahn and has specialised in the maintenance of museum steam locomotives since 1990, having extensive experience in maintaining steam engines. Today, customers of the factory include railway museums and museum railways from all over Europe. The factory is responsible for the safety inspections of all operational German steam locomotives.

Dampflokwerk Meiningen is the only facility in mainland Europe capable of constructing new locomotive boilers up to modern standards of construction, performance, and safety. The newly built British steam locomotive 60163 Tornado that was delivered in 2008 had her all-steel, high-performance boiler made at Meiningen because the A1 Steam Locomotive Trust required their boiler to meet then current EU safety standards.

== History ==
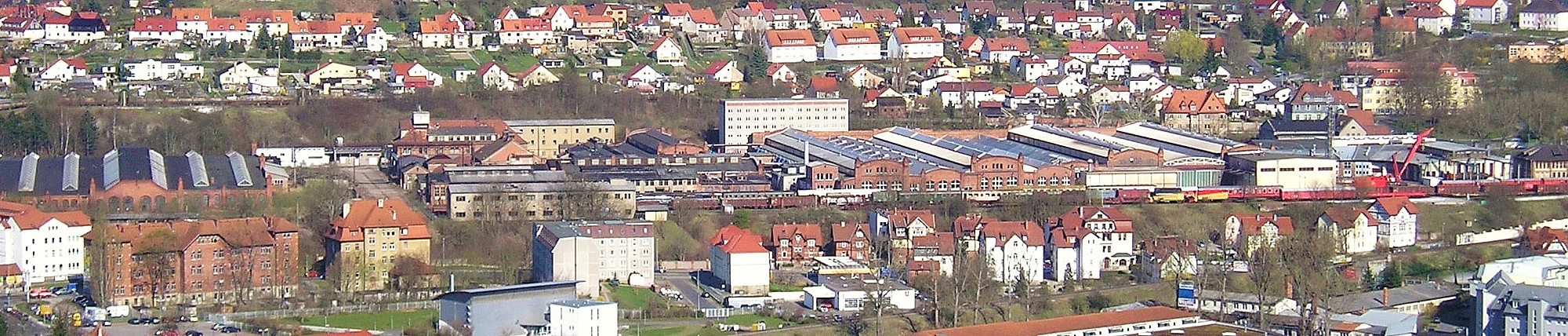
View of the factory

In 1863 the Werra Railway (Werrabahn) built a locomotive repair shop opposite Meiningen station, which became a main workshop for the Prussian state railways in 1902. In 1910, construction of a new building on the present site was begun due to the lack of space at the original location. On 2 March 1914, the workshop was opened with 420 employees. From that time to the present day it has carried out the repair and maintenance of steam locomotives of all types. By 1918 the number of employees had risen to 2,200. From 1919 onwards, the shop was operated by the Deutsche Reichsbahn. After the foundation of the Deutsche Reichsbahn-Gesellschaft in 1924, it was renamed the 'Meiningen Reichsbahn Repair Depot' (Reichsbahnausbesserungswerk Meiningen or RAW Meiningen). From 1925 the new Einheitsdampflokomotiven were repaired and inspected too, mainly those of classes 01, 02, 43 and 44. In the 1930s an average of 60 locomotives a month were repaired; during the Second World War this rose to 87 per month. On 18 April 1945 the factory was occupied by the United States Army and on 21 April around 400 employees began work again. By the end of 1946 the number of workers had risen to just under 3,000. In 1951 nine employees lost their lives when there was a boiler explosion on a DRG Class 95 locomotive in the boiler testing shop (Anheizhaus); a passer-by in a nearby street was also killed. The boiler landed in the garden of the neighbouring hospital.

In the 1960s, construction began on new snow ploughs for the DR in East Germany as well as the conversion of steam locomotives to oil-firing. At the same time the refurbishment of diesel locomotives was taken on. The number of employees hovered around 2,000. In 1961 the former streamliner, 61 002, was converted by the factory into the high-speed, trial locomotive, 18 201, which is still operational today. This engine reached a top speed of 180 km/h and is currently the fastest, operational steam locomotive in the world. In 1981 the construction of fireless locomotives and S-Bahn bogies began, whilst the repair of steam locomotives steadily waned.

After the merger of the DB and DR in 1994 into the Deutsche Bahn AG, there was a drastic cutback in the workforce. Today there are only 120 men in the factory. Since 1995, under the name of Meiningen Steam Locomotive Works (Dampflokwerk Meiningen), the factory has become a European specialist for the refurbishment of steam locomotives of all classes, the customer base of which includes railway companies as well as technical museums and railway heritage societies. In 1995 a major project was begun for a private investor. The former monument locomotive, ex-DB 012 102-4 (oil) from Bebra, now streamlined steam locomotive number 01 1102, also known as the "Blue-Lady“, was completely overhauled from 1994 to 1996 and delivered to the owner, Johannes Klings, on 1 March 1996. It is a piece of history and, at the same time, an example of the quality and construction capability of the ex DR repair shop and the present day steam locomotive works. In 2002, locomotive 18 201 which the workshop had rebuilt, was completely overhauled again and transferred to its new owner Dampf-Plus.

Today the steam locomotive works is a centre of attraction for steam locomotive enthusiasts. In June 2006 the new boiler for the 60163 Tornado locomotive was delivered. Tornado is a new British steam locomotive built to the same plans as those of the LNER Class A1 ('Peppercorn') series from the immediate post-war years, and noted for its distinctive conical shape. From April to October 2007 the ADLER, a 1935 replica of the first German steam locomotive, was rebuilt in Meiningen after it had been badly damaged by the fire at the Nuremberg Transport Museum's roundhouse at Nuremberg West locomotive depot on 17 October 2005. The Locomotive Works is also building a new narrow gauge steam locomotive for the Mecklenburg line, Molli Spa Railway (Bäderbahn Molli), the first new steam engine in Germany for 50 years.

In 2010 the company gained much notoriety in Australia after the newly built boiler for NSW locomotive 3801 had to be returned and reconstructed on two separate occasions after manufacturing and size related defects were found

== Images ==
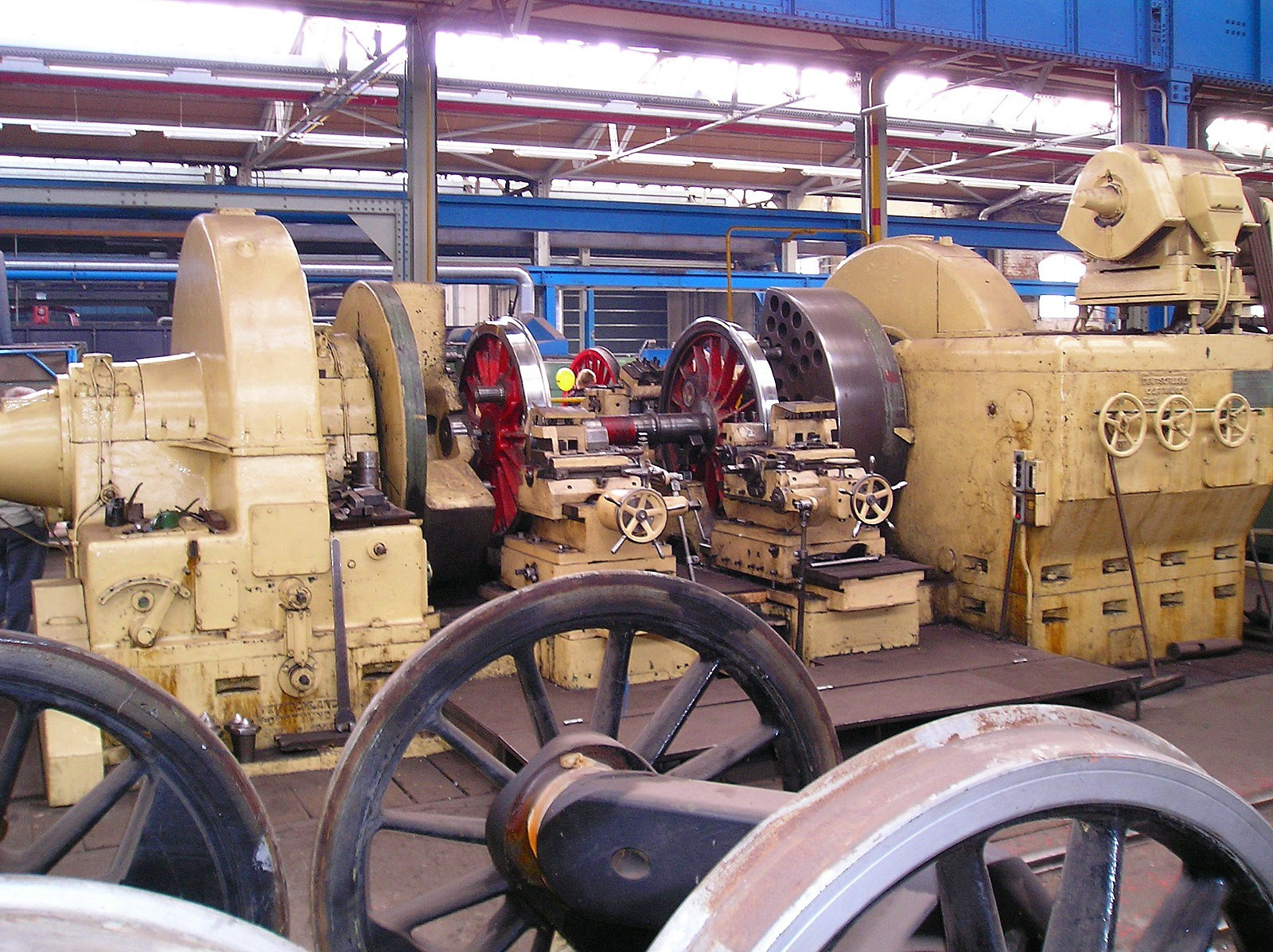
A wheelset turning lathe

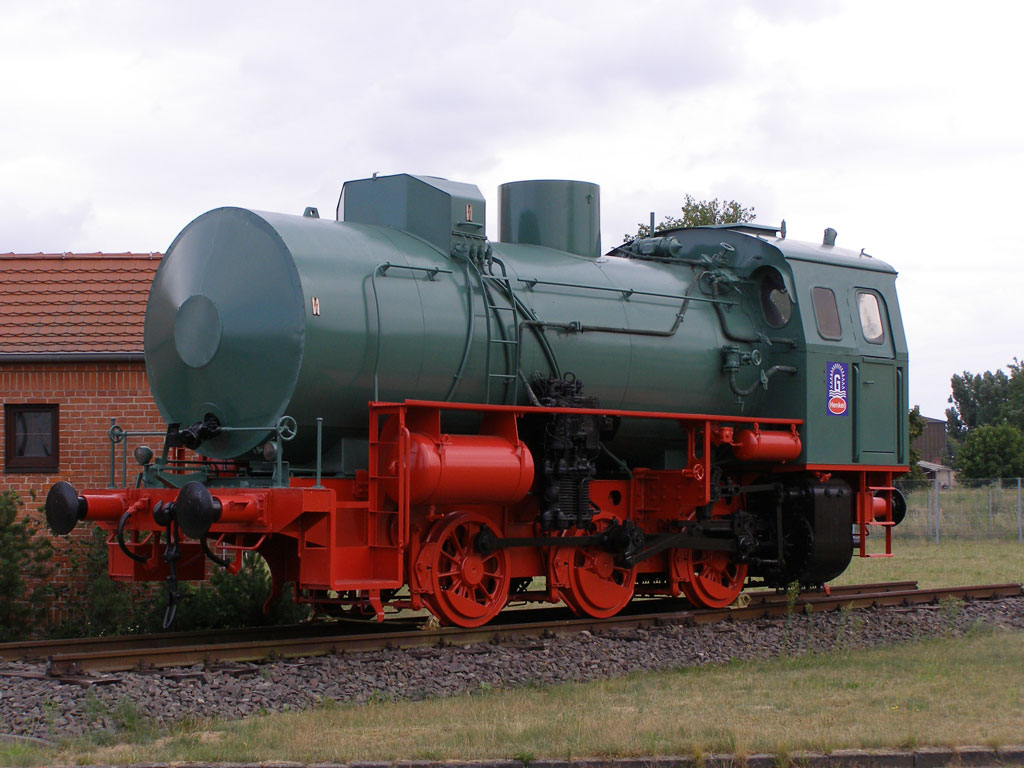
Meiningen fireless locomotive

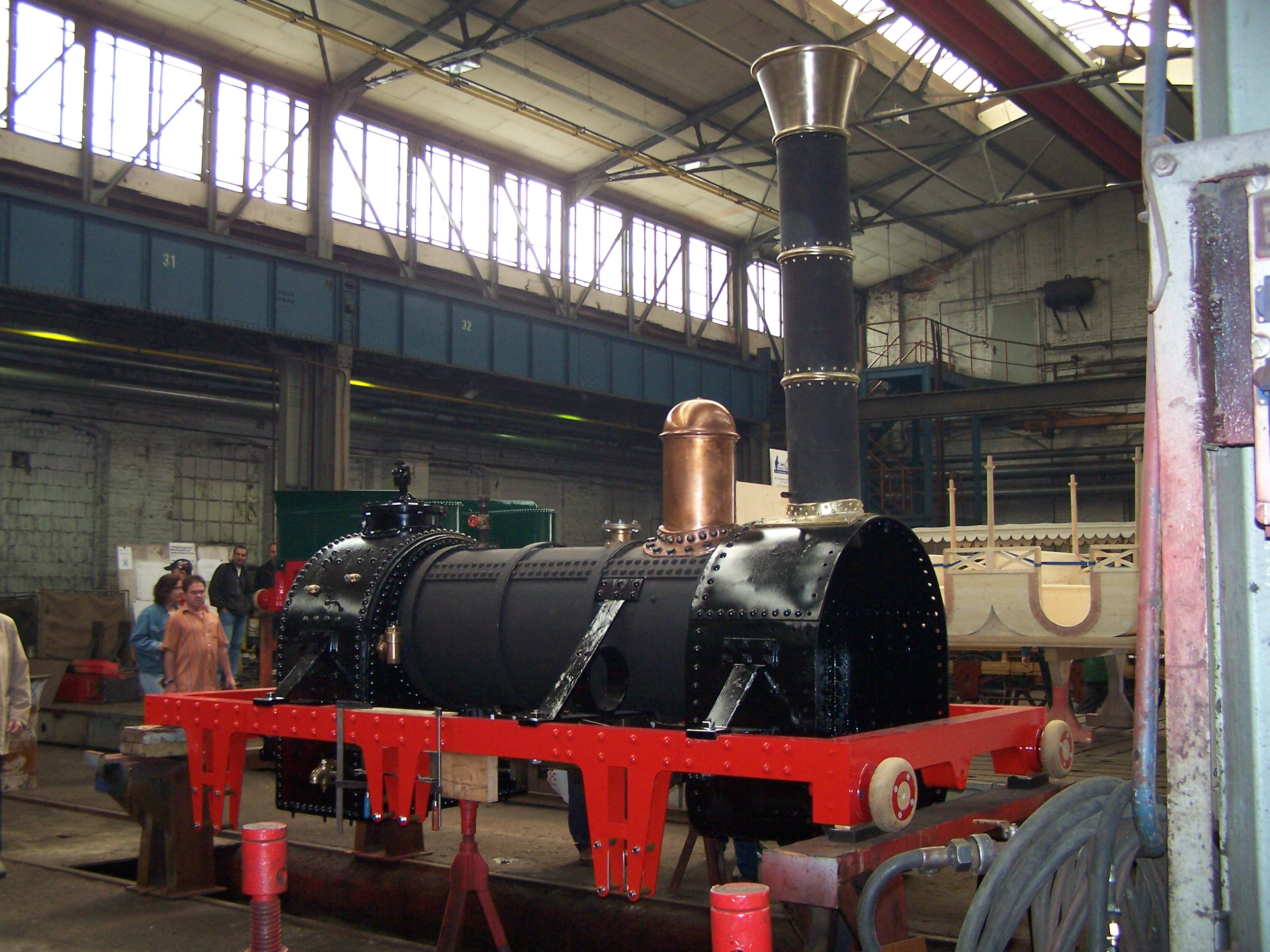
ADLER rebuild, 2007 Steam Festival

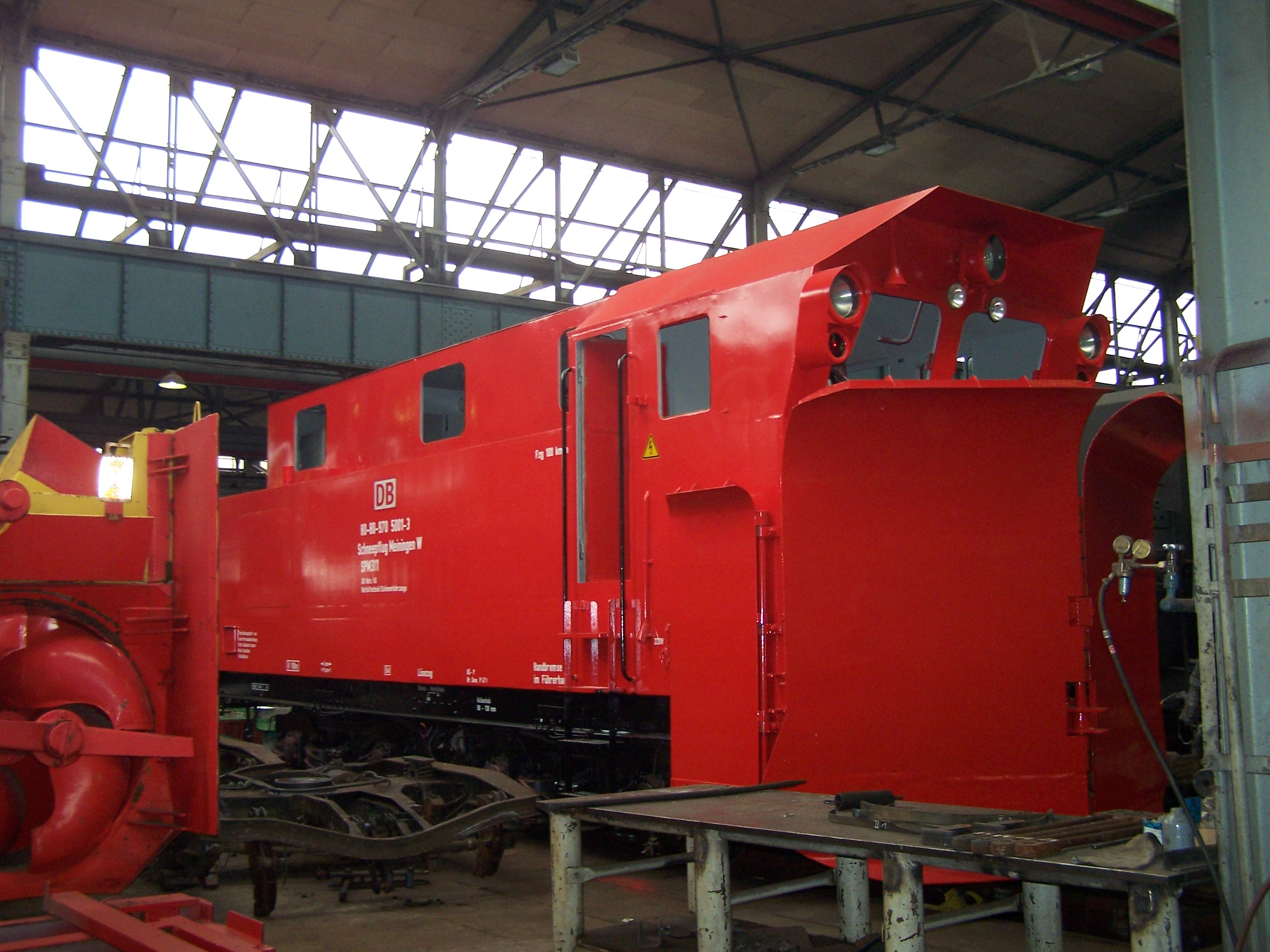
"Meiningen" snow plough in the workshop, 2007 Steam Festival

== Events ==
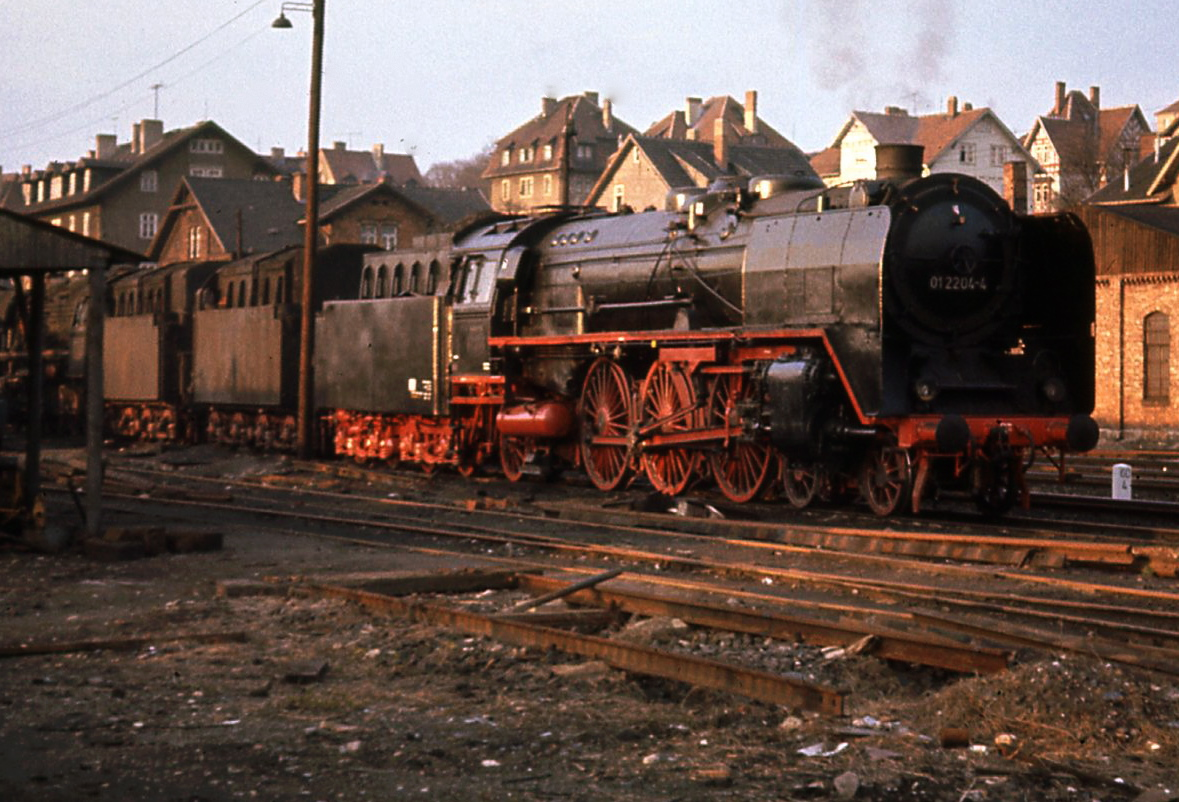
001 2204-4 ex-works at Meiningen, Easter 1972

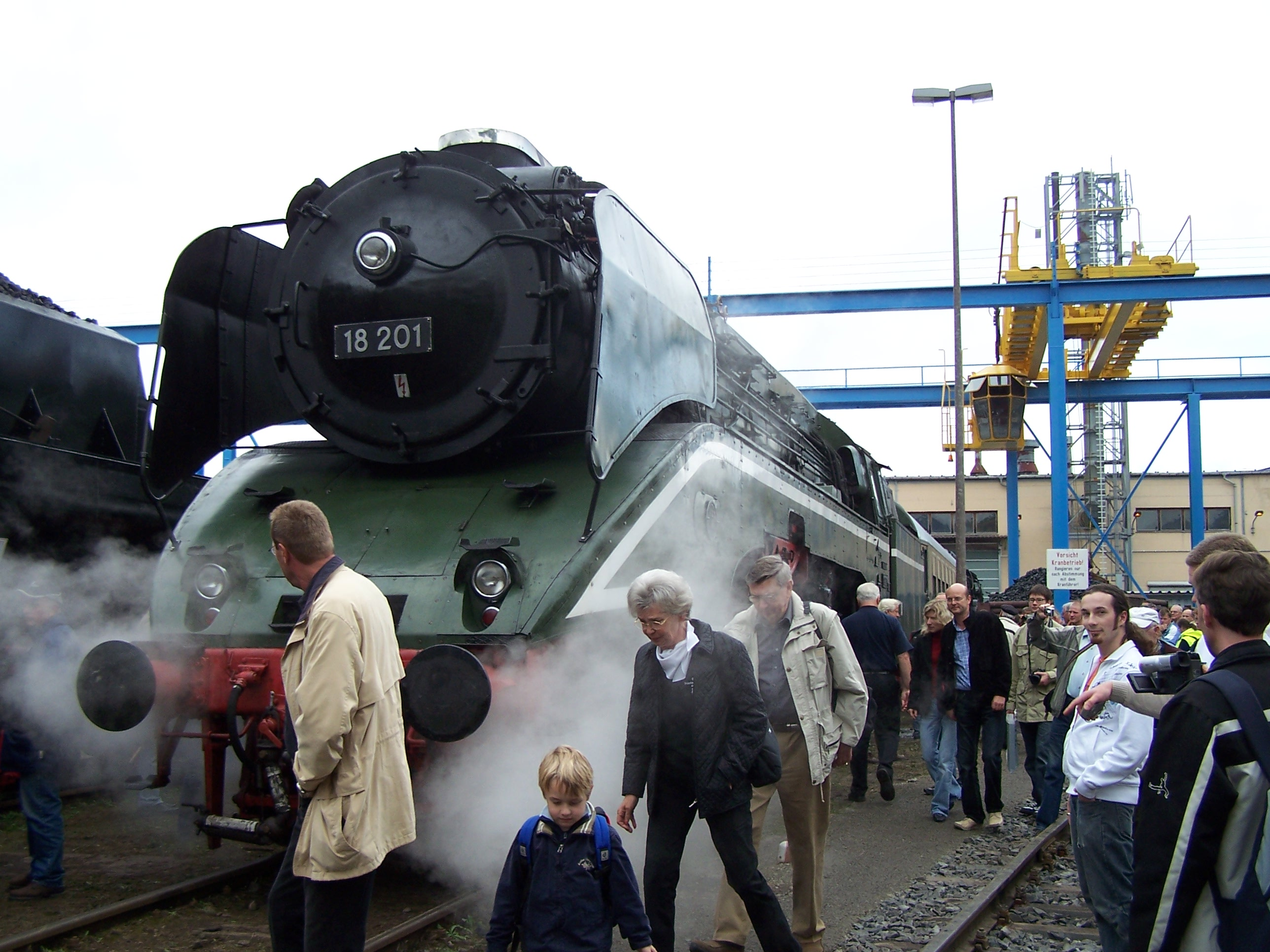
Locomotive 18 201 at the 2007 Steam Festival

Since 1995 the Meiningen Steam Festival (Meininger Dampfloktage) takes place annually on the first weekend in September. The two-day event is visited by up to 15,000 steam locomotive enthusiasts from Germany and elsewhere. Some travel there in special trains hauled by steam locomotives.
In 2007, an almost fully refurbished ADLER, which had been seriously damaged in the 2005 fire in Nuremberg, was on display.

There are regular guided tours of the factory, every first and third Saturday in the month at 10.00 o'clock. A tour lasts about 1½ hours and booking is not necessary.

== See also ==
- History of rail transport in Germany
- List of DRG locomotives and railbuses

== Literature ==
- Meininger Heimatklänge 4/2005
- Meininger Dampf Zeit 1914- 2004 90 Jahre Dampflokwerk
- Das Dampflokwerk Meiningen - Eisenbahn-Kurier-Special 50, Freiburg 1998
