= Nuremberg Transport Museum =

Nuremberg Transport Museum Verkehrsmuseum Nürnberg
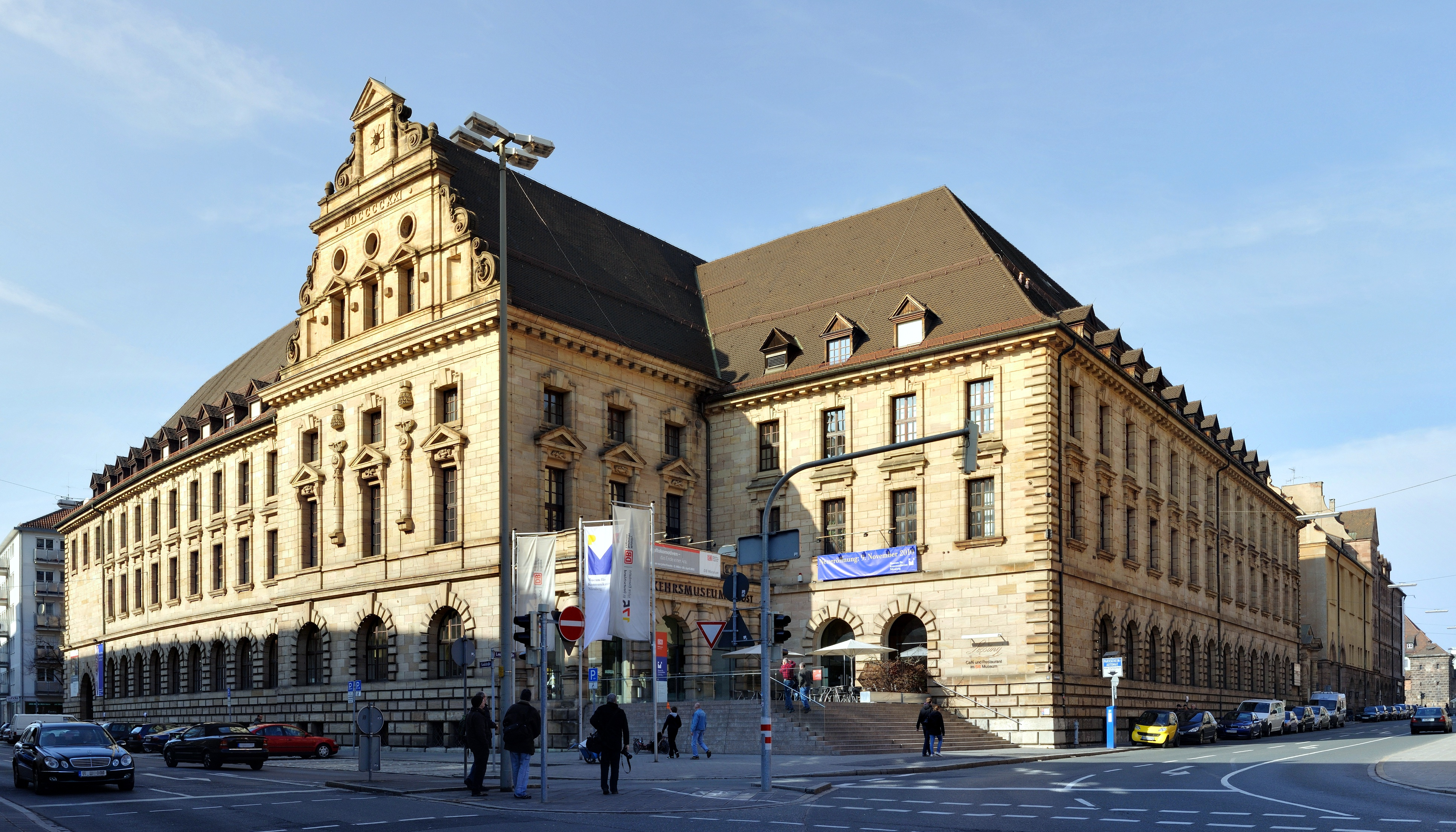
- Entrance of the museum.

- Location of the museum in Bavaria. Nuremberg Transport Museum (Germany)
- Established: 1899
- Location: Nuremberg, Germany
- Coordinates: 49°26′44″N 11°04′28″E
- Type: Transport history museum
- Website: dbmuseum.de/en/nuremberg

The Nuremberg Transport Museum (Verkehrsmuseum Nürnberg) in Nuremberg, Germany, consists of Deutsche Bahn's DB Museum and the Museum of Communications (Museum für Kommunikation). It also has two satellite museums at Koblenz-Lützel (DB Museum Koblenz) and Halle (DB Museum Halle). The Nuremberg Transport Museum is one of the oldest technical history museums in Europe and is a milestone on the European Route of Industrial Heritage (ERIH).

== The DB Museum ==
=== History ===
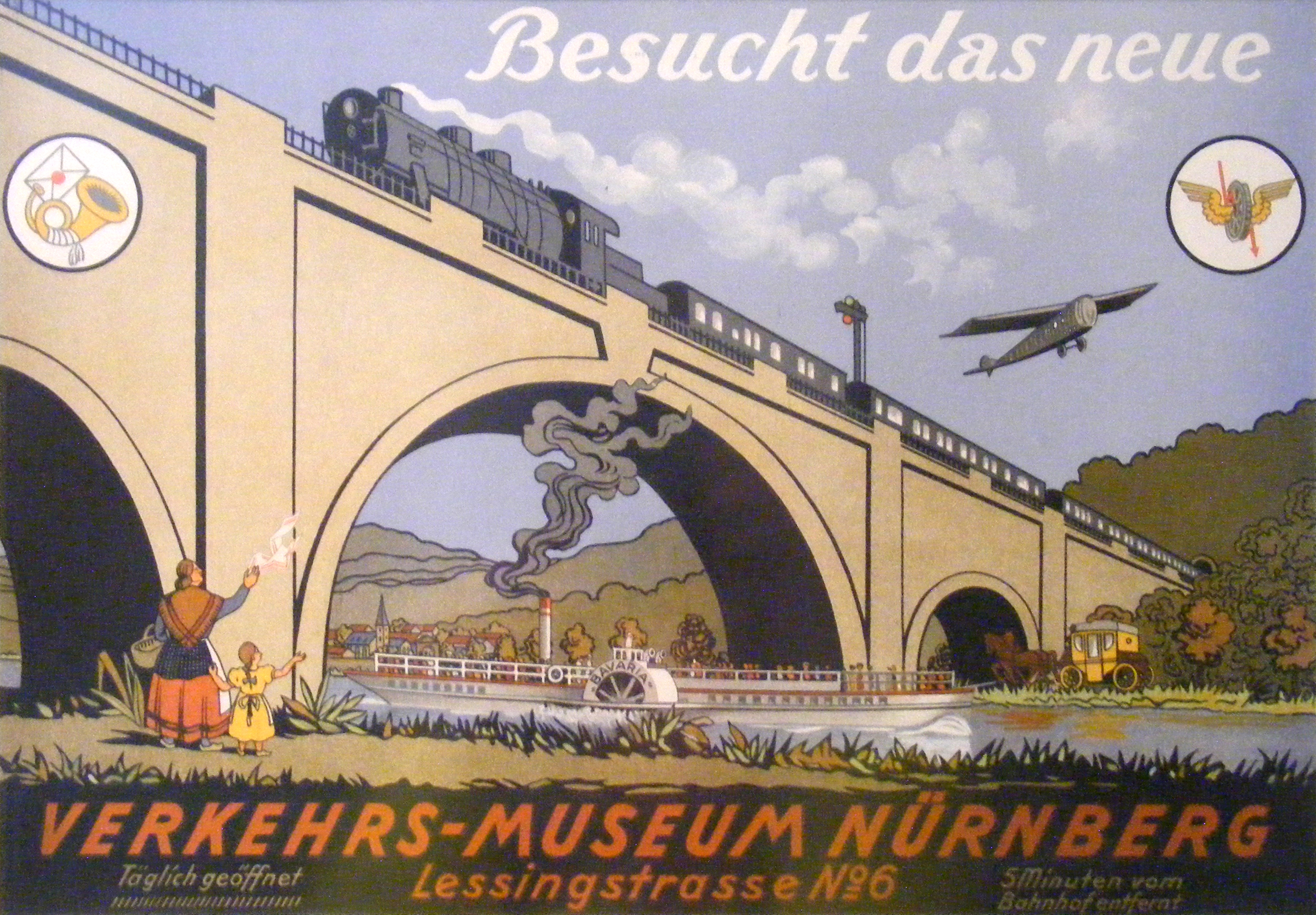
A 1920s advertisement which says "Visit the new Transport Museum in Nuremberg".

The forerunner of the present-day DB Museum was opened in 1899 as a royal Bavarian railway museum and it is therefore the oldest railway museum in Germany. Today it is a company museum belonging to the Deutsche Bahn and portrays, amongst other things, the history of the railways. The present building was built in 1925.

On 1 July 1996, the Deutsche Bahn AG (DB AG) took over the museum from the Deutsche Bundesbahn for the symbolic purchase price of one deutschmark. At the same time Dr. Jürgen Franzke, previously head of the Museum of Industrial Culture (Museums Industriekultur) in Nuremberg, was appointed as the museum's chief. The DB AG planned at that time to invest 6 million DM up to the museum's centenary year.

=== Exhibits ===
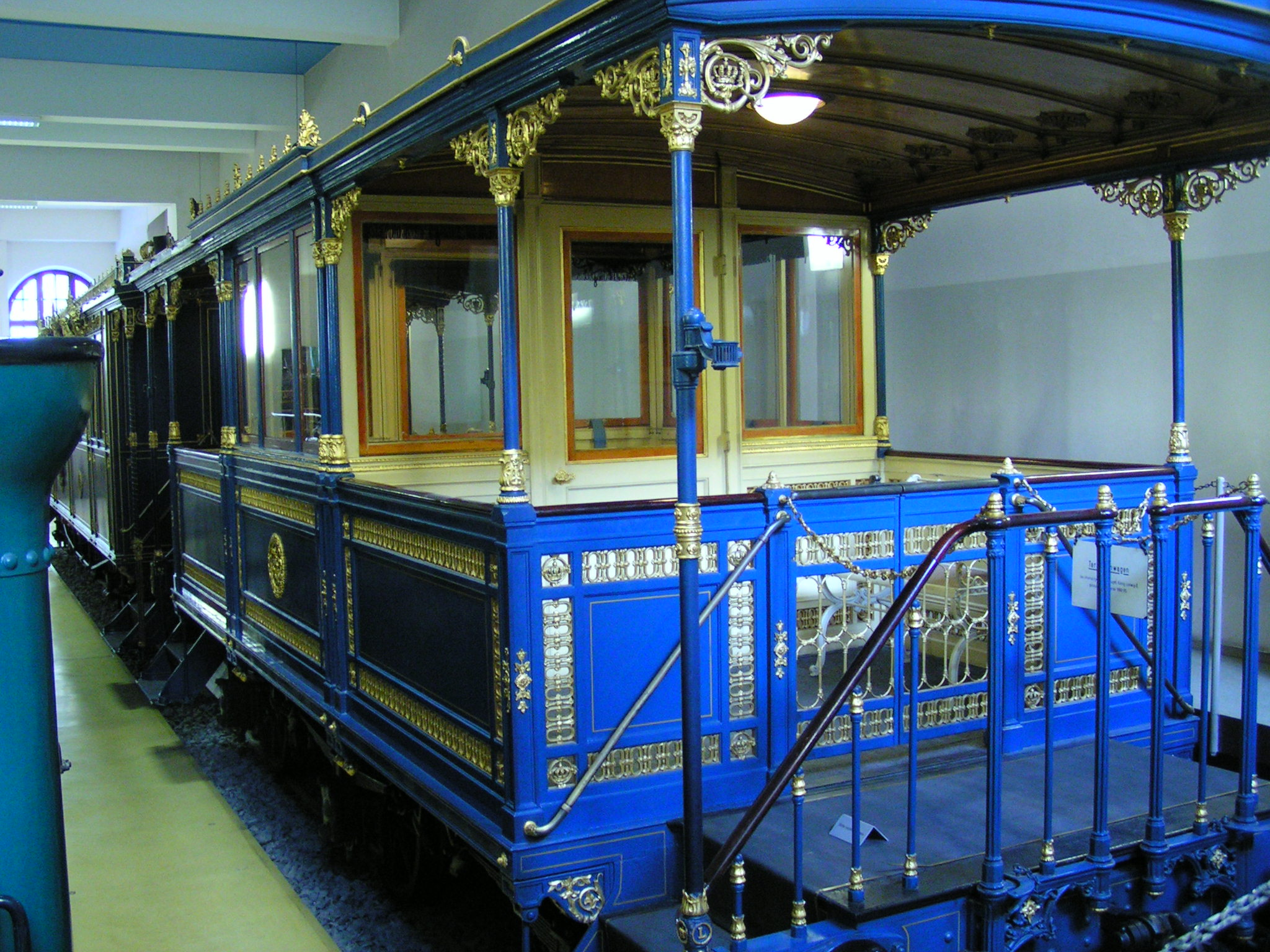
King Ludwig's royal train.

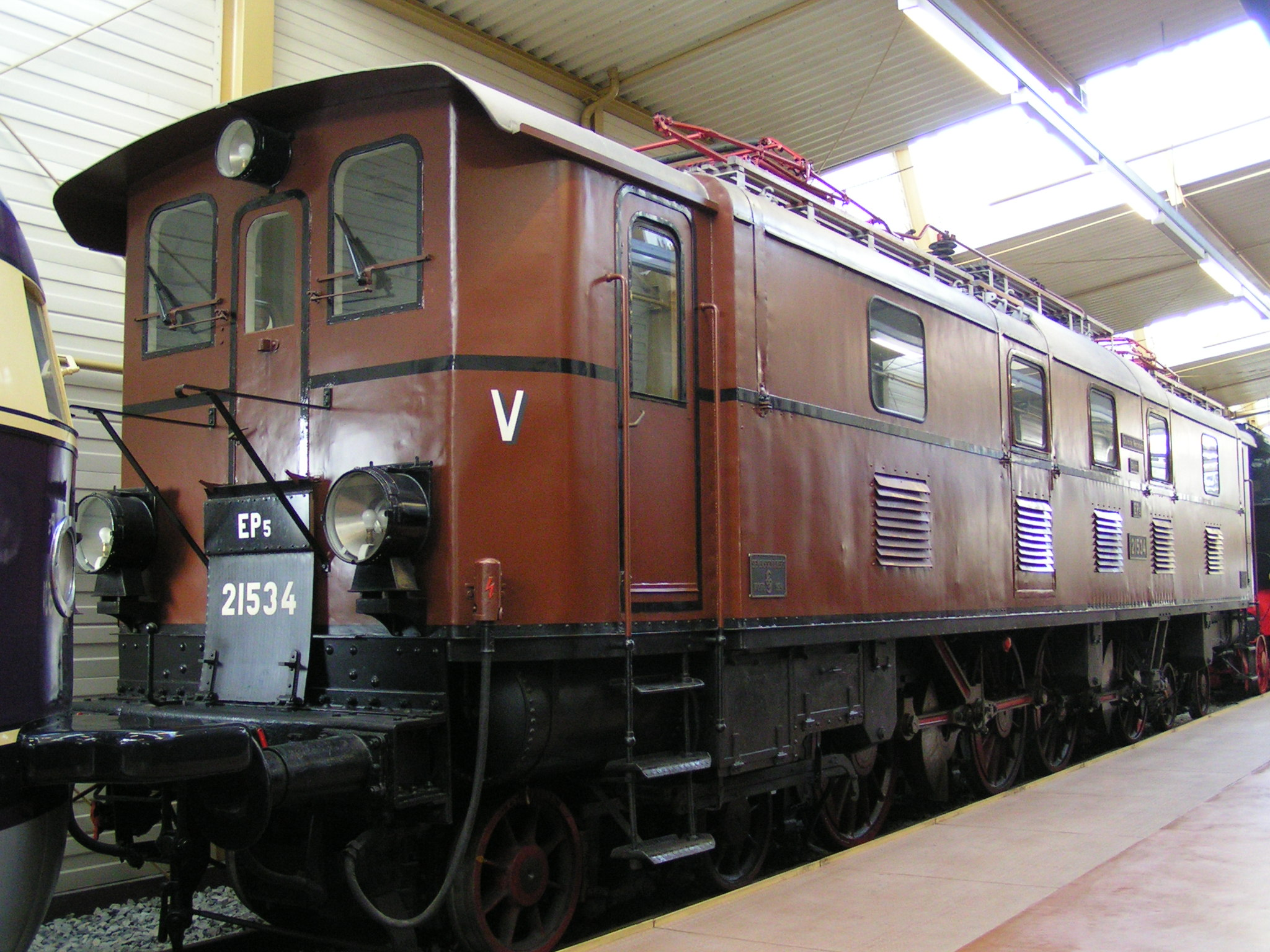
TA Class EP 5 (later E 52 and 152) electric locomotive.

In the displays of historical railway vehicles are the following important exhibits:

- Parts of the royal train for the Bavarian king, Ludwig II
- The streamlined locomotive, 05 001
- A TEE diesel railcar from the 1950s
- An original coal wagon from 1829 (on long-term loan from the National Railway Museum, York from the South Hetton coal mine in England, the oldest surviving railway vehicle on the European mainland
- The oldest steam locomotive in Germany still preserved in its original state, the Nordgau (built in 1853)
- The Bavarian S 2/6 express train locomotive
- The red E 19 12 express train locomotive
- A fragment of the SVT 877 Flying Hamburger diesel multiple unit.
- A mock-up of part of the traction coach of the ICE 3

Some of the original vehicles are not in the museum itself, but in the wagon shed situated in the open area belonging to the museum on the opposite side of the street. The museum also owns a range of historical vehicles that can be used for special rail services.

=== Model collection ===
A further attraction of the museum is its collection of 160, 1:10 scale models occupying 1000 square metres of the museum. These models have been built over the years since the end of the 19th century and are very finely detailed. The first were made in 1882 by apprentices of the Royal Bavarian State Railways (Königlich Bayerische Staats-Eisenbahnen).

The museum also offers a walk-through tunnel, a level crossing, signals and points that can be operated, models equipped with sound and light and simulators.

=== Model railway ===
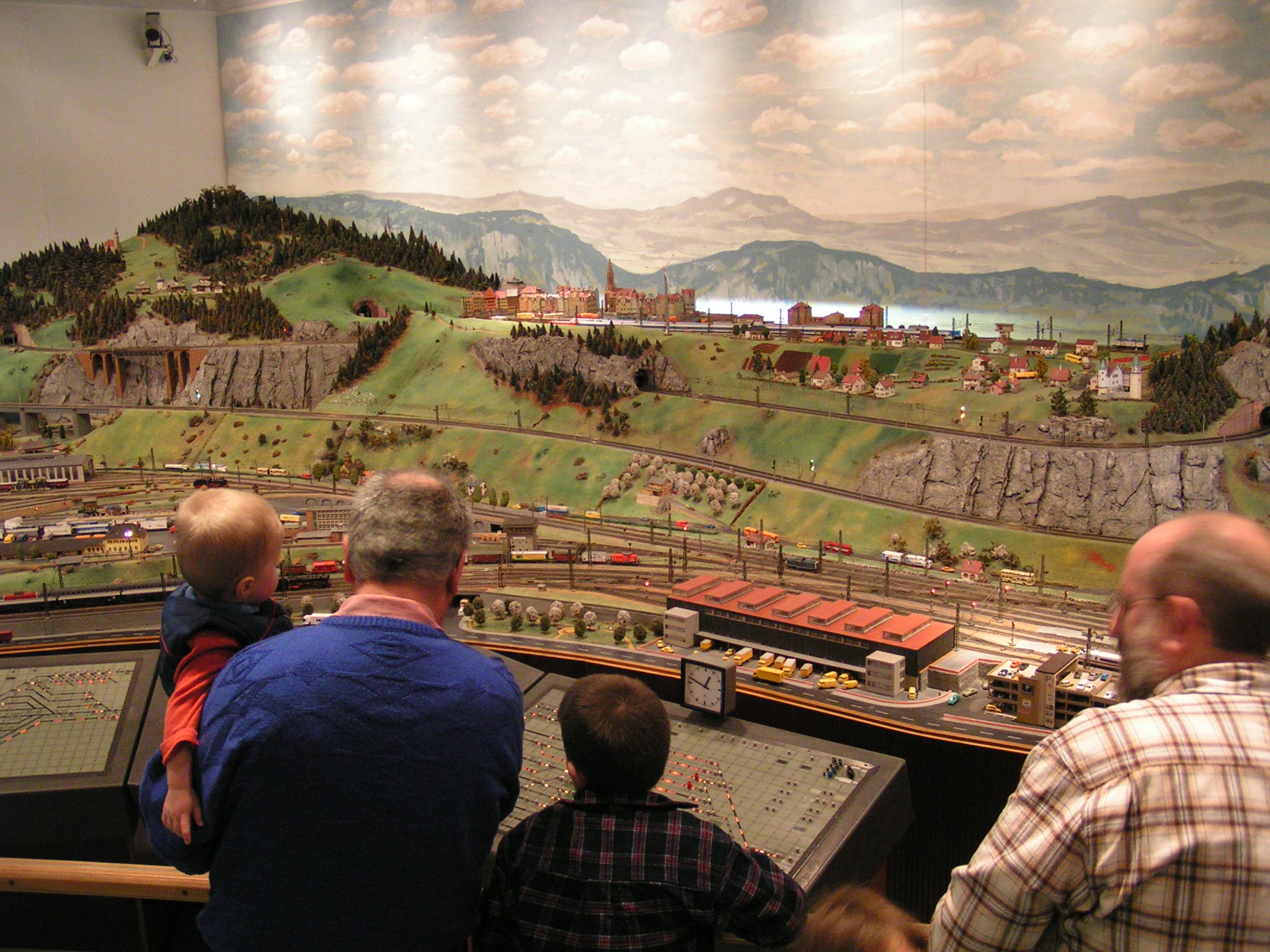
Model railway in the Nuremberg Transport Museum

A model railway covering an area of 80 m^{2} is used to demonstrate prototypical railway operations. During museum opening hours there is a ten-minute demonstration hourly, on the half-hour, with explanations of the key concepts of railway operating. The layout, built between 1960 and 1970, is worked using control panels with a total of some 5000 relays.

=== Library ===
In the main building of the DB Museum there is a library with about 40,000 titles on railway subjects. The Präsenzbibliothek can be visited by appointment free of charge on workdays. Postal loans are not possible.

=== Damage following the fire of 17 October 2005 ===
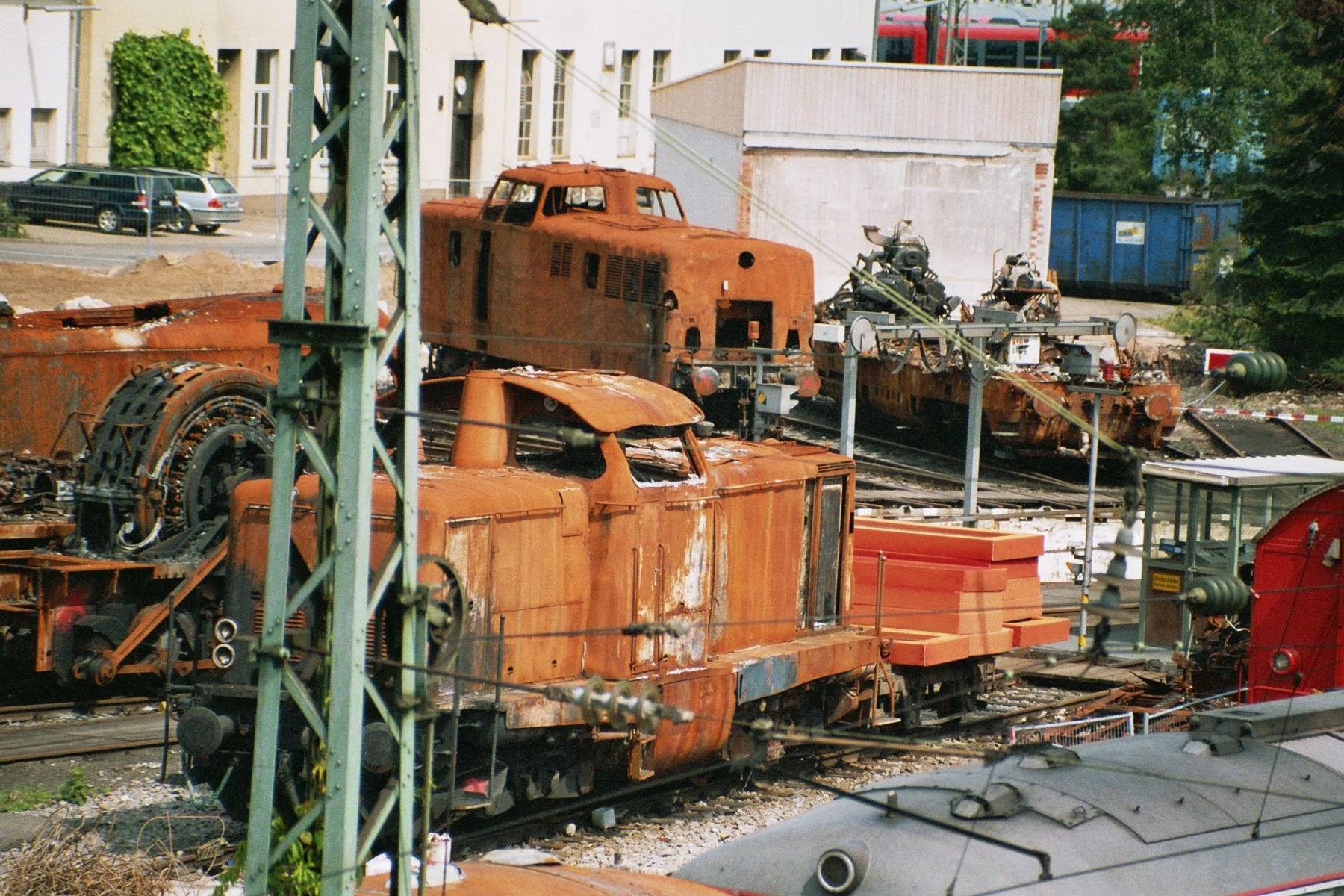
Remains of the burnt-out engines in the locomotive shed Gostenhof. In front the former V 100 1023 Hof engine.

On the evening of 17 October 2005 much of the roundhouse of the museum, less its steel frame, was burnt to the ground. Unlike the wagon shed, the locomotive shed was not located in the immediate vicinity of the museum and accessible to the public, but four kilometres away at the Nuremberg West locomotive depot in the suburb of Gostenhof. It was there that the DB Museum had stabled operational locomotives for which room could not be found in the museum.

A 1935 working replica of the Adler, a locomotive from the first German railway between Nuremberg and Fürth, was badly damaged by the blaze. Apprentices and experienced specialists rebuilt the engine in the Meiningen Steam Locomotive Works. After two years of reconstruction the Adler was once again ready for operations in October 2007 and returned to the Nuremberg Transport Museum on 23 November 2007. Federal Government MPs, members of the DB AG management and the Bavarian minister-president, Beckstein, took part in the first journey of the restored Adler on 26 April 2008. A further, non-operational, 1953 replica is displayed in the museum.

Unfortunately the last surviving examples of the goods train locomotive, the DRG Class 45, the electric Class E 75 locomotive and other exhibits, especially locomotives, as well as numerous spare parts, also fell victim to the fire or were at least badly damaged.

A total of 24 historical engines and wagons went up in smoke. In the long term, the steam engines should be repairable, as should the E 75. The damaged diesel engines and railbuses, due to their light construction, were irreparable and were scrapped by July 2006. The burnt out and partly collapsed locomotive shed was torn down. Several locos were sold or loaned to railway museums for restoration. For example, number 23 105, the last steam engine bought by the Bundesbahn in 1959, was leased to the South German Railway Museum (Süddeutsches Eisenbahnmuseum Heilbronn) in Heilbronn for visual restoration.

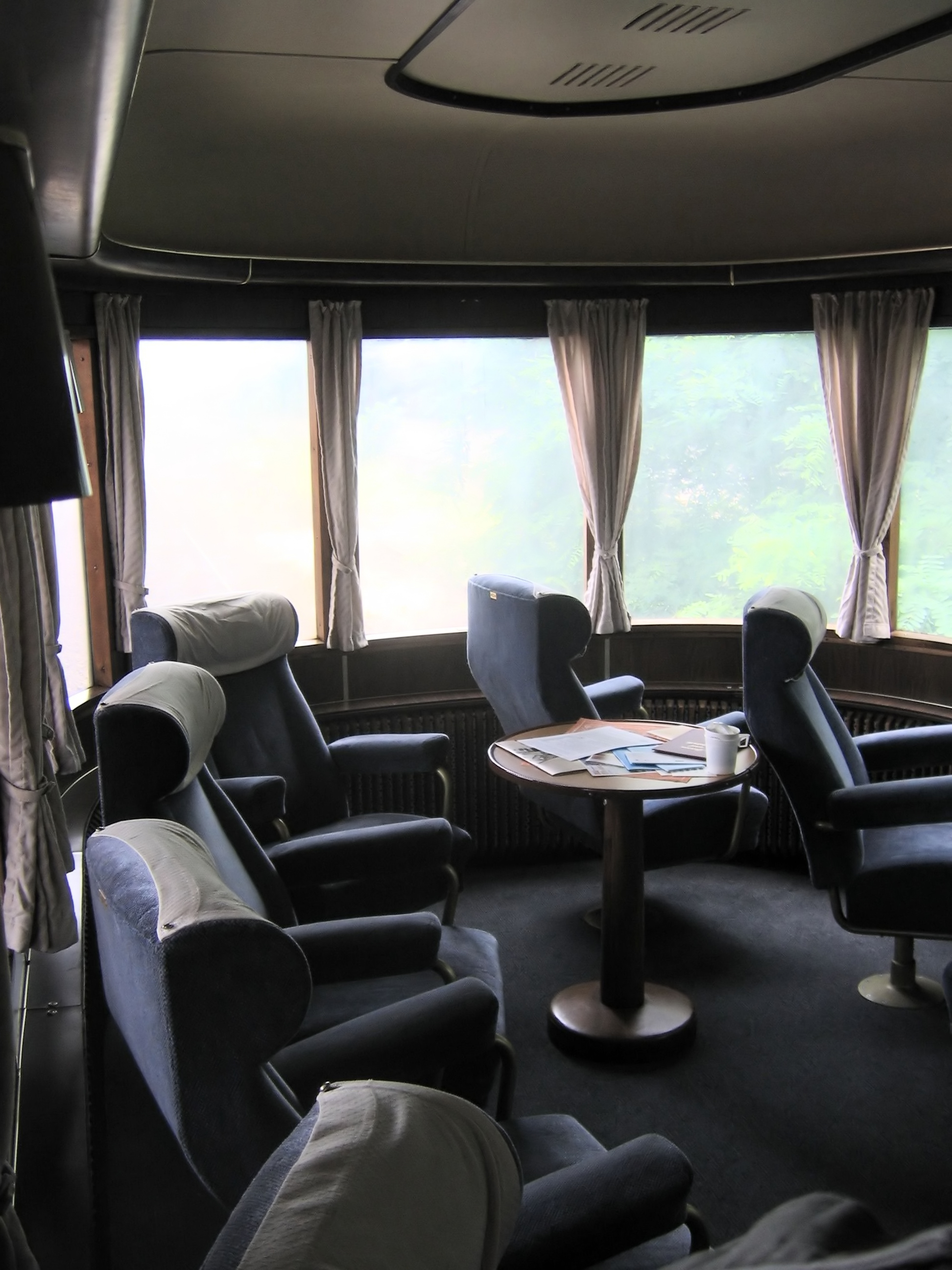
Observation coach of the Henschel-Wegmann Train.

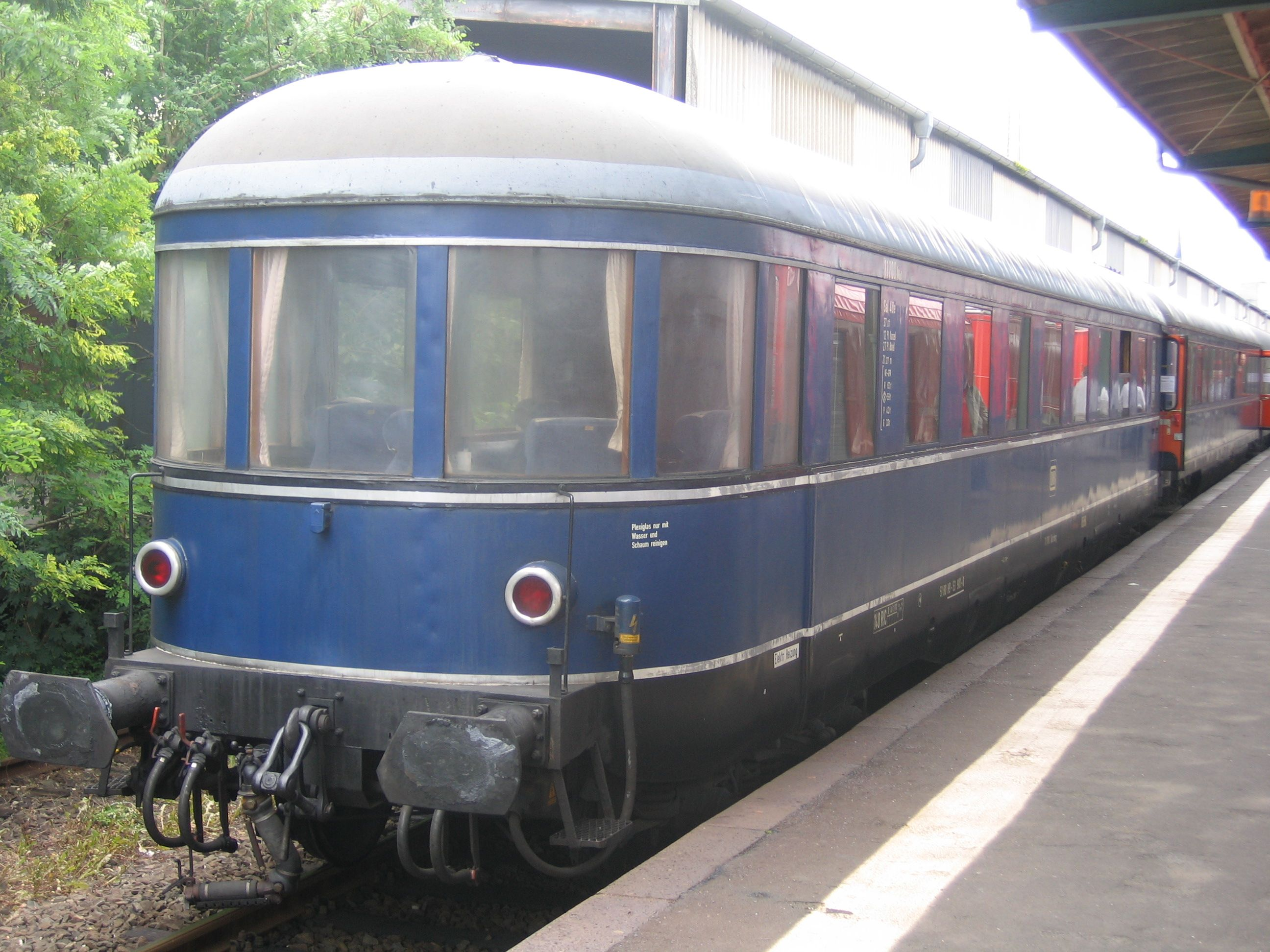
Outside view of the observation coach of the Henschel-Wegmann train in service with the 'Blue Gentian' (Blaue Enzian) express.

== DB Museum branch in Koblenz ==
In the Lützel district of Koblenz is the DB Museum, Koblenz, a branch of the museum that accommodates a number of vehicles including several Class 103, 110 and 113, E 44 and E 16 electric express locomotives, as well as several coaches belonging to the Joseph Goebbels special train. In addition a restored Prussian T 3, factory number 499 built by the Maschinenfabrik Christian Hagans in 1903 and stored under in accordance with strict heritage protection regulations, can be viewed. For decades it had been used as in a children's play park at Cologne Zoo. At present two of the steam locomotive exhibits damaged in the great fire at Nuremberg are also being restored there.

== DB Museum branch in Halle (Saale) ==
The former locomotive shed in Halle (Saale) is a branch of the Nuremberg Museum. On display there are several Deutsche Reichsbahn vehicles, in particular the 03 1010 steam locomotive and the E 11 001 and E 18 31 electric locomotives. The vehicles are looked after by the Halle shed.

== Museum of Communications ==
The museum of communications in the Transport Museum came from the royal Bavarian postal museum and was integrated into the Transport Museum in 1902. It displays over 500 years of postal and telecommunication services history in Bavaria from the Middle Ages to the present. Major aspects covered are the development of postal transportation, post coach travel, telegraphy and telephony. Original vehicles, such as post coaches and motorised vehicles, are displayed, as well as technical equipment from old-fashioned teleprinters to modern news satellites.

Due to lack of space, several historical railway postal vehicles are located in the railway park at Augsburg.

== Charter and tourist trains ==
The Nuremberg Transport Museum owns several trains, not all stabled in Nuremberg, that are used for tourist and charter services including:

- The Rheingold Express with DB Class E 03 locomotives. Based in Cologne.
- The traditional Zwickau fast-stopping train (Traditions-Eilzug Zwickau), based in Berlin.
- The Blue Gentian (Blauer Enzian) TEE express. Stabled in Berlin.
- The Deutsche Bundesbahn express, based in Düsseldorf.
- The Adler old-time replica locomotive with three open passenger wagons, stabled at Nuremberg.

== Film ==
- Episode 347 of Eisenbahn-Romantik named 100 Jahre Verkehrsmuseum Nürnberg shows the museum.

== See also ==
- List of railway museums
- Deutsche Reichsbahn
- History of rail transport in Germany
- List of Bavarian locomotives and railbuses
- Royal Bavarian State Railways
- B&O Railroad Museum (US)
- Exporail (Canada)
- Locomotion: the National Railway Museum at Shildon (UK)
- Workshops Rail Museum (Australia)

== Literature ==
- Werner Willhaus: 100 Jahre Verkehrsmuseum Nürnberg. Eine Legende feiert Geburtstag. In: Eisenbahn-Kurier. Nr. 322/Jahrgang 33/1999. EK-Verlag GmbH, ISSN 0170-5288, S. 54–58.
