= DRG Class 45 =

Class of 28 German 2-10-2 locomotives (1936-1968)

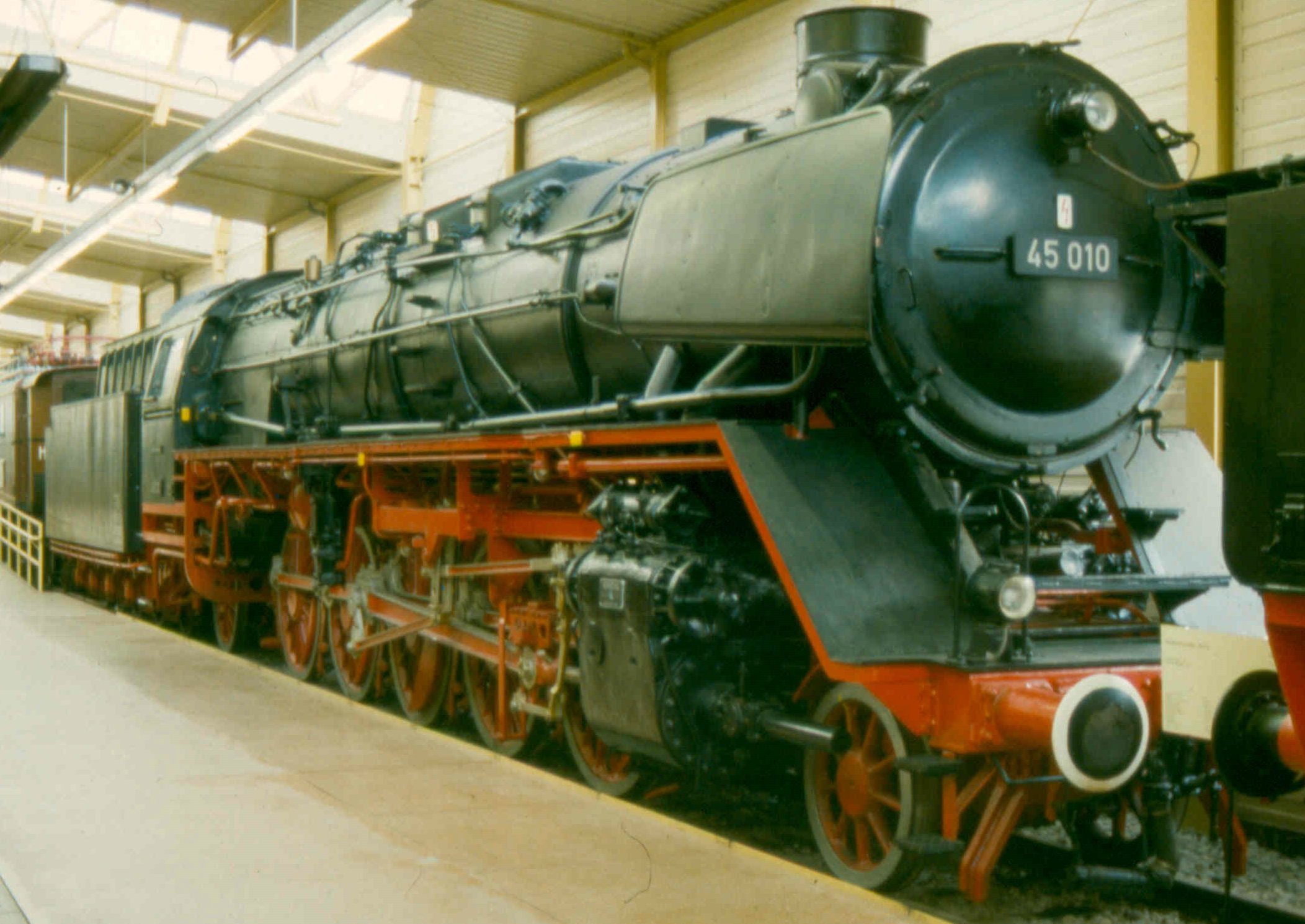
- 45 010 in the DB Museum, Nuremberg
Type and origin
- Power type: Steam
- Order number: Henschel & Sohn
- Serial number: 22805–22806, 24796–24821
- Build date: 1937–1940
- Total produced: 28
Specifications
- Configuration
  - Whyte: 2-10-2
  - UIC: 1′E1′ h3
  - German: G 57.18 (also G 57.20)
- Driver: Divided: inner cylinder on 2nd coupled axle, outer on 3rd
- Gauge: 1,435 mm (4 ft 8 1/2 in)
- Leading dia.: 1,000 mm (3 ft 3 3/8 in)
- Driver dia.: 1,600 mm (5 ft 3 in)
- Trailing dia.: 1,250 mm (4 ft 1 1/4 in)
- Wheelbase
  - Axle spacing (Asymmetrical): 3,000 mm (9 ft 10 1/8 in) +; 1,850 mm (6 ft 7/8 in) +; 1,850 mm (6 ft 7/8 in) +; 1,850 mm (6 ft 7/8 in) +; 1,850 mm (6 ft 7/8 in) +; 3,200 mm (10 ft 6 in) =
  - Engine: 13,600 mm (44 ft 7 3/8 in)
  - Tender: 1,750 mm (5 ft 8 7/8 in) +; 1,500 mm (4 ft 11 in) +; 1,375 mm (4 ft 6 1/8 in) +; 1,375 mm (4 ft 6 1/8 in) =; 6,000 mm (19 ft 8 1/4 in)
  - incl. tender: 21,775 mm (71 ft 5 1/4 in)
- Length
  - Over headstocks: 24,345 mm (79 ft 10 1/2 in)
  - Over buffers: 25,645 mm (84 ft 1 5/8 in)
- Axle load: 001–002: 18.6 or 19.9 t (18.3 or 19.6 long tons; 20.5 or 21.9 short tons); Remainder: 18.2 or 19.8 t (17.9 or 19.5 long tons; 20.1 or 21.8 short tons); Rebuilt: 18.2–18.6 or 19.4–19.9 t (17.9–18.3 or 19.1–19.6 long tons; 20.1–20.5 or 21.4–21.9 short tons)
- Adhesive weight: 001–002: 92.9 or 99.4 t (91.4 or 97.8 long tons; 102.4 or 109.6 short tons); Remainder: 90.7 or 98.8 t (89.3 or 97.2 long tons; 100.0 or 108.9 short tons); Rebuilt: 91.0–93.0 or 97.2–99.7 t (89.6–91.5 or 95.7–98.1 long tons; 100.3–102.5 or 107.1–109.9 short tons)
- Empty weight: 001–002: 117.5 t (115.6 long tons; 129.5 short tons); Remainder: 114.7 t (112.9 long tons; 126.4 short tons); Rebuilt: 112.3–114.4 t (110.5–112.6 long tons; 123.8–126.1 short tons)
- Service weight: 001–002: 128.4 t (126.4 long tons; 141.5 short tons); Remainder: 126.7 t (124.7 long tons; 139.7 short tons); Rebuilt: 125.5–128.5 t (123.5–126.5 long tons; 138.3–141.6 short tons)
- Tender type: New: 2′3 T 38; Rebuilt: 2′3 T 29
- Fuel type: Coal
- Fuel capacity: 2′3 T 38: 10 t (9.8 long tons; 11 short tons); 2′3 T 29: 12 t (12 long tons; 13 short tons)
- Water cap.: 2′3 T 38: 38 m^{3} (8,360 imp gal; 10,000 US gal); 2′3 T 29: 29 m^{3} (6,380 imp gal; 7,660 US gal)
- Firebox
  - Grate area: 001–002: 5.0 m^{2} (54 sq ft); Remainder: 4.8 m^{2} (52 sq ft); Rebuilt: 4.5 m^{2} (48 sq ft)
- Boiler
  - Pitch: 3,060 mm (10 ft 1/2 in)
  - Tube plates: New: 7,500 mm (24 ft 7 1/4 in); Rebuilt: 6,500 mm (21 ft 3 7/8 in)
  - Small tubes: 001–002: 83 mm (3 1/4 in), 72 off; Remainder: 79 mm (3 1/8 in), 98 off; Rebuilt: 60 mm (2 3/8 in), 106 off
  - Large tubes: 001–002: 191 mm (7 1/2 in), 33 off; Remainder: 185 mm (7 5/16 in), 30 off; Rebuilt: 152 mm (6 in), 44 off
- Boiler pressure: new: 20 bar (20.4 kgf/cm^{2}; 290 psi); later: 16 bar (16.3 kgf/cm^{2}; 232 psi)
- Heating surface
  - Firebox: 001–002: 18.8 m^{2} (202 sq ft); Remainder: 18.7 m^{2} (201 sq ft); Rebuilt: 23.2 m^{2} (250 sq ft)
  - Tubes: 001–002: 130.0 m^{2} (1,399 sq ft); Remainder: 168.5 m^{2} (1,814 sq ft); Rebuilt: 116.9 m^{2} (1,258 sq ft)
  - Flues: 001–002: 140.2 m^{2} (1,509 sq ft); Remainder: 123.3 m^{2} (1,327 sq ft); Rebuilt: 128.9 m^{2} (1,387 sq ft)
  - Total surface: 001–002: 289.0 m^{2} (3,111 sq ft); Remainder: 310.5 m^{2} (3,342 sq ft); Rebuilt: 269.0 m^{2} (2,895 sq ft)
- Superheater
  - Heating area: 001–002: 132.5 m^{2} (1,426 sq ft); Remainder: 120.6 m^{2} (1,298 sq ft); Rebuilt: 120.6 m^{2} (1,298 sq ft)
- Cylinders: Three
- Cylinder size: 520 mm × 720 mm (20 1/2 in × 28 3/8 in)
- Valve gear: Heusinger valve gear
- Valve type: Piston valves
- Train heating: Steam
- Loco brake: Single knorr air brake
- Train brakes: Knorr brake
- Couplers: Screw Link
Performance figures
- Maximum speed: 90 km/h (56 mph)
- Indicated power: 2,800 PS (2,060 kW; 2,760 hp); 3,020 PS (2,220 kW; 2,980 hp) (45 003)
Career
- Numbers: 45 001 – 45 028
- Retired: 1946–1968

German Class 45 steam locomotives were standard locomotives (Einheitslokomotiven) designed by the Deutsche Reichsbahn for hauling goods trains.

== History ==
The Class 45 engines were the most powerful steam locomotives ever operated in Germany. They were built between 1936 and 1937 by the firm of Henschel. After the first two engines entered service, a further 26 units were delivered in 1940. However, the third order for another 103 machines was cancelled in 1941, because the outbreak of the Second World War favoured the construction of simpler wartime locomotives, the so-called Kriegslokomotiven. The Class 45s were given the operating numbers 45 001 to 45 028.

After the war, boiler damage appeared very quickly that made a reduction of the boiler overpressure to 16 bar necessary. From 1950 therefore several Deutsche Bundesbahn machines were equipped with an outer firebox with a combustion chamber and a mechanical underfeed stoker (Rostbeschicker). The engines with operating numbers 45 010, 45 016, 45 019, 45 021 and 45 023 were provided with welded boilers and underfeed stoker equipment.

In East Germany, the Deutsche Reichsbahn's sole example, 45 024, was rebuilt into high pressure variant and renumbered H 45 024. It proved to be a failure and was retired in 1959. Parts of this locomotive (outside cylinders, trailing wheels and the rear section of the locomotive frame) were used in building engine no. 18 201.

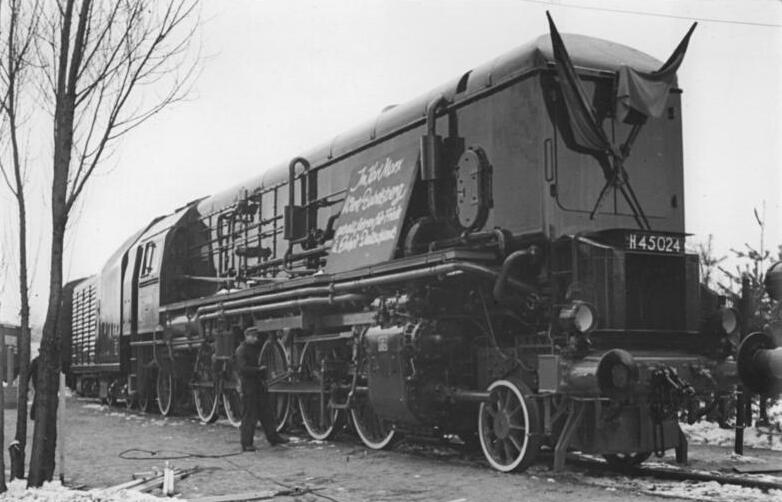
H 45 024 in Leipzig, 1951

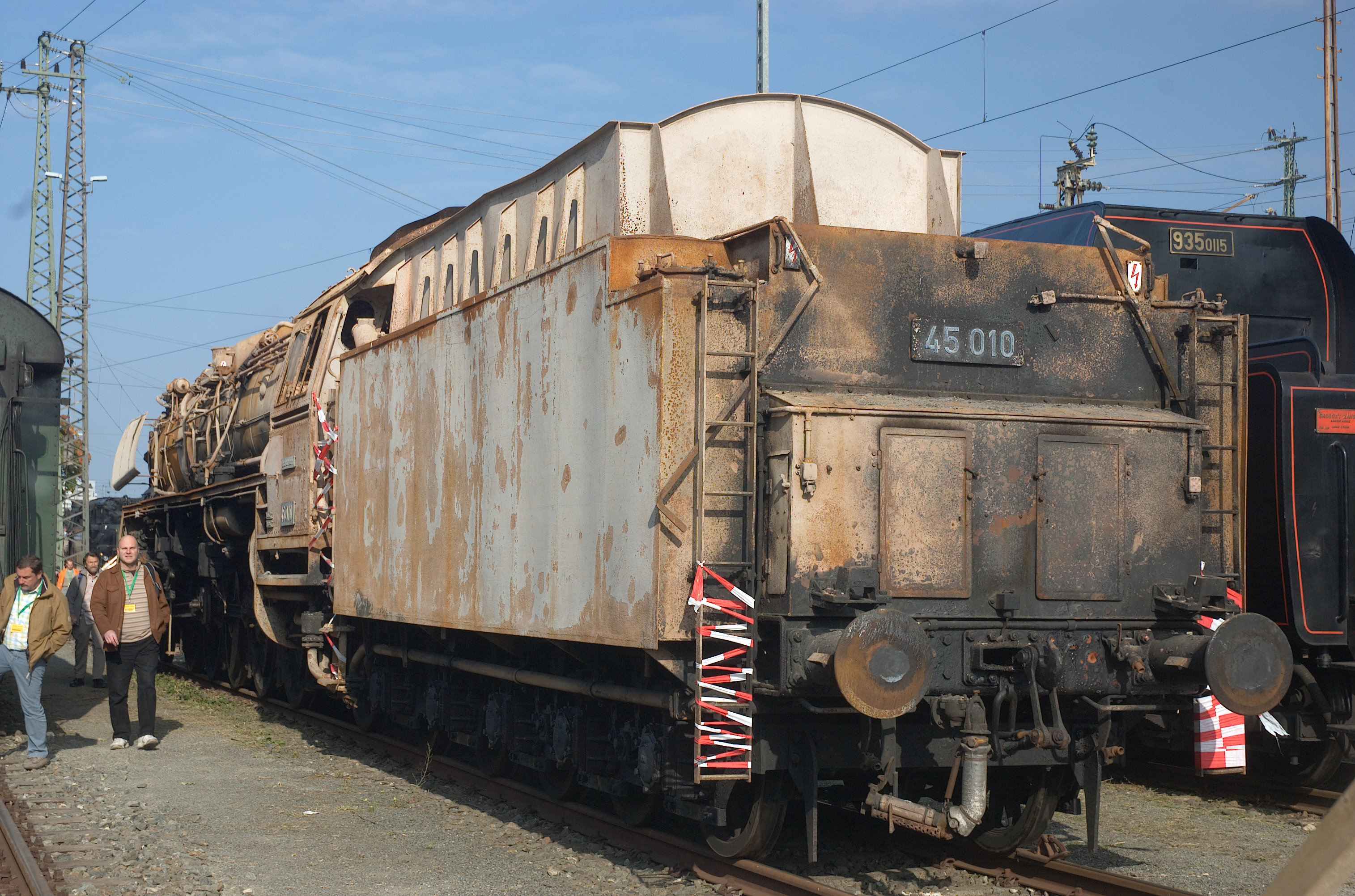
Condition of 45 010 after the great fire

In 1968 the Deutsche Bundesbahn only had three examples left, which were used as braking and experimental engines by the Bundesbahn Central Office in Munich and Minden. They were no. 45 023, which was stabled in Munich, and nos. 45 010 and 45 019, which were stationed at Minden. On the evening of 17 October 2005 a fire destroyed the locomotive shed of the Nuremberg Transport Museum in Nuremberg, as a result of which the last preserved example of this class, the 45 010, was badly damaged. Plans were put in hand to restore it and this was completed during 2012.

This class was initially a faulty design, similar to the DRB Class 06, because of its poor boiler. Following replacement of the boiler and the introduction of mechanical stoking the true qualities of this locomotive became clear. As well as being used as braking locomotives for the Bundesbahn Central Office, in their final years numbers 45 019 and 45 010 were used time and again for those heavy goods train duties that the Class 44 locomotives had difficulties with.

The vehicles were coupled with 2′3 T 38 tenders. Those with underfeed stokers had 2′3 T 29 Stoker tenders.

Table of DB locomotive withdrawals
Year	Quantity in service at start of year	Quantity withdrawn	Locomotive numbers	Notes
1946	27	1	45 002	
1953	26	12	45 001, 005–007, 013, 015, 017, 018, 025–028	
1955	14	2	45 004, 011	
1957	12	6	45 003, 008, 009, 014, 021, 022	021 reboilered
1958	6	1	45 012	later reinstated
1959	5 or 6	1	45 020	
1961	5	1	45 012	
1964	4	1	45 016	reboilered
1968	3	2	045 019-7, 023-9	reboilered
1969	1	1	045 010-6	reboilered; preserved

== See also ==
- List of DRG locomotives and railbuses
