= 81 class =

81 class or Class 81 may refer to:

- British Rail Class 81
- DRG Class 81
- KTM Class 81
- New South Wales 81 class locomotive
