= DRG Class 85 =

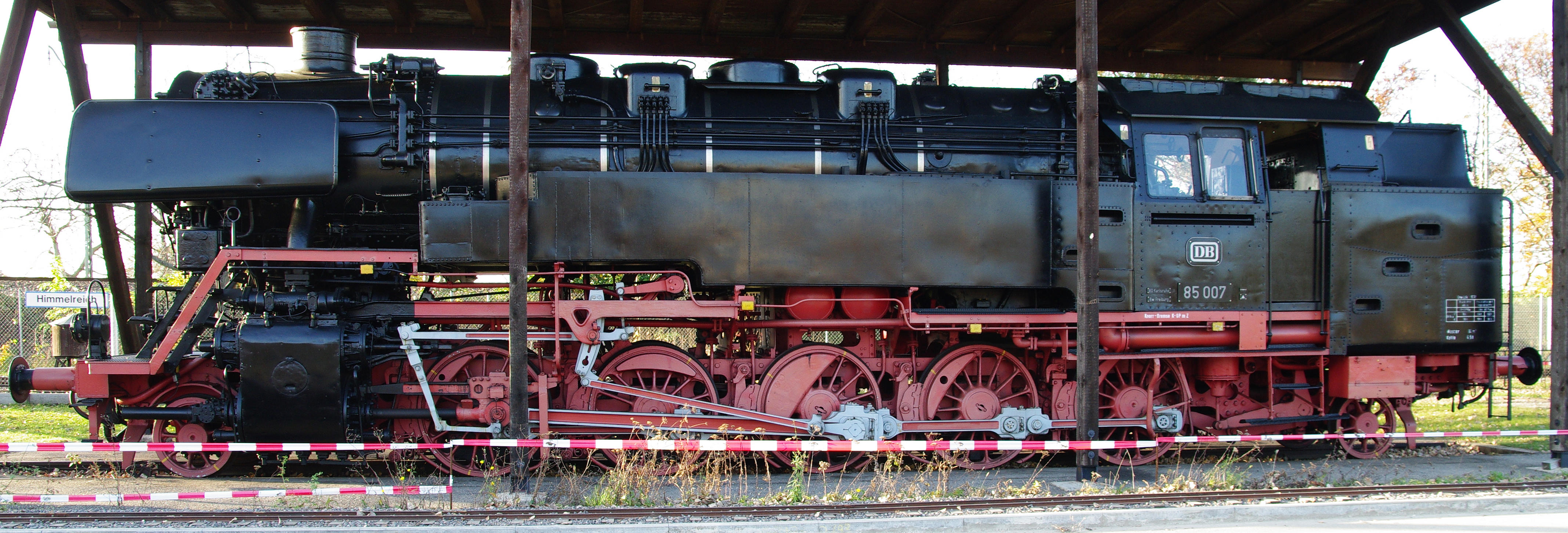
- 85 007 in November 2009
Type and origin
- Power type: Steam
- Builder: Henschel & Sohn
- Serial number: 22110–22117, 22142–22144
- Build date: 1932–1933
- Total produced: 10
Specifications
- Configuration
  - Whyte: 2-10-2T
  - UIC: 1′E1′ h3t
  - German: Gt 57.20
- Driver: Divided: Inner cylinder to 2nd coupled axle, outer to 3rd
- Gauge: 1,435 mm (4 ft 8 1/2 in)
- Leading dia.: 850 mm (2 ft 9 1/2 in)
- Driver dia.: 1,400 mm (4 ft 7 1/8 in)
- Trailing dia.: 850 mm (2 ft 9 1/2 in)
- Wheelbase
  - Axle spacing (Asymmetrical): 2,850 mm (9 ft 4 1/4 in) +; 1,700 mm (5 ft 6 7/8 in) +; 1,700 mm (5 ft 6 7/8 in) +; 1,700 mm (5 ft 6 7/8 in) +; 1,700 mm (5 ft 6 7/8 in) +; 2,850 mm (9 ft 4 1/4 in) =
  - Engine: 12,500 mm (41 ft 1/8 in)
- Length
  - Over headstocks: 15,000 mm (49 ft 2 1/2 in)
  - Over buffers: 16,300 mm (53 ft 5 3/4 in)
- Width: 3,050 mm (10 ft 1/16 in)
- Height: 4,550 mm (14 ft 11 1/8 in)
- Axle load: 19.94 tonnes (19.63 long tons; 21.98 short tons)
- Adhesive weight: 99.7 tonnes (98.1 long tons; 109.9 short tons)
- Empty weight: 107.5 tonnes (105.8 long tons; 118.5 short tons)
- Service weight: 133.6 tonnes (131.5 long tons; 147.3 short tons)
- Fuel type: Coal
- Fuel capacity: 4.5 tonnes (4.4 long tons; 5.0 short tons)
- Water cap.: 14 m^{3} (3,080 imp gal; 3,700 US gal)
- Firebox
  - Grate area: 3.5 m^{2} (38 sq ft)
- Boiler
  - Pitch: 3,150 mm (10 ft 4 in)
  - Tube plates: 4,700 mm (15 ft 5 in)
  - Small tubes: 50 mm (1 15/16 in), 155 off
  - Large tubes: 133 mm (5 1/4 in), 41 off
- Boiler pressure: 14 bar (14.3 kgf/cm^{2}; 203 psi)
- Heating surface
  - Firebox: 15.0 m^{2} (161 sq ft)
  - Tubes: 105.6 m^{2} (1,137 sq ft)
  - Flues: 75.25 m^{2} (810.0 sq ft)
  - Total surface: 195.85 m^{2} (2,108.1 sq ft)
- Superheater
  - Heating area: 72.50 m^{2} (780.4 sq ft)
- Cylinders: Three
- Cylinder size: 600 mm × 660 mm (23 5/8 in × 26 in)
- Valve gear: Heusinger (Walschaerts)
Performance figures
- Maximum speed: 80 km/h (50 mph)
- Indicated power: 1,500 PS (1,100 kW; 1,480 hp)
- Tractive effort: 280 kN (62,900 lbf)
Career
- Operators: Deutsche Reichsbahn
- Official name: 85 001 – 85 010
- Retired: 1961

The Class 85 was a German goods train tank engine and standard locomotive (Einheitslok) with the Deutsche Reichsbahn.

== History ==
In 1931, the DRG ordered ten locomotives from the firm of Henschel that were taken into the fleet as numbers 85 001 to 85 010. The Class 85 was intended for hauling passenger and goods trains. They were however also employed as pusher locomotives on the Höllentalbahn in the Black Forest. Thanks to this engine, the Höllental Railway could do away with rack railway operations from 1933. The running gear and the superheated system were taken from the Class 44. The boiler, with a few minor alterations, was the same as that of the Class 62. All the locomotives were stabled at the Freiburg shed. Apart from number 85 004, which was lost in the Second World War, all the engines were in operation in the Black Forest until 1961, the year the route was converted from experimental electrical operations with 20 kV/50 Hz lines to the usual Deutsche Bundesbahn standard of 15 kV 16.7 Hz AC. One engine, number 85 007, was still in service in Wuppertal until the end of the year, but they were all retired by the beginning of the next year.

== Preserved locomotives ==
Number 85 007 belongs to the town of Freiburg im Breisgau. It is not operational, but is maintained by the Bahn-Sozialwerk-Gruppe. The engine is housed in the former locomotive shed.
