= TCDD 5701 Class =

Class of locomotive

5701 class
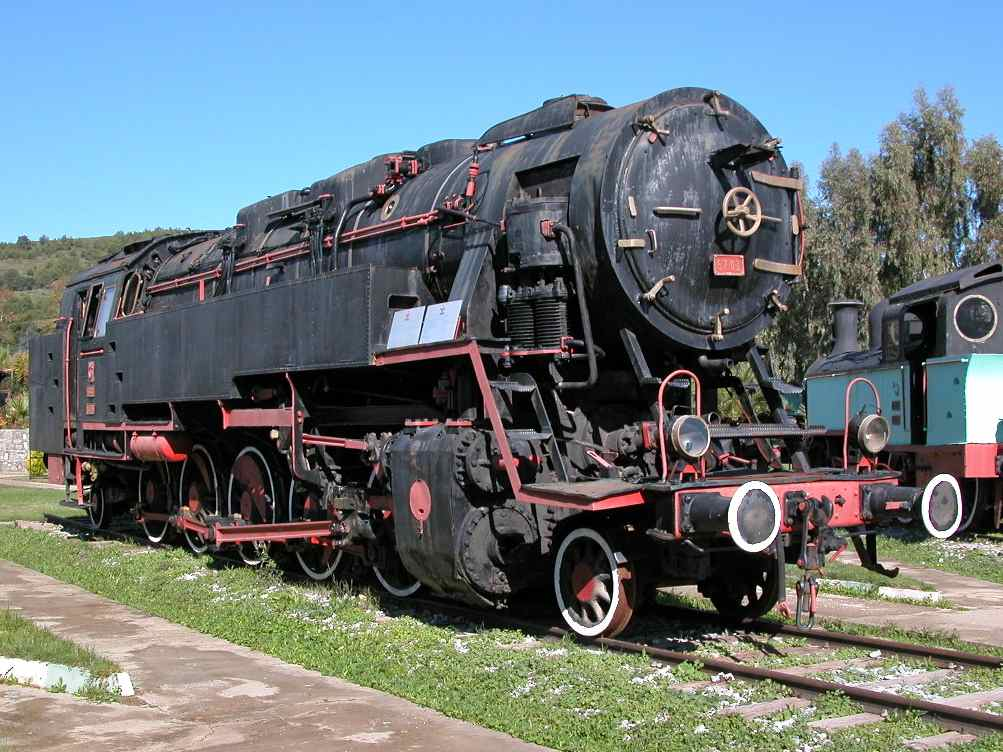
Type and origin
- Power type: Steam
- Builder: Henschel & Son (2), Arnold Jung Lokomotivfabrik (2)
- Build date: 1951-52
- Total produced: 4
Specifications
- Configuration
  - Whyte: 2-10-2T
- Gauge: 1,435 mm (4 ft 8 1/2 in)
- Fuel type: coal
Career
- Number in class: 4
- Disposition: 1 preserved, remainder scrapped

The TCDD (Turkish Republic Railways) 5701 Class is a class of 2-10-2 side tank steam locomotives for banking at Bilecik. They were the last new main line steam locomotives built for TCDD. Two were built by Henschel in 1951 and two by Arnold Jung Lokomotivfabrik in 1952 based on the German DRG BR 85. The first member of the class, 5701, survives at the Çamlık Railway Museum.
