= Einheitsdampflokomotive =

Standard German steam locomotive

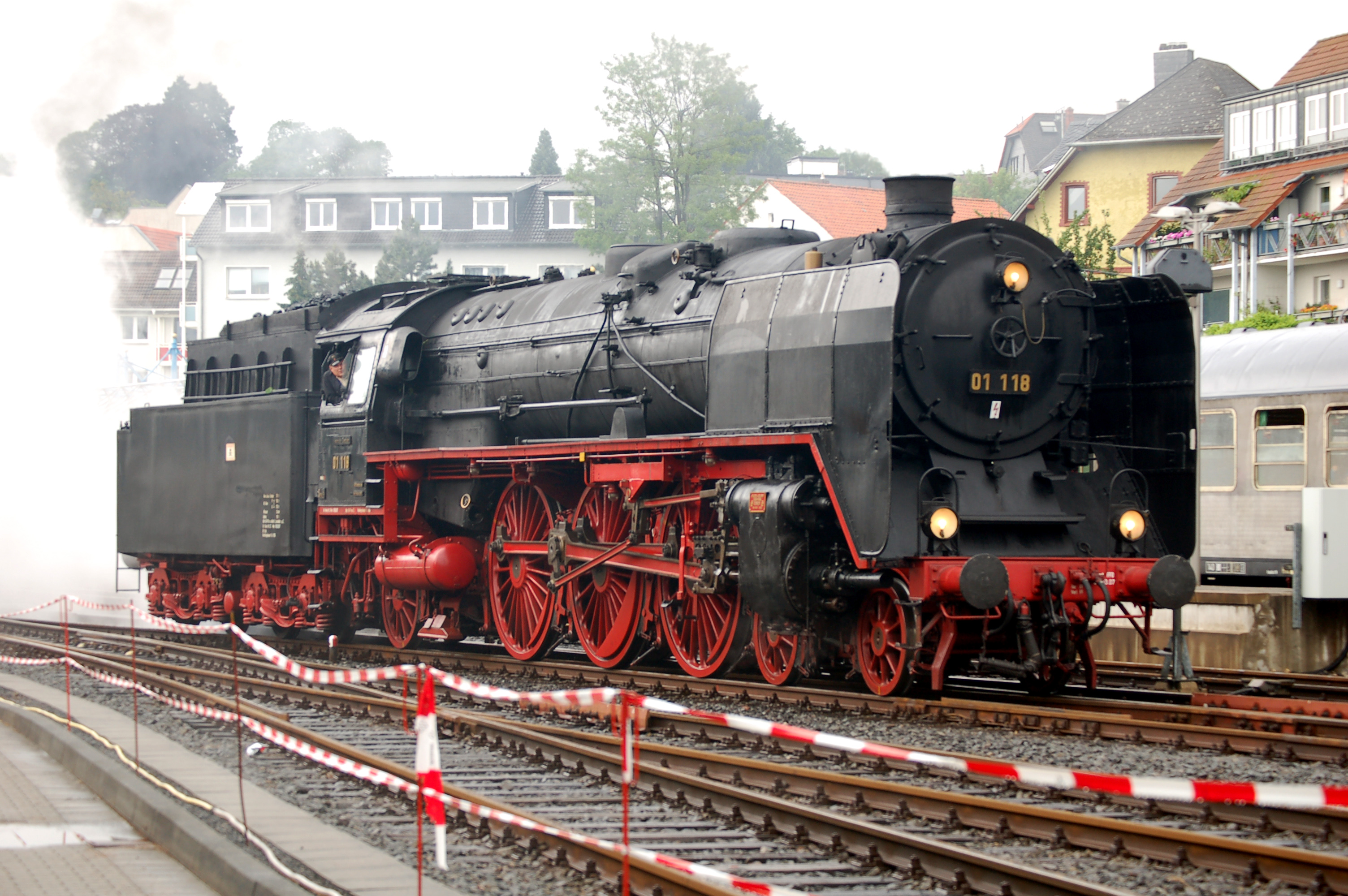
Einheitsdampflok class 01 of the Deutsche Reichsbahn in the Historic Railway, Frankfurt DRG Class 01 in 2007

The Einheitsdampflokomotiven ("standard steam locomotives"), sometimes shortened to Einheitslokomotiven, Einheitsloks, Einheitsdampfloks or simply Dampflok, were the standardized steam locomotives built in Germany after 1925 under the direction of the Deutsche Reichsbahn. Their manufacture made extensive use of standard design features, and components.

== Development ==
Following the merger of the state railways (Länderbahnen) in Germany into the Reich railway in 1920 and into the Deutsche Reichsbahn-Gesellschaft in 1924, the locomotive fleet of the new national railway administration still had 210 different types and classes of steam engine. This considerably hindered the flexible employment of locomotives within the railway network, and servicing and maintenance was very costly as a result of the large number of different spare parts that had to be stocked. In addition, production tolerances of individual components were so small that, often, even components for the same class of locomotive could only be used after further finishing work had been carried out.

On top of that, substantial reparations as a result of the First World War, 1914–18, considerably reduced the rolling stock of the German railways without regard to the variety of classes. Thus out of the 33,000 locomotives in the fleet (as at 1917), 8,000 had to be handed over. There was therefore a need to build new locomotives and to introduce a sensible degree of standardisation in procuring these new engines.

To that end a locomotive standards committee was convened by the Reichsbahn. Even representatives of the locomotive industry took part in this standardisation process. Initially the question was posed as to whether proven state railway classes should continue to be built or whether new, modern locomotives should be developed and ordered. Because the basic concepts for the new locomotives had not been decided, however, and in order to give the locomotive factories follow-on orders, it was decided in 1921 to continue to build proven state railway classes to begin with. These classes were given new Reichsbahn classifications. Amongst them were the Prussian P 8 (Class 38.10), the Prussian P 10 (Class 39), the Prussian G 12 (Class 58.10) and the Prussian T 20 (Class 95), all of which continued to be manufactured until 1925. The Bavarian S 3/6 (Class 18.5) was even procured right up to 1930. The Prussian G 12 (Class 58.10), which was not developed until 1917, effectively counted as the first German Einheitslok, because it was employed by almost all the state railways and built by several locomotive factories across the whole Reich.

Technical and economic factors, as well as the Reichsbahn's aim of improving main lines to handle a standard axle load of 20 tons, led to the decision to develop new types of locomotive. After heated debates in the locomotive committee (e.g. about the design of the boilers and fireboxes as well as the choice between two-cylinder layouts or four-cylinder compounds), the design principles and a programme for the development of standard Deutsche Reichsbahn locomotive classes emerged, of which the first were built in 1925. Playing a decisive role in these discussions was the head of the Grunewald Locomotive Research Office at that time, Richard Paul Wagner.

In fact the production of engines in the desired quantities could not be achieved at first, both for economic reasons and due to delays in the improvement of routes to take the higher axle loads. Of the classes with a 20-ton axle load - 01, 02, 43 and 44 - only small pre-production numbers were procured at first. Up to the end of the 1930s the state railway classes, taken over or re-ordered by the Reichsbahn, dominated the scene, in particular those of Prussian stock. The delay to the upgrade of routes also meant that additional classes with lower axle loads had to be developed, e.g. the classes 03 and 50.

In spite of the Deutsche Reichsbahn's ambitious plans, their actual acquisition of locomotives, even from 1925 onwards, only reached about one tenth of the average procurement quantities for the years 1914-1920 and it remained at this level until 1938. The causes of this were the worldwide economic crisis and the resulting reduction in demand for Reichsbahn's railway services. Not until 1930 was the 500th standard locomotive built (2% of the total fleet), in 1934 the 1000th engine was delivered (4% of the total) and in 1938 there were 1,500 Einheitsloks in existence (6% of the total).

Not until 1939 did the procurement quantities rise significantly. With the introduction of a production programme for simpler goods train locomotive designs, that led into the construction of the war locomotives (the Kriegsloks), engines with an axle load of 15 tons were built in significant quantities. Now, however, there was a different objective: supporting the conduct of the war. So by 1945 the total number of standard and war locomotives had climbed to about 14,500 (33% of the total fleet).

This state of affairs stood in stark contrast to the image promoted by the Deutsche Reichsbahn, that wanted to give the impression of a modern railway administration through its railway exhibitions, record speed runs, the introduction of the SVT network and proud photographic news reports. In fact the low level of procurement was responsible for the fact that the average age of the locomotive fleet continued to rise in the years from 1925 to 1938.

== Design Principles of the Einheitsdampflok ==
In many cases, rivetted plate locomotive frames were used on the older steam locomotives as a support for the running gear and engine. For reasons of stability, this frame had to be of a certain height. To meet the increasing demands in performance on the newer engines, a larger boiler was required, for which there was not enough room for the high-sided plate frame. As a result, the new Einheitslokomotiven had a lower and more solid bar frame. In addition, the higher performance demanded, required a larger boiler heating area; this was achieved by extending the boiler barrel.

The use of individual components or systems such as, for example, the boiler, the carrying bogies, etc., for as many classes as possible, enabled considerable savings to be achieved in construction, in repair and in the stocks of spares parts needed.

So, just externally, German Einheitsdampflokomotiven can be recognised from their bar frame, their large, long boilers and corresponding short chimneys, the standardised appearance of systems like the bogies, driver's cabs and associated tenders, as well as the typical, large Wagner smoke deflectors and, later, the smaller and more elegant Witte deflectors in front of the smokestacks.

Numerous improvements and optimisations were carried out on the new designs. For example, in the boiler, the heating areas and tube cross-sections were more carefully matched to one another to make best use of heat generation. At the same time the flow of smoke gases was optimised by the superheater tube system to minimise suction draught. The low position of the blast pipe in the larger smokebox at the front of the boiler is the least visible feature of the Einheitslokomotiven.

== Type Diversification ==
The Reichsbahn tried to have the fewest possible number of locomotive classes in operation and to make maximum use of the permitted axle loads, which were dependent on the type of track bed. The sequence of construction for the Einheitsloks was driven by operational requirements and the age of the state railway classes to be replaced.

=== Express and Passenger Train Locomotives ===
As a result, after 1925, the DRG Class 01, two-cylinder, express train locomotive emerged first, with a power of about 2,200 PS (1,600 kW; 2,200 hp) and 4-6-2 wheel arrangement. It was intended to relieve the DRG Class 17s, that consisted mainly of Prussian S 10s, Saxon XII Hs and Bavarian S 3/5s with their four-cylinder, superheated, compound configuration and 4-6-0 wheel arrangement. With a power of about 1,500 PS (1,100 kW; 1,500 hp) and top speeds of around 110 km/h (68 mph), they no longer met the operating requirements.

The Class 02 was an attempt to produce an Einheitslok with a 4-cylinder, superheated compound engine. The state railways had had early and positive experience with this configuration, their engines being grouped into Reichsbahn classes 17 (4-6-0, 2´C h4v), 18.3, 18.4-5 (4-6-2, 2’C1’ h4v) and 19 (2-8-2, 1´D1´ h4v). In spite of its higher power and lower fuel consumption, however, higher maintenance costs meant that the Class 02 did not go into full production. Even the ten express train locomotives that were procured were later converted to two-cylinder engines.

After 1930, it was followed by the Class 03, which was a locomotive for light express trains on routes with rails designed for lower loads (maximum axle loads of 18 t (20 short tons; 18 long tons) and locomotive powers of about 2,000 PS (1,500 kW; 2,000 hp)). The first pilot tests for high speed locomotives were carried out on this engine, and demonstrated that the riding qualities of a 2-cylinder locomotive at 140 km/h (87 mph) were still good.

The development of high speed engines continued in 1935 with the appearance of the Class 05 locomotive, which was also designed to standard locomotive principles, although only 3 examples were produced. The Class 05 was permitted to travel regularly at a top speed of 175 km/h (109 mph) and set the world speed record for steam engines of 200 km/h (120 mph). This record was later officially beaten by the English "Mallard", a LNER Class A4 locomotive, although criticism was expressed at the time that this took place on a descent and that the locomotive did not survive the record journey without damage.

Just two examples of the Class 06, a still larger locomotive with a 4-8-4 wheel arrangement and a permitted top speed of 140 km/h (87 mph), were built, because this class was unconvincing in terms of its riding qualities and the boiler characteristics.

In 1937 variants of classes 01 and 03 were developed with three cylinders as the Class 01.10 and Class 03.10. The third cylinder was located in the middle between the outer cylinders and its connecting rod drove the cranked first driving axle. Together with the setting of the side and centre cranks on the wheel circumference, this gave a quieter ride and the higher number of piston strokes per wheel rotation produced a higher acceleration that met the demands of express services. On delivery these engines were fitted with streamlined shells. These were later removed for maintenance reasons, initially in the area of the running gear and then completely, after the end of the war, particularly as the expected improvement in tractive effort at speeds over 140 km/h was less than expected.

For branch line operations, the 2-6-0 Class 24 passenger train locomotive was developed in 1926 with an axle load of 15 tons and 920 PS (680 kW; 910 hp). Nicknamed Steppenpferd (prairie horse), it was aimed at duties in East Prussia. As a tender locomotive it was intended for long journeys with a top speed of 90 km/h (56 mph) as well as for light fast trains (Eilzüge). From this locomotive a tank engine variant, the 2-6-2 Class 64, was developed for shuttle services on shorter routes. The 4-6-4 Class 62 locomotive was built for short main lines with numerous turn-arounds (termini). It had a top speed of 100 km/h (62 mph).

=== Goods Train Locomotives and Shunters ===
Because the improvement and replacement of the typical, former state railway, goods train locomotives such as the Prussian G 8.3 and G 8.2 would be necessary, standard goods train engines were procured too. First to appear after 1925 were the two-cylinder 2-10-0 locomotives of Class 43 and the three-cylinder Class 44s, each with a 20 t (22.0 short tons; 19.7 long tons) axle load. As part of the drive towards standardisation, many components, such as the boilers, were largely identical with those of the Class 01. The Class 85 was built as a 2-10-2 tank locomotive variant in 1932.

In 1928 the lighter 2-8-2 Class 86 tank engines arrived with a 15 t (17 short tons; 15 long tons) axle load, as well as the 2-6-2 Class 64 tank locomotives (many parts being identical to those of the Class 24) for passenger and goods traffic on branch lines.

The 2-8-2 Class 41 goods train locomotive (many of whose parts were the same as those of the Class 03) was designed for fast goods trains, e.g. for the transportation of fish and fruit. With its 1,600 mm (5 ft 3 in) wheel diameter it could reach a top speed of 90 km/h (56 mph). That put it within the range of light express train duties, for which it was often used e.g. on the Thuringian Forest lines (e.g. to Meiningen from Arnstadt and Eisenach). Other engines built to standard designs, albeit in smaller numbers, appeared from 1936 in the shape of the heavy and especially powerful 2-10-2 Class 45 goods train locomotives. In order to raise performance and improve economy, the boiler pressure on the Class 45 and other classes was experimentally increased to 20 bar (2,000 kPa; 290 psi). However the steel boiler used and the type of steel employed were not up to it, so that the pressure had to be reduced to the usual 16 bar (1,600 kPa; 230 psi). In many cases, the boilers were later completely replaced.

For shunting duties, the 0-6-0 Class 80 and the 0-8-0 Class 81 locomotive emerged in 1926 with a power of 860 PS (630 kW; 850 hp).

The ten-coupled Class 87 engines with their two Luttermöller cogwheel axles were built for operations on the very tight curves of Hamburg Harbour's railways. The 16 locomotives of this class were however retired as early as 1954 again because they tended to overheat at higher speeds and could only be used for shunting. As a replacement the Class 82, a new locomotive with Beugniot bogies was used.

=== Narrow Gauge Engines ===
The construction principles used for standard locomotives were also used for newly built narrow gauge engines in order to reduce the cost of servicing and maintenance.

Initially 32 Class 99.73-76 locomotives were built from 1928 to 1933 for the 750 mm (2 ft 5 1/2 in) Saxony narrow gauge railways. In 1929 the Class 99.22 was developed for the Prussian, Bavarian, Baden and Württemberg 1,000 mm (3 ft 3 3/8 in) railways. However, only 3 examples were built, all fitted with a Class 81 boiler. In 1932 the last narrow gauge Einheitslok appeared: the 900 mm (2 ft 11 7/16 in) Class 99.32. Three were built for the Bäderbahn ('Spa Line'), the line from Bad Doberan to Kühlungsborn.

== Literature ==
- Alfred B. Gottwaldt: Geschichte der deutschen Einheits-Lokomotiven. Franckh, Stuttgart 1978, ISBN 3-440-07941-4
- Alfred B. Gottwaldt: Deutsche Eisenbahnen im Zweiten Weltkrieg Franckh, Stuttgart 1983, ISBN 3-440-05161-7
- Manfred Weisbrod, Hans Müller, Wolfgang Petznick: Dampflokarchiv, Band 1–4. Transpress VEB Verlag für Verkehrswesen Berlin 1976–1981

== See also ==
- List of DRG locomotives and railbuses
