= Darmstadt-Kranichstein Railway Museum =

Museum in Germany

Coordinates: 49°54′28″N 8°40′45″E

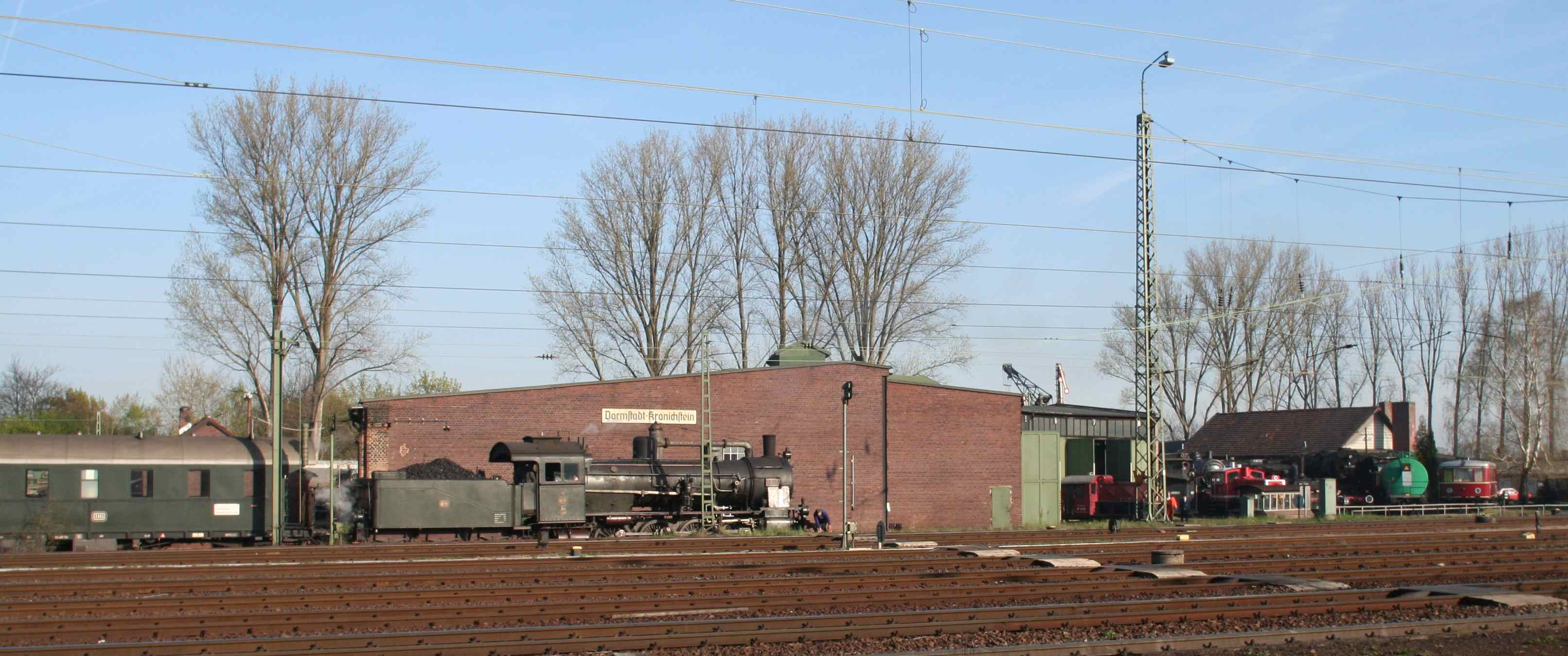
The Darmstadt-Kranichstein Railway Museum

The Darmstadt-Kranichstein Railway Museum (Eisenbahnmuseum Darmstadt-Kranichstein) is a railway museum in the German city of Darmstadt. It is also the largest railway museum in the state of Hesse.

The former railway depot (Bahnbetriebswerk or BW) includes a locomotive shed, turntable, coal bunkers and other locomotive facilities. There is also an adjoining repair shop (Ausbesserungswerk), where major repairs can be carried out.

The depot is located on the Rhine-Main line from Darmstadt to Aschaffenburg. It was established in 1898 by the United Prussian and Hessian State Railways and opened as a railway museum on 29 May 1976 when the site was leased from the Deutsche Bundesbahn to the board of trustees of the museum railway.

A large collection of locomotives may be viewed in the museum, such as the still-operational DRG 23 042, 01 1056, 41 024 and 44 404 steam engines, steam locomotive 4981 "Mainz", (a Prussian G 8) that was transferred from Turkey, the Austrian locomotive ÖBB 97 210, a rack railway steam engine from the Erzberg railway, the DB locomotive number 103 101-2 and the DRG E 16 08 electric engine, several DB Class V 36 diesel locomotives, a Wismar Railbus and a host of other railway vehicles, including several Culemeyer heavy trailers.

The large vehicle fleet cannot be visited at present. In the meantime, however, there are exhibits to aid technical understanding, such as the sectioned boiler of Deutsche Reichsbahn steam engine number 50 1397, and the driver's cab of 50 1745; as well as a signalling collection with historical signals and signal box equipment. In addition, the evolution of fare tickets over the years is portrayed, from manually produced examples from the early years to the present-day computer printouts, as well as their related equipment. The museum also has its own ticket-printing press. An H0-model railway layout depicts Darmstadt station on the Main-Neckar line at the time the route was opened.

Special train services visit the museum several times a year, running between Darmstadt Ost and Bessunger Forst.

Several vehicles, e. g. the 23 042 and the G8 4981 "Mainz" haul specials throughout the whole of Germany. The vehicles are run by the German Museum Railway GmbH (DME) as the operating company. (Deutsche Museums-Eisenbahn) GmbH (DME).

== Literature ==
- Uwe Breitmeier, Rückkehr aus dem Morgenland: die abenteuerliche Reise einer preußischen Dampflok, Transpress Verlag, Stuttgart 1997, ISBN 3-613-71065-X
- Uwe Breitmeier, Das Eisenbahnmuseum Darmstadt-Kranichstein, Eigenverlag
