= DRG Class 05 =

German steam locomotive class (1935–1958)

DRG Class 05 DB Class 05
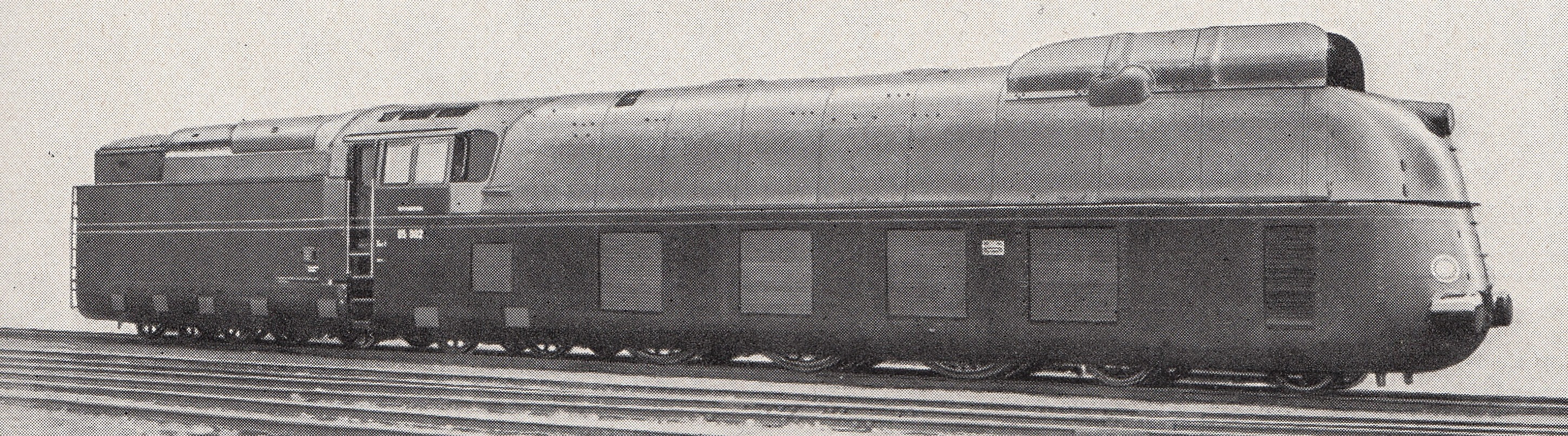
- 05 002 at Brockhaus, 1938
Type and origin
- Power type: Steam
- Builder: Borsig Lokomotiv Werke (Hennigsdorf)
- Serial number: 14552–14553, 14555
- Build date: 1935 (2), 1937 (1)
- Total produced: 3
Specifications
- Configuration
  - Whyte: 4-6-4
  - UIC: 2′C2′ h3
  - German: S 37.19
- Driver: Divided: inside cylinder to first coupled axle, outside cylinders to second
- Gauge: 1,435 mm (4 ft 8 1/2 in) (standard)
- Leading dia.: 1,100 mm (43 1/4 in)
- Driver dia.: 2,300 mm (90 1/2 in)
- Trailing dia.: 1,100 mm (43 1/4 in)
- Tender wheels: 1,100 mm (43 1/4 in)
- Wheelbase
  - Axle spacing (Asymmetrical): 2,350 mm (7 ft 8 1/2 in) +; 2,200 mm (7 ft 2 5/8 in) +; 2,550 mm (8 ft 4 3/8 in) +; 2,550 mm (8 ft 4 3/8 in) +; 2,250 mm (7 ft 4 5/8 in) +; 2,000 mm (6 ft 6 3/4 in) = *
  - Engine: 13,900 mm (45 ft 7 1/4 in)
  - Tender: 1,800 mm (5 ft 10 7/8 in) +; 1,450 mm (4 ft 9 1/8 in) +; 1,325 mm (4 ft 4 1/8 in) +; 1,325 mm (4 ft 4 1/8 in) =; 5,900 mm (19 ft 4 1/4 in)
  - incl. tender: 22,075 mm (72 ft 5 1/8 in)
- Length
  - Over headstocks: 24,965 mm (81 ft 10 7/8 in)
  - Over buffers: 26,265 mm (86 ft 2 in)
- Height: 4,550 mm (14 ft 11 1/8 in)
- Axle load: 001–002: 19.2 t (18.9 long tons; 21.2 short tons); 003: 19.6 t (19.3 long tons; 21.6 short tons), later 18.6 t (18.3 long tons; 20.5 short tons)
- Adhesive weight: 001–002: 57.6 t (56.7 long tons; 63.5 short tons); 003: 59.0 t (58.1 long tons; 65.0 short tons), later 56.0 t (55.1 long tons; 61.7 short tons)
- Empty weight: 001–002: 118.5 t (116.6 long tons; 130.6 short tons); 003: 118.6 t (116.7 long tons; 130.7 short tons), later 114.0 t (112.2 long tons; 125.7 short tons)
- Service weight: 001–002: 129.9 t (127.8 long tons; 143.2 short tons); 003: 129.5 t (127.5 long tons; 142.7 short tons), later 124.0 t (122.0 long tons; 136.7 short tons)
- Tender type: 001–002: 2′3 T 37 St; 003: 2′3K T 35, later 2′3 T 38.5
- Fuel type: Coal (Coal dust for 003 1937–1944)
- Fuel capacity: 001–002: 10 t (9.8 long tons; 11 short tons); 003: 10 t (9.8 long tons; 11 short tons), later 12 t (12 long tons; 13 short tons)
- Water cap.: 001–002: 2′3 T 37 St; 003: 2′3K T 35, later 2′3 T 38.5; 37 m^{3} (8,100 imp gal; 9,800 US gal)
- Firebox
  - Grate area: 001–002: 4.7 m^{2} (51 sq ft); 003: 4.40 m^{2} (47.4 sq ft)
- Boiler
  - Pitch: 3,170 mm (10 ft 4 3/4 in)
  - Tube plates: 001–002: 7,000 mm (22 ft 11 5/8 in); 003: 5,500 mm (18 ft 1/2 in)
  - Small tubes: 001–002: 70 mm (2 3/4 in), 106 off; 003: 54 mm (2 1/8 in), 137 off
  - Large tubes: 001–002: 171 mm (6 3/4 in), 24 off; 003: 143 mm (5 5/8 in), 35 off
- Boiler pressure: 20 bar (20.4 kgf/cm^{2}; 290 psi) (reduced to 16 bar (16.3 kgf/cm^{2}; 232 psi) in 1950)
- Heating surface
  - Firebox: 001–002: 18.5 m^{2} (199 sq ft); 003: 22.66 m^{2} (243.9 sq ft)
  - Tubes: 001–002: 151.3 m^{2} (1,629 sq ft); 003: 123.52 m^{2} (1,329.6 sq ft)
  - Flues: 001–002: 86.2 m^{2} (928 sq ft); 003: 81.72 m^{2} (879.6 sq ft)
  - Total surface: 001–002: 256.0 m^{2} (2,756 sq ft); 003: 227.95 m^{2} (2,453.6 sq ft)
- Superheater
  - Heating area: 001–002: 90.0 m^{2} (969 sq ft); 003: 81.9 m^{2} (882 sq ft)
- Cylinders: Three
- Cylinder size: 450 mm × 660 mm (17 11/16 in × 26 in)
- Valve gear: Heusinger/Walschaerts
Performance figures
- Maximum speed: Service: 175 km/h (109 mph); Test: 200.4 km/h (124.5 mph)
- Indicated power: 001–002: 2,360 PS (1,740 kW; 2,330 hp); 003: 2,400 PS (1,770 kW; 2,370 hp)
Career
- Numbers: 05 001 – 05 003
- Retired: 1958
- Disposition: One preserved, remainder scrapped
- * For 05 003 in cab-forward configuration, values should be read in reverse order

The DRG Class 05 was a class of three Deutsche Reichsbahn 4-6-4 steam locomotives (2′C2′ h3 in the UIC notation) used on express passenger trains in continental Europe. They were part of the DRG's standard locomotive (Einheitslokomotive) series. It held the world speed record for steam locomotives between May 1936 and March 1938, when it was bested by the Mallard.

== Pre World War II history ==
Following the success of the diesel high speed trains like the Flying Hamburger in the middle of the 1930s, the German locomotive industry turned to faster steam locomotives. After speed tests with a streamlined DRG Class 03 the Borsig locomotive factories (Note: The Borsig factory was moved from Tegel to Hennigsdorf after the takeover of Borsig by AEG, and production took place at both sites.) produced three engines:

- 05 001 as streamlined in 1935
- 05 002 as streamlined in 1935; This engine broke the world speed record in 1936 at 124.5 mph (200.4 km/h)
- 05 003 as cab forward streamlined in 1937

The locomotives did regular service in FD express passenger trains, e.g. FD 23 from Hamburg to Berlin. The design speed was 175 km/h (109 mph). In 1944, the streamline plates were removed. 05 003 had been rebuilt and lost the cab forward design.

== World high speed records ==
05 001 and 05 002 were mainly used for test runs from 1935 to 1936. Most of these runs were made on complete journeys between Hamburg and Berlin. On 7 June 1935 the 05 002 made a top speed of 191.7 km/h (119.1 mph) near Berlin. The same engine made six more runs with more than 177 km/h (110 mph) with trains up to 254 t (250 long tons; 280 short tons) weight. On 11 May 1936 it set the world speed record for steam locomotives after reaching 200.4 km/h (124.5 mph) on the Berlin–Hamburg line hauling a 197 t (194 long tons; 217 short tons) train. The engine power was more than 2,535 kW (3,399 ihp)). This record was broken two years later by the British LNER Class A4 4468 Mallard engine, on a slightly downhill line but with a heavier (240 ton) train. On 30 May 1936 the 05 002 set an unbroken start stop speed record for steam locomotives: During the return run from a 190 km/h test Berlin-Hamburg it did the ~113 kilometres (70 miles) from Wittenberge to a signal stop before Berlin-Spandau in 48 min 32 s, meaning 139.4 km/h (86.6 mph) average between start and stop.

== Post-War history ==
After World War II, the three locomotives came to the engine shop in Hamm, Westphalia. Since there were only three members of the class, DB considered scrapping them. However, the engines were sent to Krauss-Maffei to be restored. 05 003 went into regular service in 1950, the other two in 1951. Boiler pressure was reduced to 16 bar or 230 psi, meaning the engines lost some of their old power. All three locomotives were used to haul express trains until 1958.

The class mostly hauled the FD (long-distance express) trains "Hanseat" and "Domspatz" on the run Hamburg - Cologne - Frankfurt. The regular top speed of the trains was 140 km/h (87 mph). On this 703 km (437 mi) run the 05 operated trains did the longest run with steam traction in the DB network. In July 1958 the 05 were replaced by the diesel-hydraulic DB Class V 200.

05 001 went to the Verkehrsmuseum Nürnberg, where it can be seen streamlined in large parts - the drivetrain on the right hand side remains visible - in its original red livery. The other two locomotives were scrapped in 1960.

== Gallery ==
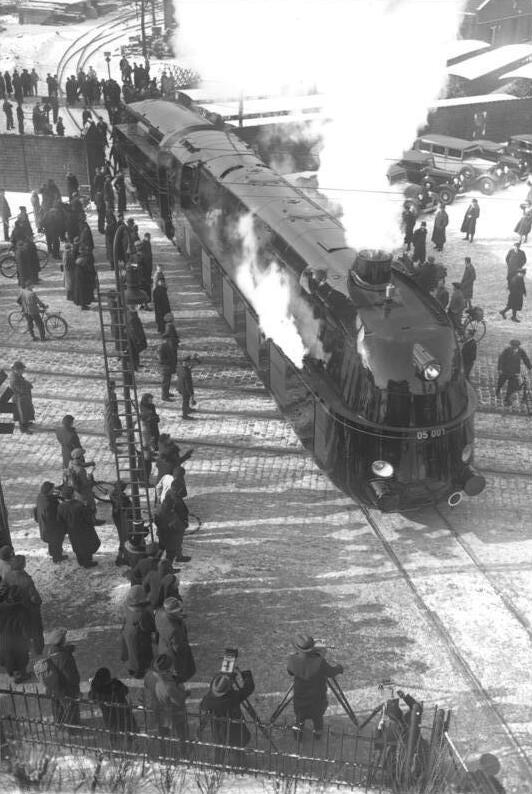
05 001 on delivery

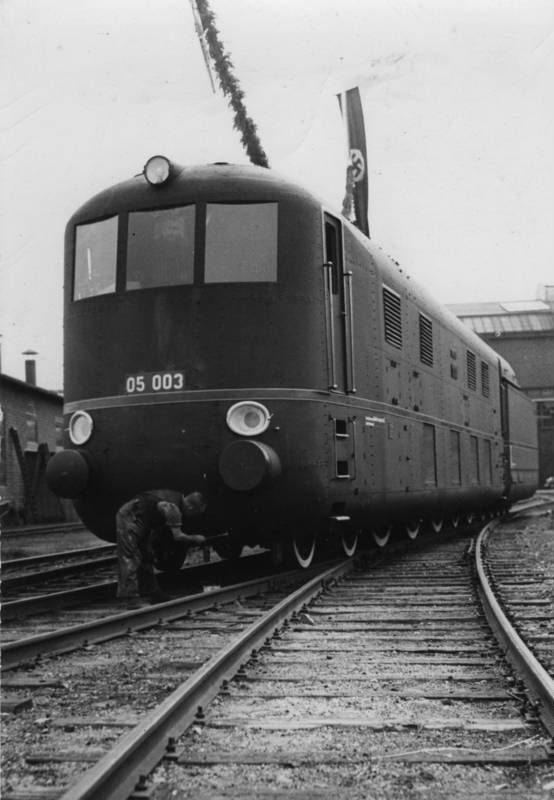
The streamlined cab forward 05 003

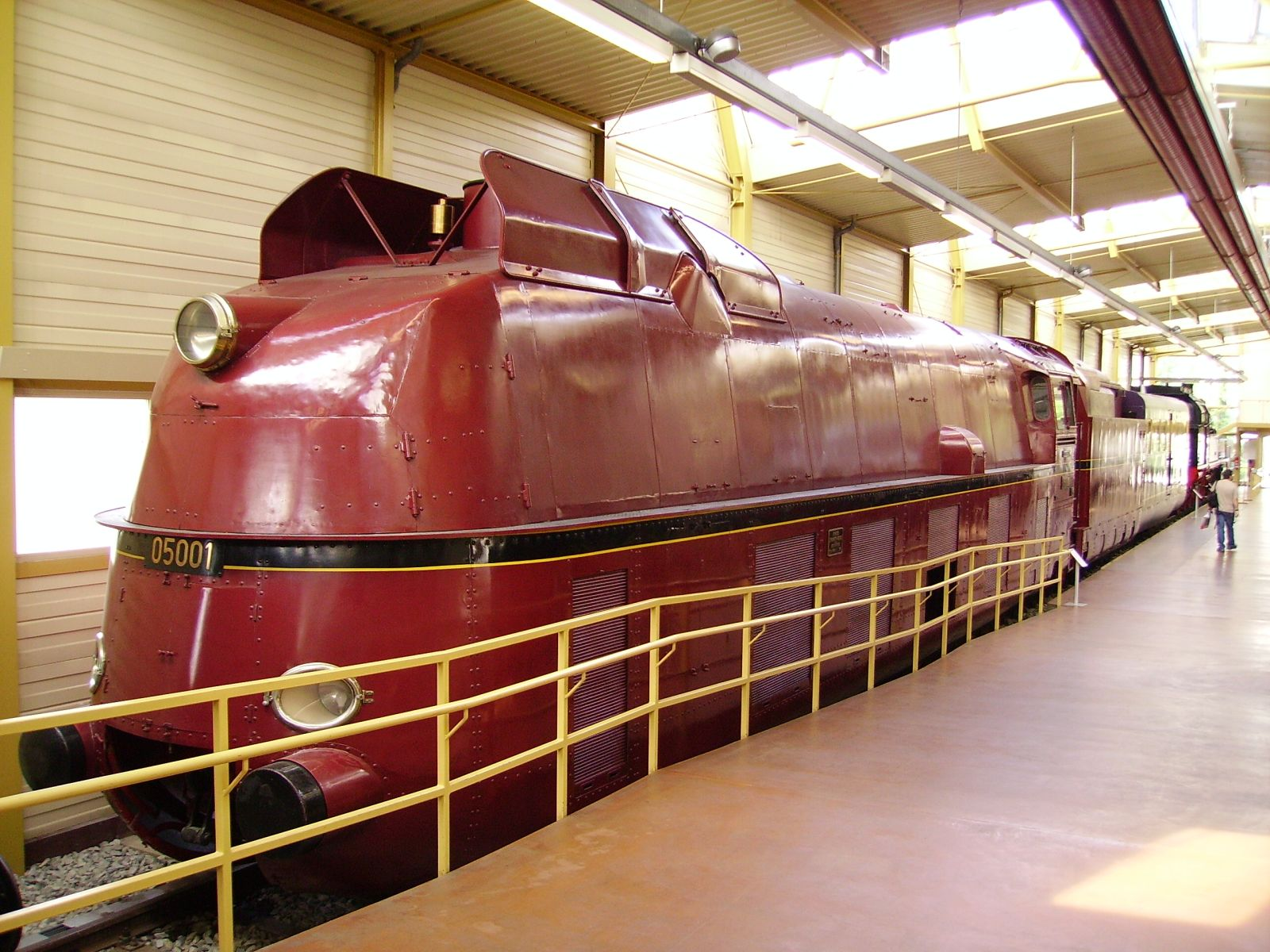
05 001 in the Nuremberg Transport Museum
