= DRG Class 43 =

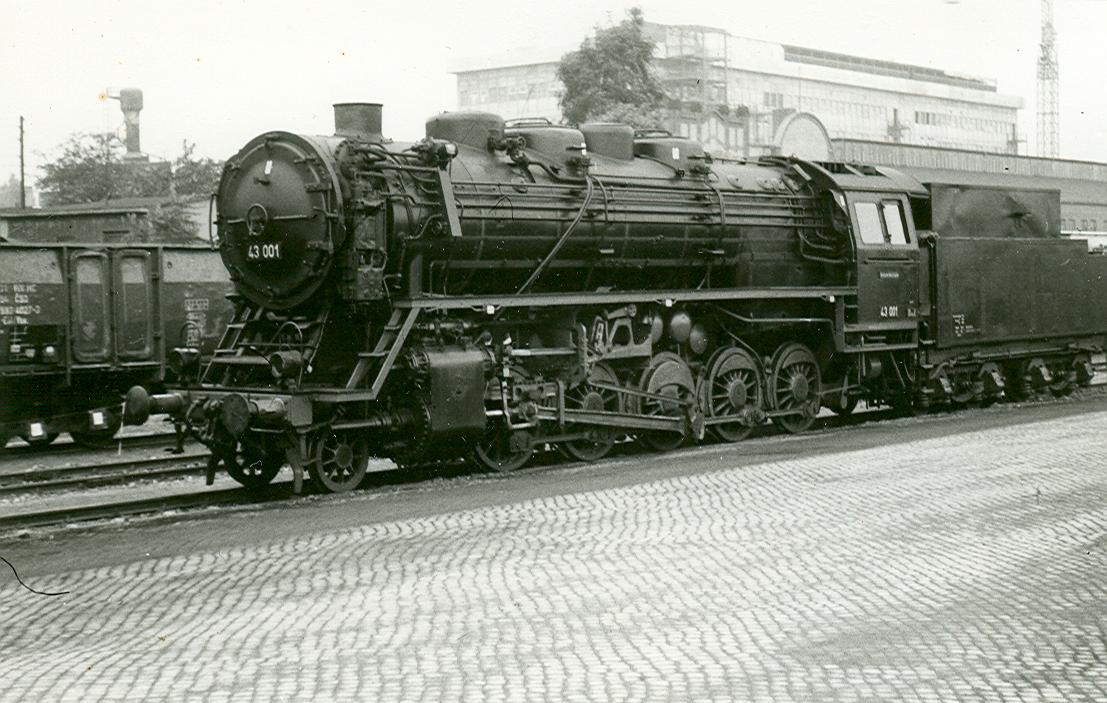
- 43 001 in 1972
Type and origin
- Power type: Steam
- Builder: Henschel & Sohn (23); Berliner Maschinenbau (12)
- Build date: 1926–1928
- Total produced: 35
Specifications
- Configuration
  - Whyte: 2-10-0
  - UIC: 1′E h2
  - German: G 56.20
- Gauge: 1,435 mm (4 ft 8 1/2 in)
- Leading dia.: 850 mm (33 1/2 in)
- Driver dia.: 1,400 mm (55 1/8 in)
- Tender wheels: 1,000 mm (39 3/8 in)
- Wheelbase
  - Axle spacing (Asymmetrical): 2,850 mm (9 ft 4 1/4 in) +; 1,700 mm (5 ft 6 7/8 in) +; 1,700 mm (5 ft 6 7/8 in) +; 1,700 mm (5 ft 6 7/8 in) +; 1,700 mm (5 ft 6 7/8 in) =
  - Engine: 9,650 mm (31 ft 7 7/8 in)
  - Tender: 1,900 mm (6 ft 2 3/4 in) +; 1,900 mm (6 ft 2 3/4 in) +; 1,900 mm (6 ft 2 3/4 in) =; 5,700 mm (18 ft 8 3/8 in)
  - incl. tender: 19,185 mm (62 ft 11 3/8 in)
- Length
  - Over headstocks: 21,315 mm (69 ft 11 1/8 in)
  - Over buffers: 22,615 mm (74 ft 2 3/8 in)
- Height: 4,550 mm (14 ft 11 1/8 in)
- Axle load: 19.3 t (19.0 long tons; 21.3 short tons)
- Adhesive weight: 96.6 t (95.1 long tons; 106.5 short tons)
- Empty weight: 100.9 t (99.3 long tons; 111.2 short tons)
- Service weight: 110.8 t (109.1 long tons; 122.1 short tons)
- Tender type: 2′2′ T 32
- Fuel type: Coal
- Fuel capacity: 10.0 t (9.8 long tons; 11.0 short tons)
- Water cap.: 32.0 m^{3} (7,000 imp gal; 8,500 US gal)
- Firebox
  - Grate area: 4.7 m^{2} (51 sq ft)
- Boiler
  - Pitch: 3,150 mm (10 ft 4 in)
  - Tube plates: 5,800 mm (19 ft 3/8 in)
  - Small tubes: 54 mm (2 1/8 in), 127 off
  - Large tubes: 143 mm (5 5/8 in), 43 off
- Boiler pressure: 14 bar (14.3 kgf/cm^{2}; 203 psi)
- Heating surface
  - Firebox: 18.0 m^{2} (194 sq ft)
  - Tubes: 113.0 m^{2} (1,216 sq ft)
  - Flues: 106.0 m^{2} (1,141 sq ft)
  - Total surface: 237.0 m^{2} (2,551 sq ft)
- Superheater
  - Heating area: 100.0 m^{2} (1,076 sq ft)
- Cylinders: Two, outside
- Cylinder size: 720 mm × 660 mm (28 3/8 in × 26 in)
- Valve gear: Heusinger (Walschaerts)
Performance figures
- Maximum speed: 70 km/h (43 mph)
- Indicated power: 1,880 PS (1,380 kW; 1,850 hp)
Career
- Operators: Deutsche Reichsbahn; Deutsche Reichsbahn (GDR)
- Numbers: 43 001 – 43 035
- Retired: 1968

The German locomotives of DRG Class 43 were standard (see Einheitsdampflokomotive) goods train engines with the Deutsche Reichsbahn.

== History ==
This was the second class that was built on the Einheitslok principle. According to the first classification scheme of the DR's Standardisation Bureau, 2-10-0 goods train locomotives were to be procured with a 20-ton axle load. To achieve this a two-cylinder class (the Class 43) and a three-cylinder class (the Class 44) were envisaged, because it was not yet known which configuration would be more economical. Ten examples of each class were procured in parallel. The Class 43 was supplied by Henschel and by Schwartzkopff.

In trials it was discovered that the Class 43 was more economical to operate at powers under 1500 PSi. As a result, a further 25 examples of the 43 were ordered up to 1928. However, due to the increase in goods train speeds in the 1930s, the Class 44 was given priority thereafter because, in addition to its economy when running at higher speeds and the better running qualities of its three-cylinder driving gear, it was also cleared for running at up to 80 km/h. As a result, no more Class 43s were ordered.

In the literature statements are often found that the locomotive was not sufficiently powerful overall. In response to that, number 43 013 was loaded for testing purposes with a train of 5000 tons – that is more than twice that given in the haulage tables – and headed it without complaint. In doing so, 43 013 is a record holder. Never before or since has any German locomotive hauled such a load.

The Class 43s, which had operating numbers 43 001 – 43 035, all remained with the DR in East Germany after the Second World War. In 1960, the remaining engines were once again modernised, the powerful boiler even enabled goods trains greater than the maximum allowable load to be hauled. This led, however, to frame damage, that the Reichsbahn could not repair. So the machines were rapidly retired, the last one being taken out of service in 1968 at Cottbus locomotive depot. Locomotive 43 001 became a museum locomotive and belongs to the Dresden Transport Museum, but is in the Saxon Railway Museum, a former home depot of the Class 43.

The engines of this class were equipped with a 2′2′ T 32 tender.

== See also ==
- List of DRG locomotives and railbuses
- List of preserved steam locomotives in Germany
