= DRG Class 02 =

Class of German 4-6-2 locomotives (1925-1942)

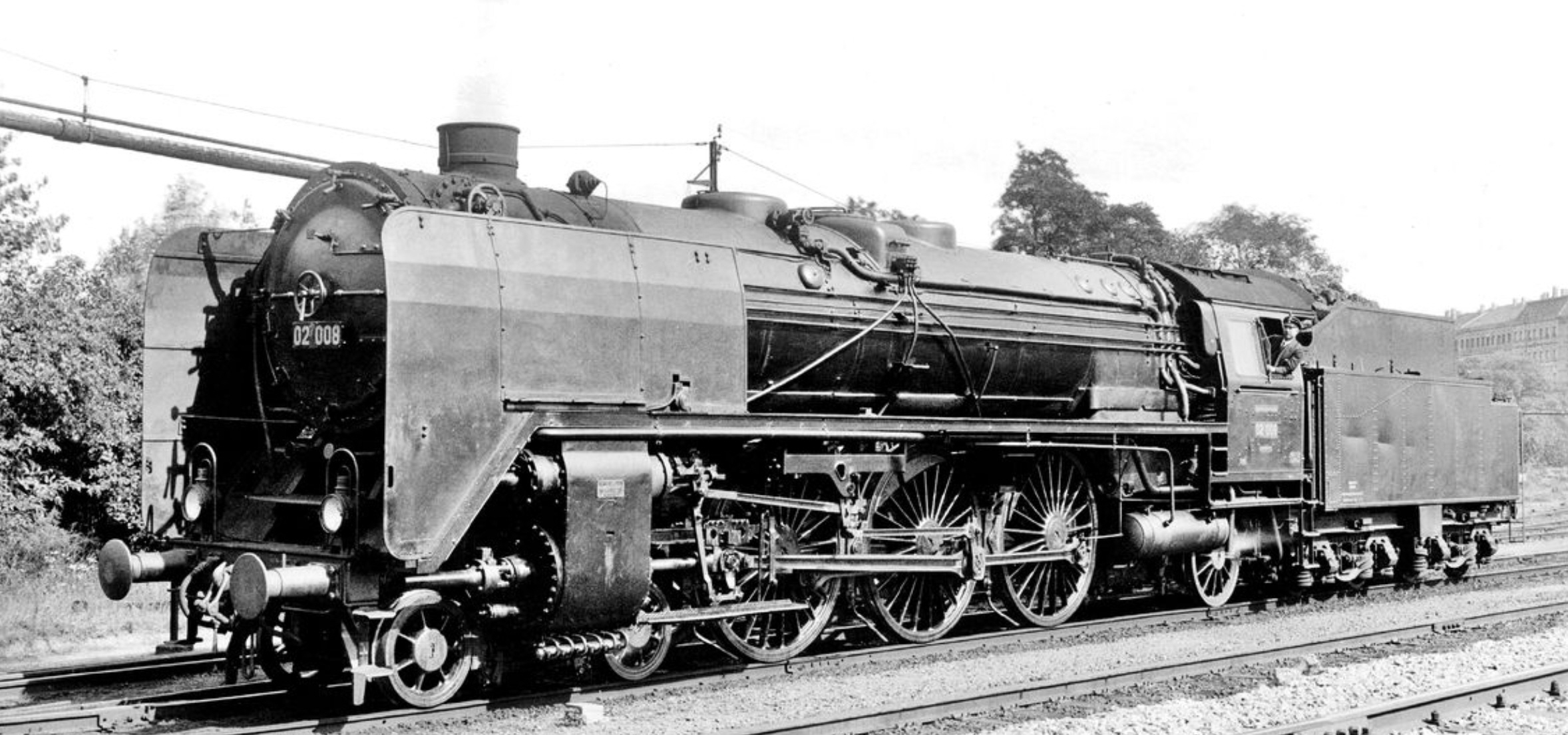
- 02 008 in June 1932
Type and origin
- Power type: Steam
- Builder: Henschel & Sohn (8); Maffei (2)
- Serial number: Henschel 20460–20467; Maffei 5621–5622
- Build date: 1925–1926
- Total produced: 10
Specifications
- Configuration
  - Whyte: 4-6-2
  - UIC: 2′C1′ h4v
  - German: S 36.20
- Driver: 2nd coupled axle for all cylinders
- Gauge: 1,435 mm (4 ft 8 1/2 in)
- Leading dia.: 850 mm (33 1/2 in)
- Driver dia.: 2,000 mm (78 3/4 in)
- Trailing dia.: 1,250 mm (49 1/4 in)
- Wheelbase
  - Axle spacing (Asymmetrical): 2,200 mm (7 ft 2 5/8 in) +; 1,800 mm (5 ft 10 7/8 in) +; 2,300 mm (7 ft 6 1/2 in) +; 2,300 mm (7 ft 6 1/2 in) +; 3,800 mm (12 ft 5 5/8 in)
  - incl. tender: 20,320 mm (66 ft 8 in)
- Length
  - Over buffers: 23,750 mm (77 ft 11 in)
- Height: 4.550 m (14 ft 11 1/8 in)
- Axle load: 20.1 tonnes (19.8 long tons; 22.2 short tons)
- Adhesive weight: 60.3 tonnes (59.3 long tons; 66.5 short tons)
- Empty weight: 103.9 tonnes (102.3 long tons; 114.5 short tons)
- Service weight: 113.5 tonnes (111.7 long tons; 125.1 short tons)
- Tender type: 2′2 T 32 (2′2 T 30)
- Fuel type: Coal
- Fuel capacity: 10.0 tonnes (9.8 long tons; 11.0 short tons)
- Water cap.: 32 or 30 m^{3} (7,040 or 6,600 imp gal; 8,450 or 7,930 US gal)
- Firebox
  - Grate area: 4.41 m^{2} (47.5 sq ft)
- Boiler
  - Pitch: 3,100 mm (10 ft 2 in)
  - Tube plates: 5,800 mm (19 ft 3/8 in)
  - Small tubes: 54 mm (2 1/8 in), 129 off
  - Large tubes: 143 mm (5 5/8 in), 43 off
- Boiler pressure: 16 bar (16.3 kgf/cm^{2}; 232 psi)
- Heating surface
  - Firebox: 17.0 m^{2} (183 sq ft)
  - Tubes: 115.18 m^{2} (1,239.8 sq ft)
  - Flues: 105.38 m^{2} (1,134.3 sq ft)
  - Total surface: 237.56 m^{2} (2,557.1 sq ft)
- Superheater
  - Heating area: 100.0 m^{2} (1,076 sq ft)
- Cylinders: Four (compound): two high-pressure (HP) inside, two low-pressure (LP) outside
- High-pressure cylinder: 460 mm × 660 mm (18 1/8 in × 26 in)
- Low-pressure cylinder: 720 mm × 660 mm (28 3/8 in × 26 in)
- Valve gear: Walschaerts (Heusinger)
- Train heating: Steam
- Loco brake: Knorr single-chamber, compressed air brakes, operating on front of all coupled wheels
Performance figures
- Maximum speed: fwds: 130 km/h (81 mph); bwds: 50 km/h (31 mph)
- Indicated power: 2,300 PS (1,690 kW; 2,270 hp)
Career
- Numbers: DRG 02 001 to 02 010
- Disposition: Rebuilt to DRG Class 01 (1937–1942)

The German DRG Class 02 (Baureihe 02 or BR 02) engines were standard (Einheitslokomotiven) express train locomotives with the Deutsche Reichsbahn-Gesellschaft. Number 02 001 was the first Einheitsdampflokomotive in the DRG to be completed.

In procuring a standard express train steam locomotive, the Deutsche Reichsbahn carried out a comparison between a superheated two-cylinder type (the DRG Class 01) and a four-cylinder compound locomotive (the Class 02). Ten examples of each type were built from 1925, and the Class 02 vehicles were given operating numbers 02 001 – 02 010. The first eight engines were manufactured in 1925 by the firm of Henschel, two more were built in 1926 by Maffei.

Because the Class 02 steam engines were badly designed, the compound engine could only produce a high level of power at speeds of over 70 km/h. In addition, below 100 PSi its steam consumption was higher than that of the Class 01.

Compared with the Class 01s, these engines had a complicated, and therefore maintenance-intensive, drive; as a result no more were ordered. From 1937 to 1942 the vehicles were successively converted to two-cylinder simple operation and regrouped as Class 01s with the new numbers 01 011 and 01 233 to 01 241.

The first eight engines were equipped with 2'2' T 30 tenders; the other two with 2'2 T 32 tenders. Later on, the second tender was coupled to all of the first eight engines as well.

== See also ==
- List of DRG locomotives and railbuses

== Literature ==
- Maidment, David (2017). The German Pacific Locomotive: Its Design and Development. Locomotive Portfolios series. Barnsley, South Yorkshire, UK: Pen & Sword Transport. ISBN 9781473852495.
- Deutsche Eisenbahnen (in German). Weltbild Verlag.
- Weisbrod, Manfred; Petznick, Wolfgang. Baureihe 01 (in German). Transpress Verlag.
- Großes Lok-Portrait 01.05 (in German). Freiburg: EK Verlag.
- Hütter, Ingo (2009). Die Dampflokomotiven der Baureihen 01 bis 45 der DRG, DRB, DB, und DR (in German). Werl: DGEG Medien. p. 73. ISBN 978-3-937189-45-1.
- Koschinski, Konrad (2006). Legendäre Baureihe 01. Eisenbahn-Journal (in German) (Sonderausgabe 2006,2 ed.). Verlagsgruppe Bahn. ISBN 3-89610-156-0.
- Weisbrod, Manfred; Müller, Hans; Petznik, Wolfgang (1976). Dampflokomotiven deutscher Eisenbahnen, Baureihe 01–39 (EFA 1.1) (in German) (3rd ed.). Düsseldorf: Alba Buchverlag. pp. 36–38, 242. ISBN 3-87094-081-6.
