= DRG Class 03 =

Class of 298 German two-cylinder 4-6-2 locomotives

DRG Class 03 DB Class 003 PKP class Pm2
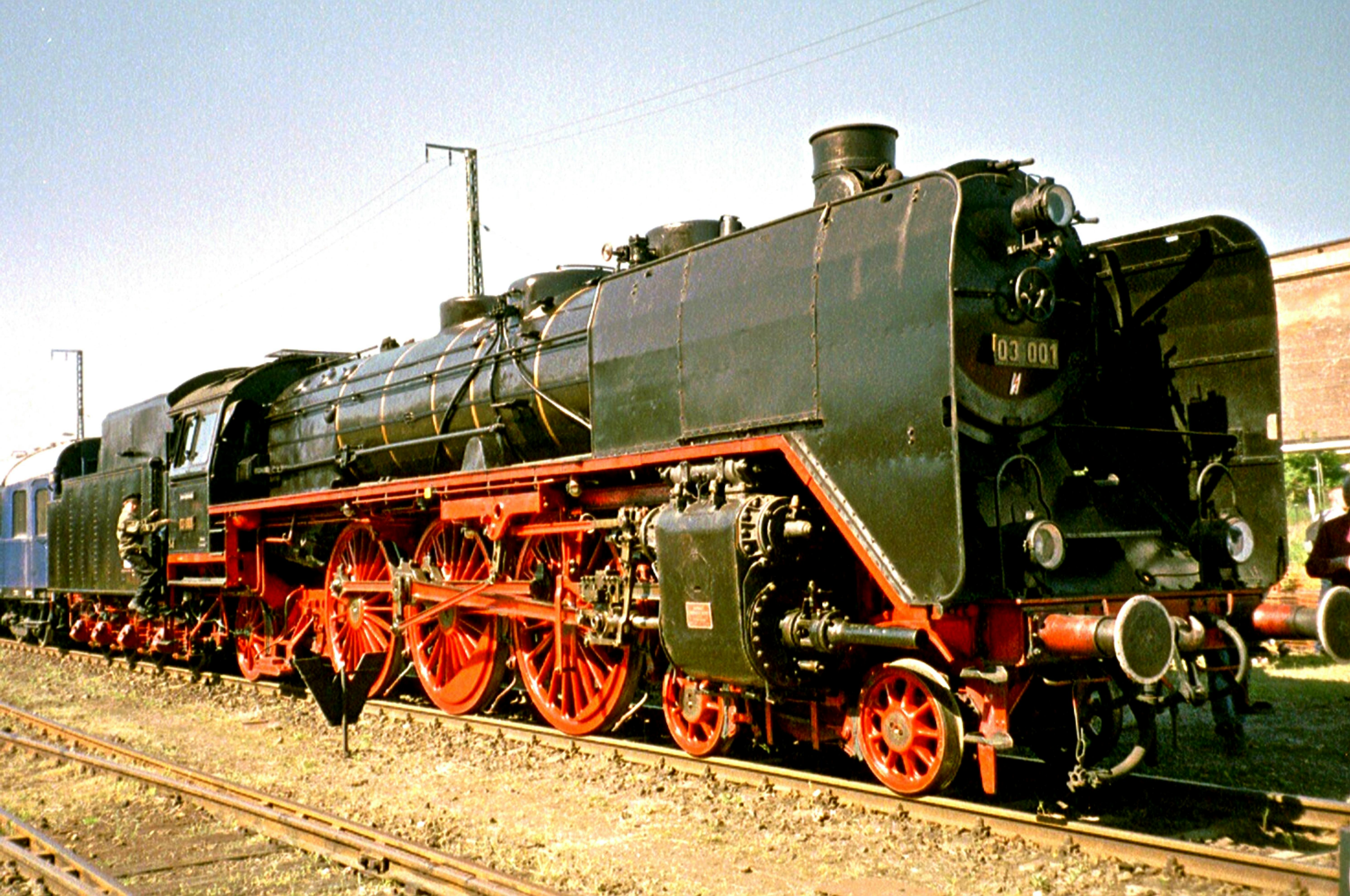
- 03 001 at the 2002 Dresden Steam Locomotive Festival
Type and origin
- Power type: Steam
- Builder: Borsig (116); Berliner Maschinenbau (64); Henschel & Sohn (66); Krupp (52)
- Build date: 1930–1937
- Total produced: 298
Specifications
- Configuration
  - Whyte: 4-6-2
  - UIC: 2′C1′ h2
  - German: 03 001–122: S 36.17; 03 123–298: S 36.18
- Gauge: 1,435 mm (4 ft 8 1/2 in)
- Leading dia.: 03 001–162: 850 mm (33 1/2 in); 03 163–298: 1,000 mm (39 3/8 in)
- Driver dia.: 2,000 mm (78 3/4 in)
- Trailing dia.: 1,250 mm (49 1/4 in)
- Tender wheels: 1,000 mm (39 3/8 in)
- Wheelbase
  - Axle spacing (Asymmetrical): 2,200 mm (7 ft 2 5/8 in) +; 1,800 mm (5 ft 10 7/8 in) +; 2,250 mm (7 ft 4 5/8 in) +; 2,250 mm (7 ft 4 5/8 in) +; 3,500 mm (11 ft 5 3/4 in)
  - Engine: 12,000 mm (39 ft 4 1/2 in)
  - Tender: 5,700 mm (18 ft 8 3/8 in)
  - Tender bogie: 1,900 mm (6 ft 2 3/4 in)
  - incl. tender: 20,225 mm (66 ft 4 1/4 in)
- Length
  - Over headstocks: 22,605 mm (74 ft 2 in)
  - Over buffers: 23,905 mm (78 ft 5 1/8 in)
- Height: 4,550 mm (14 ft 11 1/8 in)
- Axle load: 03 001–162: 17.7 tonnes (17.4 long tons; 19.5 short tons); 03 163–298: 18.1 tonnes (17.8 long tons; 20.0 short tons)
- Adhesive weight: 03 001–122: 53.0 tonnes (52.2 long tons; 58.4 short tons); 03 123–298: 54.3 tonnes (53.4 long tons; 59.9 short tons)
- Empty weight: 03 001–122: 90.4 tonnes (89.0 long tons; 99.6 short tons); 03 123–298: 91.0 tonnes (89.6 long tons; 100.3 short tons)
- Service weight: 03 001–122: 99.6 tonnes (98.0 long tons; 109.8 short tons); 03 123–298: 100.3 tonnes (98.7 long tons; 110.6 short tons)
- Tender type: 03 001–003: 2′2 T 30; 03 004–122: 2′2′ T 32; 03 123–298: 2′2′ T 34
- Fuel type: Coal
- Fuel capacity: 10 tonnes (9.8 long tons; 11 short tons)
- Water cap.: 30 or 32 or 34 m^{3} (1,100 or 1,100 or 1,200 cu ft)
- Firebox
  - Grate area: 03 001–162: 4.05 m^{2} (43.6 sq ft); 03 163–298: 4.09 m^{2} (44.0 sq ft)
- Boiler
  - Pitch: 3,100 mm (10 ft 2 in)
  - Tube plates: 6,800 mm (22 ft 3 3/4 in)
  - Small tubes: 03 001–162: 70 mm (2 3/4 in), 84 off; 03 163–298: 70 mm (2 3/4 in), 85 off
  - Large tubes: 171 mm (6 3/4 in), 20 off
- Boiler pressure: 16.0 bar (16.3 kgf/cm^{2}; 232 psi)
- Heating surface
  - Firebox: 16.10 m^{2} (173.3 sq ft)
  - Tubes: 116.50 or 117.88 m^{2} (1,254.0 or 1,268.8 sq ft)
  - Flues: 69.62 m^{2} (749.4 sq ft)
  - Total surface: 202.22 or 203.65 m^{2} (2,176.7 or 2,192.1 sq ft)
- Superheater
  - Heating area: 03 001–162: 70.0 m^{2} (753 sq ft); 03 163–298: 72.2 m^{2} (777 sq ft)
- Cylinders: Two, outside
- Cylinder size: 570 mm × 660 mm (22 7/16 in × 26 in) on 03 001-003 originally: 600 mm × 660 mm (23 5/8 in × 26 in)
- Valve gear: outside Walschaerts
- Train heating: Steam
- Loco brake: automatic, single-chamber Knorr compressed air brakes to 03 162 coupled and bogie wheels, one-sided, from 03 163 both sides of coupled wheels and one-sided on trailing wheels
Performance figures
- Maximum speed: 03 001–162: 120 km/h (75 mph); 03 163–298: 130 km/h (81 mph); Reverse: 50 km/h (31 mph)
- Indicated power: 1,970 PS (1,449 kW; 1,943 hp)
- Tractive effort: 161.8 kN (36,400 lbf)
Career
- Numbers: 03 001 – 03 298

The Class 03 steam engines were standard express train locomotives (Einheitslokomotiven) in service with the Deutsche Reichsbahn.

== History ==
The Class 03 engines were built between 1930 and 1938 as express train locomotives for routes that were only suitable for axle loads of up to 18 tonnes. 298 examples of this engine, whose construction was based on the Class 01, were built by the firms of Borsig, Krupp, Henschel, and Schwartzkopff.

Its reduced weight was achieved by the use of a light sectional frame, smaller boiler and smaller cylinders. From engine number 03 123 onwards the pumps were located in the centre of the locomotive and from number 03 163 the locos had larger leading wheels.

Locomotive number 03 154 was equipped with a parabolic smokebox door, a tapered driver's cab and driving gear cover plates. Number 03 193 was given a wine-red, streamlined, full covering and a 2′3 T 37 St tender, in order to replace the Class 05. 03 204 and 03 205 had driving gear cover plates for experimental purposes. Locomotive numbers 03 175 and 03 207 had Lentz valve gear, also as an experiment.

Until 1959, 145 Class 03 locomotives were in the Deutsche Bundesbahn's operating fleet, of which 62 engines (03 005 to 03 122) had air and feed pumps on the smokebox, small 850 mm (2 ft 9 in) leading wheels and a top speed of 120 km/h (75 mph), 16 machines (03 127 to 03 160) had air and feed pumps between the middle and rear driving wheels, and 67 engines (03 164 to 03 296) had air and feed pumps between the middle and rear driving wheels, scissor-block brakes (Scherenklotzbremsen), large 1,000 mm (3 ft 3 in) leading wheels and a 130 km/h (81 mph) top speed.

In 1968 there were still 45 units, now designated as Class 003, remaining in the operational fleet. They were stabled at the following locomotive sheds: two at the Braunschweig shed, six at Bremen Main Station, 13 at Hamburg-Altona, one at Husum, 16 in Mönchengladbach and seven at Ulm.

The last ten locomotives of Class 003 were on duty from 1971 at Ulm; in 1972 the last ones, nos. 003 088, 003 131 and 003 268, were withdrawn from service.

The DR in East Germany had 86 engines in its fleet. From 1962 they equipped their vehicles with mixer preheaters.

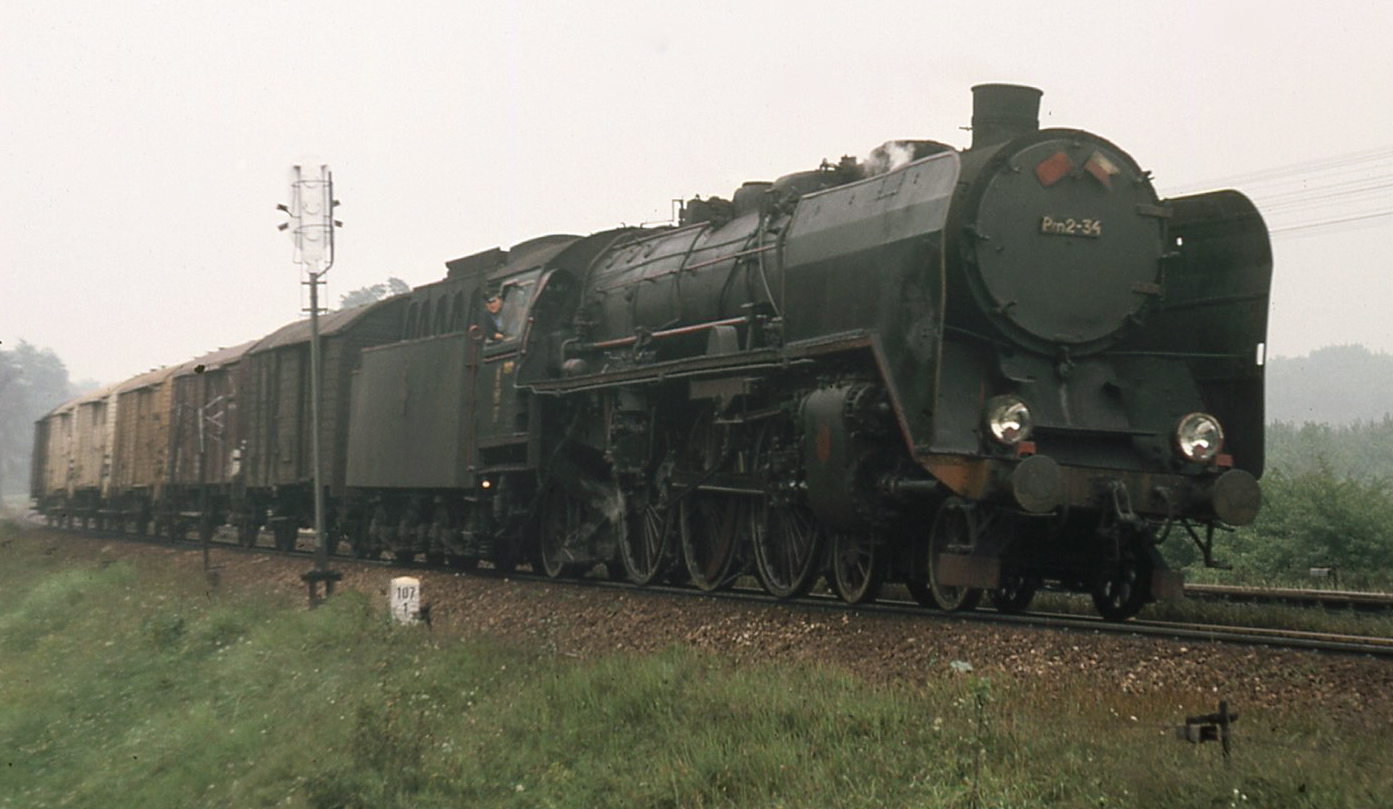
An 03 running in Poland as PKP No. Pm2-34, today preserved at Warsaw, near Toruń with a northbound freight; 1976

35 03 Pacifics went to Poland after World War 2, along with ten streamlined 03.10s. The Polish version of the Class 03, the Pm2 (running number 34), can be seen at the railway museum in Warsaw.

The locomotives of this class had 2′2 T 30, 2′2′ T 32 and 2′2′ T 34 tenders.

== See also ==
- List of DRG locomotives and railbuses
- DRB Class 03.10

== Literature ==
- Hütter, Ingo (2009). Die Dampflokomotiven der Baureihen 01 bis 45 der DRG, DRB, DB, und DR (in German). Werl: DGEG Medien. pp. 76–84. ISBN 978-3-937189-45-1.
- Maidment, David (2017). The German Pacific Locomotive: Its Design and Development. Locomotive Portfolios series. Barnsley, South Yorkshire, UK: Pen & Sword Transport. ISBN 9781473852495.
- Troche, Horst (2006). Die Baureihe 03 (in German). Freiburg: EK-Verlag. ISBN 978-3-88255-133-4.
- Nagel, Gustav (2002). "Baureihe 03. Im Führerstand". Lok Magazin (in German). 41 (248). München: GeraNova Zeitschriftenverlag GmbH: 52–55. ISSN 0458-1822.
- Rotthowe, Ludwig (2002). "Und keiner wollte sie haben... . Die 03.10 bei der DB". Lok Magazin (in German). 41 (252). München: GeraNova Zeitschriftenverlag GmbH: 54–61. ISSN 0458-1822.
- Vetter, Klaus J. (2001). Das große Handbuch deutscher Lokomotiven (in German). Bruckmanns Spezial Verlag. ISBN 3-7654-3764-6.
- Weisbrod, Manfred; Müller, Hans; Petznik, Wolfgang (1976). Dampflokomotiven deutscher Eisenbahnen, Baureihe 01–39 (EFA 1.1) (in German) (3rd ed.). Düsseldorf: Alba Buchverlag. pp. 39–45. ISBN 3-87094-081-6.
