= DRG Class 81 =

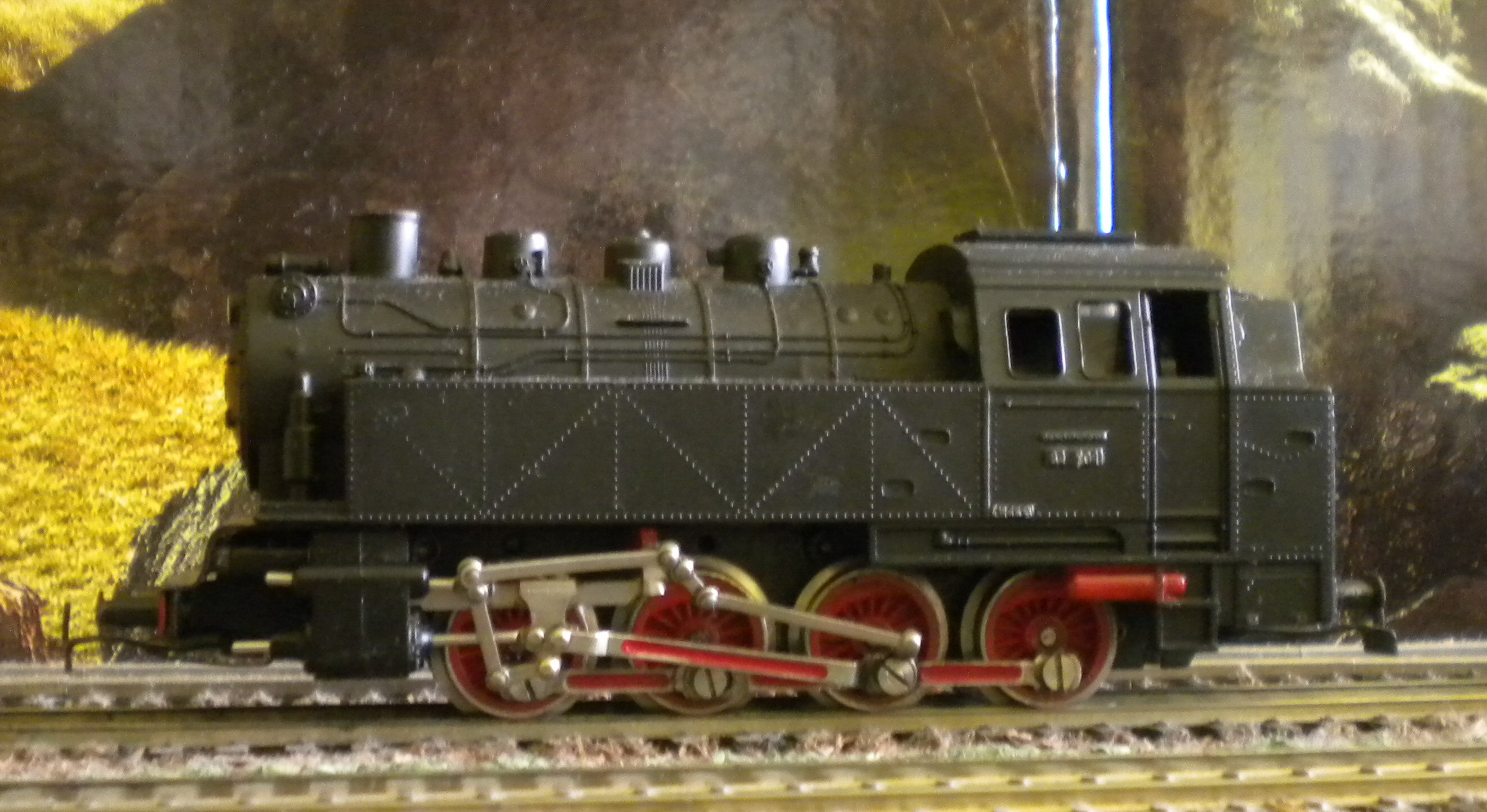
- Model of a Class 81
Type and origin
- Power type: Steam
- Builder: Hanomag
- Serial number: 10555…10564
- Build date: 1928
- Total produced: 10
Specifications
- Configuration
  - Whyte: 0-8-0T
  - UIC: D h2t
  - German: Gt 44.17
- Gauge: 1,435 mm (4 ft 8 1/2 in)
- Driver dia.: 1,100 mm (3 ft 7 1/4 in)
- Wheelbase
  - Axle spacing (Asymmetrical): 1,400 mm (4 ft 7 1/8 in) +; 1,400 mm (4 ft 7 1/8 in) +; 1,400 mm (4 ft 7 1/8 in) =
  - Engine: 4,200 mm (13 ft 9 3/8 in)
- Length
  - Over headstocks: 9,780 mm (32 ft 1 in)
  - Over buffers: 11,080 mm (36 ft 4 1/4 in)
- Height: 4,165 mm (13 ft 8 in)
- Axle load: 16.9 t (16.6 long tons; 18.6 short tons)
- Adhesive weight: 67.5 t (66.4 long tons; 74.4 short tons)
- Empty weight: 52.0 t (51.2 long tons; 57.3 short tons)
- Service weight: 67.5 t (66.4 long tons; 74.4 short tons)
- Fuel type: Coal
- Fuel capacity: 3.0 t (3.0 long tons; 3.3 short tons)
- Water cap.: 8 m^{3} (1,760 imp gal; 2,110 US gal)
- Firebox
  - Grate area: 1.78 m^{2} (19.2 sq ft)
- Boiler
  - Pitch: 2,700 mm (8 ft 10 1/4 in)
  - Tube plates: 3,500 mm (11 ft 5 3/4 in)
  - Small tubes: 44.5 mm (1 3/4 in), 114 off
  - Large tubes: 118 mm (4 5/8 in), 32 off
- Boiler pressure: 14 bar (14.3 kgf/cm^{2}; 203 psi)
- Heating surface
  - Firebox: 7.7 m^{2} (83 sq ft)
  - Tubes: 49.5 m^{2} (533 sq ft)
  - Flues: 38.7 m^{2} (417 sq ft)
  - Total surface: 95.9 m^{2} (1,032 sq ft)
- Superheater
  - Heating area: 34.0 m^{2} (366 sq ft)
- Cylinders: Two, outside
- Cylinder size: 500 mm × 550 mm (19 11/16 in × 21 5/8 in)
- Valve gear: Heusinger valve gear(Walschaerts)
- Valve type: Piston valve
- Loco brake: einlösige Knorr compressed-air brakes, K-GP mZ auxiliary brake
- Train brakes: Knorr brake
- Couplers: Buffers and chain coupler
Performance figures
- Maximum speed: 45 km/h (28 mph)
- Indicated power: 860 PS (633 kW; 848 hp)
Career
- Operators: Deutsche Reichsbahn
- Numbers: 81 001 – 81 010
- Retired: 1963

The locomotives of the German DRG Class 81 were standard (Einheitsdampflokomotiven) goods train tank locomotives with the Deutsche Reichsbahn-Gesellschaft (DRG).

In 1928, ten examples were delivered by the firm of Hanomag that matched the Class 80 locomotives in many details. The axles were all fixed rigidly to the frame, but the middle one had thinner wheel flanges. In contrast to the Class 80s, the Class 81 engines had a larger heating area and carried more coal and water. The delivery of 60 more vehicles was cancelled in 1940 due to the Second World War. The locomotives were mainly employed on heavy shunting duties. After their collection, the ten engines were allocated to the locomotive depots (Bahnbetriebswerken or Bw) of Goslar (81 001–005) and Oldenburg (81 006–010). In 1945 all the engines were in the Oldenburg area and went over to the Deutsche Bundesbahn. The last engine was taken out of service in October 1963. Number 81 005 was still working as an industrial loco in AW Nied after its retirement from the DB.

== Preserved locomotives ==
Number 81 004 is the only one of its type to have been preserved. After passing through several owners and locations, it has found a home with the Hessencourrier society, who intend to have it refurbished.

== See also ==
- List of DRG locomotives and railbuses
