= DRG Class 62 =

Class of German steam locomotives

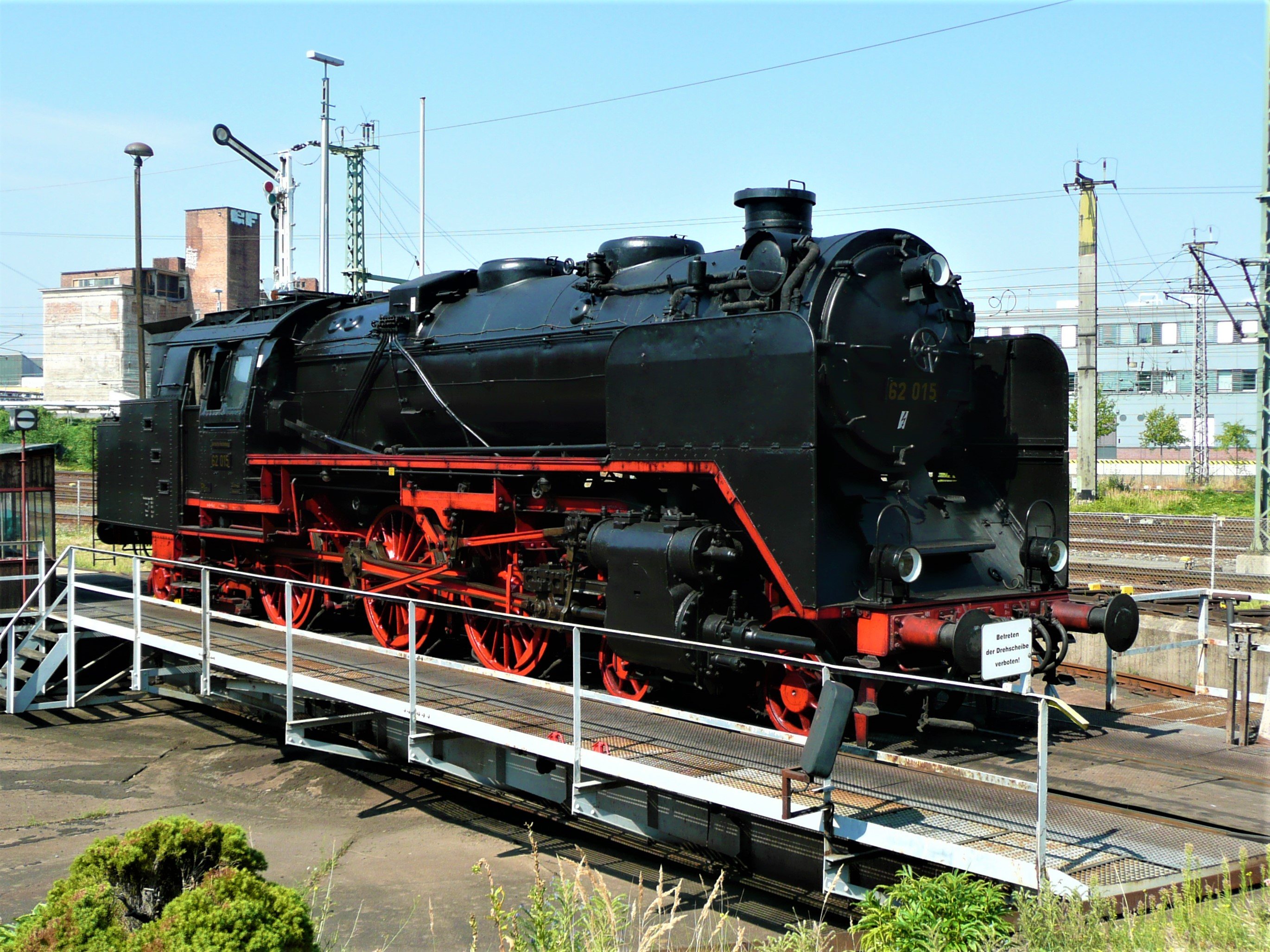
- 62 015 in Dresden Altstadt depot, August 2018
Type and origin
- Power type: Steam
- Builder: Henschel & Sohn
- Serial number: 20844–20858
- Build date: 1928–1929
- Total produced: 15
Specifications
- Configuration
  - Whyte: 4-6-4T
  - UIC: 2′C2′ h2t
  - German: Pt 37.20
- Gauge: 1,435 mm (4 ft 8 1/2 in)
- Leading dia.: 850 mm (2 ft 9 1/2 in)
- Driver dia.: 1,750 mm (5 ft 8 7/8 in)
- Trailing dia.: 850 mm (2 ft 9 1/2 in)
- Wheelbase
  - Axle spacing (Asymmetrical): 2,200 mm (7 ft 2 5/8 in) +; 1,950 mm (6 ft 4 3/4 in) +; 2,150 mm (7 ft 5/8 in) +; 2,850 mm (9 ft 4 1/4 in) +; 1,950 mm (6 ft 4 3/4 in) +; 2,200 mm (7 ft 2 5/8 in) =
  - Engine: 13,300 mm (43 ft 7 5/8 in)
- Length
  - Over headstocks: 15,840 mm (51 ft 11 5/8 in)
  - Over buffers: 17,140 mm (56 ft 2 3/4 in)
- Height: 4,550 mm (14 ft 11 1/8 in)
- Axle load: 20.2 t (19.9 long tons; 22.3 short tons)
- Adhesive weight: 60.8 t (59.8 long tons; 67.0 short tons)
- Empty weight: 97.9 t (96.4 long tons; 107.9 short tons)
- Service weight: 123.6 t (121.6 long tons; 136.2 short tons)
- Fuel type: Coal
- Fuel capacity: 4.3 t (4.2 long tons; 4.7 short tons)
- Water cap.: 14 m^{3} (3,080 imp gal; 3,700 US gal)
- Firebox
  - Grate area: 3.55 m^{2} (38.2 sq ft)
- Boiler
  - Pitch: 3,150 mm (10 ft 4 in)
  - Tube plates: 4,700 mm (15 ft 5 in)
  - Small tubes: 50 mm (1 15/16 in), 155 off
  - Large tubes: 133 mm (5 1/4 in), 41 off
- Boiler pressure: 14 bar (14.3 kgf/cm^{2}; 203 psi)
- Heating surface
  - Firebox: 15.0 m^{2} (161 sq ft)
  - Tubes: 105.28 m^{2} (1,133.2 sq ft)
  - Flues: 75.67 m^{2} (814.5 sq ft)
  - Total surface: 195.95 m^{2} (2,109.2 sq ft)
- Superheater
  - Heating area: 72.50 m^{2} (780.4 sq ft)
- Cylinders: Two, outside
- Cylinder size: 600 mm × 660 mm (23 5/8 in × 26 in)
- Valve gear: outside Heusinger (Walschaerts) with Kuhn slide
- Train heating: Steam
Performance figures
- Maximum speed: 100 km/h (62 mph)
- Indicated power: 1,680 PS (1,240 kW; 1,660 hp)
Career
- Numbers: 62 001 – 62 015
- Retired: 1973

The Class 62 engines were standard (see Einheitsdampflokomotiven) passenger train tank locomotives of Germany's Deutsche Reichsbahn-Gesellschaft (DRG).

The Class 62s were developed and delivered by the firm of Henschel for the Reichsbahn during the 1920s. The engines were two-cylinder superheated steam locomotives. Fifteen units were manufactured. Although the engines were built as early as 1928, the Deutsche Reichsbahn did not take over numbers 62 003–015 until 1932. This was due to the low priority for such engines in the Reichsbahn, as well as the high cost. During the 1930s they were stationed at the locomotive depots (Bahnbetriebswerke or Bw) of Düsseldorf marshalling yard, Sassnitz on the island of Rügen and Meiningen. After the Second World War eight examples were left in the hands of the DR in East Germany and seven with the Deutsche Bundesbahn.

Up to 1967, engines in GDR were distributed around various depots including, for example, Meiningen, Berlin Ostbahnhof and Rostock. The engines also spent a short while in Wittenberge and Berlin-Lichtenberg depots. Number 62 007 was stationed from 8 April to 6 May 1967 in Schwerin, but was only stored there. In 1968 they were assembled at Frankfurt (Oder) shed. There the engines hauled trains on the Frankfurt (Oder)-Erkner route. At the beginning of 1970 only numbers 62 007, 62 014 and 62 015 were still in operation, in the Est Wriezen where they headed trains to Berlin-Lichtenberg. Number 62 007 was retired there in 1972, the last engine in schedule services, but continued to be used as a heating engine until 1973. The only surviving locomotive, no. 62 015, is today owned by the DB (Nuremberg Transport Museum) and is housed in the locomotive shed of the former Dresden-Altstadt depot. Until 1997 the engine was used to haul nostalgia trains.

Immediately after the war, after they had been sent to Wuppertal, the Deutsche Bundesbahn housed its vehicles at Dortmund, Düsseldorf, Essen, and Krefeld. By 1956 the DB's Class 62s had been taken out of service. The last engine, 62 003, was retired in 1968 in Schwerte, after it had served as an instructional model from 1956 to 1966 in the engine driver school in Troisdorf.

== See also ==
- List of DRG locomotives and railbuses

== Literature ==
- Endisch, Dirk (2002). Baureihe 62. Stuttgart: Transpress Verlag. ISBN 3-613-71199-0.
- Thomas Frister; Hansjürgen Wenzel (ed.): Lokporträt Baureihe 62 Eisenbahn-Bildarchiv – Vol. 41. EK-Verlag, Freiburg 2009, ISBN 978-3-88255-380-2
- Alfred B. Gottwaldt, ed. (1982), "Bilder aus der Geschichte der Baureihe 62", Lok-Magazin (in German), no. 116, Stuttgart: Franckh’sche Verlagshandlung, W. Keller & Co., pp. 362–368, ISSN 0458-1822
- Hütter, Ingo (2021). Die Dampflokomotiven der Baureihen 60 bis 91 der DRG, DRB, DB, und DR (in German). Werl: DGEG Medien. pp. 15–17. ISBN 978-3-946594-21-5.
- Oliver Strüber (2019), Rudolf Heym (ed.), "Die Außergewöhnliche Baureihe 62 im Porträt", Lok-Magazin (in German), no. 1/2020, Munich: GeraMond Verlag, pp. 92–103, ISSN 0458-1822
- Weisbrod, Manfred; Müller, Hans; Petznik, Wolfgang (1978). Dampflokomotiven deutscher Eisenbahnen, Baureihe 60–96 (EFA 1.3) (in German) (4th ed.). Düsseldorf: Alba. pp. 17–20, 227. ISBN 3-87094-083-2.
