= DRG Class 44 =

German steam locomotive class

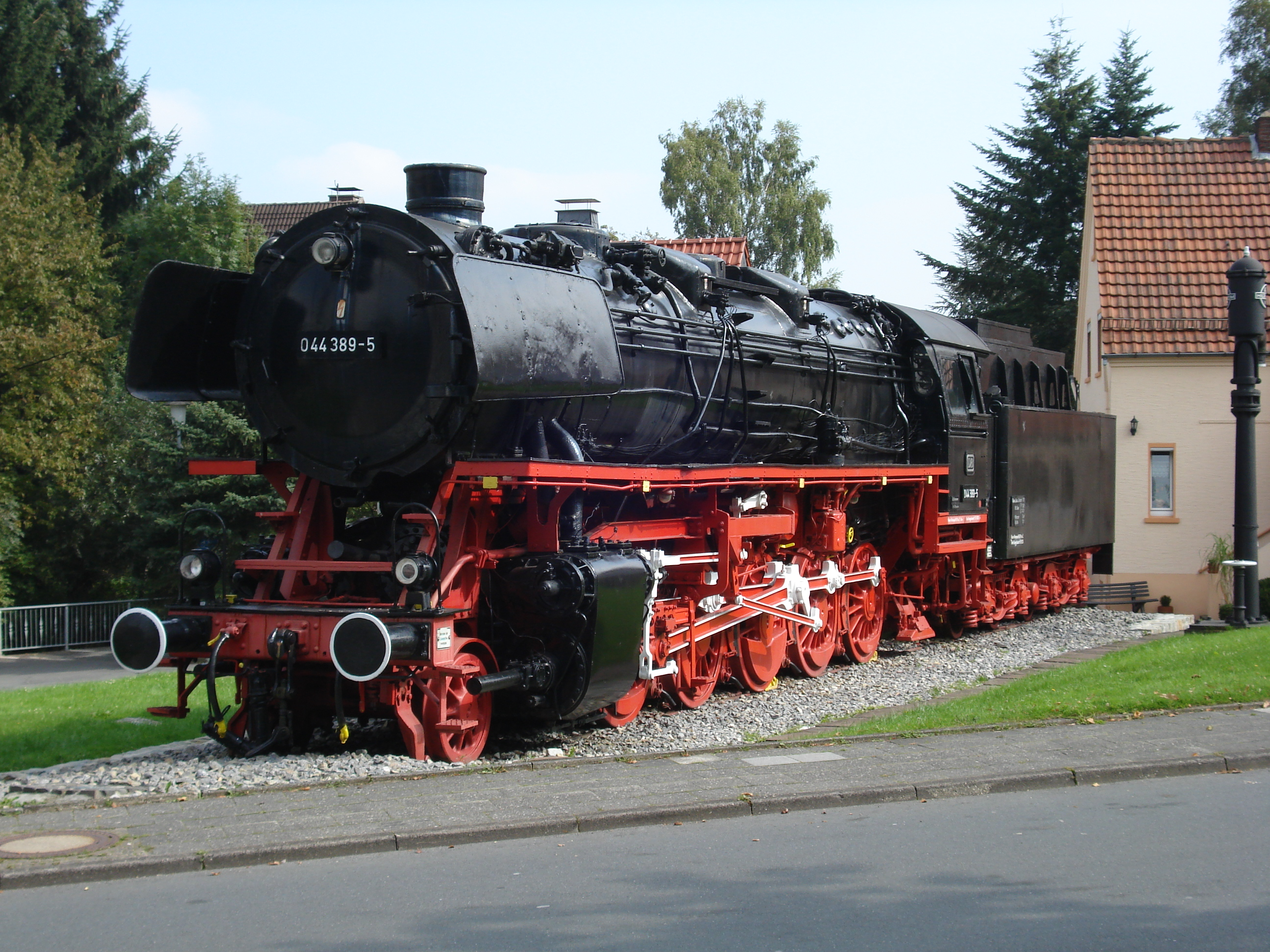
- 044 389-5 as a monument in Altenbeken
Type and origin
- Power type: Steam
- Builder: Henschel & Sohn (173); Berliner Maschinenbau (60); Borsig (170); Maschinenfabrik Esslingen (16); Lokomotivfabrik Floridsdorf (105); Krauss-Maffei (80); Krupp (309); Schichau-Werke (126); Fablok (145); Frichs (10); Schneider et Cie (140); Fives-Lille (184); Batignolles-Châtillon (134); SFCM (176); SACM (59)
- Build date: 1926–1946
- Total produced: 1,989
Specifications
- Configuration
  - Whyte: 2-10-0
  - UIC: 1′E h3
  - German: G 56.20
- Driver: Divided: inner on 2nd coupled axle, outer on 3rd
- Gauge: 1,435 mm (4 ft 8 1/2 in)
- Leading dia.: 850 mm (33 1/2 in)
- Driver dia.: 1,400 mm (55 1/8 in)
- Wheelbase
  - Axle spacing (Asymmetrical): 2,850 mm (9 ft 4 1/4 in) +; 1,700 mm (5 ft 6 7/8 in) +; 1,700 mm (5 ft 6 7/8 in) +; 1,700 mm (5 ft 6 7/8 in) +; 1,700 mm (5 ft 6 7/8 in) =
  - Engine: 9,650 mm (31 ft 7 7/8 in)
  - Tender: 1,900 mm (6 ft 2 3/4 in) +; 1,900 mm (6 ft 2 3/4 in) +; 1,900 mm (6 ft 2 3/4 in) =; 5,700 mm (18 ft 8 3/8 in)
  - incl. tender: 19,190 mm (62 ft 11 1/2 in)
- Length
  - Over buffers: 22,620 mm (74 ft 2 1/2 in)
- Height: 4,550 mm (14 ft 11 1/8 in)
- Axle load: 19.0 t (18.7 long tons; 20.9 short tons)
- Adhesive weight: 95.0 t (93.5 long tons; 104.7 short tons)
- Empty weight: 99.9 t (98.3 long tons; 110.1 short tons)
- Service weight: 109.8 t (108.1 long tons; 121.0 short tons)
- Tender type: 2′2′ T 32/34, a few with tub tenders
- Fuel type: Coal
- Fuel capacity: 10.0 t (9.8 long tons; 11.0 short tons)
- Water cap.: 32.0 or 34.0 m^{3} (7,000 or 7,500 imp gal; 8,500 or 9,000 US gal)
- Firebox
  - Grate area: 44 001–44 065: 4.7 m^{2} (51 sq ft); Remainder: 4.55 m^{2} (49.0 sq ft)
- Boiler
  - Tube plates: 5,800 mm (19 ft 3/8 in)
  - Small tubes: 54 mm (2 1/8 in), 128 off
  - Large tubes: 143 mm (5 5/8 in), 43 off
- Boiler pressure: 44 001–44 010: 14 bar (14.3 kgf/cm^{2}; 203 psi); Remainder: 16 bar (16.3 kgf/cm^{2}; 232 psi)
- Heating surface
  - Firebox: 18.0 m^{2} (194 sq ft)
  - Tubes: 114.0 m^{2} (1,227 sq ft)
  - Flues: 106.0 m^{2} (1,141 sq ft)
  - Total surface: 238.0 m^{2} (2,562 sq ft)
- Superheater
  - Heating area: 100.0 m^{2} (1,076 sq ft)
- Cylinders: Three
- Cylinder size: 44 001–44 010: 600 mm × 660 mm (23 5/8 in × 26 in); Remainder: 550 mm × 660 mm (21 5/8 in × 26 in)
- Valve gear: Heusinger (Walschaerts)
- Valve type: Piston Valve
- Train heating: Steam
- Loco brake: automatic, single-chamber Knorr compressed-air brakes
- Train brakes: Knorr brake
- Safety systems: None
- Couplers: Screw Links
Performance figures
- Maximum speed: Forward: 70 or 80 km/h (43 or 50 mph); Reverse: 50 km/h (31 mph)
- Indicated power: Coal: 1,910 PS (1,400 kW; 1,880 hp); Oil: 2,100 PS (1,540 kW; 2,070 hp)
Career
- Numbers: DRG: 44 001 ... 44 2025

The Class 44 (German: Baureihe 44 or BR 44) was a ten-coupled, heavy goods train steam locomotive built for the Deutsche Reichsbahn as a standard steam engine class (Einheitsdampflokomotive). Its sub-class was G 56.20 and it had triple cylinders. It was intended for hauling goods trains of up to 1,200 tonnes (1,200 long tons; 1,300 short tons) on the routes through Germany's hilly regions (Mittelgebirge) and up to 600 tonnes (590 long tons; 660 short tons) on steep inclines. They were numbered 44 001-44 1989.

== History ==
The first 10 examples were built in 1926. These engines had a somewhat higher steam consumption than the first ten units of the DRG Class 43 procured in parallel for comparison purposes, and which were equipped with two cylinders. Not until 1937 were further 44s procured, because by then the rising demands of rail transportation could be better met with a triple-cylinder configuration.

From 1926 to 1949, a total of 1,989 locomotives were manufactured. During the Second World War an austerity variant was built with simplified construction and delivery, known as the Class 44ÜK (one of the so-called Übergangskriegslokomotive). This primarily used home-produced materials; components were simplified, both in manufacturing methods and design, or left out completely. The most striking features of the ÜK locomotives were the omission of the smoke deflectors (that from 44 013 was standard) and also the forward side windows of the driver's cab.

After the war, Class 44 locomotives remained with the following railway administrations:

- DB (from 09/1949): 1,242 units
- DR (East Germany): 335 units
- PKP: 67 units (classified as Ty4)
- ČSD: 3 units
- ÖBB: 11 units, plus 5 units claimed by the Soviet Union as war booty
- SNCF: 14 units (classified as Class 150 X along with the 226 units built on assembly lines in French factories)
- SNCB: 1 unit, traded back to West Germany in 1950 but sent to France in 1952
- Fate unknown: 74 (one locomotive had been retired in 1944).

The Austrian Federal Railways (ÖBB) gave 9 engines back to the Deutsche Bundesbahn (DB) in 1952.

The DB transferred at least 291 engines to the French railways SNCF as reparations. These were predominantly locomotives that had been built in France, most of them never ran and were sold for scrap. The SNCF sold on 48 engines in 1955 to the Turkish State Railways (TCDD).

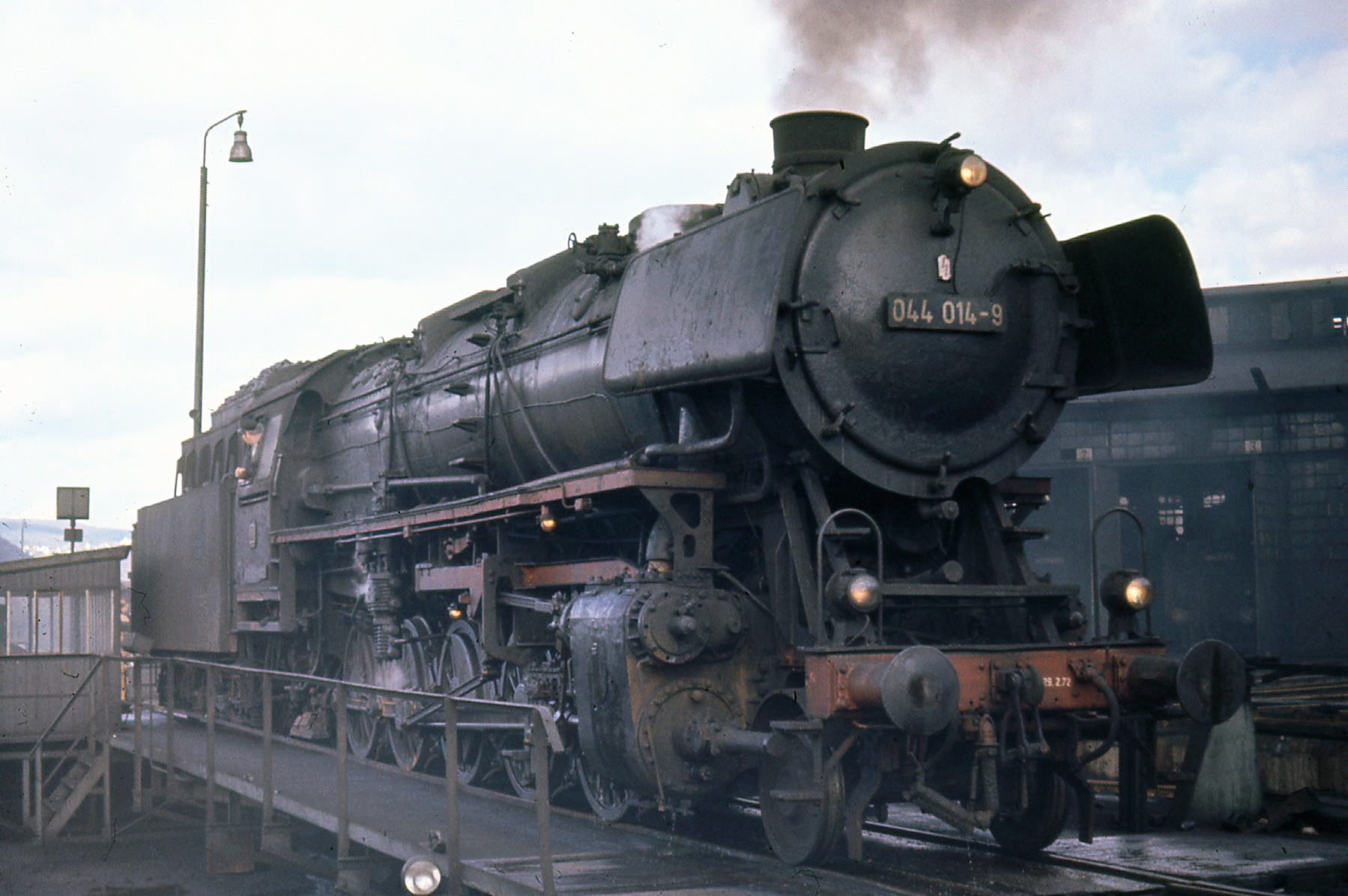
DB 044 014–9 on the turntable at Trier, Easter 1972

Until their replacement by modern diesel and electric locomotives, the Class 44 engines were the backbone of heavy goods train duties in Germany.

German railwaymen nicknamed the Class 44 locomotive the "Jumbo" because of its power. Only the rebuilt (Reko) locomotives of East Germany's Class 58.30, converted between 1958 and 1962, attained the performance of the Class 44s, at least on the plains.

== Construction ==
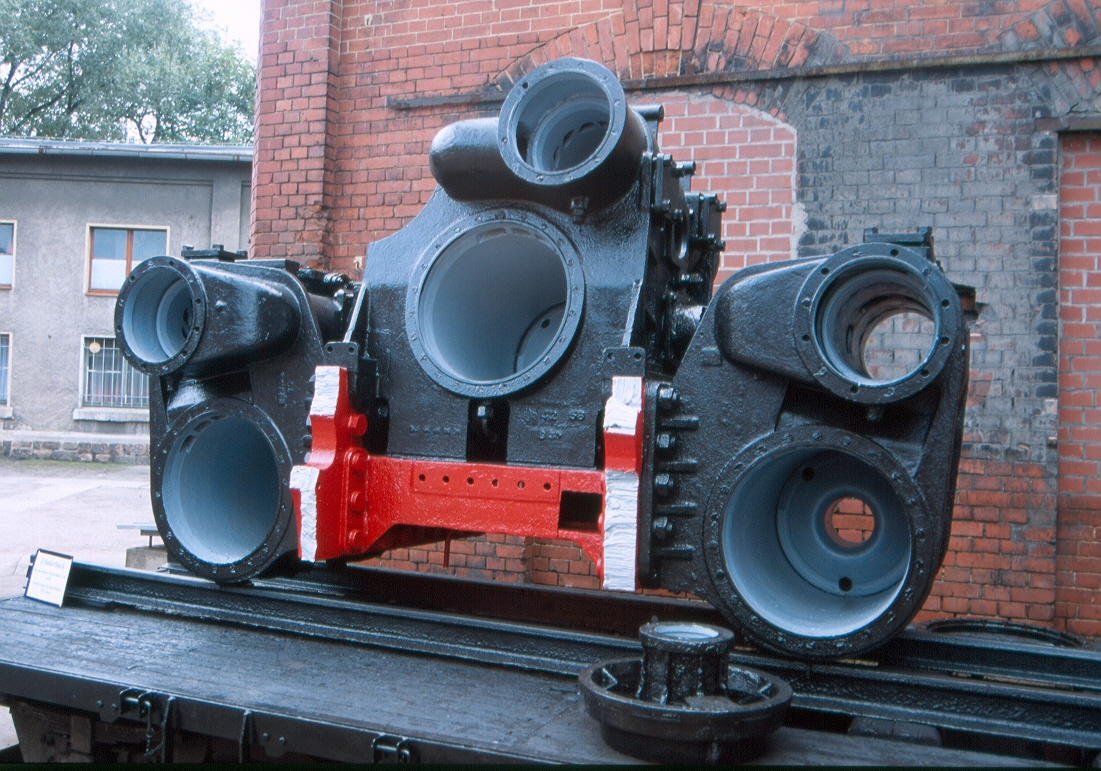
A Class 44 cylinder and section of locomotive frame

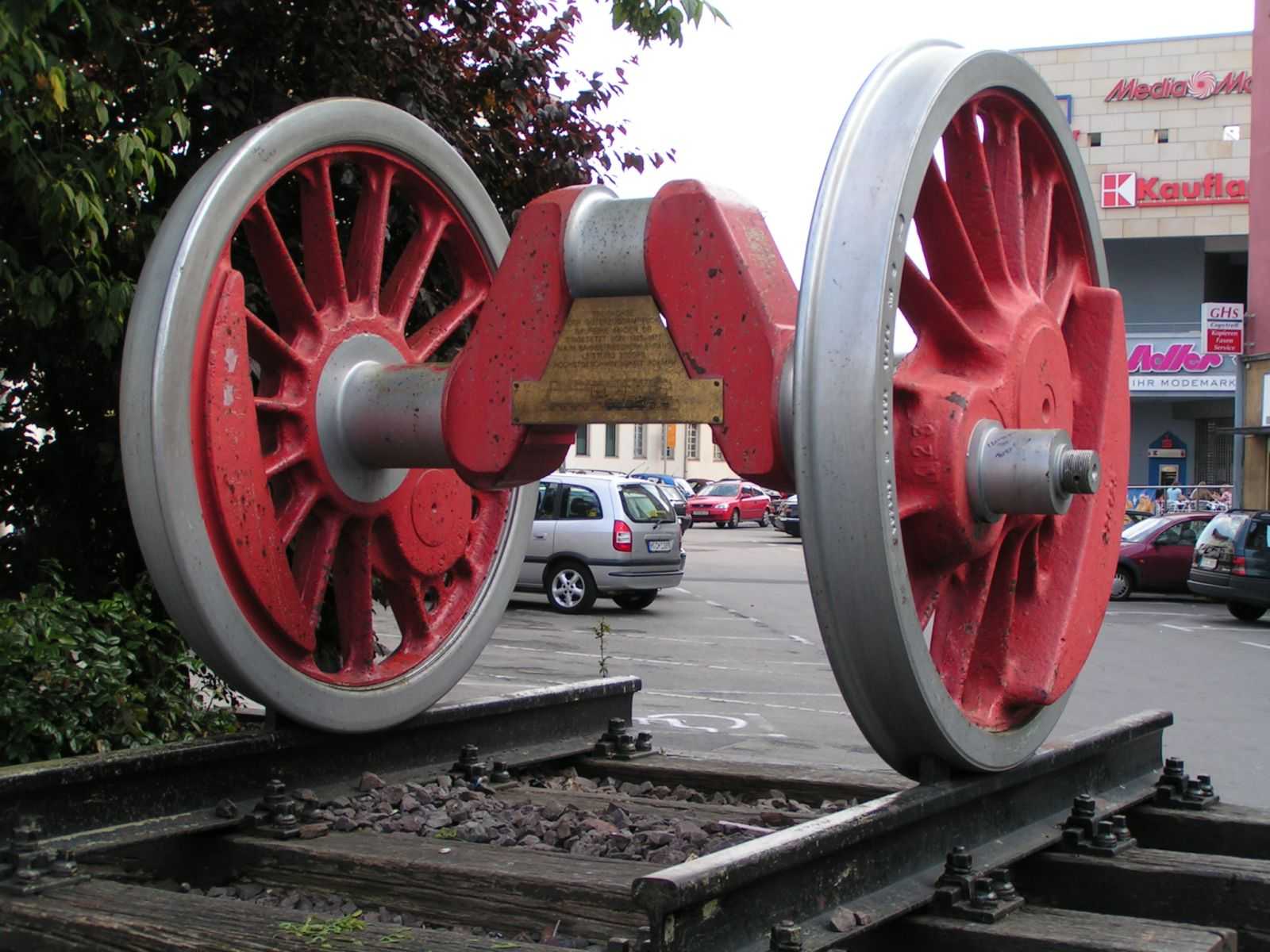
No. 2 driving axle of a Class 44

The top speed of the standard variant was 80 km/h, the prototypes (44 001 to 44 010) were permitted to run at 70 km/h. The engine is designed as a 3-cylinder locomotive with one cylinder located in the middle. The outside cylinders drive the third axle, the inside one drives the second.

Standard 2′2′ T 32 and 2′2′ T 34 tenders were used. Both types held 10 tonnes of coal.

== Variants ==
The Class 44 used a lot of steam and correspondingly large amounts of coal. In order to simplify the work and hold its power steady, 32 locomotives were converted to oil-firing by the DB in 1958 and 91 by the DR in 1963. With oil firing, the viscous fuel oil, almost solid when cold, is liquefied by a jet of steam, atomised and then combusted. The job of the stoker consists of starting the burner, greasing and pumping.

The DB's oil-fired locomotives ran under the classification 043 in the new EDP-generated numbering scheme of 1968 until they were retired. These numbers were spare because all DRG Class 43 engines belonged to the DR's fleet. The engines with grate firing were given the designation 044. The DR converted 20 locomotives to Wendler coal dust firing. These proved themselves well on the ramps of the Thuringian Forest with their precise firing. However no more locomotives were converted, as oil-firing was generally favoured because it enabled unrestricted operations.

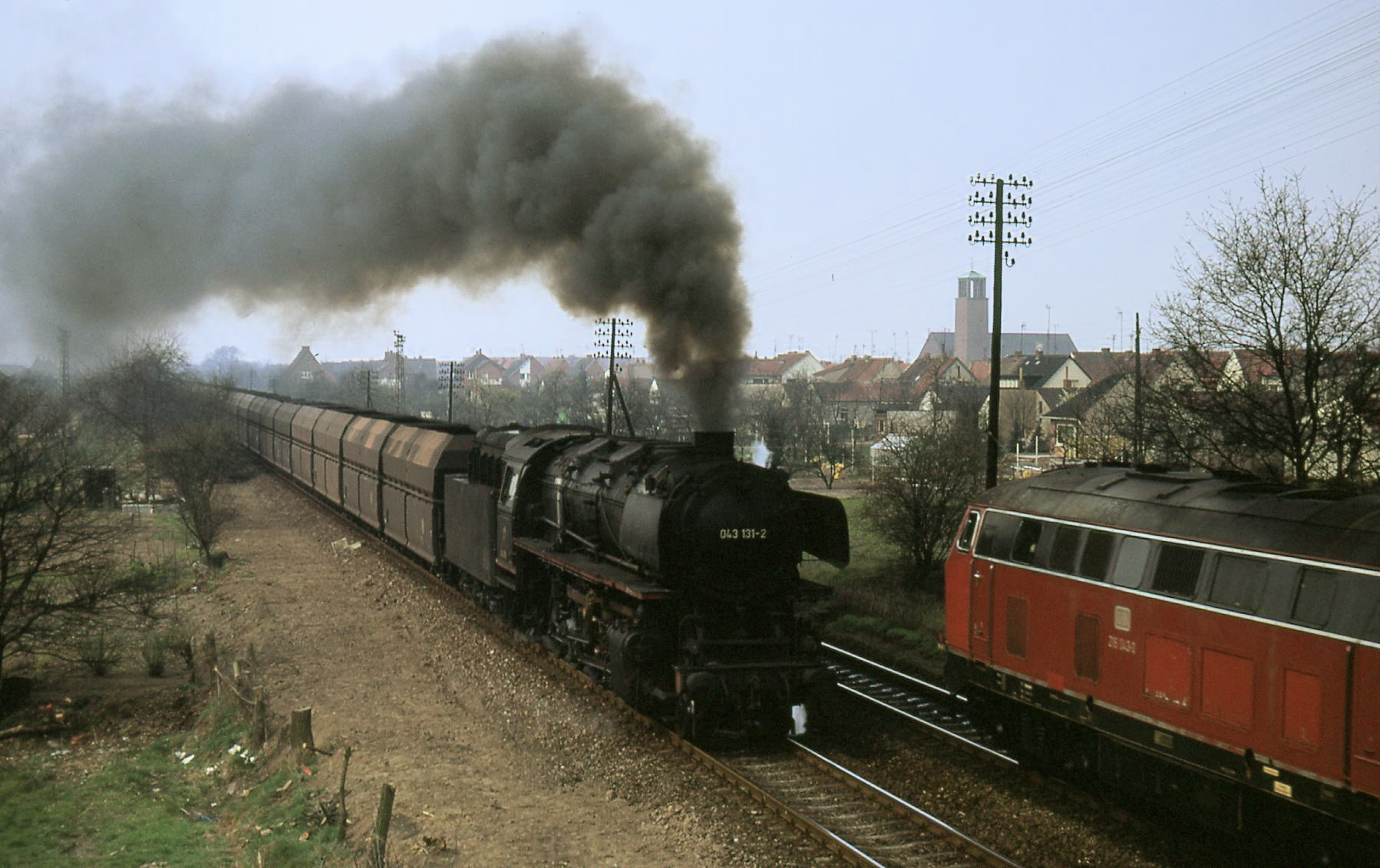
Oil-fired 043 (044) class enters Rheine from the north, Easter 1974

Following the 1973 oil crisis, all oil-fired engines in the DR were reconverted to coal-firing, because they were indispensable for operations. They were given the old operating numbers that they had previously carried prior to their modification to oil-firing. In the DB, they were not reconverted because they were soon due for retirement. The last coal-fired Class 44 locomotive with the DB was taken out of service in 1977 at the Gelsenkirchen-Bismarck shed. On its final journey, number 043 903-4 hauled train 81453 (consisting of a breakdown train equipment wagon) from Oldersum to Emden on 26 October 1977 for the Neubauamt Nord. It was the last scheduled steam service on the Deutsche Bundesbahn.

== Preserved Locomotives ==
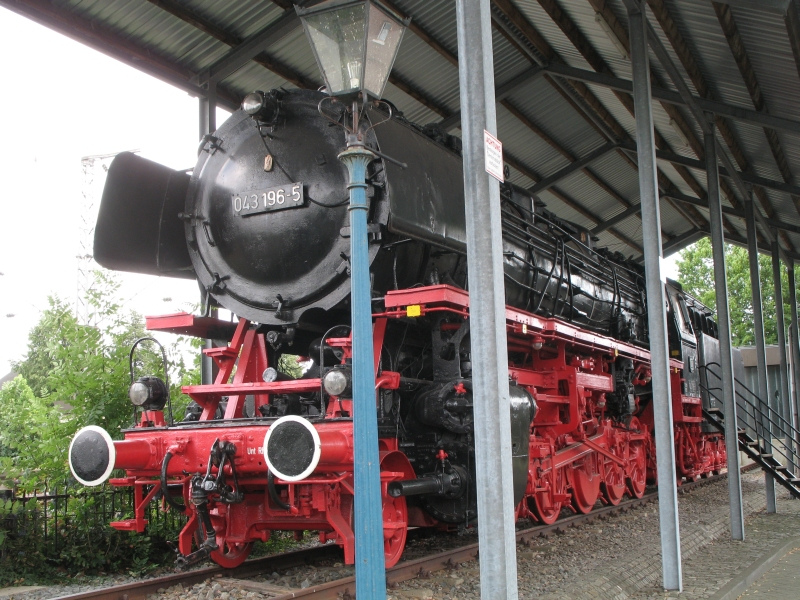
043 196–5 as a museum loco in Salzbergen

At present there are still two working "44s" in the world. At the 'traditional locomotive shed' at Stassfurt (Traditionsbetriebswerk Staßfurt), stands number 44 1486, the only current representative of her class in Germany. In addition, number 44 1593 remains operational with the Veluwsche Stoomtrein Maatschappij (VSM) in Beekbergen, Netherlands.

The following non-working Class 44s can be visited in various German railway museums:

- 44 1093, owned by the DB Museum, in Arnstadt shed
- 44 1338, the former heating engine, in the Saxon Railway Museum (Sächsisches Eisenbahnmuseum) at Chemnitz-Hilbersdorf
- 44 404 (see section on Trial Locomotives) in the Darmstadt-Kranichstein Railway Museum
- 44 1558 in Gelsenkirchen-Bismarck
- 44 508 in the former satellite shed at Westerburg (Westerwald)

Monuments include:

- 043 903 remains preserved as a monument on the railway forecourt in Emden
- 044 389–5 as a monument in Altenbeken.

Details of other locomotives are given in the list of preserved steam locomotives in Germany.

== Trial Locomotives ==
DRG Class 44 (medium pressure)
Type and origin
- Power type: Steam
- Builder: Henschel & Sohn
- Serial number: 22000, 22100
- Build date: 1932–1933
- Total produced: 2
Specifications
- Configuration
  - Whyte: 2-10-0
  - UIC: 1′E h4v
  - German: G 56.20
- Driver: Divided: inner on 2nd coupled axle, outer on 3rd
- Gauge: 1,435 mm (4 ft 8 1/2 in)
- Leading dia.: 1,000 mm (3 ft 3 3/8 in)
- Driver dia.: 1,400 mm (4 ft 7 1/8 in)
- Wheelbase
  - Engine: 9,650 mm (31 ft 8 in)
  - incl. tender: 19,180 mm (62 ft 11 in)
- Length
  - Over headstocks: 21,355 mm (70 ft 3/4 in)
  - Over buffers: 22,655 mm (74 ft 4 in)
- Axle load: 20.0 t (19.7 long tons; 22.0 short tons)
- Adhesive weight: 100.0 t (98.4 long tons; 110.2 short tons)
- Empty weight: 105.2 t (103.5 long tons; 116.0 short tons)
- Service weight: 114.9 t (113.1 long tons; 126.7 short tons)
- Tender type: 2′2′ T 32
- Firebox
  - Grate area: 4.7 m^{2} (51 sq ft)
- Boiler
  - Pitch: 3,100 mm (10 ft 2 in)
  - Tube plates: 5,800 mm (19 ft 3/8 in)
  - Small tubes: 60 mm (2 3/8 in), 83 off
  - Large tubes: 152 mm (6 in), 46 off
- Boiler pressure: 25 or 20 or 16 bar (25.5 or 20.4 or 16.3 kgf/cm^{2}; 363 or 290 or 232 lbf/in^{2})
- Heating surface
  - Firebox: 17.4 m^{2} (187 sq ft)
  - Tubes: 83.0 m^{2} (893 sq ft)
  - Flues: 120.0 m^{2} (1,292 sq ft)
  - Total surface: 220.4 m^{2} (2,372 sq ft)
- Superheater
  - Heating area: 113.00 m^{2} (1,216.3 sq ft)
- Cylinders: Four, compound: 2 HP inside, 2 LP outside
- High-pressure cylinder: 440 mm × 660 mm (17 5/16 in × 26 in)
- Low-pressure cylinder: 700 mm × 660 mm (27 9/16 in × 26 in)
Performance figures
- Maximum speed: 80 km/h (50 mph)
- Indicated power: 2,540 PS (1,870 kW; 2,510 hp)
Career
- Numbers: DRG 44 011 – 44 012
- Only changes from standard version shown

In 1932 and 1933 the firm of Henschel built two trial locomotives designed for a raised boiler overpressure of 25 bars (25.5 kgf/cm^{2}; 363 psi) and equipped with four-cylinder compounding, which were also incorporated into Class 44. The two engines, which initially ran under the numbers M 01 1004 and M 01 1005, and later as 44 011 and 44 012, were certainly very powerful, but also high-maintenance. As a result, the initial boiler pressure of 25 bar was reduced to 20 bars (20.4 kgf/cm^{2}; 290 psi) in 1935 and again to 16 bars (16.3 kgf/cm^{2}; 232 psi) in 1939.

After the Second World War, number 44 011 went to the Deutsche Bundesbahn and 44 012 to the DR. The DB engine, being a one-off, was retired as early as 1950. Number 44 012 was operated by the FVA Halle as a braking locomotive and not retired until 1962.

In 1975, the repair shop at Brunswick fitted a Riggenbach counter-pressure brake to 44 404. The Bundesbahn Federal Railway Office in Minden used this engine as a braking engine to test new electric locomotives. In 1977 it was retired. It stands today in the Darmstadt-Kranichstein Railway Museum.

== See also ==
- List of DRG locomotives and railbuses
