= DRG Class 01 =

Class of 241 German 4-6-2 locomotives (1926–1982)

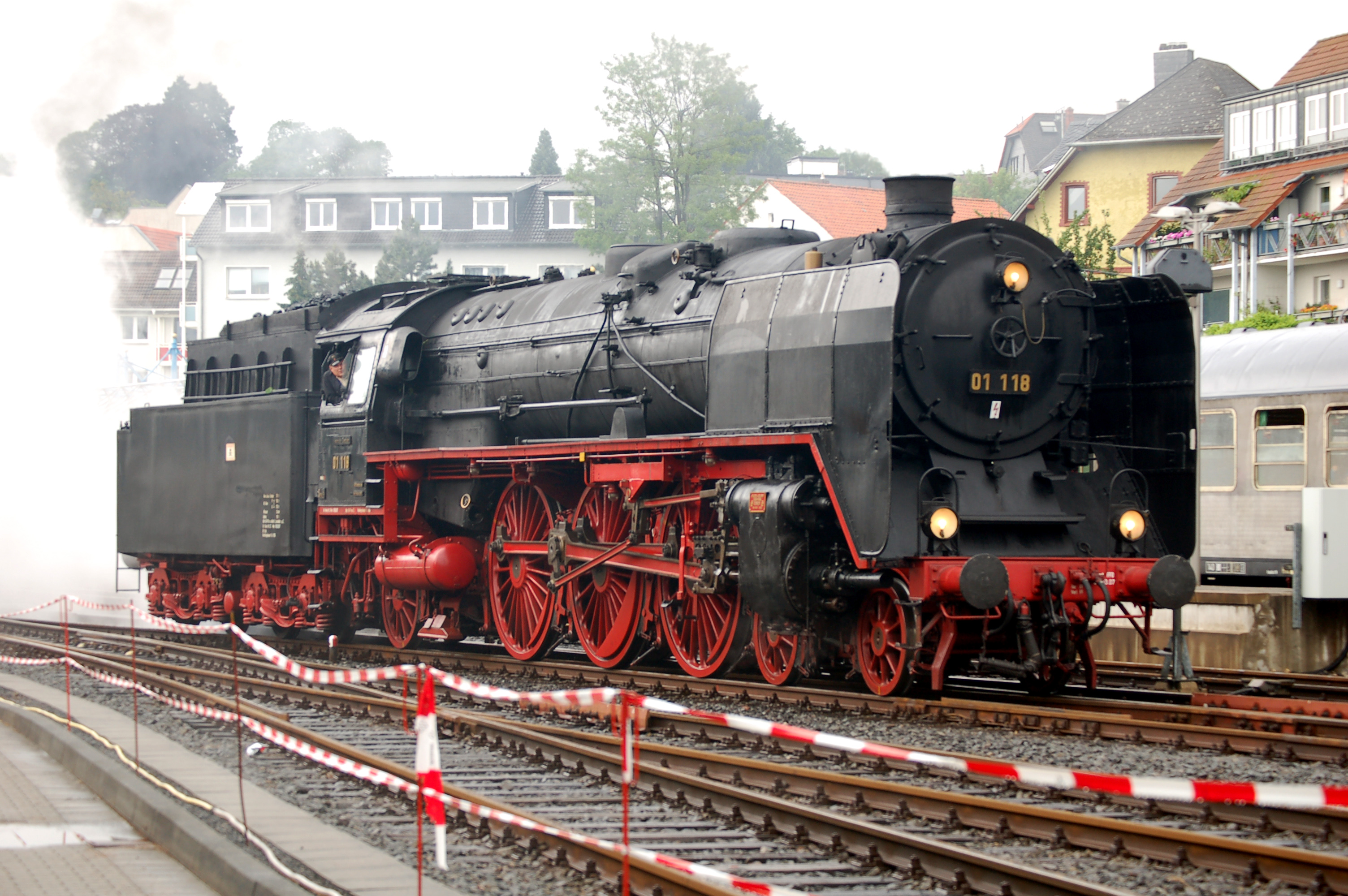
- 01 118 at Bahnhofsfest Königstein Pfingsten 2007
Type and origin
- Power type: Steam
- Builder: AEG (12), Berliner Maschinenbau (29), Borsig (18), Henschel & Sohn (122), Hohenzollern (12), Krupp (38)
- Build date: 1926–1938
- Total produced: 231 + 10 former Class 02s
Specifications
- Configuration
  - Whyte: 4-6-2
  - UIC: 2′C1′ h2
  - German: S 36.20
- Driver: Second coupled axle
- Gauge: 1,435 mm (4 ft 8 1/2 in)
- Leading dia.: 01 001–101, 233–242: 850 mm (33 1/2 in); 01 102–232: 1,000 mm (39 3/8 in)
- Driver dia.: 2,000 mm (78 3/4 in)
- Trailing dia.: 1,250 mm (49 1/4 in)
- Wheelbase
  - Axle spacing (Asymmetrical): 2,200 mm (7 ft 2 5/8 in) +; 1,800 mm (5 ft 10 7/8 in) +; 2,300 mm (7 ft 6 1/2 in) +; 2,300 mm (7 ft 6 1/2 in) +; 3,800 mm (12 ft 5 5/8 in)=
  - Engine: 12,400 mm (40 ft 8 1/4 in)
  - incl. tender: 20,320 mm (66 ft 8 in)
- Length
  - Over headstocks: 22,640 mm (74 ft 3 3/8 in)
  - Over buffers: 23,940 mm (78 ft 6 1/2 in)
- Height: 4,550 mm (14 ft 11 1/8 in)
- Axle load: 19.73–20.1 tonnes (19.42–19.78 long tons; 21.75–22.16 short tons)
- Adhesive weight: 59.2–60.2 tonnes (58.3–59.2 long tons; 65.3–66.4 short tons)
- Empty weight: 99.2–100.1 tonnes (97.6–98.5 long tons; 109.3–110.3 short tons)
- Service weight: 108.9–111.3 tonnes (107.2–109.5 long tons; 120.0–122.7 short tons)
- Tender type: 2′2′T 30/32/34
- Fuel type: Hard coal
- Fuel capacity: 10 tonnes (9.8 long tons; 11 short tons)
- Water cap.: 30 or 32 or 34 m^{3} (6,600 or 7,000 or 7,500 imp gal; 7,900 or 8,500 or 9,000 US gal)
- Firebox
  - Grate area: 01 001–149, 233–242: 4.41 m^{2} (47.5 sq ft); 01 150–232: 4.32 m^{2} (46.5 sq ft)
- Boiler
  - Pitch: 3,100 mm (10 ft 2 in)
  - Tube plates: 01 001–076: 5,800 mm (19 ft 3/8 in); 01 077–232: 6,800 mm (22 ft 3 11/16 in)
  - Small tubes: 01 001–076: 54 mm (2 1/8 in), 129 off; 01 077–232: 70 mm (2 3/4 in), 106 off
  - Large tubes: 01 001–076: 143 mm (5 5/8 in), 43 off; 01 077–232:171 mm (6 3/4 in), 24 off
- Boiler pressure: 16 bar (16.3 kgf/cm^{2}; 232 psi)
- Heating surface
  - Firebox: 01 001–149: 17.00 m^{2} (183.0 sq ft); 01 150–232: 16.90 m^{2} (181.9 sq ft)
  - Tubes: 01 001–076, 233–242: 115.18 m^{2} (1,239.8 sq ft); 01 077–232: 147.19 m^{2} (1,584.3 sq ft)
  - Flues: 01 001–076, 233–242: 105.38 m^{2} (1,134.3 sq ft); 01 077–232: 83.06 m^{2} (894.1 sq ft)
  - Total surface: 01 001–076, 233–242: 237.56 m^{2} (2,557.1 sq ft); 01 077–149: 247.25 m^{2} (2,661.4 sq ft); 01 150–232: 247.15 m^{2} (2,660.3 sq ft)
- Superheater
  - Heating area: 01 001–076, 233–242: 100.00 m^{2} (1,076.4 sq ft); 01 077–232: 85.00 m^{2} (914.9 sq ft)
- Cylinders: Two, outside
- Cylinder size: 01 001–010: 650 mm × 660 mm (25.59 in × 25.98 in); 01 012–232: 600 mm × 660 mm (23.62 in × 25.98 in)
- Valve gear: Walschaerts (Heusinger) with lifting links
- Valve type: Piston Valve
- Train heating: Steam
- Loco brake: Knorr air brake
- Train brakes: Air
- Couplers: Screw Link
Performance figures
- Maximum speed: forwards: 120 or 130 km/h (75 or 81 mph) backwards: 50 km/h (31 mph)
- Indicated power: 2,240 PS (1,650 kW; 2,210 hp)
Career
- Operators: DR
- Retired: 1982
- Disposition: 17 Preserved, remainder scrapped

The Deutsche Reichsbahn-Gesellschaft's BR 01 steam locomotives were the first standardised (Einheitsdampflokomotive) steam express passenger locomotives built by the unified German railway system. They were of 4-6-2 "Pacific" wheel arrangement in the Whyte notation, or 2′C1′ h2 in the UIC classification. The idea of standardisation was that it would reduce maintenance costs; i.e. if a BR 01 whose engine shop was in, say, Berlin broke down in Dresden, instead of having to ship the necessary part from Berlin and take the locomotive out of service, a part from the Dresden shop could be used as all of the engines, parts, and workings were exactly the same and produced nationwide. Thus it was a "standard" product for engine shops.

== History ==
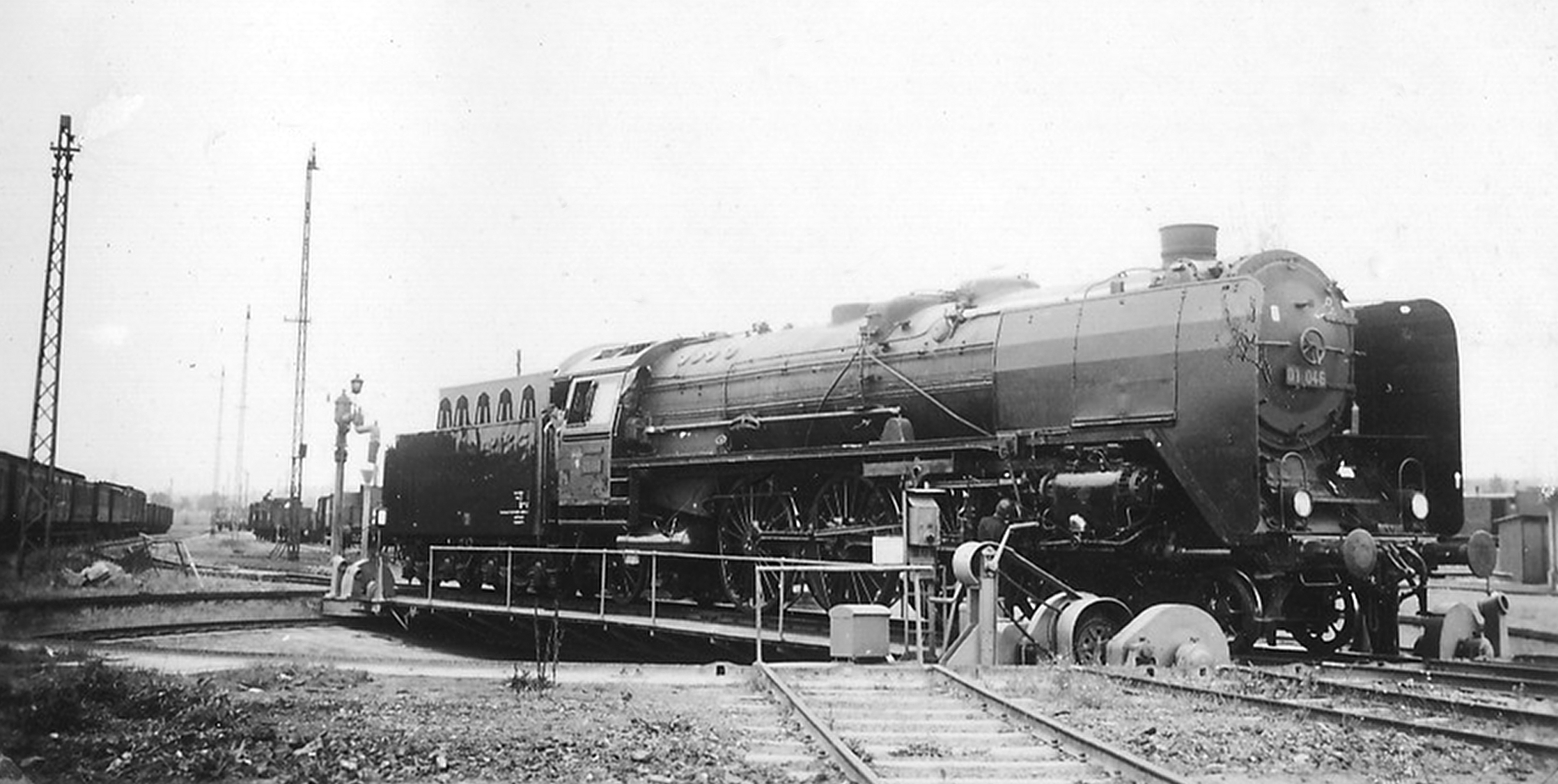
DRG steam locomotive 01 046 at the former RAW in Frankfurt am Main-Nied in the year 1938

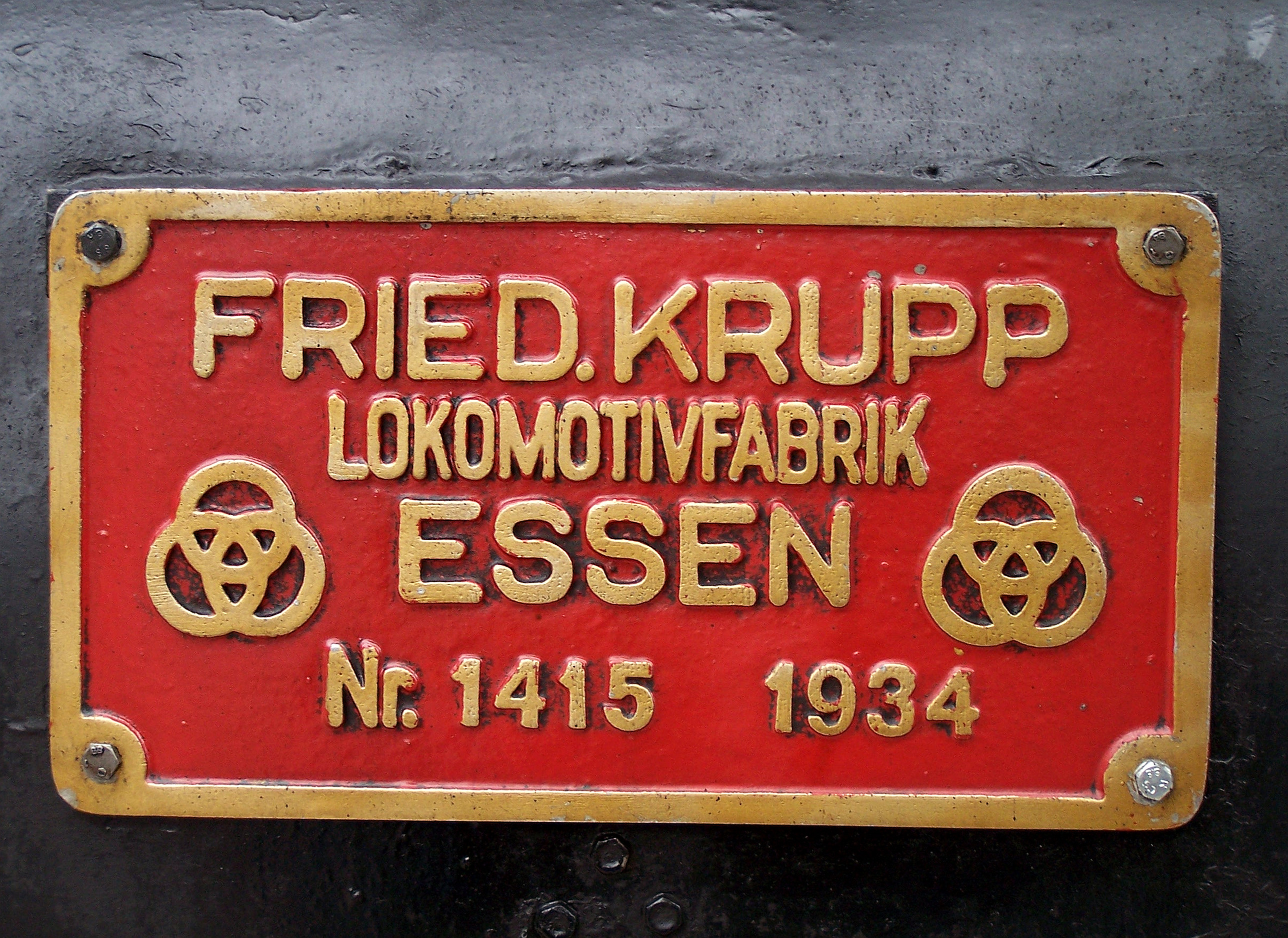
Manufacturer's plate of 01 118 of the Frankfurt Historic Railway

The firms of AEG and Borsig, who were the main manufacturers of these engines, together with Henschel, Hohenzollern, Krupp and BMAG previously Schwartzkopff, delivered a total of 231 examples of this Einheitsdampflokomotive between 1926 and 1938 for the fast passenger services of the Deutsche Reichsbahn.

To begin with, 10 locomotives of this class were built with two-cylinder engines for comparison purposes alongside a similar batch of 10 engines of their sister Class 02, which had four-cylinder compounding. Extensive measurement and trial runs were conducted, but after lengthy discussions the controversial decision finally fell in favour of the two-cylinder configuration, which was simpler to maintain but less powerful and less economical than the four-cylinder compounds.

The first Class 01 locomotive that went into service was not 01 001, but 01 008, which is preserved today in the Bochum-Dahlhausen Railway Museum. The mass production of Class 01s was somewhat delayed at first because in the 1920s there were neither enough routes with the necessary axle load of 20 tons nor sufficiently large turntables. Not until the beginning of the 1930s did the Class 01 become the predominant express train locomotive of the Deutsche Reichsbahn. By 1938 there were 231 Class 01 locomotives available for the prestigious express train duties. Another 10 four-cylinder Class 02 locomotives (01 111, 01 233–241) were converted to two-cylinder Class 01 models between 1937 and 1942. To accommodate for the many routes with axle load restrictions too low for Class 01 service, in the early 1930s, a third variant was created: the Class 03 designed with a two-cylinder engine and axle load of 18 ton, of which no less than 298 were built. Launched in 1939, the three-cylinder DRG Class 01.10 was a further development of the 01.

A total of five series or batches were delivered, each with minor variations: 01 001–010 (1926), 01 112–076 (1927–28), 01 077–101 (1930–31), 01 102–190 (1934–1936), 01 191–232 (1937–1938).

Even in the 1930s the employment of Class 01s was limited to the relatively few routes that had already been modified to take a 20-ton axle load. From Berlin outwards they were the Anhalt, Lehrte and Hamburg lines. The Berlin City Railway had first to be strengthened by reinforcing the viaduct arches. Up to 1930, the first 90 engines were stationed at the locomotive depots of Essen, Nuremberg, Erfurt P, Berlin Ahb, Hamm, Magdeburg Hbf, Kassel, Hanover, Hamburg Altona, Bebra and Offenburg. From 1931 they were also stabled at Frankfurt (M) 1, Berlin Leb, Braunschweig, Berlin Pog, Schneidemühl, Königsberg, Göttingen P, Paderborn, Dresden Alt, Breslau, Cologne Deutzerfeld, Hof and Halle P.

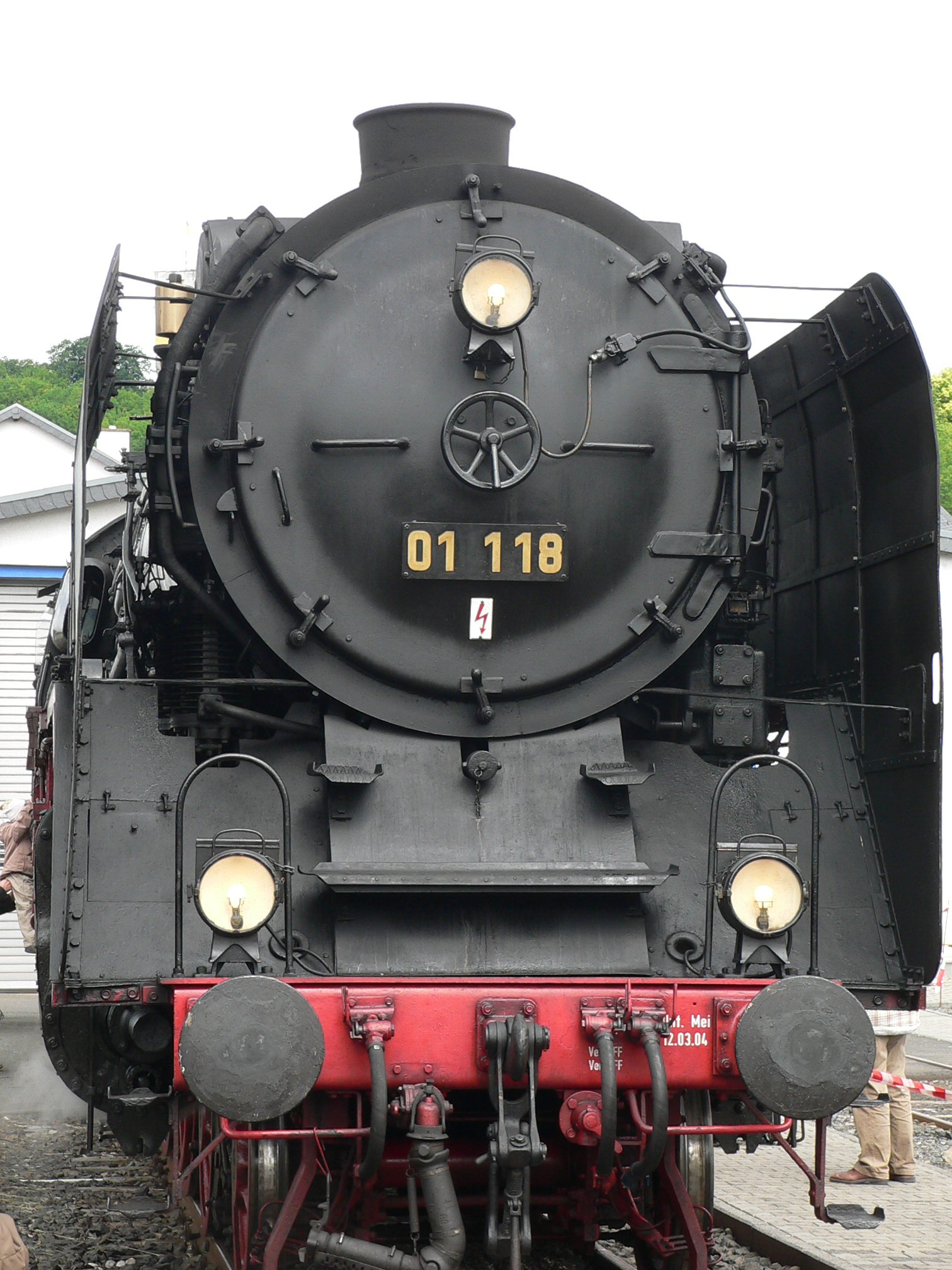
Locomotive 01 118 of the Frankfurt Historic Railway

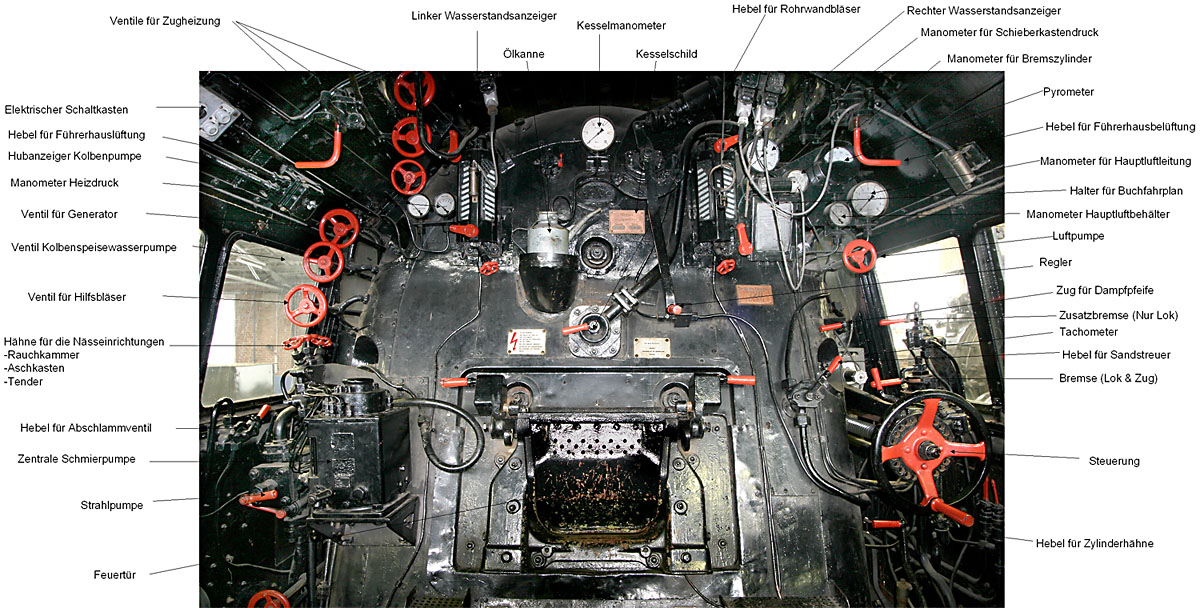
View of the driver's cab on locomotive 01 008

Originally, the Class 01's top speed was restricted to 120 km/h. In order to raise this to 130 km/h, the diameter of the leading wheels was changed from its original 850 mm to 1,000 mm on locomotives from operating number 01 102 onwards and brake effort was increased by installing double-sided working of the brake shoes on the coupled wheels and by braking the trailing wheels. The air and feed pumps were located in smokebox recesses behind the large Wagner smoke deflectors, which had been fitted from 01 077 onwards. (Earlier models were also refitted with Wagner type deflectors later). This made access to the pumps for maintenance purposes more difficult and later Einheitsloks had their pumps located in the middle of the vehicle on delivery. The Deutsche Bundesbahn converted their engines to the smaller Witte smoke deflectors and moved the pumps to the running board in the centre of the vehicle. The Deutsche Reichsbahn in East Germany shied away from such major changes to the load distribution, so that only minor modifications in appearance can be seen even in their last years.

From the third series (01 077 et seq.) the boilers were delivered with longer smoke tubes and thus a shorter firebox. All engines originally had a central lock for the smokebox door. The first locomotives had gas lighting on delivery; from 01 010 they had electrical lighting and the last few batches were given a third headlight.

The Class 01s were equipped with 2'2 T 30, 2'2' T 32 or 2'2' T 34 tenders. Their coal capacity was 10 tons of stone coal, and the water tank held either 30, 32 or 34 cubic metres of water. The prototype locomotives, 01 001 to 01 010, were supplied with the smaller 2'2 T 30 tenders, because there were not enough large turntables around. Later these tenders were only used if they were absolutely necessary, e.g. in cross-border services with the Netherlands. From the second series (01 012 et seq.) on, the Class 01 was furnished with rivetted 2'2' T 32 tenders. The welded tenders, class 2'2' T 34, appeared only by way of exchange (mainly from brand new Class 44) locomotives. Thereafter they were almost the only ones used during the war years and after the Second World War, because they had a larger water capacity.

Class 01 locomotives remained in service with the Deutsche Bundesbahn until 1973. In the DR, they were still working up to the early 1980s, largely in their original state with large smoke deflectors. They were legendary in their last years for hauling the D-Zug services on the Berlin-Dresden route up to autumn 1977. Only when the large Soviet DR Class 132 diesel locomotives arrived, the Class 01 express train locomotives were finally forced out of scheduled services in the GDR after almost 50 years.

== Rebuilds ==
=== Rebuilds 1950 to 1957 (DB) ===
Henschel mixer preheater rebuild
Type and origin
- Only changes from standard version shown
Specifications
- Axle load: 19.9 tonnes (19.6 long tons; 21.9 short tons)
- Adhesive weight: 59.7 tonnes (58.8 long tons; 65.8 short tons)
- Empty weight: 99.4 tonnes (97.8 long tons; 109.6 short tons)
- Service weight: 111.1 tonnes (109.3 long tons; 122.5 short tons)
- Firebox
  - Grate area: 4.31 m^{2} (46.4 sq ft)
- Boiler
  - Tube plates: 5,800 mm (19 ft 3/8 in)
  - Small tubes: 54 mm (2 1/8 in), 105 off
  - Large tubes: 143 mm (1/2 ft), 41 off
- Heating surface
  - Firebox: 22.00 m^{2} (236.8 sq ft)
  - Tubes: 93.75 m^{2} (1,009.1 sq ft)
  - Flues: 100.48 m^{2} (1,081.6 sq ft)
  - Total surface: 216.23 m^{2} (2,327.5 sq ft)
- Superheater
  - Heating area: 95.00 m^{2} (1,022.6 sq ft)
Performance figures
- Indicated power: 2,450 PS (1,800 kW; 2,420 hp)

In 1950 and 1951, the Deutsche Bundesbahn converted locomotives 01 042, 01 046, 01 112, 01 154 and 01 192. They were enhanced with a Heinl mixer preheater by Henschel and a turbo feed pump. In addition combustion chambers were installed in the boilers. Finally the conversion was rounded off with the replacement of the original smoke deflectors by Witte deflectors, which in spite of their considerably smaller size were just as effective as their larger predecessors. Four of the five modified locomotives remained in service until 1968.

=== Rebuilds 1957 to 1961 (new DB boiler) ===
New DB boiler design rebuild
Type and origin
- Only changes from standard version shown
Specifications
- Axle load: 19.3 tonnes (19.0 long tons; 21.3 short tons)
- Adhesive weight: 57.7 tonnes (56.8 long tons; 63.6 short tons)
- Empty weight: 96.6 tonnes (95.1 long tons; 106.5 short tons)
- Service weight: 108.3 tonnes (106.6 long tons; 119.4 short tons)
- Firebox
  - Grate area: 3.96 m^{2} (42.6 sq ft)
- Boiler
  - Tube plates: 5,000 mm (16 ft 4 7/8 in)
  - Small tubes: 54 mm (2 1/8 in), 96 off
  - Large tubes: 143 mm (5 5/8 in), 46 off
- Heating surface
  - Firebox: 22.00 m^{2} (236.8 sq ft)
  - Tubes: 73.93 m^{2} (795.8 sq ft)
  - Flues: 97.16 m^{2} (1,045.8 sq ft)
  - Total surface: 193.09 m^{2} (2,078.4 sq ft)
- Superheater
  - Heating area: 100.54 m^{2} (1,082.2 sq ft)
Performance figures
- Indicated power: 2,330 PS (1,710 kW; 2,300 hp)

From 1957 the Deutsche Bundesbahn rebuilt a further 50 vehicles. These engines were given welded, high-performance, steam boilers, which had already been used on the DRG Class 01.10. In addition a new mixer preheater system was installed in the smokebox and numerous plain bearings were replaced by roller bearings. Changes to the cylinder block, running board, a shorter chimney, front apron (Frontschürze) and locomotive frame, as well as the missing feedwater dome, all gave the locomotives a different external appearance.

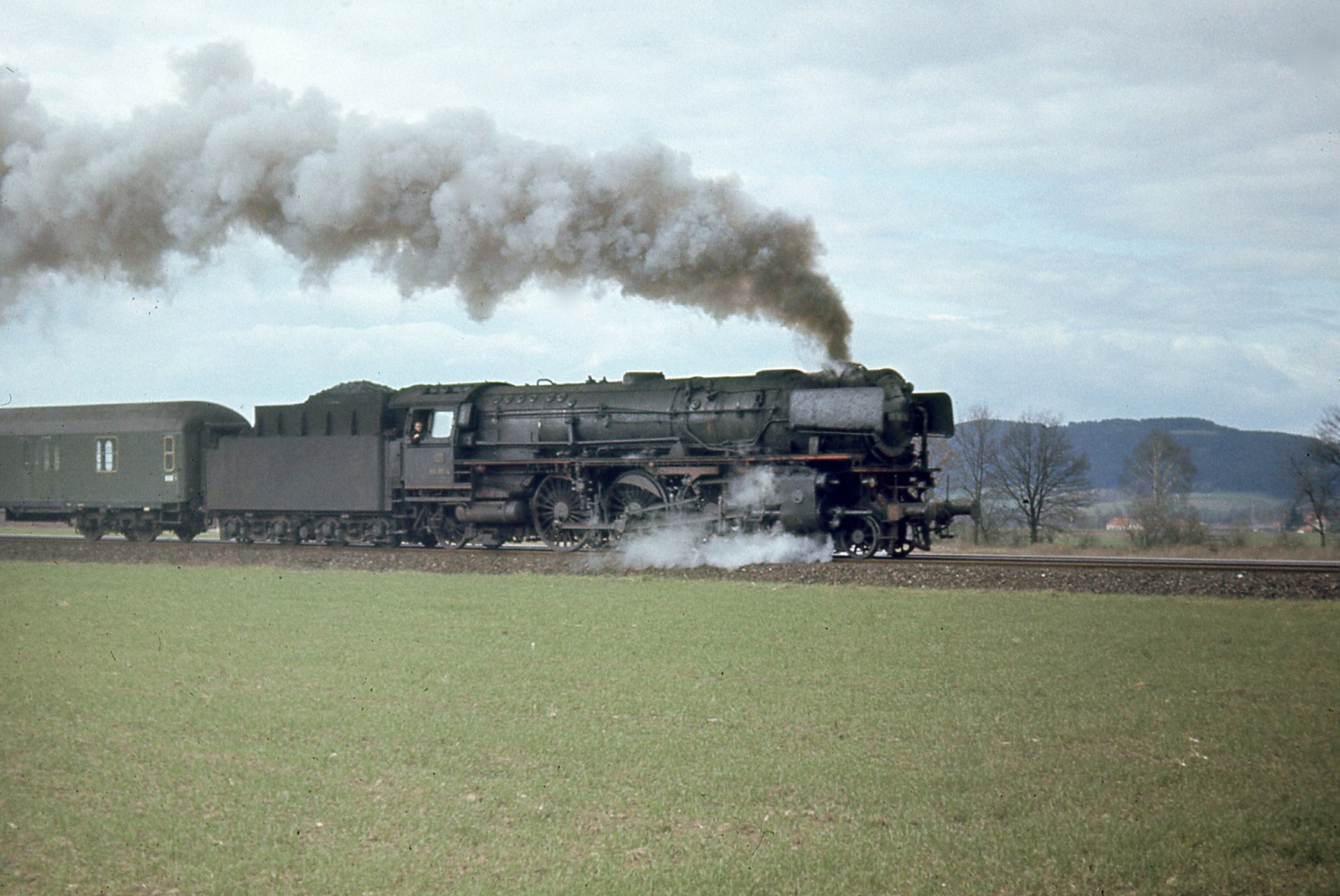
Reboilered 01 class near Hof at Easter 1972.

=== DR Reko locomotive 01.5 ===
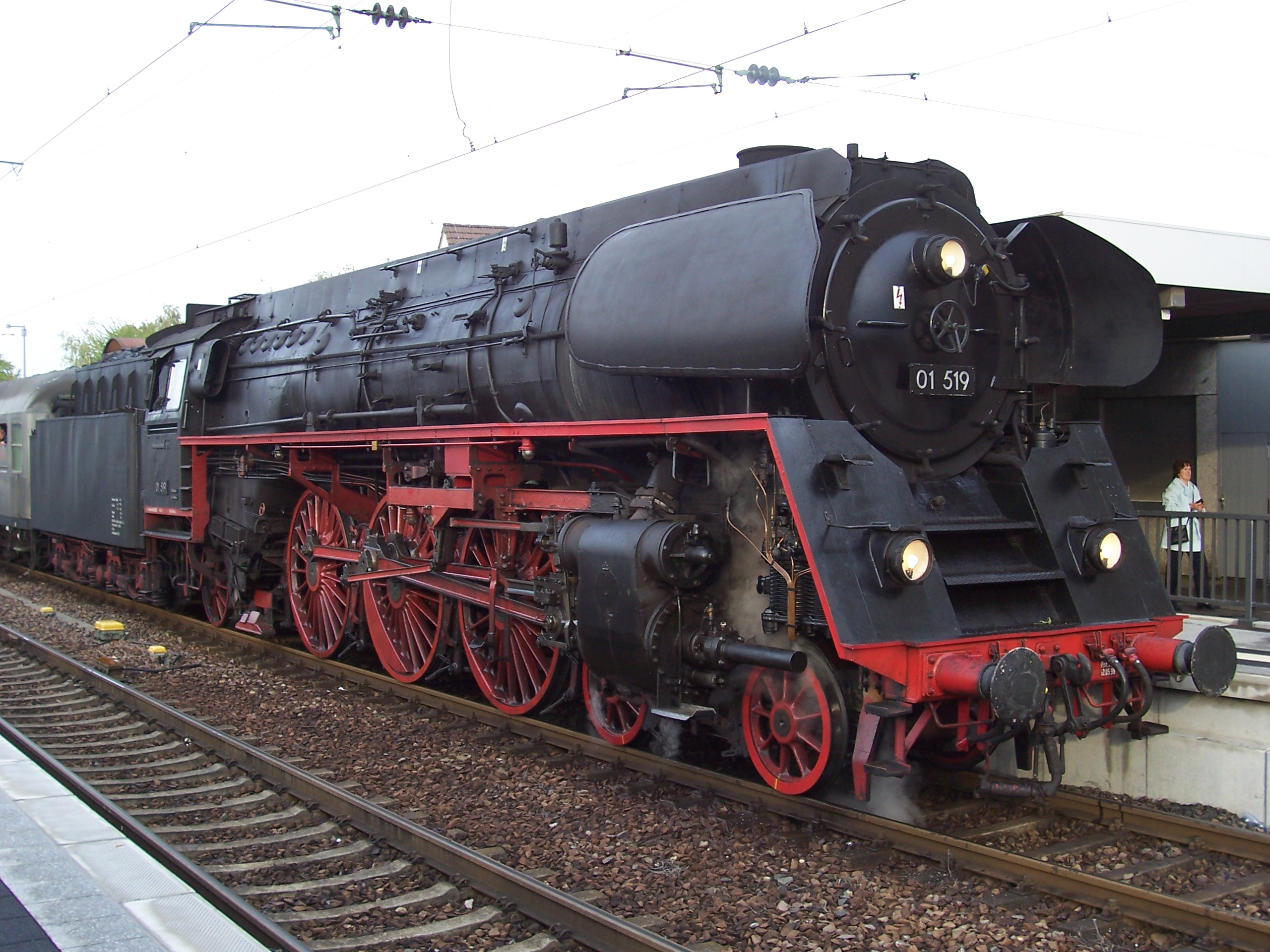
Rekolok 01 519

From 1962, the Reichsbahn repair shop (Reichsbahnausbesserungswerk) at Meiningen rebuilt 35 Class 01 engines for the DR under the direction of the research and trials division VES-M Halle. Like the DB, they selected only those locomotives with more powerful brakes (from 01 102). All these locos were fitted with new Witte smoke deflectors with tapered edges, a new driver's cab and a new boiler, positioned higher on the frame. The boiler had a combustion chamber, a mixer preheater and a continuous cover for the dome.

== Preserved locomotives ==
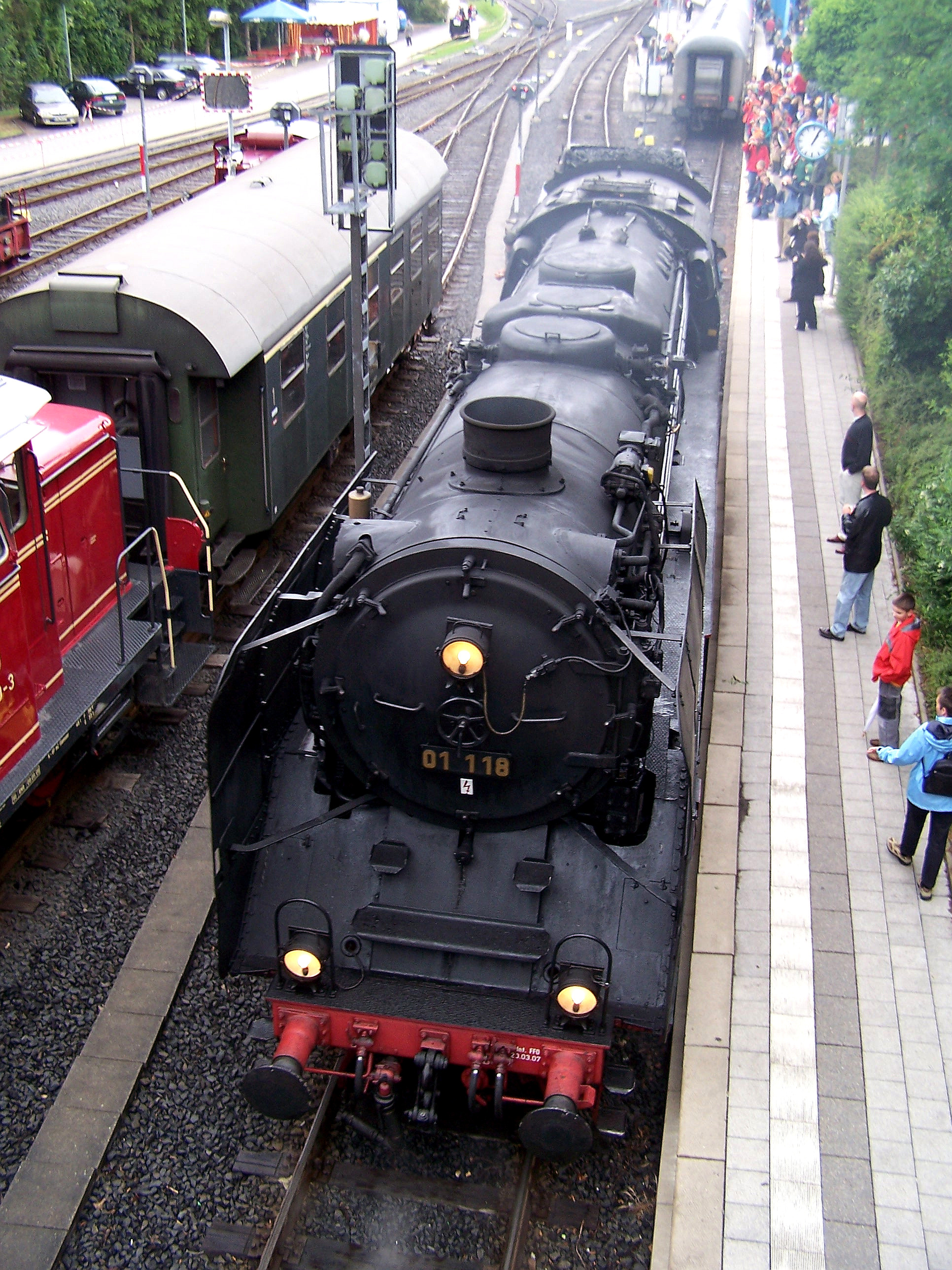
01 118 at Bahnhofsfest Königstein Pfingsten 2007 seen from front above

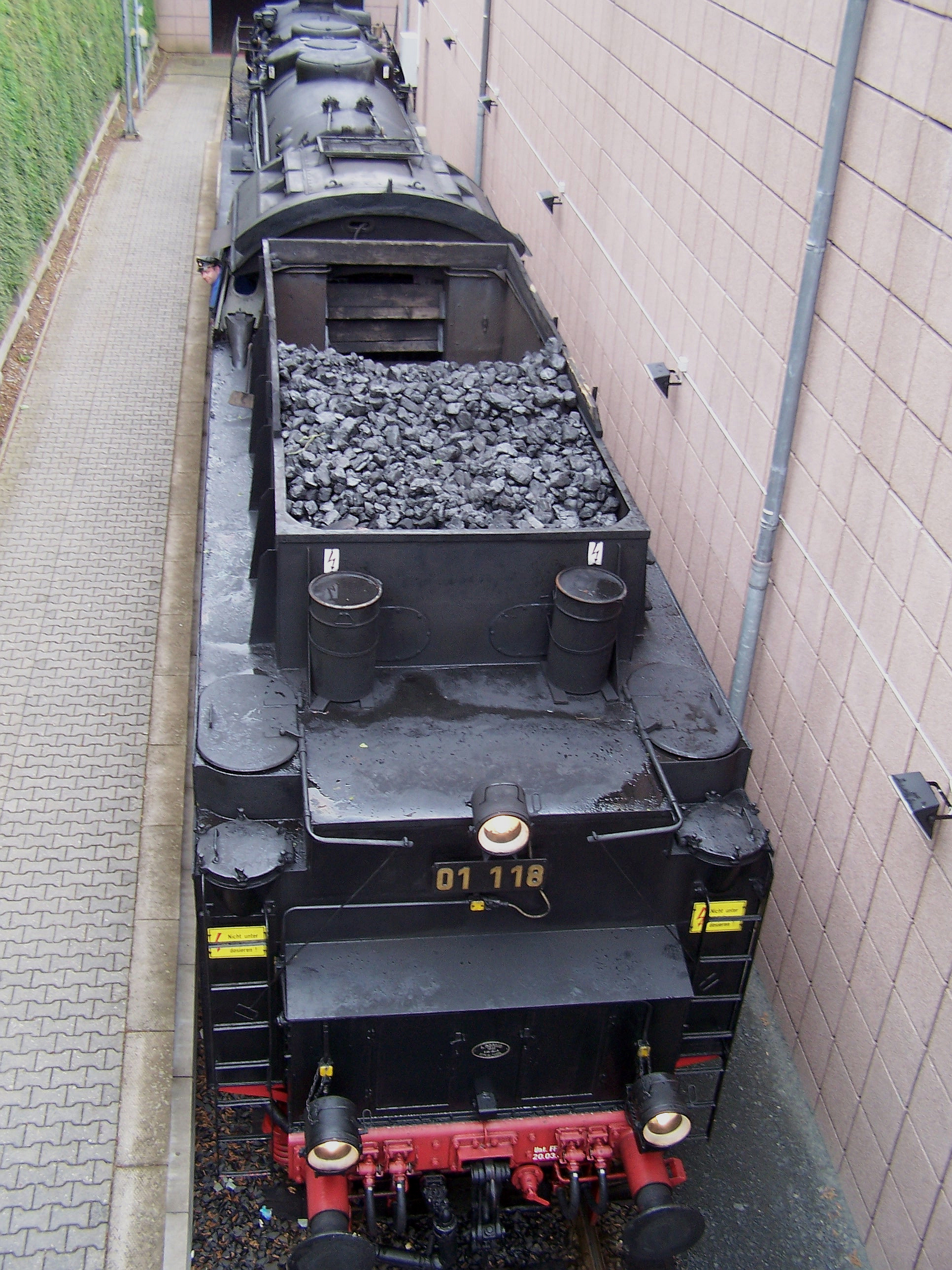
01 118 at Bahnhofsfest Königstein Pfingsten 2007 seen from back above

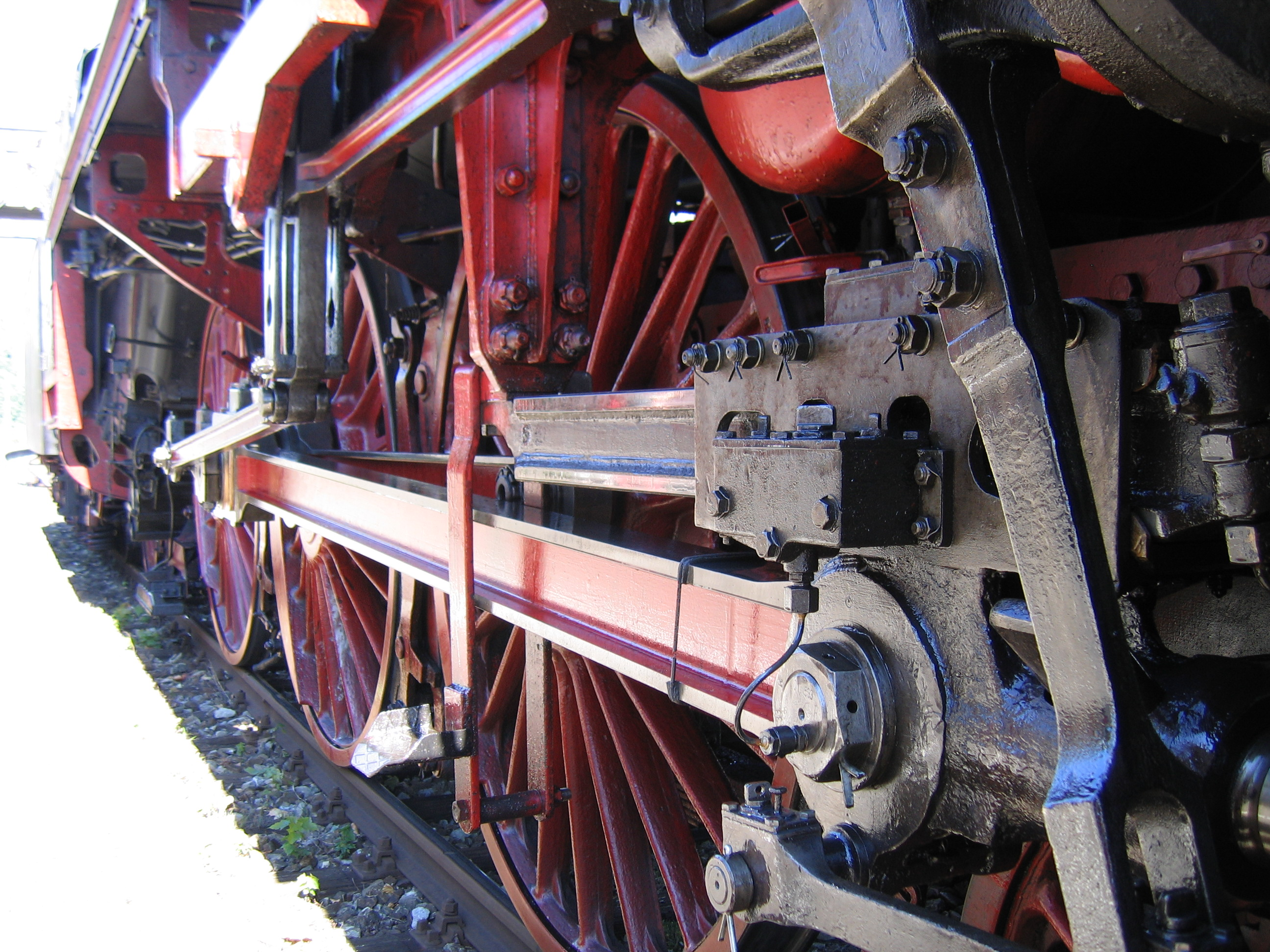
01 533 in Lindau Hbf

=== Operational locomotives ===
Only a few locomotives of the original design have been preserved unchanged over the course of time.

Of the two-cylinder Class 01 engines, the following are currently operational:

- 01 118, built in 1934, is the only one to have been operational without interruption until today. After the war it was in service with the DR; since 1981 it has belonged to the Historic Railway, Frankfurt (Historische Eisenbahn Frankfurt). From its base in Frankfurt Osthafen it is regularly used for museum services, including on the Frankfurt Harbour Railway (Frankfurter Hafenbahn).
- Another operational locomotive of this class is 01 066, built in 1928 by Schwartzkopff and which was on duty with the Deutsche Reichsbahn until 1977. Thereafter it was used as a heating engine until 1989 in the VEB Genthin washing powder factory in Nauen. The Bavarian Railway Museum in Nördlingen rebuilt the partly preserved locomotive in the Meiningen Steam Locomotive Works from individual components from other locomotives, including those of other classes – and put it back in service in summer 1993.
- The third operational locomotive is 01 202, that is worked by the Verein Pacific 01 202 in Switzerland. This loco was last in service with the DB and had Witte smoke deflectors. It has retained its original boiler, but lost the front apron. After its retirement in 1975, the engine was rebuilt again over 20 years with great initiative and made operational again. It was given a red livery stripe on the tender at the height of the running plate.
- Locomotive 01 116, which was built in 1934 with factory no. 1413 by Krupp and rebuilt in 1964/65 at RAW Meiningen, runs today as 01 533 with ÖGEG in Austria.
- 01 150 – DB Museum locomotive in DB configuration with Witte smoke deflectors. A new DLW Meiningen boiler was installed in 2012. On 17 October 2005 it was badly damaged by the great fire at the Nuremberg/Gostenhof locomotive depot. After inspecting the badly damaged steam engine at DLW Meiningen, DB AG initially intended just to carry out a cosmetic refurbishment; but after a donation marathon initiated by the last engine driver, Olaf Teubert, who collected nearly €1M within two years, a full operational restoration was enabled from 2011 to 2012. Since May 2013 the restored steam engine has been made operationally ready for use on the German railway network again.

=== Non-operational locomotives ===
In addition there are several Class 01 and 01.5 locomotives that have been preserved as non-operational exhibits:

- 01 005 – Dresden Transport Museum, ex-DR, largely in original configuration
- 01 008 – Bochum-Dahlhausen Railway Museum (the first 01 in service), in DB configuration (Witte smoke deflectors, original boiler)
- 01 111 – German Steam Locomotive Museum Neuenmarkt (not operational), largely in original configuration
- 01 137 – DB Museum locomotive, largely in original configuration

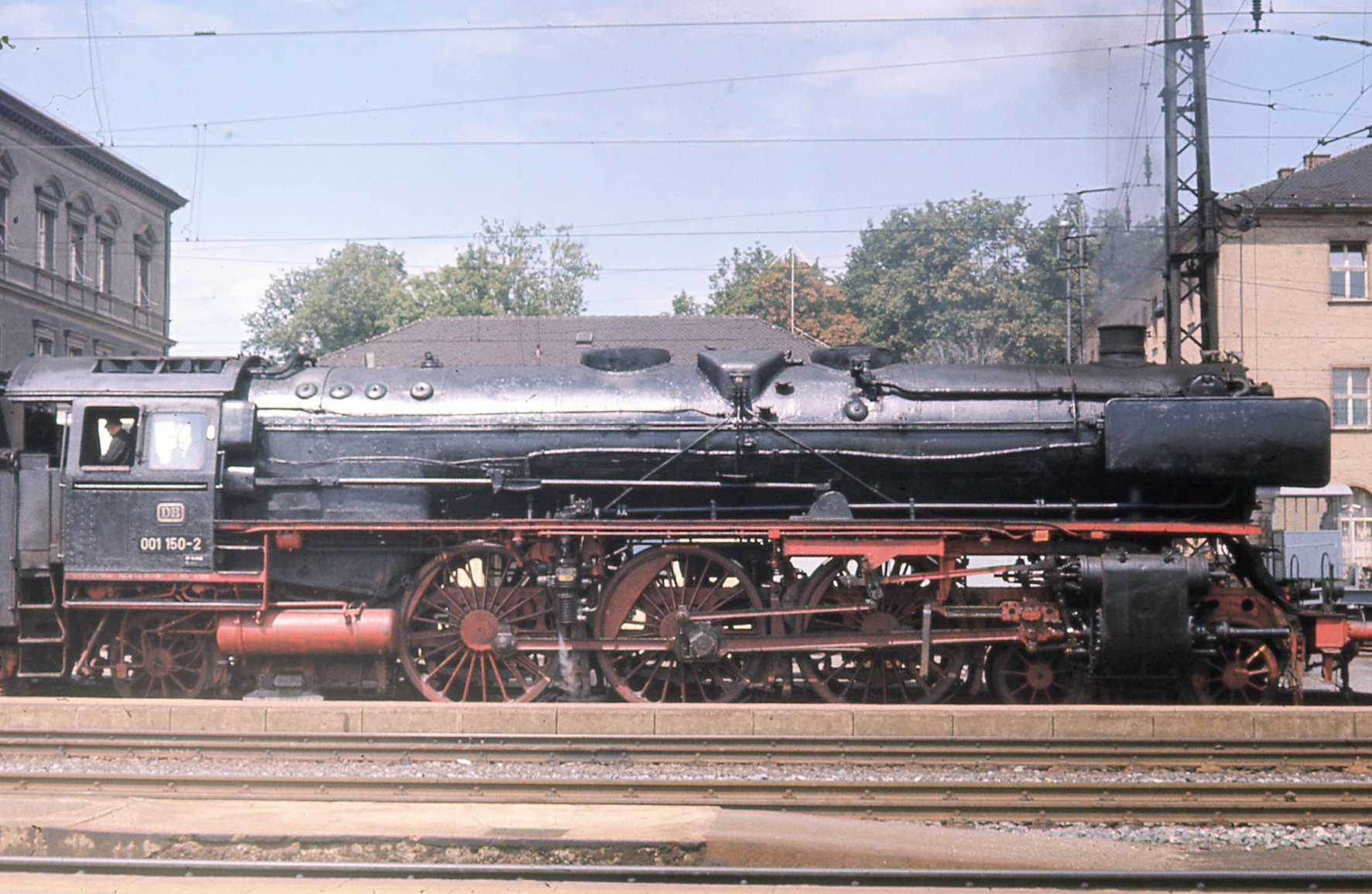
001 150-2 waits to leave Regensburg with a train for Hof, August 1973.

- 01 164 – German Steam Locomotive Museum Neuenmarkt, in DB configuration (Witte smoke deflectors, original boiler)
- 01 173 – Privately owned, on loan to the Deutsches Technikmuseum Berlin, in DB configuration (Witte smoke deflectors, original boiler)
- 01 204 – Privately owned, largely in original configuration
- 01 220 – Monument locomotive in Treuchtlingen, DB Museum locomotive, in DB configuration (Witte smoke deflectors, new DB boiler)
- 01 509 (ex 01 143) - Ulm Railway Friends (oil-fired, currently in for repairs at Meiningen Steam Locomotive Works due to boiler damage.
- 01 514 (ex 01 208) - Technik Museum Speyer
- 01 519 (ex 01 186) - Eisenbahnfreunde Zollernbahn
- 01 531 (ex 01 158) - Nuremberg Transport Museum; museum loco at Arnstadt locomotive depot, currently not operational. This locomotive was involved in the 1939 Genthin rail disaster.

== PC games ==
- The engine is featured in the 2006 PC game, Sid Meier's Railroads!, as an engine available for purchase in German scenario, albeit missing a tender and several key details.

== See also ==
- List of DRG locomotives and railbuses
- List of preserved steam locomotives in Germany
