= Historic Railway, Frankfurt =

Heritage railway in Frankfurt am Main

Coordinates: 50°6′55.8″N 8°43′47.1″E

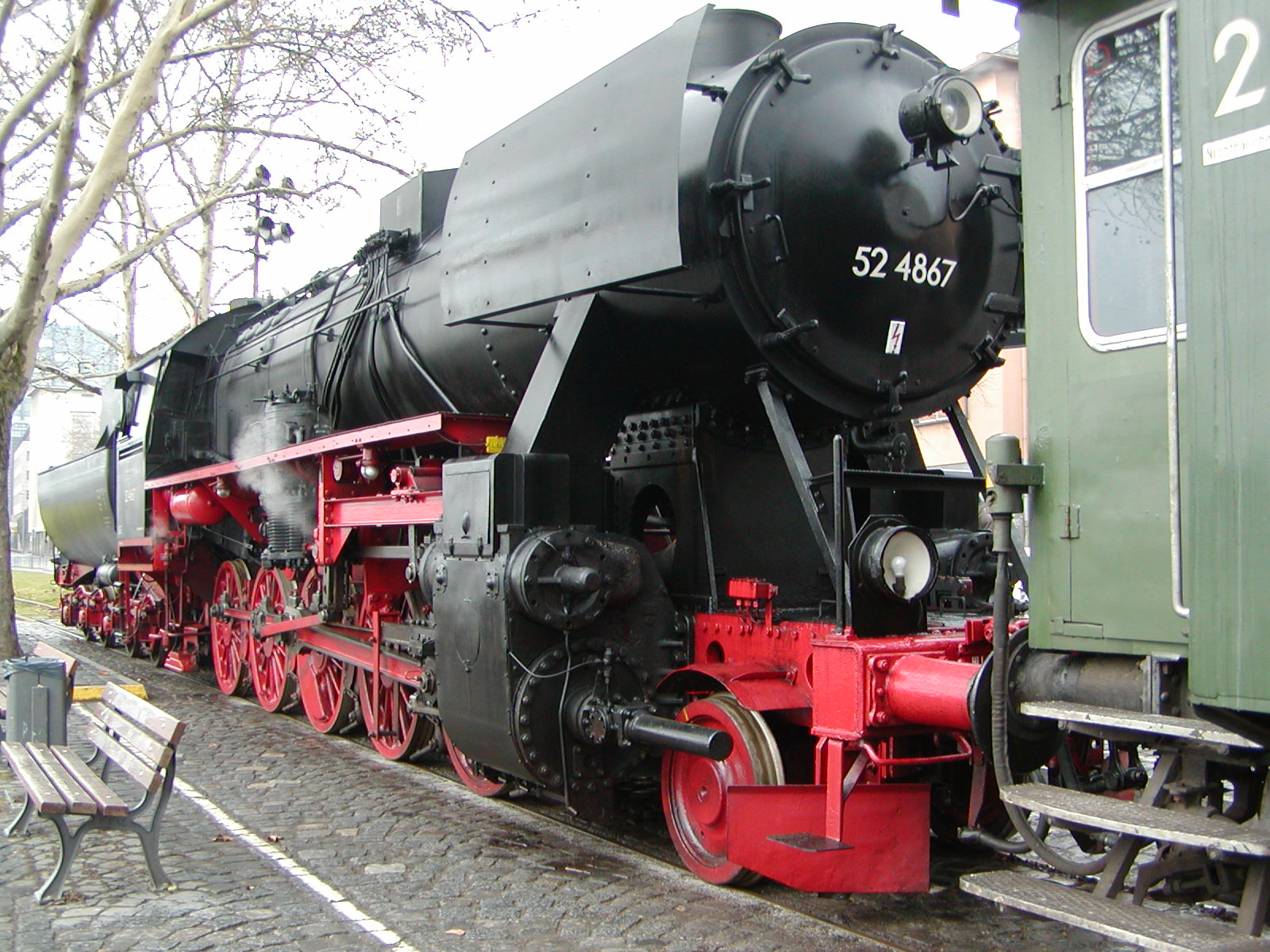
Locomotive 52 4867 of the Historic Railway, Frankfurt

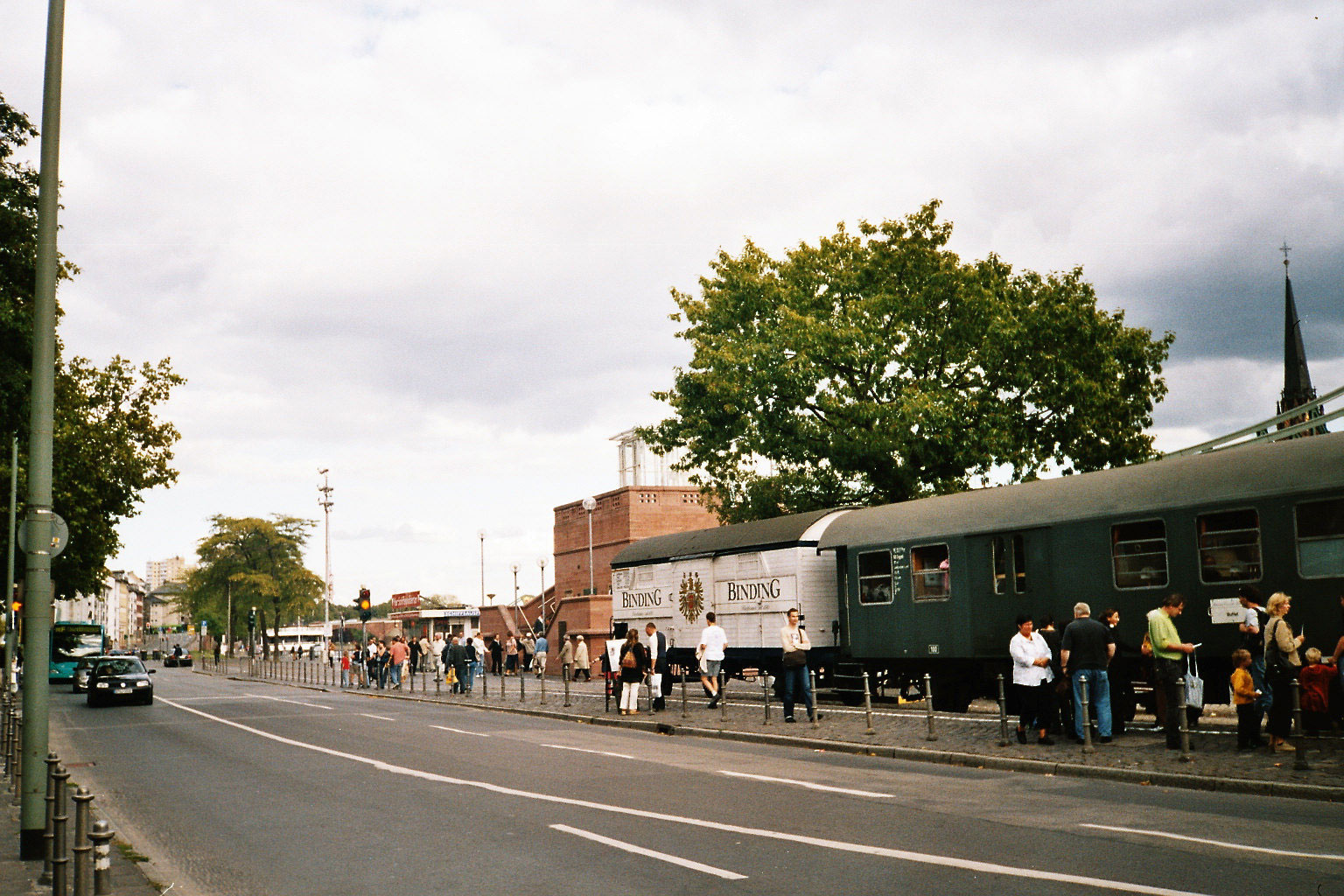
Historic train at Eiserne Steg

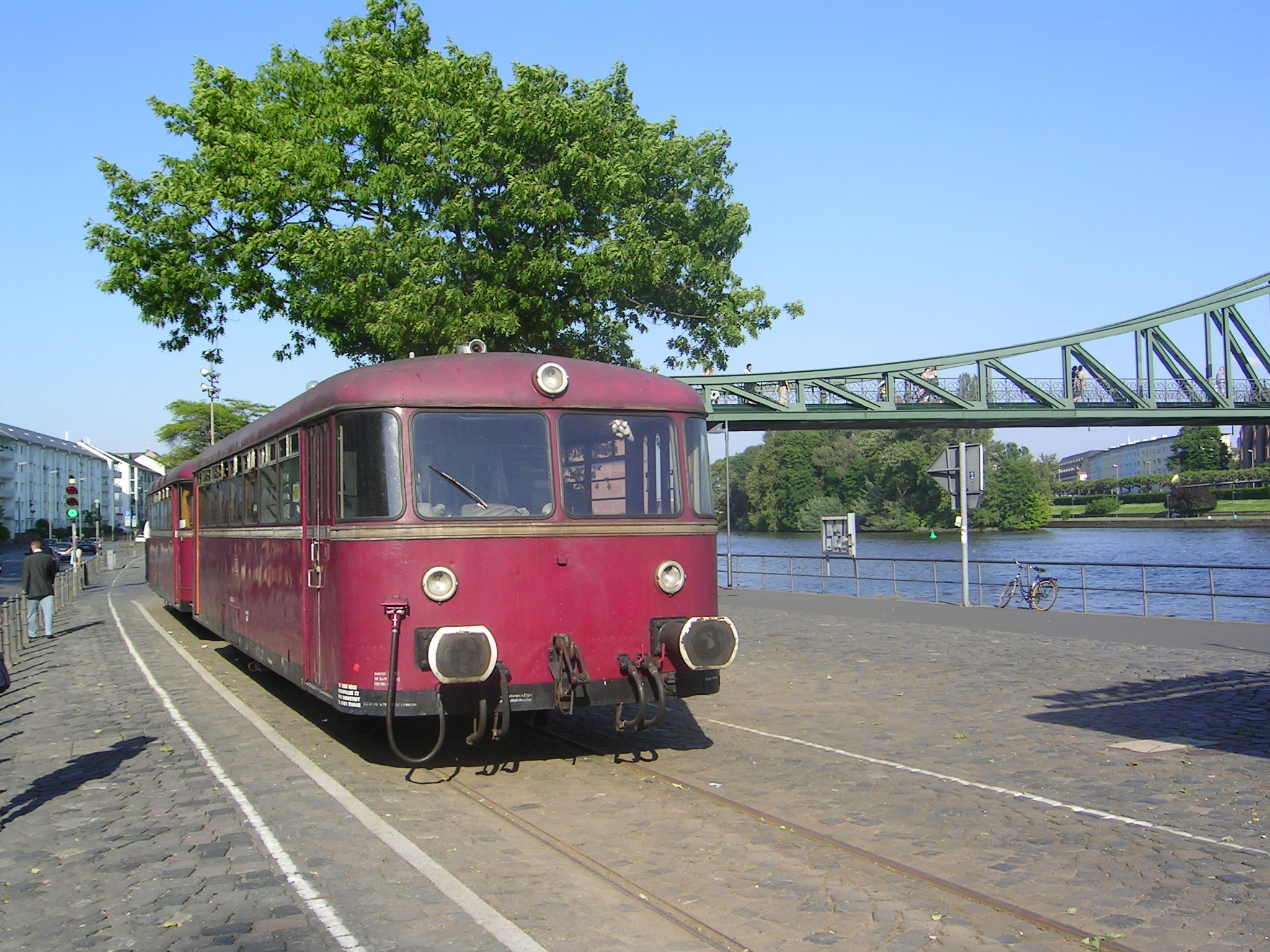
Railbus rake on the link line

The Historic Railway, Frankfurt (Historische Eisenbahn Frankfurt) or HEF is a German museum railway in Frankfurt am Main. The society was founded in 1978 and its aim is the preservation of historic, valuable railway materiel in working order, especially steam locomotives, as technical and cultural monuments.

Since 1979 there has been a regular museum service several weekends a year on the tracks of the Frankfurt Harbour Railway (Frankfurter Hafenbahn) between the halts of Mainkur, Eiserner Steg and Frankfurt-Griesheim. Since 1981 the society has organised the Königstein railway festival (Bahnhofsfest Königstein) every year at Whitsun, when the Königsteiner Bahn between Frankfurt-Höchst and Königstein im Taunus is operated. In addition vehicles of the Historic Railway, Frankfurt are used in special services throughout Germany.

== Rolling stock ==
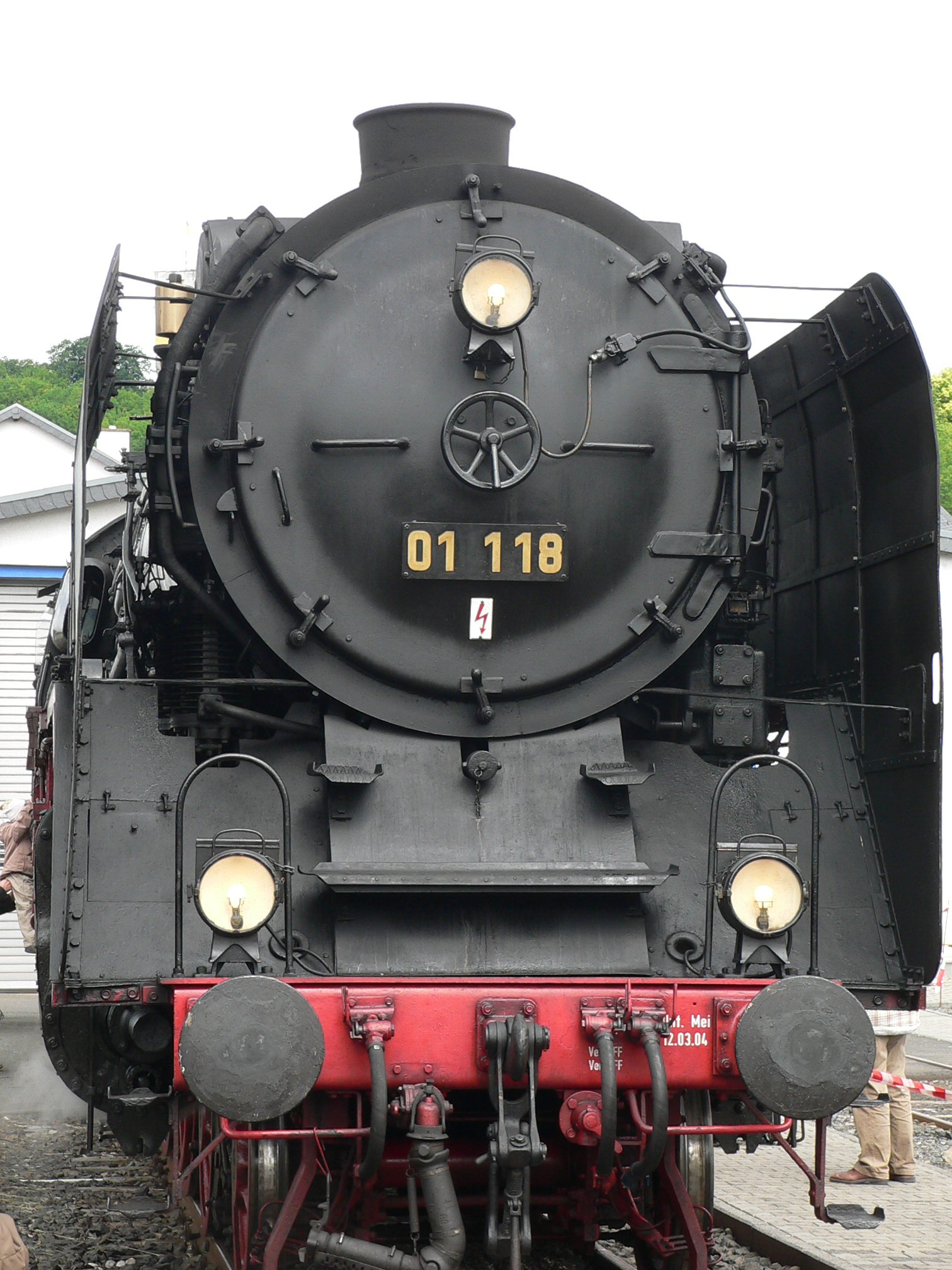
01 118

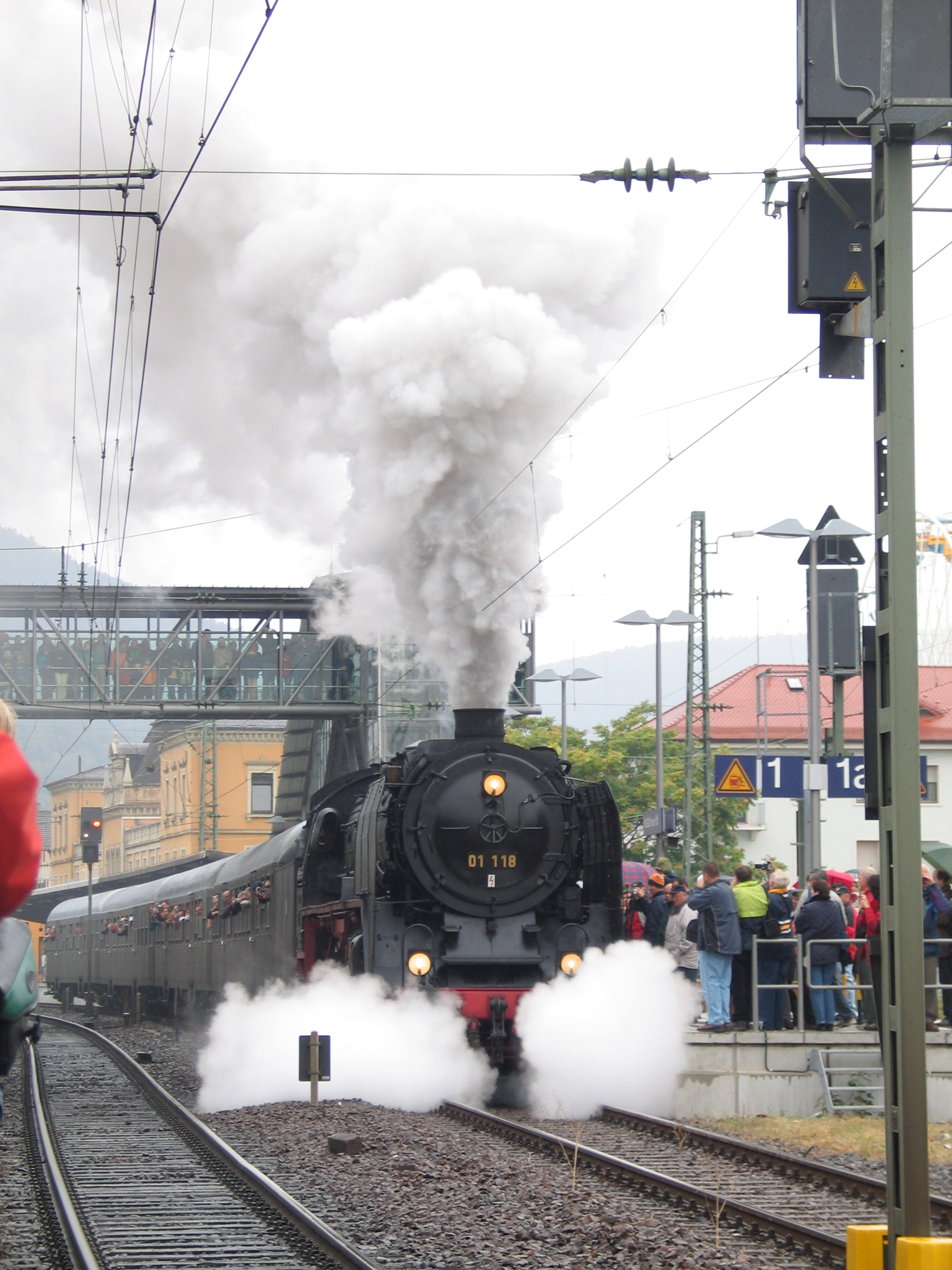
01 118 at Neustadt (Weinstraße) station

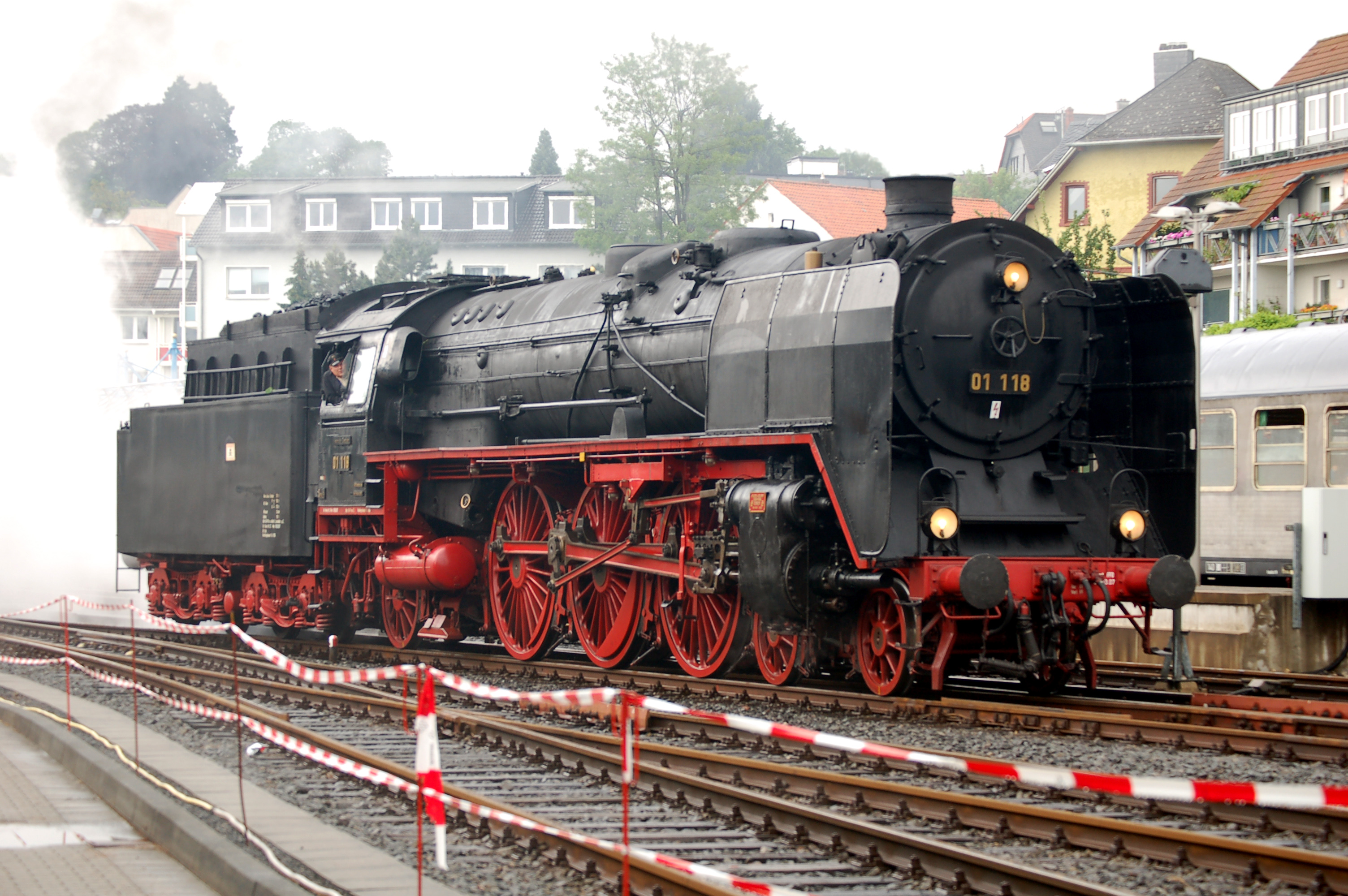
01 118 at the Königstein station festival

The society has several operational locomotives. The most famous and historically important is the DRG Class 01 express train, steam locomotive, number 01 118.

=== Steam locomotive 01 118 ===
The locomotive was built by Krupp in Essen in 1934 under works number 1415 and is the only one of its class still in existence today that has seen unbroken operational service. It was delivered on 18 December 1934 and officially taken over by the Deutsche Reichsbahn on 24 December 1934. The purchase price for the engine and tender was 208,597 Reichsmarks. It began its duties on 2 January 1935 and in March 1939 it was fitted with an inductive train control (PZB).

Over the course of time, the locomotive was stationed in various central German locomotive sheds (Betriebswerke. After the end of the Second World War it was left in the Soviet Zone of Occupation and was incorporated in the Deutsche Reichsbahn's fleet in East Germany, where it was given the computer number 01 2118-6 in 1970.

During its entire service the Reichsbahn did not carry out any major conversion or modernisation of the engine. As a result, its appearance has remained unchanged; something which is especially evinced by the large Wagner smoke deflectors. Instead of the original rivetted tender, the locomotive was coupled with a Class 2'2'T 34 tender which was delivered by Borsig in 1941 under the works number 15117. Over the course of the years the boiler has been replaced several times. Its present boiler, which is the seventh, was fitted in July 1973. It came originally from locomotive 01 191, built in 1937, and was last used on locomotive 01 089.

Until its sale to the Historic Railway, Frankfurt, on 5 November 1981 it had covered 3,559,271 kilometres according to its log. Her last locomotive depot (Bahnbetriebswerk) was Bw Saalfeld in the Reichsbahn division of Erfurt.

Its sale was handled by the Kunst und Antiquitäten GmbH, a branch of the Kommerzielle Koordinierung. This government department of East Germany's Foreign Ministry, headed by Alexander Schalck-Golodkowski, had the task of acquiring foreign exchange assets through the sale of art and antiquities to customers in the West. After the bill of sale had been paid, the locomotive was on its way to the West on 7 November 1981 together with two other historic locomotives, numbers 35 1097 (formerly 23 1097) and 03 2098.

Since 1981 the locomotive has been used for steam specials, initially on the Frankfurt Harbour Railway and since 1985 on public railway lines. The engine underwent the required general inspections in 1991, 1995, 1999 and 2003 and can therefore continue to be used for special trips, that have taken it so far to France, Luxembourg, the Netherlands and Switzerland. In spring 2004 the locomotive was fitted with the PZB 90 train safety system. She is stationed at Frankfurt Eastern Harbour.

Up to 2006 the specials were organised by the Nuremberg Transport Museum. In addition to the traditional events held by the Historic Railway, Frankfurt, she also took part, for example, in the Frankfurt Harbour celebrations in August 2006, as part of the 'Rhine-Main route of industrial heritage'.

Apart from the numerous photographs and films, that railway fans and train spotters have produced on her appearances, the locomotive played an important side role in the 2001 TV melodrama Geraubte Liebe ('Stolen Love'), that was shown by Hessischer Rundfunk.

Locomotive 01 118 is the prototype for several models in various gauges. In 2004, for their 70th anniversary, a model railway manufacturer in Viernheim made a brass model of 01 118 in 1:45 (I) scale, that was produced as a limited edition. It is also available as a model from the trade in TT gauge.

=== Steam locomotive 52 4867 ===
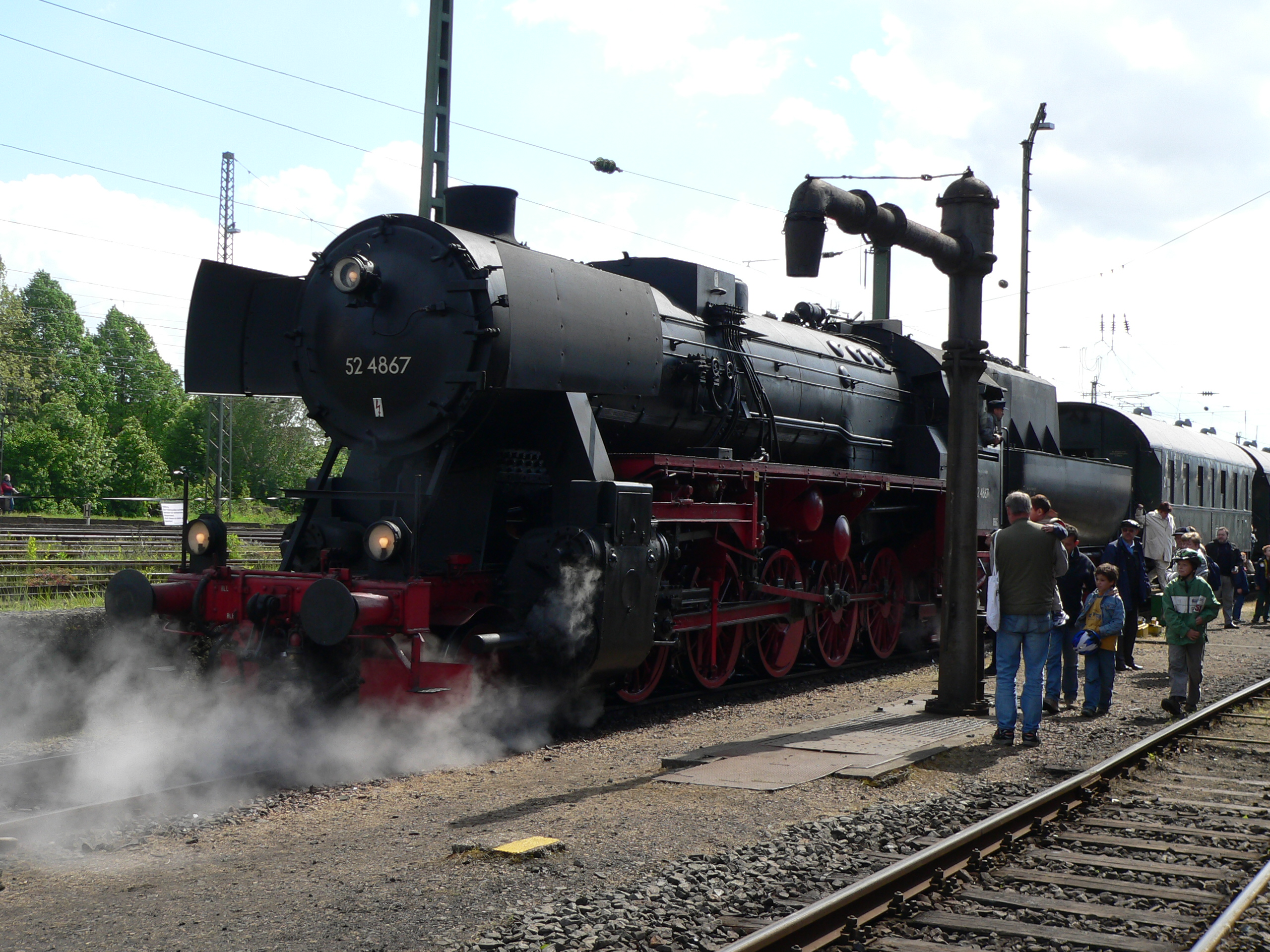
52 4867 in Kranichstein

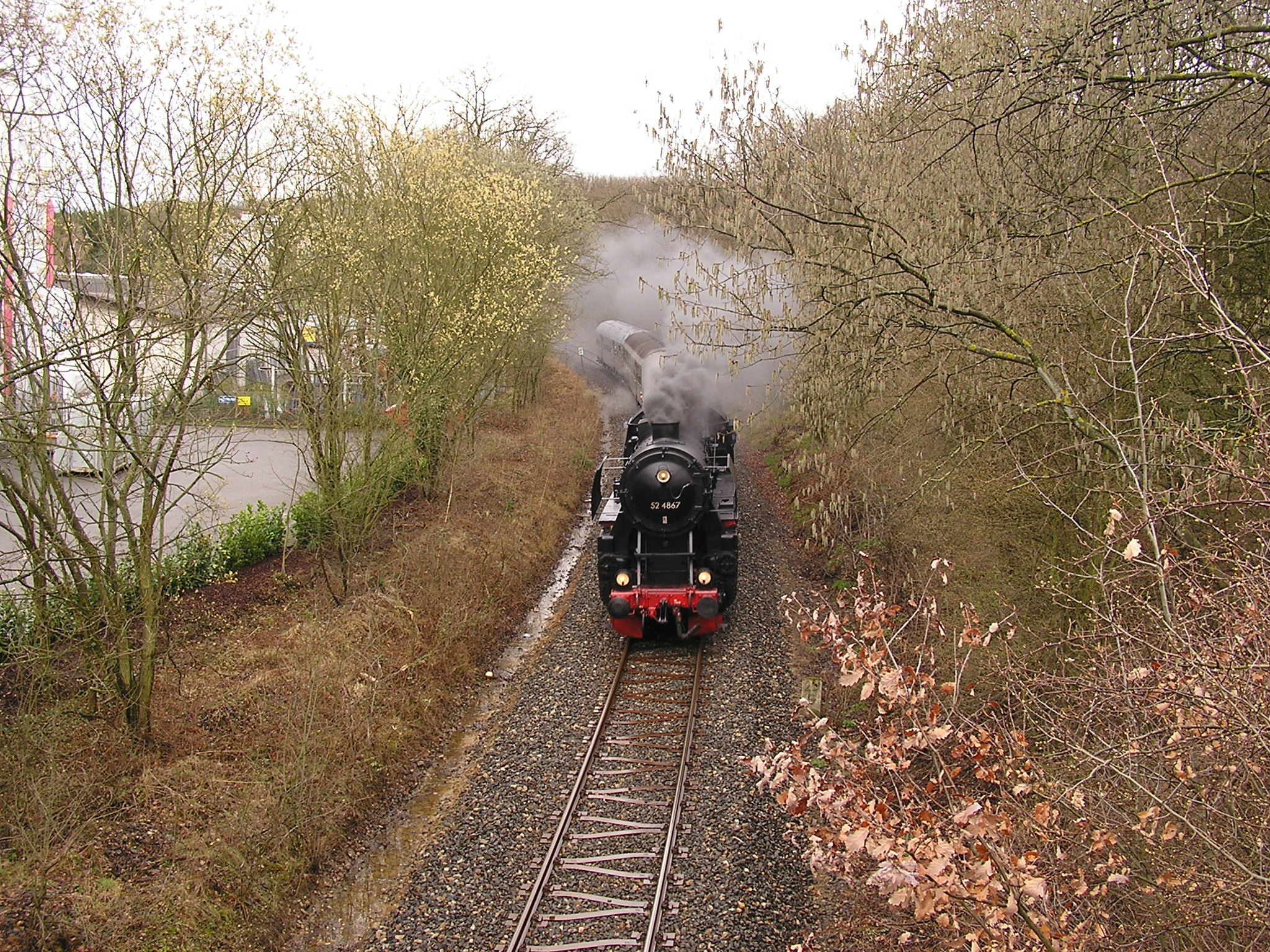
52 4867 on the Friedberg-Friedrichsdorf line

The DRG Class 52 goods train locomotive, 52 4867, was built in 1943 and was left in Austria after the Second World War. In 1980 it was acquired by the Historic Railway, Frankfurt, from the Graz-Köflacher Eisenbahn- und Bergbaugesellschaft.

She carried out an unusual duty in October 2007. When the tracks on the curve of the Bäderbahn (Homburger Damm) – a link line in west Frankfurt normally worked by the Taunusbahn – needed to be completely refurbished, the firm carrying it out decided on cost grounds, to charter the goods train locomotive from the Historic Railway, Frankfurt, as motive power for the heavy works trains. Number 52 4867 hauled wagons laden with track ballast in a 64-hour continuous shift to the Frankfurt (Main) Höchst goods station. Likewise she was used for duties on the Main-Neckar bridge at Easter 2008.

=== Other locomotives ===
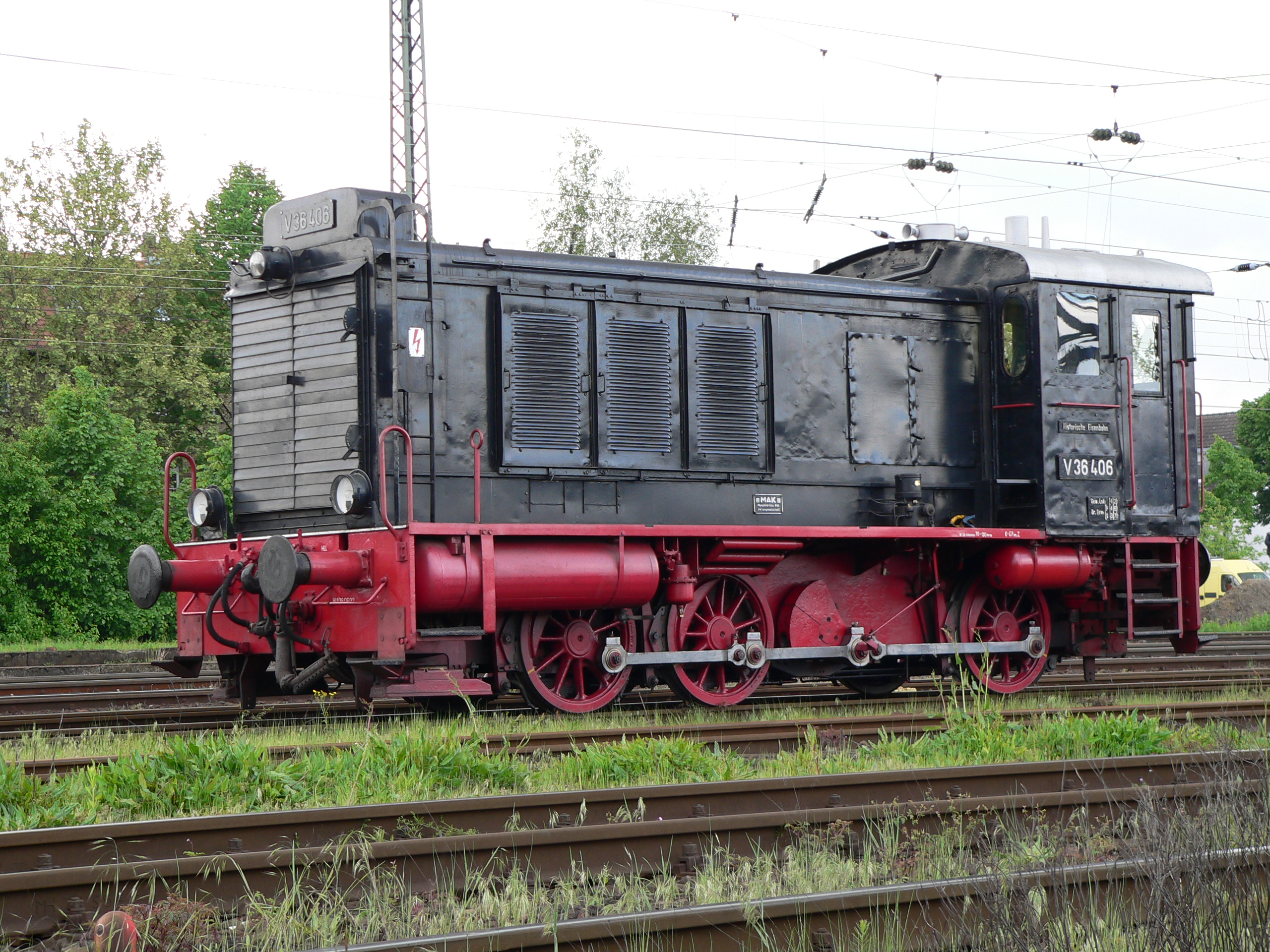
Locomotive V36 406 of the Historic Railway, Frankfurt

- Two former military (Wehrmacht) diesel locomotives of class V 36. These two Deutsche Bundesbahn engines, V 36 405 and V 36 406, built in 1950, were acquired by the HEF after their retirement in 1981 and 1979 respectively. Of the two, number V 36 406 remains in working condition.
- A DRG Köf II shunter. Köf 5712, built in 1942 was initially used at the Peenemünde military research institute Heeresversuchsanstalt Peenemünde and ended up in the Deutsche Reichsbahn in Erfurt, East Germany after the Second World War. In 1995 it was retired, was refurbished in 1998 and has been operational since 2000. Another Kö II, number 4293 built in 1934, is in private hands. It has been used, on loan, by the HEF since its restoration in 2004.
- A railbus set of class VT 98, comprising the traction car 798 629-2, the driving car 996 683-9 and the two trailer cars 998 175-4 and 996 257-5, was made available to the HEF by a railway society. The traction car, control car and first trailer car are working.

=== Passenger coaches ===
The society has a range of historic passenger coaches, including 13 eight-wheeled wagons of class Bm 234, a saloon car as well as twelve six-wheeled Class 3yg coaches.
