= Lokomotiv-Versuchsamt Grunewald =

Railway vehicle trial facility in Berlin-Grunewald, Germany

The Lokomotiv-Versuchsamt Grunewald or LVA ('Grunewald Locomotive Research Office') was a facility established from 1920 to 1945 at Berlin-Grunewald in Germany that conducted trials on railway vehicles. The office used the facilities of the railway repair shop (Ausbesserungswerk) at Grunewald on the Berlin Stadtbahn southwest of Berlin's Westkreuz station.

== History ==
After the Deutsche Reichsbahn-Gesellschaft was founded in 1925 the Railway Central Office (Eisenbahn-Zentralamt or EZA) that had existed since 1906 was renamed to the Reichsbahn Central Office (Reichsbahnzentralamt or RZA). Amongst other things, they carried out numerous trials on steam locomotives and created the scientific basis for the performance measurement of railway vehicles. From 1920 they were supported by the Lokomotiv-Versuchsamt Grunewald, a locomotive trials office based at the main railway workshop at Grunewald. In 1936 there were 152 employees working for this research establishment.

In 1945 the work at Grunewald ended, due to the war, and was continued in East Germany at RAW Dessau as well as in Halle, and in West Germany initially at Göttingen, and later in Minden and Munich.

The Office had instrumentation vehicles, a rolling test bed with water brakes for locomotives and test rigs for various vehicle components.

== Key personalities ==
The following employees are particularly closely associated with the establishment:

- Robert Garbe (1847–1932)
- Hans Nordmann (1879–1957)
- Richard Paul Wagner (1882–1953)

== Grunewald Research Office today ==
At the site today are a few Deutsche Bahn office buildings, several small firms and a golf course.

== Gallery ==
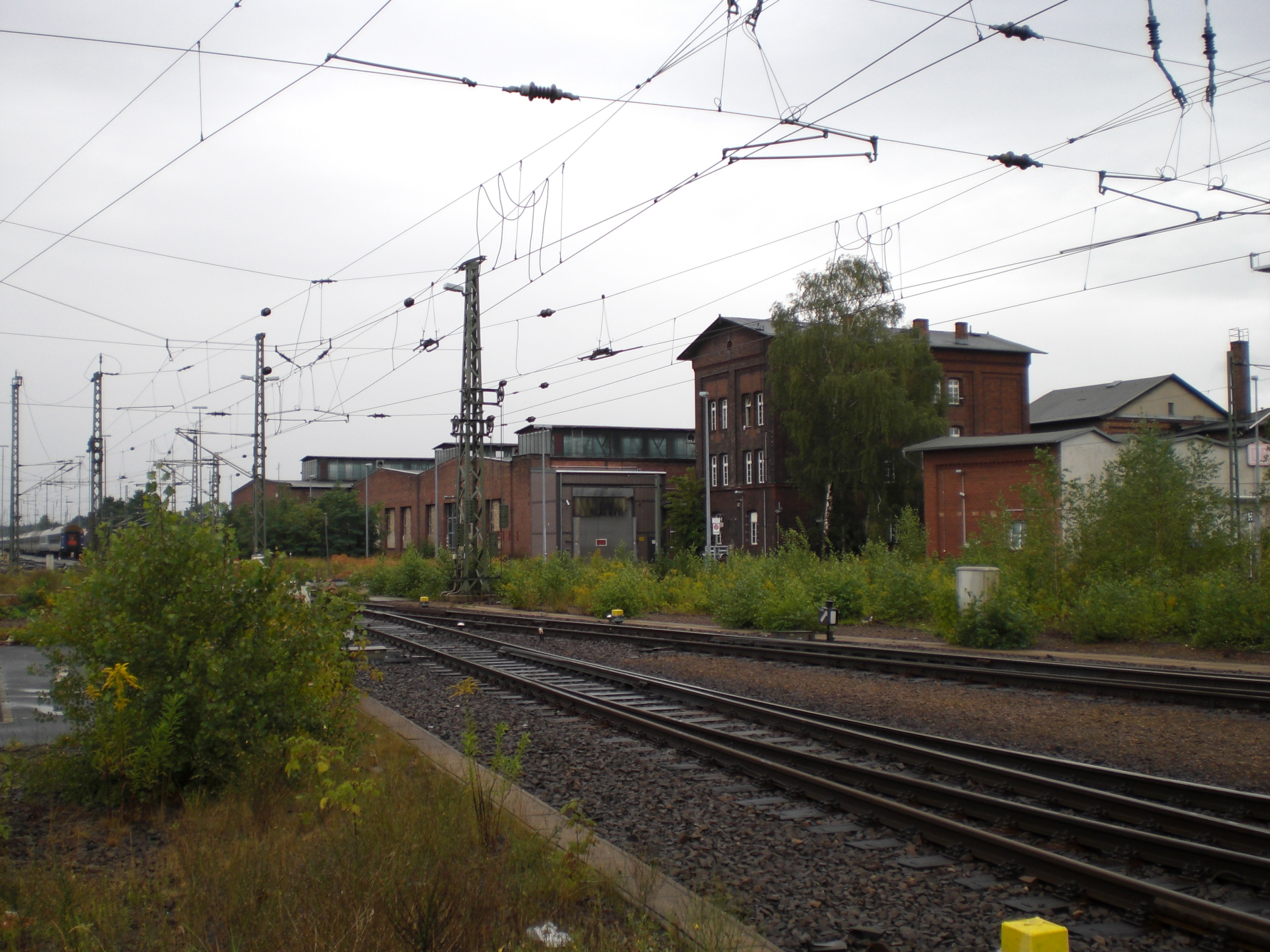

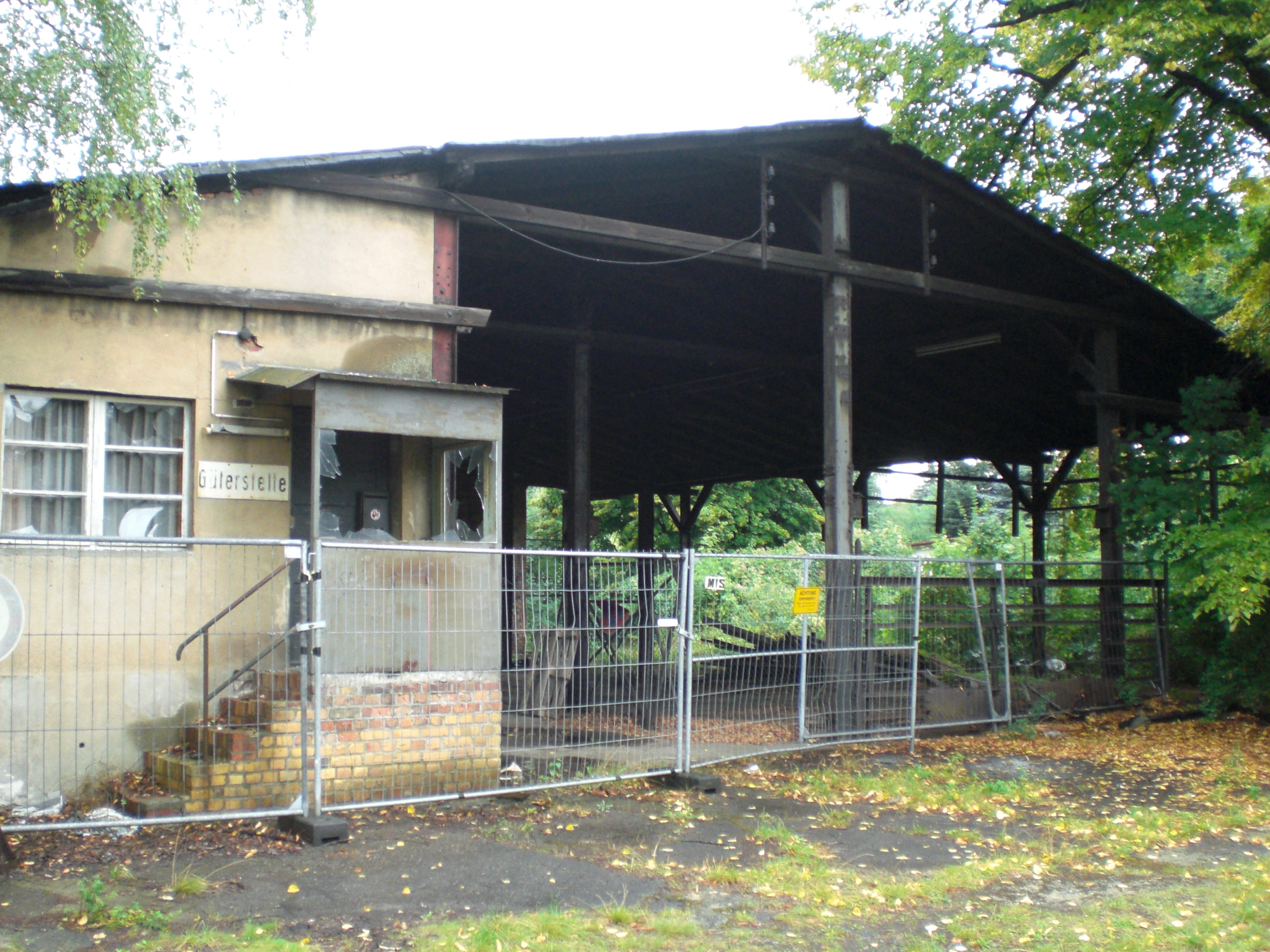

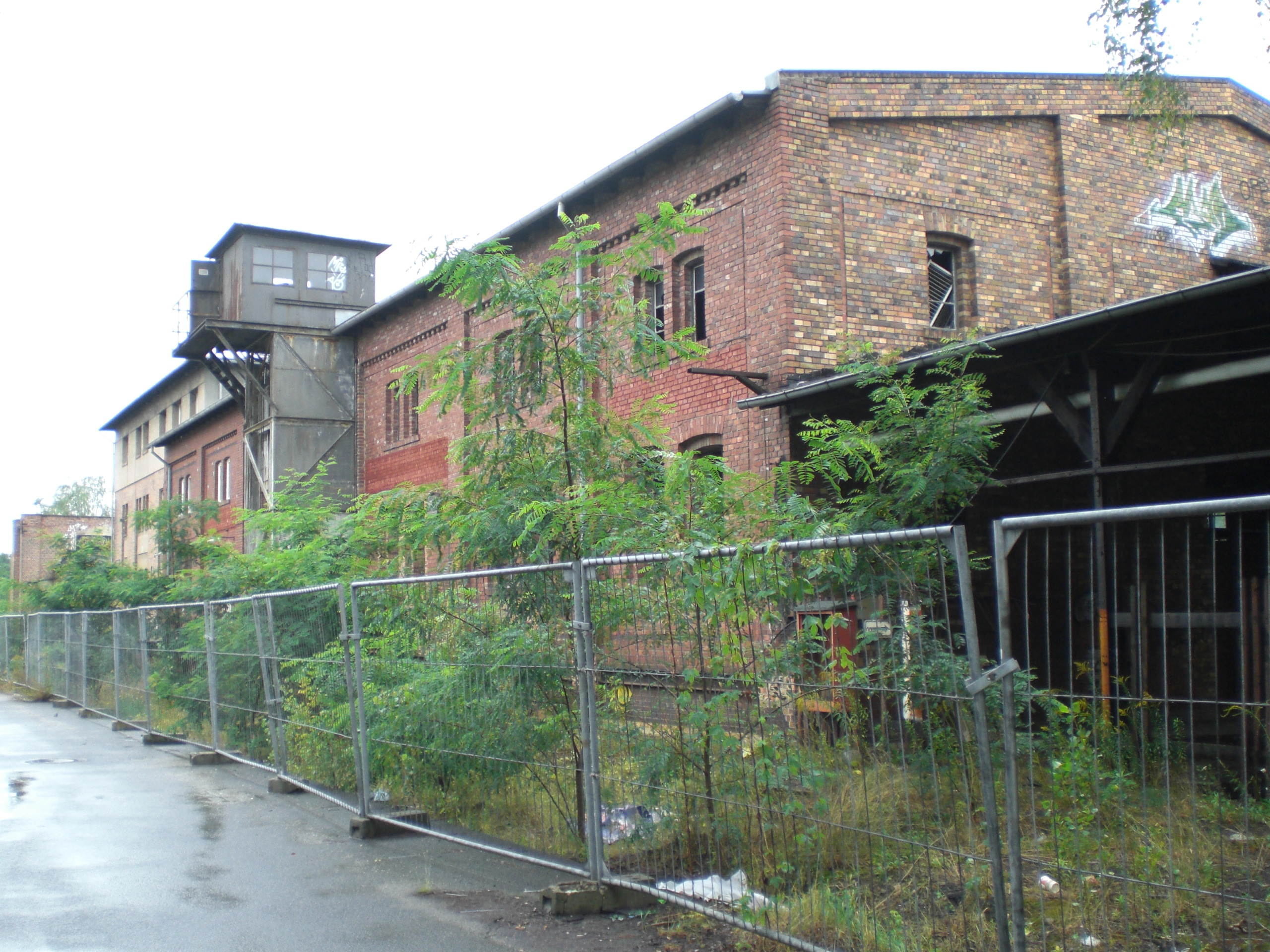

== Sources ==
- Dirk Winkler: Lokomotiv-Versuchsamt Grunewald, GeraMond, ISBN 3-7654-7131-3

== See also ==
- History of rail transport in Germany
- Deutsche Reichsbahn
