= Frankfurt City Link Line =

Railway line in Germany

Frankfurt am Main City Junction Line

Overview
- Native name: Städtische Verbindungsbahn Frankfurt am Main
- Locale: Hesse, Germany

Technical
- Line length: 7.7 km (4.8 mi)
- Track gauge: 1,435 mm (4 ft 8 1/2 in) standard gauge

The Frankfurt City Link Line (German: Städtische Verbindungsbahn, commonly just called the Verbindungsbahn) in Frankfurt am Main, Germany, emerged in the 19th century as a link line between Frankfurt's western stations at the Gallustor and the Frankfurt-Hanau railway in the east of the city. It was an initiative by the government of the Free City of Frankfurt.

On 31 July 1859, services opened on the 6 km long route that, for the most part, followed the northern bank of the river Main. It was initially operated by the Frankfurt-Hanau Railway Company and, from 1872, the Hessian Ludwig Railway Company (Hessische-Ludwigs-Eisenbahngesellschaft). Since the annexation of the free city into the Kingdom of Prussia in 1866 the line has remained in the ownership of the city authorities.

To begin with only freight services ran between the stations within the city to the customs house and the harbour. From 1 June 1869 passenger services were also operated, including express trains from Frankfurt's western stations to central Germany. This traffic ended when in 1873 the state-operated Frankfurt–Bebra railway picked up these services on the left bank of the Main.

In 1880 the line was extended by 1.7 km to the west. At that time the Hessian Ludwig Railway ran trains from Frankfurt East station to Limburg along the river Main, where a halt had been built at Fahrtor. Passenger services were withdrawn on 1 April 1913, when the Frankfurt-Hanau railway was linked to Frankfurt South station from the East station via the Deutschherrnbrücke bridge.

Since then, the line has been operated as the Frankfurt Harbour Railway (Städtische Hafenbahn). Its importance for the newly developed harbour facilities, industrial estates on the Hanau state highway and Frankfurt's wholesale market, the Grossmarkthalle grew continuously in the period after the Second World War.

When all the bridges over the Main were destroyed in 1945 after the end of the war, the line gained increased importance for transit traffic, because it was the only line for goods services from Frankfurt to the east. Even a modest amount of passenger traffic flourished: the Frankfurt-Königstein branch line ran its trains over the line from 13 July to 30 September 1945 from the Taunus via Frankfurt-Höchst station and Fahrtor to Frankfurt-Mainkur station.

Today there are daily transfers of goods to the Harbour Railway and occasional passenger train specials run by the Historic Railway, Frankfurt (HEF) with steam and diesel locomotives as well as railcars.

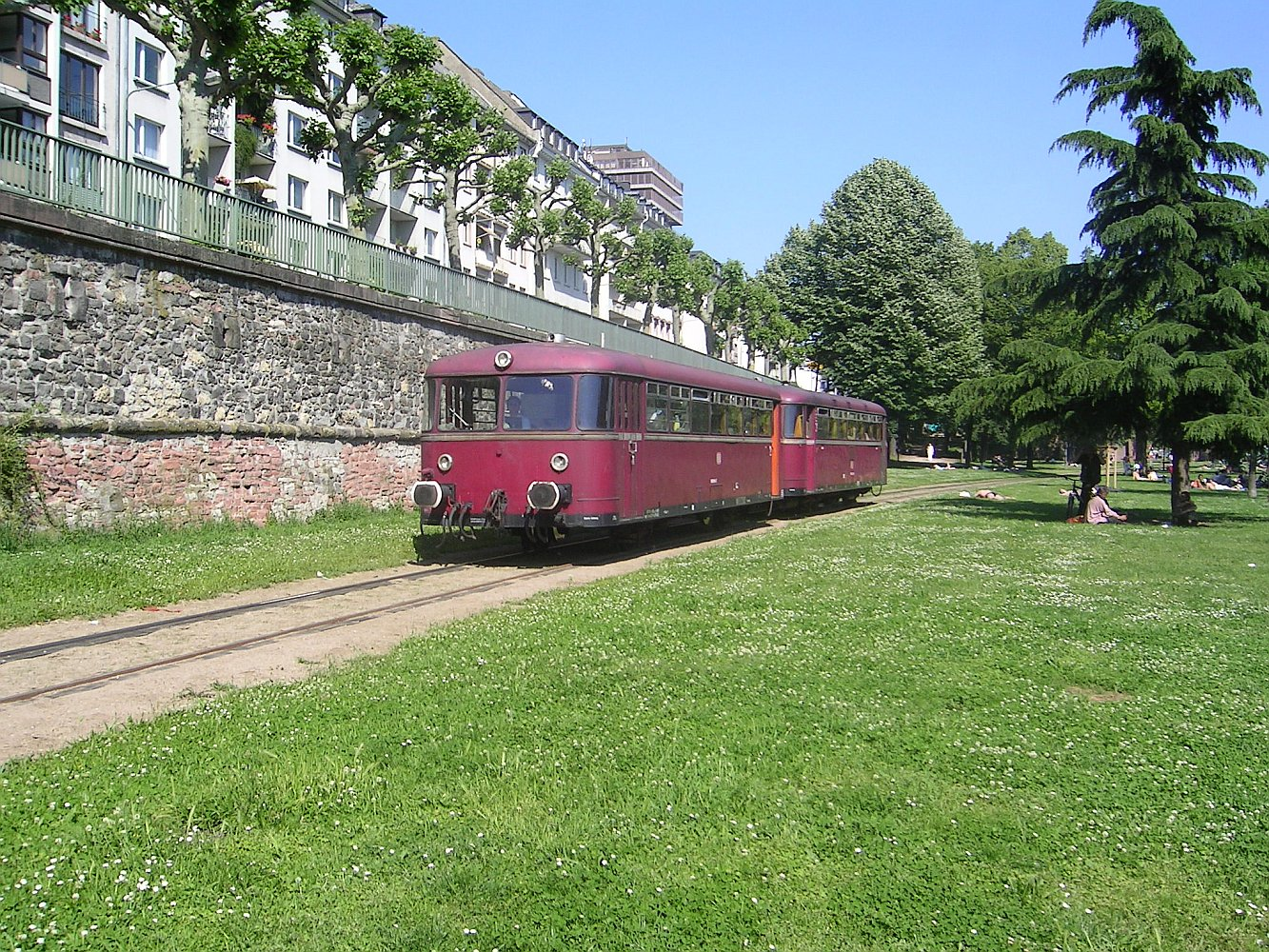
Railbus on the junction line along the river Main

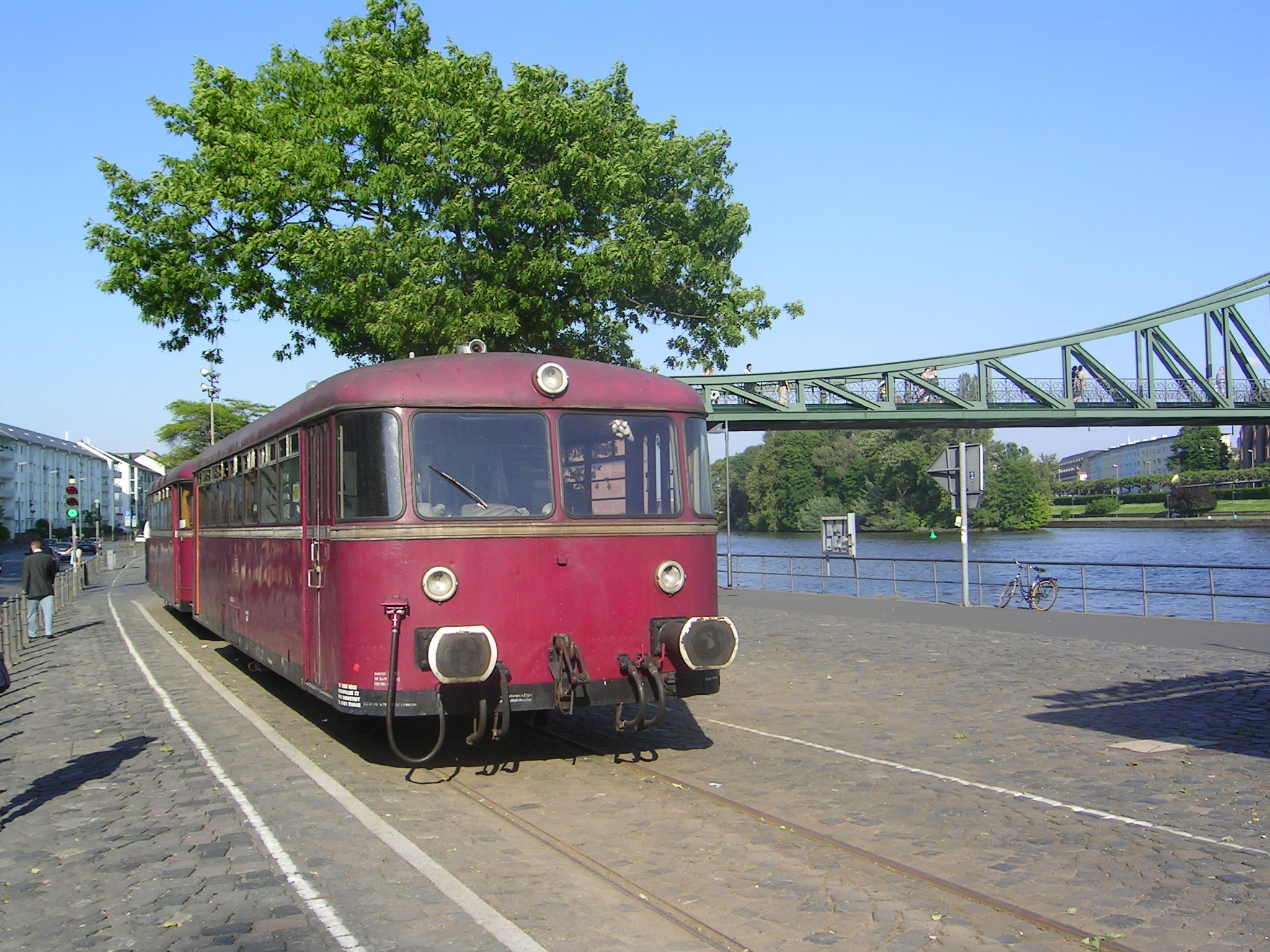
Railcar set on the junction line

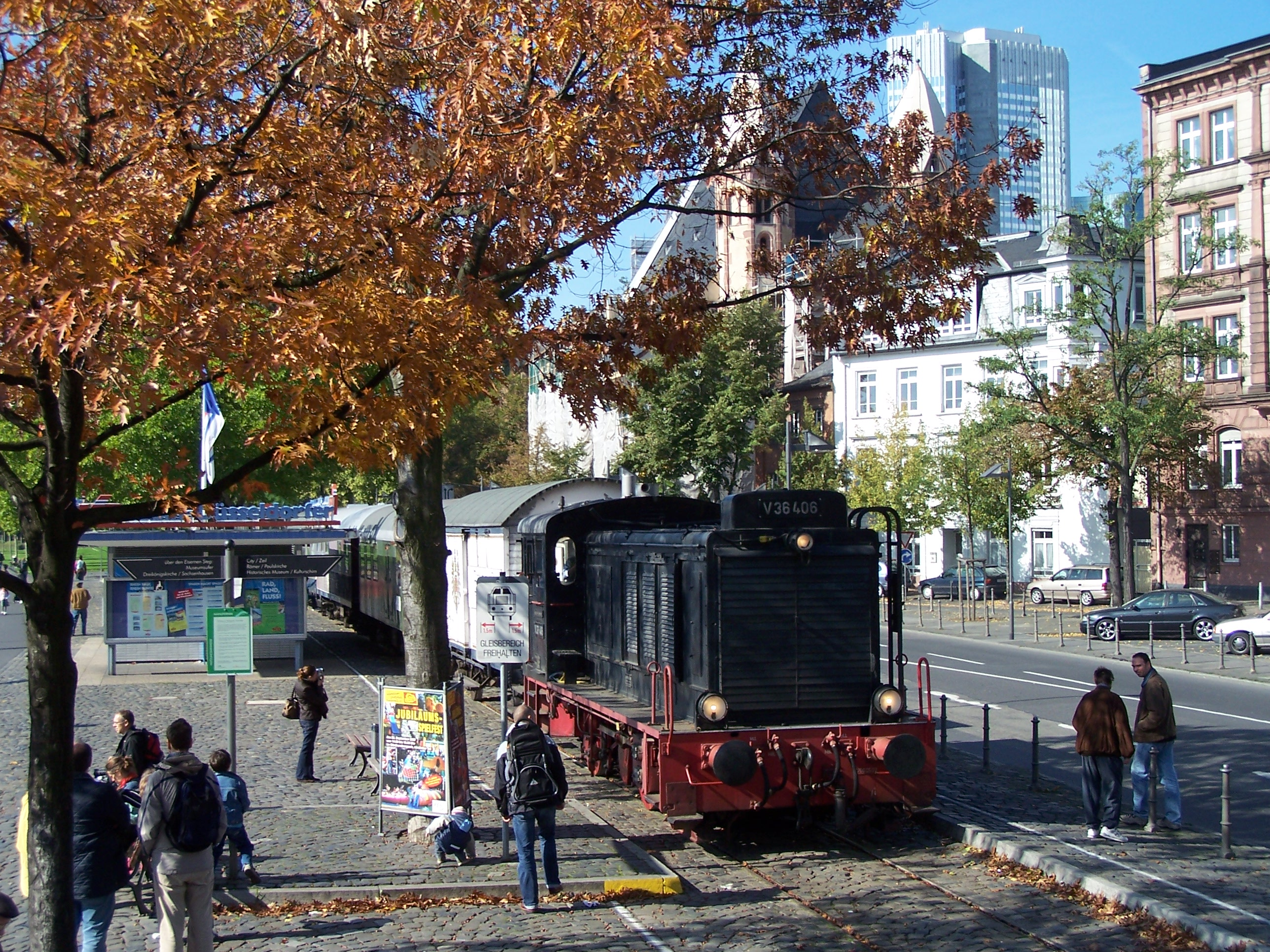
Number V36 406 of the HEF on the junction line at Eiserner Steg

== See also ==
- History of rail transport in Germany
