= Richard Paul Wagner =

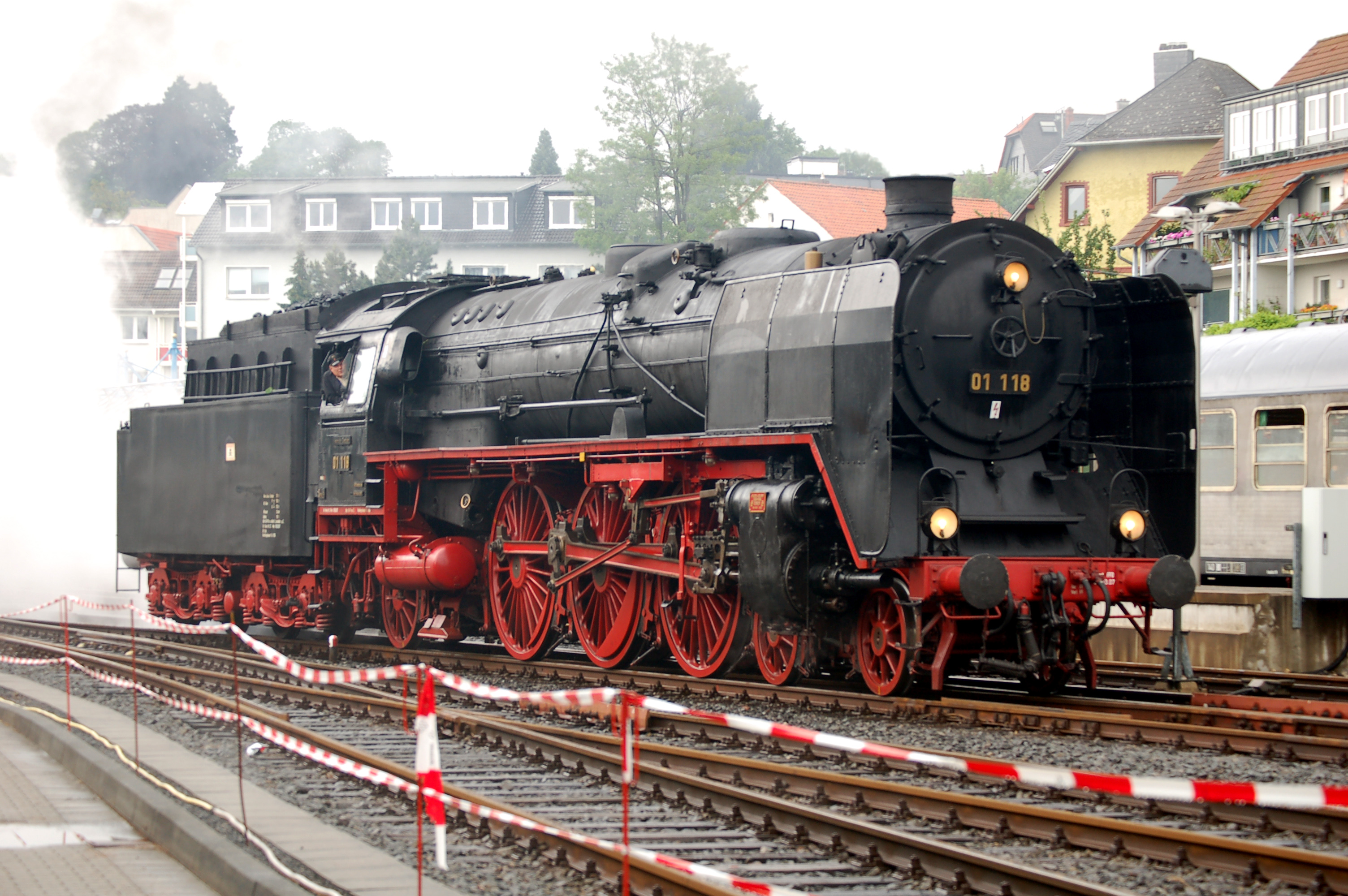
A DRG Class 01 locomotive fitted with the large, distinctive Wagner smoke deflectors either side of the smokebox

Richard Felix Paul Wagner (25 August 1882 – 14 February 1953) was the Chief of Design in the design office of the Deutsche Reichsbahn in Germany from its inception in 1922 to 1942. He held the rank of Reichsbahnoberrat. Richard Wagner was born in Berlin on 25 August 1882 and studied at the Charlottenburg Technical High School there from 1901 to 1906.

== Career ==
In 1920 he took over as head of the Berlin-Grunewald Locomotive Testing Office. In 1922 he was on the Enger Committee for the Standardisation of Locomotives and was employed by the Reichsbahn Central Office. In 1923 he took over the locomotive section within the Central Office.

=== Standard locomotives ===
With the development of standard steam locomotives (the so-called Einheitsdampflokomotiven) for the Deutsche Reichsbahn he was able to carry through his proposals for rationalising the construction and operation of steam locomotives. These were: to have the fewest possible locomotive classes, to avoid sub-classes and special classes, to have as many interchangeable parts as possible between different classes, even after undergoing repairs, and to produce components to a high degree of precision. As a result, in his time, a programme of locomotive classes was set up in the Standardisation Office of the Reichsbahn and with the manufacturers. On 1 June 1942 he retired, his successor being Friedrich Witte.

Wagner was influenced by his experiences with railway regiments in the First World War (locomotives frequently being out of service, problems with the procurement of spare parts, the maintenance of a large number of different classes of state railway (Länderbahn) locomotives, the lack of standardisation of components, and the need for simple and maintenance-friendly designs) and that led him to press for, sometimes very successful, but also at times rather stifling ideas about the concept of the Einheitslokomotiven. For example, Wagner was vehemently against fuel-saving high-performance boilers and four-cylinder compound engines, that had been very successful in the German state railways (e.g. the Bavarian S 3/6) or in other countries (e.g. the French designs of Chapelon), albeit more costly to maintain.

The programme of locomotive classes for the standard steam engines that Wagner helped to create could initially only be instigated on a small scale by the Reichsbahn, both for economic reasons and due to delays in upgrading railway routes to take the higher axle load of 20 tonnes. In many cases, just one or two trial locomotives of a given class were built or only small or pre-production runs delivered. Not until the onset of the German Reich's preparations for war were the 2-10-0 goods train locomotives from the standardisation programme, and the wartime locomotive (Kriegslokomotiven) derived from it, built in large quantities.

=== Other innovations ===
Today the name Wagner is particularly well known in railway circles for the standard smoke deflectors on Reichsbahn steam locomotives which bear his name; but this locomotive feature represents only a small part of his overall influence.

== Honours ==
In 1931 he was given an honorary doctorate by the Technical University of Aachen for his services in the structural development of the steam and oil engines and in 1936, the gold medal of service from the Society of British Locomotive Engineers. In 1942 he was awarded the War Merit Cross.

== Death ==
He died on 14 February 1953 at Velburg in the Upper Palatinate region of Bavaria, Germany.
